= Len Coulter =

Ottawa Alderman
- In office January 1, 1940 – December 31, 1948 Serving with David McMillan
- Preceded by: George Sloan
- Succeeded by: Victor Irish
- Constituency: Riverdale Ward

Ottawa Controller
- In office January 1, 1949 – December 31, 1952 Serving with Daniel McCann, Paul Tardif, C. E. Pickering (1949–1950); Charlotte Whitton (1951); John Powers (1951–1952)
- Preceded by: George Mackinley Geldert, Finley McRae, Grenville Goodwin, E. A. Bourque
- Succeeded by: Roy Donaldson

Acting (Deputy) Mayor of Ottawa
- In office January 3, 1949 – December 31, 1950
- Preceded by: G. M. Geldert
- Succeeded by: Charlotte Whitton
- In office October 15, 1951 – December 31, 1952
- Preceded by: Charlotte Whitton
- Succeeded by: Daniel McCann

Personal details
- Born: March 3, 1900 Almonte, Ontario, Canada
- Died: January 17, 1989 (aged 88) Ottawa, Ontario, Canada
- Party: Ontario Liberal Party; Liberal Party of Canada
- Spouse: Doris Frances Story (m. 1929)
- Children: 3

Leonard Lewis Coulter (March 3, 1900 – January 17, 1989) was a Canadian politician and pharmacist. He served as an alderman on Ottawa City Council from 1940 to 1948 and on the Ottawa Board of Control from 1949 to 1952, including terms as Acting (Deputy) Mayor of the city from 1949 to 1950 and from 1951 to 1952. He ran for mayor of Ottawa in 1952, losing in a close race to Charlotte Whitton.

== Early life ==
Coulter was born in Almonte, Ontario in 1900, the son of James Lewis Coulter, the manager of the Rosamond Woollen Mills in Almonte, who died when he was six, and Almyra Brown. His father was an immigrant from County Donegal, Ireland, and his mother was of United Empire Loyalist descent. As an adolescent in Almonte, he worked for the Ottawa Journal as a distributor.

He moved to Ottawa in around 1917, and attended Lisgar Collegiate Institute for high school, and apprenticed as a druggist. He attended the Ontario College of Pharmacy and the University of Toronto, receiving a Bachelor of Pharmacy in 1922. While he was in his mid-20s, he opened his first pharmacy, "Coulter's Drug Store" at 1090 Bank Street at the corner of Sunnyside Avenue in Old Ottawa South, just prior to the Great Depression. He would later say that he "built [his] business on credit he never collected", as during the depression many of his customers couldn't pay for drugs, but those customers' children became his "most loyal customers". Later in his career, he expanded his business with stores at 781 and 289 Bank Street. He later started Coulter Drug Stores Ltd.

== Alderman ==
Coulter was first elected to Ottawa City Council in the 1939 municipal election in Riverdale Ward. On election day, he won 1,505 votes in the two-seat ward, just 63 votes behind the poll topper, David McMillan, and nearly 250 votes ahead of incumbent George Sloan. Following his election, he was named to the Industrial and Publicity committee, the Tree committee, and the Street Railway committee.

Coulter ran for re-election in 1940, and topped the poll in Riverdale Ward, winning 1,978 votes, over 300 more than seat-mate McMillan. In the election, he advocated for the implementation of the Brittain report, particularly the recommendations affecting the civic service. Beginning the 1941 term, Coulter was appointed to the Industrial subcommittee for the Industrial and Publicity committee.

Coulter and seat-mate McMillan were re-elected by acclamation in Riverdale the next municipal election, held in 1942. On July 1, 1943, he announced he would seek the Ontario Liberal Party nomination for Ottawa South for the 1943 Ontario general election. At the nomination meeting, he defeated S. Leonard Belaire to be the party's official candidate. In the election, Coulter ran on an "Ottawa First" platform, suggesting at the "[a]ny provincial government that wouldn't co-operate with the Federal government in war-time would be traitorous", and that the Tory plan "would bankrupt the province in three years". On election day, he was defeated by Progressive Conservative candidate George H. Dunbar by about 2,500 votes. Of the riding's six wards it covered, Coulter was only able to win Dalhousie Ward, and lost his home ward of Riverdale by nearly 400 votes. For the 1944 term on city council, he was reappointed to the Industrial and Publicity, Tree and Street Railway committees.

On October 25, 1944, Coulter announced he was seeking re-election in the 1944 municipal election in Riverdale Ward. During the campaign, he told voters that the proposed new incinerator for the city would not be built in the ward, and ran on his efforts of getting a new park in the ward, and his motion to give preference for returned service men to enter civic service. On election day, Coulter topped the poll in the ward, winning 2,259 votes, over 600 votes ahead of seat-mate McMillan. Following the election, he was retained on the Industrial and Publicity, Tree and Street Railway committees. In 1946, Coulter was chosen to be the chair of the Ottawa Industrial and Publicity Bureau. He was also retained on the Industrial and Publicity and Street Railway committees, and was added to the Town Planning Commission.

Coulter and McMillan ran unopposed in the 1946 municipal election, and were thus re-elected to city council in Riverdale. Following the election, he was re-elected as chairman of the industrial and tourist committee. He also sat on the Tree, Street Railway and Sanitation and Waste Disposal Committees. He resigned from the Tree committee for 1948, but stayed in the Industrial and Publicity Committee, Street Railway and Sanitation and Waste committees.

== Board of Control ==
In 1948, Coulter debated between running for mayor of Ottawa, or for a seat on the city's Board of Control in the 1948 election. On October 4, he made his decision to run for the board. During the campaign, Coulter came out as fully in favour of the National Capital Plan, saying "[w]e can't bring industry here without annexing or taking in some additional territory". He stated that he wanted to be re-elected to council as he wanted "to be able to go before the government... and press for a larger grant than the present $300,000 for services rendered by the city". On election day, Coulter won 23,330 votes, more than any other candidate, and getting elected to the board. He topped the poll in Elmdale, Central, Capital, Riverdale, and Rideau Wards. Following the election, he was appointed to the board of directors of the Central Canada Exhibition Association, to the National Capital Planning Committee, and to the Civic Superannuation Administration. As a controller, he was assigned the finance portfolio. He was also named "Acting Mayor" (essentially, the Deputy Mayor) when council passed a resolution naming whichever controller won the most votes in the previous election to the position. Following the annexations of parts of Nepean Township and Gloucester, Coulter, in his role as Controller of Finance, presented the city's highest budget in the history of the city up to that point.

Coulter ran for re-election to the Board of Control in the 1950 municipal election. He ran for re-election in an attempt to "appeal to the voters on his record of 'service and integrity'", highlighting his work with the Capital Area Planning Board. During the campaign, he "looked favourably" on the idea of a five or 10 per cent tax on "occasional bingos" to help pay for indigent patients at hospitals, Children's Aid and other causes. He also defended the board having to conduct some of its meeting behind closed doors, as they had to do with private matters involving staff. He supported reducing the size of council (which had expanded significantly due to recent annexations). He defended the city's recent annexations stating the problems "would adjust themselves and (in) a few years, everybody would be happy". He stated that the city's debenture indebtedness was reduced over the previous term, and he preached a fiscally conservative approach to more modern services, suggesting they only be acquired if they could be paid for. In terms of accomplishments by the board over the previous term, he cited "securing an increased grant from the federal government in lieu of taxes on government buildings". He believed this would increase over the following year. He also cited "substantial gains ... made in the purchases of the OER assets for the OTC. On election day, he was re-elected to the city's four-seat Board of Control, finishing in second place, with 31,071 votes, over 7,000 behind the first place finisher Charlotte Whitton. Following the election, he was elected as president of the Ottawa Shrine Club. He was also made first vice-president of the Central Canada Exhibition Association, and named as the board's representative to the new committee which was set up to administer the Darling report on civic wage scales.

Following the death of Mayor Grenville Goodwin in 1951, there was speculation that council would elect Coulter as the city's full-time mayor for the remainder of the 1951–52 term. However, he eventually announced he would not seek the city's top job, and backed interim-mayor Charlotte Whitton instead. On October 15, Coulter was re-appointed as the city's Acting (Deputy) mayor, with Whitton's elevation to the mayoralty. In January 1952, Coulter was selected to be the president of the Central Canada Exhibition Association. That year, he also served as the chairman of the Ottawa Planning Area Board and the Civic Personnel and Superannuation Boards.

== 1952 mayoral campaign ==
On October 29, 1952, Coulter officially announced his candidacy for Mayor of Ottawa for the 1952 election, running against Whitton. Upon his declaration, he stated "I am responding to many requests from the public that I allow my name to be considered for this high office". Addressing the elephant in the room, that the election was between a man and a woman, he stated "I would like it to be very clear that I want no part of any 'man versus woman' issue. [It] should play no part in any election campaign," and that "[a] great proportion of my support is ... from the women of Ottawa". With the announcement a few days later that E. A. Bourque would not run for the city's top job, the race became a head to head battle between Whitton and Coulter. Bourque dropping out was thought to help Coulter, as it would unify the male vote. During the campaign, Coulter supported getting a larger share of the city's revenue from the federal government, stating the current "payment in lieu of taxes" was "totally inadequate". He supported more housing, did not want to "burden the tax-payers ... with debts", he supported improved parking in Centretown, bringing water and sewers to Hurdmans Bridge, and attracting tourists. He also opposed the Sunday sports issue which was put to Ottawa votes during the election as a plebiscite, but promised to be "governed" be the voters' wishes. He also wanted to attract industry to the city, getting rid of overhead wiring, and wanted to take a gradual approach to street and sidewalk repairs. On election day, Coulter received 33,498 votes, but lost to Whitton by just 3,875 votes. The election saw a then-record turnout of about 70 per cent. Coulter did especially well in the city's Francophone Lower Town neighbourhood, which was covered by Ward 2. The only other ward he won was Ward 3, which covered part of his old Riverdale Ward and Sandy Hill.

== Post-politics ==
Following his defeat, Coulter was appointed by council to serve on the Ottawa Hydro-Electric Commission, much to the chagrin of Whitton, who vowed to fight his appointment. He was succeeded as Central Canada Exhibition Association President by S. F. Dadson, and became a life director in the process. He continued to serve on the board of the CCEA until his death. Coulter considered another run for mayor in the 1954 mayoral election, but stated the "pressure of private business made it impossible for him" to run. In 1957, he was made the vice-chairman of the Ottawa Hydro-Electric Commission.

In 1958, he announced he was selling his drug store business to a group of his employees in a complicated arrangement that would take the next 15 years. In 1959, he was elected as the president of Ottawa Neighbourhood Services, the "only self-supporting welfare organization in Canada" for 1960. He was re-elected for 1961, 1962, 1963, 1964, 1965, 1966, 1967, and 1968. He retired as president in 1970.

In 1969, Coulter was appointed by city council to a new subsidiary planning board "to work in co-operation with new regional government planning authorities". In 1970, Coulter was named the new chairman of the Ottawa Hydro-Electric Commission, replacing former mayor J. E. Stanley Lewis. He served as chairman until he was "unceremoniously dropped" by the city's Board of Control in 1975.

He died in 1989 at the Riverside Hospital. He was interred at the Pinecrest Cemetery.

== Personal life ==
Outside of politics, Coulter owned three drug stores, and served several terms as a director of the United Drug Company of Toronto, the Ottawa United Drug Company, as a director of the Rexall Drug Company, and president of the Ontario Municipal Electrical Association, and on the Ottawa Board of Trade. Later in life, he became president of a real estate company in South March, Ontario. He was married and had three children. He enjoyed golf, hunting and fishing, baseball and lacrosse, and was a member of the Anglican Church. He had a summer home in Dunrobin, Ontario. In partisan politics, Coulter "handled all the physical arrangements" for the 1948 and 1958 Liberal Party of Canada leadership elections.
