= 1944 Ottawa municipal election =

The city of Ottawa, Canada held municipal elections on December 4, 1944.

== Mayor of Ottawa ==
Candidate	Votes	%
J. E. Stanley Lewis (X)	17,814	56.71
C. E. Pickering	7,602	24.20
V. Cyril Phelan	5,997	19.10

== Referendums ==
(Only property owners could vote in the referendums)

$2,000,000 for Post-War projects
Option	Votes	%
For	5,404	61.15
Against	3,434	38.85

$500,000 for Slum clearance
Option	Votes	%
For	5,059	57.40
Against	3,754	42.60

== Ottawa Board of Control ==
(4 elected)

Candidate	Votes	%
Grenville Goodwin (X)	18,062	
G. M. Geldert (X)	17,757	
Finley McRae (X)	16,739	
E. A. Bourque (X)	14,746	
S. Leonard Belaire	11,266	
Sydney T. Checkland	3,802	
Percy Bedford	2,805	

== Ottawa City Council ==
(2 elected from each ward)

Rideau Ward
Candidate	Votes	%
Leslie Avery (X)	Acclaimed	
John Powers (X)	Acclaimed	

By Ward
Candidate	Votes	%
Eric Query (X)	1,186	
Jules Morin	733	
Paul E. Tasse	528	
J. M. Laframboise (X)	438	
Edgar Lachine	361	

St. George's Ward
Candidate	Votes	%
Arthur Pinard (X)	1,612	
Roy Donaldson	1,504	
James W. Jefferson	1,294	
P. Ambrose Nolan	628	

Wellington Ward
Candidate	Votes	%
Martin M. Walsh	1,866	
Charles Parker (X)	1,759	
Sam Chandler (X)	1,357	
Christie A. McDonald	1,016	

Capital Ward
Candidate	Votes	%
Edward Band (X)	2,594	
Joseph McCulloch (X)	2,431	
Joseph A. Enstone	940	

Dalhousie Ward
Candidate	Votes	%
Daniel McCann (X)	2,190	
Wilbert Hamilton (X)	1,577	
James McAuley	848	
James R. Sands	356	

Elmdale Ward
Candidate	Votes	%
Henry Bradley (X)	2,236	
George Pingle (X)	2,164	
Grant McCready	936	
Ray Lefebvre	730	

Victoria Ward
Candidate	Votes	%
Paul Tardif (X)	1,474	
Frank Ellis	629	
Joseph Allard	604	
Charles Boone	459	
Lucien Prudhomme	348	
Harvey Lacasse	172	
Edward J. Lachance	127	
Ernest Arbour	68	

Ottawa Ward
Candidate	Votes	%
Napoleon Bordeleau (X)	1,475	
Aristide Belanger (X)	1,353	
Henri Rheaume	1,267	

Riverdale Ward
Candidate	Votes	%
Len Coulter (X)	2,259	
David McMillan (X)	1,642	
George S. Sloan	1,127	

Central Ward
Candidate	Votes	%
J. Grant Shaw (X)	1,699	
Fred Journeaux (X)	1,654	
Joseph C. Thomas	929	
Elmore A. Davis	657	
James J. Enright	625	
