= Wilbert Hamilton =

Canadian politician (1897–1964)

Ottawa Alderman
- In office January 1, 1932 – December 31, 1933 Serving with E. P. McGrath
- Preceded by: Daniel McCann
- Succeeded by: Daniel McCann, James J. McVeigh
- Constituency: Dalhousie Ward
- In office January 1, 1935 – December 31, 1956 Serving with Daniel McCann (until 1948); James McAuley (after 1948)
- Preceded by: James J. McVeigh
- Succeeded by: Charles Parker
- Constituency: Dalhousie Ward (Ward 6 from 1953–1956)

Ottawa Controller
- In office January 1, 1957 – November 2, 1962 Serving with Paul Tardif, Ernie Jones (until 1960), Sam Berger (until 1960); Don B. Reid (from 1960); Lloyd Francis (from 1960)
- Preceded by: George Nelms, Roy Donaldson
- Succeeded by: Ellen Webber, Ernie Jones (1963)

Personal details
- Born: Nov 17, 1897 South March, Ontario
- Died: June 9, 1964 Ottawa
- Spouse(s): Olive Patterson (m. 1921; died 1940); Marjorie Giddings (m. 1945)
- Children: 7

C. Wilbert Hamilton (November 17, 1897 – June 9, 1964) was a Canadian politician. He was an alderman on Ottawa City Council from 1932 to 1933 and from 1935 to 1956, and a member of the Ottawa Board of Control from 1957 to 1962. His tenure in civic politics set a record for longest continual years of service.

== Early life ==
Hamilton was born in South March, Ontario, the son of immigrants William John Hamilton from Ireland and Mary Gordon of Scotland. His father was a farmer in Carp, Ontario. The family moved to Dalhousie Ward in 1909.

He went to high school at Lisgar Collegiate Institute and attended Teacher's College, where he trained to be a printing technical teacher. Following his education, he worked as a compositor at the government printing bureau, where he would work for over 30 years, retiring as superintendent. One of his responsibilities was ensuring that Hansard was delivered to the Canadian Parliament every day while it was in session. He also oversaw several top secret documents during World War II.

He served in World War I with the 74th Battery, Canadian Field Artillery where he was a gunner.

Hamilton first considered running for Ottawa City Council in the 1930 Ottawa municipal election, but ultimately did not. The following year, he was successful in having a charge of illegally competing with the Ottawa Electric Railway (OER) withdrawn, as he was suspected of accepting remuneration from passengers in his automobile. During his political career, he supported the city taking over the OER, and supported the city's transition from streetcars to busses.

== Alderman ==
On November 2, 1931, Hamilton announced that he would run for city council in his home Dalhousie Ward in the 1931 Ottawa municipal election. He was elected along with E. P. McGrath, winning 1,575 votes for the two-seat position, 321 votes fewer than McGrath. He ran on a platform of lower taxes, re-organization of city hall, co-operation with the government to build a new city hall, submitting all large expenditures to taxpayers, city contracts to local firms, no further concessions to the Ottawa Electric Railway, the return of working-men's tickets, day labour and fair wage clause on all city works, and co-operation to relieve unemployment.

At the time, municipal elections were an annual occurrence. Hamilton ran again for re-election in the 1932 municipal election, after securing permission from his government department. Both Hamilton and his seat mate McGrath were re-elected, Hamilton with 1,692 votes, 250 votes behind McGrath. At this point, Hamilton was the youngest member of city council. On council, he was a member of the Civic Industrial and Publicity Committee, and was the chairman of the Mothers' Allowance Committee. Hamilton ran for re-election in the 1933 election, but went down to defeat for the only time in his career. Former controller Daniel McCann had entered the race, and topped the poll with 2,285 votes. McVeigh was re-elected with 1,315 votes, while Hamilton finished third with 1,268 votes. Following his defeat, he continued to chair the Mothers' Allowance Committee until October 1934. He also studied unemployment insurance, and promoted rehabilitating families on relief.

Hamilton sought election again in the 1934 election, and was elected back on to council, winning 1,579 votes, nearly 1,700 votes behind McCann, who again topped the poll. McVeigh was defeated, after having finished third, just 38 votes behind Hamilton, and was the only alderman who lost his seat in the election. During the 1935 term on council, Hamilton took an interest in work and relief and was the chairman of the special committee dealing with a civic works program. He became chairman of the Mothers' Allowances again, was a member of the special committee on classification of civic employees. Following speculation he may run for a seat on the city's Board of Control, Hamilton announced on November 6, 1935 that he would run in that year's municipal election. He was ultimately re-elected, winning 1,989 votes, 259 votes behind McCann who topped the poll again. McVeigh finished third, over 1000 votes behind Hamilton.

During the 1936 council, Hamilton was a member of the Industrial and Publicity Committee, and served on the Playgrounds Committee. He announced on November 21, 1936 that he would run again in the 1936 election. He was re-elected, winning 1,448 votes, 388 votes behind McCann.

Ending more speculation that he would run for Board of Control that year, Hamilton ran for re-election again in the 1937 election. One thing holding him back was the prohibition of civil servants running for the board. He was re-elected, winning 1,696 votes, 399 votes behind McCann. Hamilton ran for re-election again in the 1938 election. He was re-elected after finishing second again winning roughly 2,200 votes, about 500 behind McCann. During the 1939 term, Hamilton served as the chairman of the Ottawa Industrial and Publicity Committee. He was re-elected again in the 1939 election with McCann, this time without any opposition. Two candidates who were planning on running dropped out before the close of nominations.

During the 1940 term, Hamilton continued to chair the Industrial and Publicity Committee. Later in the year, he suffered through the death of his first wife, Olive. He remained in politics, and was re-elected in the 1940 election, winning 1,662 votes, 558 votes behind McCann.

Ottawans voted to lengthen council terms to two years in the 1939 election, meaning Hamilton's victory in 1940 would mean serving for both the 1941 and 1942 calendar years. Following the election, Hamilton continued his chairmanship of the Civic Industrial and Publicity Committee until asking to be removed as chair in August 1941. In the 1942 election, Hamilton was re-elected, winning 2,100 votes, again finishing second behind McCann by 550 votes. Two years later, he was re-elected again in the 1944 election, winning 1,577 votes, 613 votes behind McCann.

On November 1, 1946 he announced he would be running for re-election in 1946. He was re-elected once again, winning 1,193 votes, 552 votes behind McCann. In 1947, he and Mayor J. E. Stanley Lewis travelled to the Soviet Union to commemorate the 800th anniversary of the founding of Moscow.

In the 1948 election, Hamilton finally topped the poll in Dalhousie Ward, winning 2,261 votes. He was elected alongside James McAuley. His running mate, McCann, had run for a seat on the Board of Control. During the campaign, Hamilton supported annexing surrounding suburbs into the city. By the 1949–50 council term, Hamilton had become the senior Anglophone member of city council, having served for 18 years by the end of the term. He announced he would run for re-election on November 17, 1950. He was re-elected in the 1950 election, topping the poll in Dalhousie Ward with 2,651 votes. McAuley was re-elected as well.

In 1951, Hamilton was made chairman of the Smoke Abatement Committee, which was charged with cutting down smoke emissions in the city. When mayor Grenville Goodwin died in August 1951, there was some speculation that Hamilton would be appointed to the Board of Control to replace Charlotte Whitton, who became acting mayor.

Following the annexation of parts of Nepean Township and Gloucester Township, the city council had ballooned in size, prompting voters to back a plebiscite to reduce the size of city council for the 1952 municipal election. This caused a new ward map to be drawn, and Hamilton was drawn into the new Ward 6 (ward names were dropped for the next few elections). Hamilton was elected in the new ward with 4,770 votes, topping the poll. His Dalhousie seat mate McAuley was also re-elected. Alderman Charles Parker who had represented neighbouring Wellington Ward finished third. With his election, Hamilton became the dean of the council.

During the 1953–54 council, Hamilton served as chairman of the Tourist and Convention committee, was vice president of the Central Canada Exhibition Association (CCEA), and chairman of the printing committee. He considered running for mayor of Ottawa in the 1954 election, but dropped out in October, stating that the only way he could beat incumbent Charlotte Whitton was in a one on one race. However, Whitton already faced two credible opponents in David Luther Burgess, a prominent member of the Royal Canadian Legion and former mayor E. A. Bourque, so Hamilton stayed out. On November 15, 1954, he announced he would be running for re-election in Ward 6. In addition to possibly running for mayor, he had been rumoured to run for board of control, but declined, citing public servant regulations. On election day, Hamilton was re-elected, topping the poll in Ward 6, winning 4,021 votes, just 20 more than McAulay. Parker ran again, finishing third.

== Controller ==
On October 20, 1956, Hamilton announced he was going to run for the city's Board of Control, council's four member executive branch, in the 1956 election. When running for the Board, he was noted as an "advocate of public ownership of public utilities" due to his support for the establishment of the Ottawa Hydro Commission. Hamilton was successful in his election bid, winning 24,167 votes, placing third on the four seat Board, almost 6,000 votes behind the leading candidate, Paul Tardif. With his win, Hamilton would retain his vice presidency of the CCEA which he had held over the previous term.

Hamilton was named president of the CCEA on January 16, 1957, a position he held until January 1959. In the Fall of 1957, he retired from his job with the federal government's printing bureau. In his first term as controller, he was the spokesman for the Department of Planning and Works. On November 14, 1958, he announced that he would run for re-election to the Board for the 1958 election. On election day, he won 28,763 votes, good enough for fourth place, the last spot on the board. He was roughly 4,600 votes behind Tardif, who topped the poll once again. Also that year, Hamilton was rumoured to be in the consideration to become the Queen's Printer, a position which had become vacant.

Hamilton was re-elected to the Board of Control for a final time in the 1960 election, winning 38,611 votes, finishing in fourth again, over 9,000 votes behind the leader vote getter, Lloyd Francis.

== OTC Commissioner ==
Hamilton was appointed as a member of the Ottawa Transportation Commission on November 3, 1962, resigning from the Board of Control in the process. Thus ended a city record for continuous elected service. He replaced C.C. Gibson, who had been appointed as a County Court Judge.

== Death ==
Not even two years after his appointment to the OTC, Hamilton was rushed to the Ottawa Civic Hospital on June 7, 1964, where he would have a blood clot removed from his brain. He did not regain consciousness, and died on June 9.

== Personal life ==
Hamilton married his first wife, Olive Beatrice Patterson in 1921 at McLeod Street Methodist Church in Ottawa. She died in 1940. Five years after her death, Hamilton re-married in 1945 to Marjorie Valentine Giddings at First United Church. In total, he had seven children, five with Olive.

Hamilton was a founding member of the Ottawa Club of Printing House Craftsmen, and served as president in 1946. He was a member of the Montgomery Branch of the Royal Canadian Legion. He was a member of the Erskine Presbyterian Church, and the Doric Freemason Lodge, the International Typographical Union, was president of the Dalhousie Municipal Association, was on the executive of the Dalhousie Community Club, Wellington Home and School Club, and the Primrose Athletic Association. He also served as a director of the Gladstone Football Club and the Montagnard Club, was a member of the Civil Service Association of Ottawa, was director of the Eastern Ontario Development Association,a director of the Ottawa Winter Fair, and a member of the Knockers Club of Ottawa.
