= Daniel McCann (politician) =

Canadian politician

Ottawa Alderman
- In office January 1, 1930 – December 31, 1931 Serving with Clarence M. Denneny (1930); E. P. McGrath (1931)
- Preceded by: Jim Forward & Sam Crooks
- Succeeded by: Wilbert Hamilton
- Constituency: Dalhousie Ward
- In office January 1, 1934 – December 31, 1948 Serving with James J. McVeigh (1934); Wilbert Hamilton (1935–1948)
- Preceded by: Wilbert Hamilton & E. P. McGrath
- Succeeded by: James McAuley

Ottawa Controller
- In office January 1, 1932 – December 31, 1932 Serving with George Mackinley Geldert, Fulgence Charpentier & George Harrison Dunbar
- Preceded by: James Warren York & J. E. Stanley Lewis
- Succeeded by: J. E. Stanley Lewis
- In office January 1, 1949 – September 8, 1954 Serving with Len Coulter (1949–52), Paul Tardif (1949–54), C. E. Pickering (1949–50), Charlotte Whitton (1950–1951), John Powers (1951–54), Roy Donaldson (1953–54)
- Preceded by: George Mackinley Geldert, Finley McRae, Grenville Goodwin & E. A. Bourque
- Succeeded by: George Nelms, Ernie Jones

Deputy Mayor of Ottawa
- In office January 1, 1953 – September 8, 1954
- Preceded by: Len Coulter
- Succeeded by: Paul Tardif

Personal details
- Born: January 9, 1887 Ottawa, Ontario, Canada
- Died: September 8, 1954 Ottawa, Ontario, Canada
- Party: Independent Labor Party; Liberal Party of Canada
- Spouse: Hannah Brennan (m. 1912)
- Children: 4

Daniel E. McCann (January 9, 1887 – September 8, 1954) was a Canadian politician. He served as Deputy Mayor of Ottawa from 1953 until his death in 1954, was a member of the Ottawa Board of Control in 1932 and from 1949 to 1954, and served on Ottawa City Council as an alderman from 1930 to 1931 and from 1934 to 1948. He was known for his "powerful voice that could easily cut through crowd noises and demand attention". On the Board of Control, he was mayor Charlotte Whitton's "most consistent" supporter.

== Early life ==
McCann was born in 1887, on Vittoria Street in a house near where the Confederation Building and the Justice Building now exists. His parents were Daniel McCann and Ellen Scott, who immigrated from Belfast, Ireland, in 1883. He was educated at Kent Street School.

While just a teenager, he became involved with the labour movement, becoming a member of the International Printing Pressmen's organization. He moved to the city's Dalhousie Ward in around 1911. He joined the government's Printing Bureau in 1910, serving there until 1919, and from 1923.

In 1919, McCann, as a member of the Teamsters' Union and controller Frank H. Plant reached an agreement with Ottawa Electric Railway strikers to ensure a maximum wage of 50 cents per hour.

McCann first ran for office in the 1922 municipal election, running for city council in Dalhousie Ward, getting the support from the ward's Liberal machine. On election day, he won 545 votes, finishing fourth place.

== Career ==
=== Alderman (1930–1931) ===
On October 1, 1929, he officially announced he was running again for Alderman in Dalhousie Ward in the 1929 municipal elections. At the time he was working in the Department of Public Printing and Stationary, as a pressman, and was the president of the Ottawa Pressman Association and the Allied Printing Trades Council. Both of the ward's aldermen decided to run in the new Elmdale Ward, which had been carved out of Dalhousie, opening the seat up for competition. McCann campaigned on removing the city's cross-town tracks, supporting city council's approval of $350,000 to do so, and also supported putting municipal employees on the city's payroll if they worked for the city for five years. During the election, McCann claimed not to be running as a "labour candidate", but did receive the endorsements of several labour organizations, and had stated his part in getting city employees a $0.50/hour wage, eight hour work days. In the election, McCann was elected to the ward's second seat, winning 1,176 votes.

During his first term of office, he helped organize the West End Intermediate Softball League, and had set aside Plouffe Park as a lacrosse field for city-wide games, as a proponent of re-popularizing the game. He also claimed that the use of day labour on the King Edward sewer, fair wage clause for city work, and better conditions for older city employees were thanks to his efforts. In his first term, he sat on the city's Industrial and Publicity committee, thanks to his experience in printing, and worked on the city's carnival. He also sat on the city's Playground Committee, and was involved in recommending changes to the Plant Bath. After being asked to run for the city's Board of Control, McCann decided to run for re-election in Dalhousie Ward in the 1930 election, on a platform of better street lighting. On election day, McCann topped the poll in the ward, winning 1,993 votes.

During his second term in office, he supported measures to give more employment to residents of the city, and getting improvements to his ward. He played a role in bringing police protection near schools and was credited with organizing the "card system" for identifying all applicants for work. He continued his membership on the Playgrounds committee and the Industrial and Publicity Committee, and was on the Old Age Pension Board.

=== Board of Control (1932) ===
On November 6, 1931, McCann announced he was going to run of a seat on the city's Board of Control in the 1931 municipal election. He gave the idea consideration after 400 people in his department and "hundreds of friends" urged him to do so. McCann ran against the "high tax rate" and against any capital expenditure through debentures without the consent of voters. He also opposed any concessions to the Ottawa Electric Railway Company and against the building of a new city hall on any new site, unless the government bought the site from the city. On election day, he was elected to the four-seat board, finishing in second with 12,026 votes. He won support throughout the city, but did especially well in wards with large numbers of civil servants, as opposed to labour, despite his involvement with organized labour.

In addition to being elected to the city's Board of Control in December 1931, McCann was promoted to the audit and estimating branch at the Department of Public Printing and Stationary. However, as he had been elected to the Board of Control, he was forced to take a leave of absence for the year so he could run for re-election in the 1932 municipal election. In the 1932 election, he ran on a platform in opposition to metering water in homes, opposing higher fares for the Ottawa Electric Railway, opposing one man cars for the OER, and wanted a plebiscite for any agreement with the railway. He also supported relief grocery orders being honoured by all grocery stores, something he suggested was causing grocers to oppose his candidacy. On election day, McCann lost his seat, finishing fifth, despite winning more votes than he did in 1931. He won 12,107 votes, just over 900 votes behind the fourth place finisher, J. E. Stanley Lewis. Due to his defeat, he was able to return to work at the Government Printing Bureau, and did not have to take a year's leave of absence.

=== Return to Alderman (1934–1948) ===
For the 1933 municipal election, McCann chose to run for his old aldermanic job in Dalhousie. On election day, he topped the poll, winning 2,285 votes, and claiming the most votes ever for a candidate in the ward. In his first term back on council, he went back to the industrial and publicity committee, and joined the parks and trees committee. On council, he advocated for a storm sewer program in his ward, and getting care for those on relief, in addition to his previous work for making day labour work available for the unemployed.

McCann ran for re-election in 1934, and topped the poll in Dalhousie, winning 2,263 votes. On the 1935 council, McCann was unanimously elected as chairman of the Civic Parks and Trees Committee. He was also a member of the civic milk committee, and claimed responsibility for street improvements in his ward such as the paving of Albert Street, Somerset Street and Gladstone Avenue.

McCann was re-elected once again to council in the 1935 elections, winning 2,248 votes, placing first in Dalhousie Ward for a second time in a row. Following his election, he was re-elected as chairman of the Civic Parks and Tree Committee.

McCann was re-elected in the 1936 elections, winning 1,836 votes, topping the poll in Dalhousie again. Following his election, he was re-elected chair of the civic parks and trees committee to serve his third term in that capacity. On council, he moved that a survey be made of street lighting, and put a motion through council recommending that the provincial government extend the time limit for the securing of automobile licences.

McCann was re-elected for another term in the 1937 elections, placing first in Dalhousie Ward with 2,095 votes. Following his election, he was re-appointed chairman of the Civic Parks and Trees Committee, and was made vice-chairman of the civic playgrounds committee.

McCann was re-elected again in the 1938 elections, topping the poll in Dalhousie Ward again, winning over 2,700 votes. Following the election, he was made chairman of the Civic Playgrounds Committee.

McCann, and his seat mate Wilbert Hamilton were both re-elected without opposition in the 1939 elections. Following the election, he was re-elected for a second term as chairman of the Civic Playgrounds Committee. During the 1940 term, he claimed "more people were getting jobs, and the relief roll had been pared", and stated he was "responsible for cleaner streets" in his ward, and did not vote for any tax increases. He promised that taxes would be lowered in 1941, and created a motion on city council to urge the federal government to adopt a policy of "gradual demobilization" following World War II, so that "discharged men would be absorbed back into employment and not go on relief".

McCann topped the poll in Dalhousie Ward once again in the 1940 elections, winning 2,220 votes, beginning his first two year term, with city council doubling its term lengths. One of his highlights from the 1941–42 term was helping to obtain more wages for the city's garbagemen.

After his first two year term, he was re-elected in the 1942 elections, placing first in Dalhousie Ward with 2,650 votes. Over the next term of office, McCann suffered the death of his mother in 1943, and both his brother and son in 1944. Despite this, he ran for re-election in 1944, topping the poll in Dalhousie Ward with 2,190 votes.

In 1945, McCann was named chairman of the Civic Playgrounds Committee once again, after a break of a few years. During the 1945–46 term, he claimed to be instrumental in "reducing the cost of sidewalk building and oiling the streets". He objected to permits being given for non-essential building such as theatres and bowling alleys, given how many people were without homes.

McCann was re-elected in the 1946 municipal election, finishing first in Dalhousie with 1,745 votes. Following his election, he was re-appointed as chairman of the Playgrounds Committee, and was a member of the Parks Committee.

=== Return to the Board of Control (1949–1954) ===
McCann chose to run for a seat on the city's Board of Control once again in the 1948 municipal election, believing that the position "demanded a man's full time", as he promised to devote his full time to the job. He believed the city's decision to tear down the old city hall was a mistake, and the city should have used the insurance money to repair the building. He also supported annexation expansion of the city's boundaries through the National Capital Plan, and that it would be paid by the federal government, and promised that taxpayers wouldn't pay more than their fair share. He also promised that he would try and keep taxes at their present level if possible, and supported providing "adequate playgrounds" to reduce juvenile delinquency. On election day, McCann was elected, finishing second on the four seat board with 21,267 votes. McCann's vote total, and poll-topper Len Coulter won the most votes ever for a board of control candidate up to then. True to his promise, upon his election, McCann retired from his public servant job. Upon becoming a controller, McCann was made responsible for the city's Works Department. In 1949, McCann was named vice-chairman of the Ottawa Recreation Commission. He was named chair the following year, and held the chairmanship until 1951. Also in 1950, he was named chair of a new committee to study potential new city hall sites. During this term on the Board of Control, McCann claimed that the board "had dealt with many of the greatest issues ever to confront any board", such as grants from the government, a new housing scheme, and taxes being "kept within bounds".

McCann ran for re-election to the Board of Control in 1950, running on his "record of service", such as his "efficient administration of the Works department" and the fact that he would dedicate his full time to voters. He also suggested the provincial government "carry education costs", and believed that taxes had increased due to hospital and school expenses which should be picked up by other levels of government, and that plans were being created to move indigent patients from the Civic Hospital. He also believed that the Ottawa Transportation Commission should not charge extra fares for the newly annexed parts of the city, and that "every effort be made to adjust the difficulties of people in the new wards". He supported a reduction in the council size, but the retention of two members per ward. On election day, he won 25,484 votes, in third place on the four-seat board.

McCann ran again for a board seat in the 1952 election. During the campaign, McCann was uneasy about the state of the city's finances and still harped on the need for federal and provincial government spending on education. Despite this, he did state that "despite predictions... the city [has] been able to live within [its budgetary means]". He ran on the steady improvements he claimed that the board had made, namely a new fire station on Carling Avenue, and the extension of water and sewer services into new parts of the city, and he considered his work as head of the Works Department to be a "good job". On election day, McCann topped the poll in the Board of Control race, winning 38,982 votes, becoming Deputy Mayor of Ottawa in the process, which was confirmed by council at the beginning of the 1953–54 term. His position made him "nominally" in charge of the city's finance portfolio, which was shared with mayor Charlotte Whitton who sought more responsibilities than usual for a mayor. McCann was also appointed to the National Capital Planning Committee, Ottawa Planning Area Board and the Civic Superannuation Fund. As deputy mayor, McCann served as acting mayor when Whitton was not able to fulfill her duties, such as when she went to London, England, as the city's representative for the Coronation of Queen Elizabeth II in 1953.

McCann died in 1954 at the Ottawa Civic Hospital, following a sudden illness. At the time, he was planning on running for re-election in the 1954 election, though there was speculation he would run for mayor. Following his death, the city council voted to make Paul Tardif the city's new deputy mayor, and voted against filling McCann's vacant controller seat.

== Personal life ==
McCann had four children, two sons and two daughters. One of his sons, Leonard, was killed in action in 1944 in World War II, when the plane he was piloting was hit over Germany. His only other son, Dan Jr., died in 1948 from a rare sepsis, which may have been acquired while serving with the RCAF in the Middle East. McCann's brother Dave, was a coach and quarterback of the Ottawa Football Club.

McCann was a deeply religious evangelical Christian, and as a teetotaller, fought the spread of liquor stores, and implemented an opening prayer before council meetings. He was one of the founders of the Metropolitan Tabernacle, where he was a member of the choir, was on the board of deacons, and vice-chairman of the board. Every Sunday for 15 years, he was part of a church quartet that performed on CKCO radio. His favourite hobby was fishing, and he had a cottage near Venosta, Quebec.

McCann was interred at Beechwood Cemetery. The city named a street in Little Italy after him in 1962.
