= 1942 Ottawa municipal election =

The city of Ottawa, Canada held municipal elections on December 7, 1942.

== Mayor of Ottawa ==
Candidate	Votes	%
J. E. Stanley Lewis (X)	18,279	52.58
S. Leonard Belaire	7,496	21.56
C. E. Pickering	5,408	15.55
Lorenzo Lafleur	3,584	10.31

== Ottawa Board of Control ==
(4 elected)

Candidate	Votes	%
G. M. Geldert (X)	17,006	
Finley McRae	15,288	
E. A. Bourque (X)	14,853	
Grenville Goodwin	12,530	
Jim Forward (X)	12,087	
Fred Journeaux	10,213	
Martin M. Walsh	9,801	
Angus Smith	2,123	
Percy Bedford	1,649	
Max Feller	1,312	

== Ottawa City Council ==
(2 elected from each ward)

Rideau Ward
Candidate	Votes	%
Leslie Avery	928	
John Powers (X)	875	
W. D. Girard	353	
E. L. Schinzel	233	
Andrew Fairnie	116	

By Ward
Candidate	Votes	%
Eric Query (X)	Acclaimed	
J. Albert Parisien (X)	Acclaimed	

St. George's Ward
Candidate	Votes	%
Arthur Pinard (X)	Acclaimed	
Harold Taylor (X)	Acclaimed	

Wellington Ward
Candidate	Votes	%
Charles Parker	1,691	
Sam Chandler	1,487	
A. J. McEvoy	1,349	
C. A. McDonald	1,346	
Robert Burnett	785	

Capital Ward
Candidate	Votes	%
Edward Band (X)	2,839	
Joseph McCulloch (X)	2,473	
J. D. Fraser	1,270	

Dalhousie Ward
Candidate	Votes	%
Daniel McCann (X)	2,650	
Wilbert Hamilton (X)	2,100	
J. R. Sands	831	

Elmdale Ward
Candidate	Votes	%
Henry Bradley (X)	Acclaimed	
George Pingle (X)	Acclaimed	

Victoria Ward
Candidate	Votes	%
J. P. Nolan (X)	1,069	
Paul Tardif	989	
Joseph Allard	876	
D. A. Bonenfant	362	
Harvey Lacasse	271	
Ernest Arbour	237	

Ottawa Ward
Candidate	Votes	%
Napoleon Bordeleau (X)	1,737	
Aristide Belanger (X)	1,652	
Oscar Robitaille	1,008	

Riverdale Ward
Candidate	Votes	%
Len Coulter (X)	Acclaimed	
David McMillan (X)	Acclaimed	

Central Ward
Candidate	Votes	%
George F. Perley (X)	2,528	
J. Grant Shaw	1,278	
J. C. Thomas	1,154	
J. J. Enright	950	
