= 1946 Ottawa municipal election =

The city of Ottawa, Canada held municipal elections on December 9, 1946.

== Mayor of Ottawa ==
Candidate	Votes	%
J. E. Stanley Lewis (X)	22,650	87.76
Sydney T. Checkland	3,160	12.24

== Referendum ==
(Only property owners could vote in the referendum)

Ottawa Light, Heat and Power Company $3,500,000 Outlay
Option	Votes	%
For	6,838	81.80
Against	1,521	18.20

== Ottawa Board of Control ==
(4 elected)

Candidate	Votes	%
Grenville Goodwin (X)	16,737	
E. A. Bourque (X)	15,817	
G. M. Geldert (X)	15,795	
Finley McRae (X)	15,192	
Charles Boone	4,487	
Percy Bedford	3,170	

== Ottawa City Council ==
(2 elected from each ward)

Rideau Ward
Candidate	Votes	%
Leslie Avery (X)	Acclaimed	
John Powers (X)	Acclaimed	

By Ward
Candidate	Votes	%
Eric Query (X)	1,099	
Jules Morin (X)	1,032	
Paul E. Tasse	546	
Edgar Lachine	346	

St. George's Ward
Candidate	Votes	%
Roy Donaldson (X)	1,695	
William Newton	1,464	
Arthur Pinard (X)	1,361	

Wellington Ward
Candidate	Votes	%
Martin M. Walsh (X)	1,589	
Charles Parker (X)	1,569	
Sam Chandler	1,421	

Capital Ward
Candidate	Votes	%
Edward Band (X)	2,055	
Joseph McCulloch (X)	1,865	
J. A. Enstone	794	

Dalhousie Ward
Candidate	Votes	%
Daniel McCann (X)	1,745	
Wilbert Hamilton (X)	1,193	
James McAuley	1,019	
William J. Wills	437	
E. Kesterton	47	

Elmdale Ward
Candidate	Votes	%
Henry Bradley (X)	2,256	
George Pingle (X)	2,035	
R. A. Lefebvre	667	

Victoria Ward
Candidate	Votes	%
Paul Tardif (X)	1,615	
Frank Ellis (X)	1,003	
H. J. Lacasse	283	

Ottawa Ward
Candidate	Votes	%
Clem Aubin	1,675	36.72
Henri Rheaume	1,444	31.66
Aristide Belanger (X)	1,442	31.62

After election night, it appeared Belanger was elected to the second seat over Rheaume by seven votes. A recount showed that Rheaume had won the seat by two votes.

Riverdale Ward
Candidate	Votes	%
Len Coulter (X)	Acclaimed	
David McMillan (X)	Acclaimed	

Central Ward
Candidate	Votes	%
J. Grant Shaw (X)	1,587	
Fred Journeaux (X)	1,487	
Robert A. Legge	597	
E. A. Davis	485	
