= Roy Donaldson =

Canadian politician

Ottawa Controller Serving with Daniel McCann (1953–1954) Paul Tardif John Powers (1953–1954) George H. Nelms (1954–1955) Ernie Jones (1955–1956)
- In office 1953–1956
- Preceded by: Len Coulter
- Succeeded by: Wilbert Hamilton and Sam Berger

Ottawa Alderman Serving with Arthur Pinard (1945–1946) William Newton (1947–1948)
- In office 1945–1948
- Preceded by: Harold Taylor
- Succeeded by: Charlie St. Germain
- Constituency: St. George's Ward

Personal details
- Born: February 14, 1911 Sturgeon Falls, Ontario
- Died: August 13, 1977 (aged 66)
- Party: Progressive Conservative Party of Canada
- Spouse: Léonie Thivierge (m. 1940)
- Children: 1
- Profession: Civil servant, manager, businessman

Roy Donaldson (February 14, 1911 – August 13, 1977) was a Canadian politician. He served as an alderman on Ottawa City Council from 1945 to 1948 and as a controller on the Ottawa Board of Control from 1953 to 1956. He unsuccessfully ran for Mayor of Ottawa in the 1958 mayoral election. As an alderman, he was responsible for designating certain movies as "adult" and the establishment of the city's first wading pool at Strathcona Park. While serving on the city's Board of Control, his appointment by Mayor Charlotte Whitton to chair the playground committee "caused a stir among alderman, who felt their powers were being usurped". On the board, he often butted heads with Whitton.

== Early life ==
Donaldson was born in Sturgeon Falls, Ontario, the son of Edmond Donaldson and Irene Theriault. The family moved to Ottawa when he was one year old. In his youth, Donaldson had worked as a page boy at the Canadian House of Commons, and the Senate.

Donaldson began work with the civil service in 1930, working in the Administrative and Accounting Branch of the Department of Labour's Unemployment Relief Commission. He worked in the Department of Labour for 11 years before he was transferred to the equipment and aeronautical branch of the Royal Canadian Air Force (part of the Department of National Defence) for six years during World War II. He retired from the federal government in 1947, starting his own import-export business. He later became a manager for at Red Line Chemicals of Canada Ltd. Donaldson was a member of the Council of the Ottawa Junior Board of Trade, the Civil Service Association, and was one of the original members of the RA (Recreation Association of the Public Service of Canada). Later in life, he was a public relations representative for several industrial firms.

== Aldermanic career ==
=== 1944–1946 ===
Donaldson ran in the 1944 municipal election in St. George's Ward, running on a platform of appointing a full-time director of sports and recreation, and construction of a bridge across the Rideau Canal. The two-seat ward only had one incumbent, Arthur Pinard, as H. H. Taylor had retired. On election day, he won 1,504 votes, getting elected to the ward's second seat, winning 210 more than the third place candidate, James W. Jefferson. Following his election, he was appointed to the city's Old Age Pensions Board, and the city's Tree and Street Railway committees. In 1946, he helped form a winter carnival in his Sandy Hill neighbourhood, and was named the chairman of the committee in its charge. On council, he opposed allowing people to exchange houses and apartments, suggesting that it would create a hardship on people without housing in Ottawa, as he believed it favoured people moving into the city at the expense of Ottawans. He also believed inflationary assessments had prevented the construction of homes in the city. He also asked council to "take steps to ensure... cleaning up of untidy conditions at [the] By Ward Market." In terms of local traffic, he came out against a report to the city's traffic committee, suggesting the committee did not allow a complete survey of the city's traffic problems. He also came out against a suggestion that school crossing protection "might have to be curtailed", stating "[t]he safety ... of our school children is ... equally [as] important as ... of adult citizens". He ruffled feathers on the city's playgrounds committee when he suggested a playground in Sandy Hill was in a "state of abandonment", as those on the committee stated that it "had more [amenities] than any [other playground] in the city".

=== 1946–1948 ===
On November 20, 1946, Donaldson registered to run for re-election in the 1946 municipal election. On election day, he was re-elected in St. George's, this time, topping the poll, with 1,695 votes, over 300 more than his seatmate, Arthur Pinard, who finished third, losing his seat. Following his election, Donaldson was appointed to the Old Age Pensions Board, and the Street Railway and Smoke committees. During the 1947–48 term, he raised concerns over 'nuisances' he expected to come as a result of a new apartment complex in his ward, which he did admit would still help to relieve the city's housing shortage. As a member of the city's street railway committee, he came out against suggestions that the city's street car system "are as good as any on the continent", and stated that streetcars "belong to another era and are entirely obsolete... Buses are far more flexible and can be routed to far greater advantage around any traffic obstruction". Adding to his opposition to streetcars, he complained to the city's traffic committee about streetcars parked on Cobourg Street in his ward, as it "created considerable annoyance for residents and others using the street, and seriously impeded the flow of traffic". In September 1947, he was criticized by council for being concerned about the Bayview garbage dump's close proximity to the Lemieux Island filtration plant. Critics pointed out that Ottawa had the "finest water supply on the North American continent" and that the dump was down river half a mile from the plant. In December 1947, he filed a motion at council asking that the Board of Control do a survey of the system of numbering buildings in the city, and associated road signage. In January 1948, he requested a police constable be assigned to the intersection of Laurier Avenue and Nicholas Street during rush hour, but was rejected by the city's traffic committee. In March, he advocated for more "through streets" in Sandy Hill, as Range Road and Nicholas Street were being used by heavy vehicles to access Rideau Street, and residents were complaining about the traffic. In June, he asked council for the playgrounds commissioner be authorized to "negotiated and provide and out-of-town camp for playground use" during the summer, which he believed would "contribute materially to the health of Ottawa children.

== Controller bids ==
Heading into the 1948 municipal elections, Donaldson was rumoured as a possible candidate for the city's Board of Control, and by mid-October had been confirmed as a candidate. During the campaign, he came out in favour of bi-weekly garbage collection. He came out with a "four-point program", advocating "protection of the taxpayer's dollar, furthering of a youth program, emphasis on leadership and planning, and the effecting of 'drastic civic economy'". He also came out against annexing surrounding areas into the city, stating "we have no right to usurp the property of others". He also opposed building a new bridge over the Rideau Canal, which he believed would not remove the city's "traffic bottleneck" and would "dump traffic into Sandy Hill". On election day, Donaldson won 14,948 votes city-wide, placing sixth in the four seat race, nearly 3,000 votes behind fourth place C. E. Pickering. He did manage to win one ward however, in his home of St. George's.

In 1949, Donaldson was approached by Progressive Conservative Party of Canada and Independent groups to run in Ottawa East in the 1949 Canadian federal election, but declined their offers, saying he was committed to municipal politics.

On October 13, 1950, Donaldson confirmed that he was running for Ottawa's Board of Control once again in the 1950 municipal election. During the campaign, Donaldson complained that "[t]he past two years have been two of the worst in the city's administration... [t]here has been disunity, lack of leadership, a failure to accomplish anything". He also called the four members of the Board "babies", for doing "everything behind closed doors", refusing to "come out and play with... council". While campaigning he wore an emblem of a diaper and safety pin on his lapel to symbolize his view of the board. He promised that if elected, he would propose a by-law forbidding controllers from being on the executive of any outside board, believing it to be a full time job. One big issue during the election was the recent annexation of parts of Nepean and Gloucester Townships into the city. Donaldson believed residents of the newly annexed areas should not have to pay full taxes until they received full services. On election day, he again finished in sixth place, winning 20,180 votes, over 4,000 votes behind Paul Tardif, who won the fourth Board spot. This time, Donaldson dropped to third place in his home ward of St. George's, but finished second in By and Ottawa Wards.

== Board of Control ==
=== 1952 campaign ===
On October 24, 1952, Donaldson announced he would try yet again to run for a spot on the city's Board of Control in the 1952 municipal elections, saying "[t]his time I believe I will make it". His platform was stated as "commonsense and co-operation in civic administration". During the campaign, he was the only controller candidate who came out in favour of Sunday sports, which was on the ballot as a referendum. He also promised "[i]mprovements in creation facilities and careful consideration of all civic business". On election day, he placed third on the four seat board, finally getting elected, winning 32,295 votes city-wide. He didn't place first in any ward, but he did finish second in Wards 2 (By) and 3 (St. George's). His win was credited to his extensive campaigning, including "buttonholing" people on Sparks Street, and "appearing at all kinds of meetings". Following his election, he was appointed to the Firemen's Superannuation and Civil Emergency Committee. On the Board of Control, he was given the fire department, markets and "office re-organization" portfolios. It was believed that Donaldson was disappointed over his "hodge-podge" of portfolios. He was added to the city's municipal recreation committee in February 1953, of which he was named chair. That same month, he was named liaison officer between the federal and civic planning committees in order to prepare for local celebrations of the Coronation of Elizabeth II. Donaldson later announced that for the coronation celebrations, he was going to wear $300 (over $3,400 in 2024 dollars) worth of "accoutrements" for the coronation. For the "going away tea" held to celebrate mayor Charlotte Whitton and her secretary's departure for the Coronation, Donaldson ended up wearing knife-edged grey trousers, a black director's coat, stiff collar and a maroon waistcoat with lapels.

=== 1953–1954 ===
In his first term, he called on streets to be repaved every 25 years. In April 1953, a youth attempted to kick Donaldson in the stomach, and was charged for disorderly conduct after Donaldson was able to single him out at a local restaurant. In August 1953, he travelled to Hamilton, Ontario, with three others on a fact finding tour and provided advice about the location of farmers' markets. The trip was controversial, as the board was divided on whether or not it had authorized it. In September 1953, he complained to the Board about the "poor condition" of Montreal Road, suggesting it was "preventing tourists from visiting" the city. That month, he also called for a meeting to look into building a new football stadium for high school teams. In November, Donaldson complained about the city's "piecemeal planning" which was preventing the city from becoming a "proud national capital", highlighting the construction of the Mackenzie King Bridge which he called a "white elephant". In December, he "blasted" city council for refusing construction of a gym at Riverview Public School, which was requested by the Riverview Park Property Owners' Association.

At the beginning of 1954, Donaldson floated the idea of running for mayor in the 1954 mayoral election. In March, he and fellow controller Paul Tardif got into a "verbal battle" with mayor Whitton over their opposition to a pre-stressed concrete and asphalt plan to be built on Merivale Road, which included what she thought were "libellous statements". In April, Donaldson came out against what he called the "'promiscuous' razing of Ottawa homes by the Housing Standards Board (HSB)." He opposed the HSB condemning homes without involving the Board of Control. Later in the month, he stated that the decision to leave out the Board of Trade from the city's new traffic survey committee was "a direct insult" to the board, after he had pushed for their inclusion. Following the deaths of three women in fire on York Street in June, Donaldson moved for a "vote of sympathy" at council for the families of the victims, and "paid tribute" to the firefighters. In July, Donaldson again clashed with Mayor Whitton, stating that the "'befuddled administration' was causing unnecessary delay in the laying of much-needed water and sewer services." Whitton suggested that the delays were caused by "controllers and aldermen taking up the time of department heads, and city engineers 'with two-inch potholes and other silly nonsense'". In August, Donaldson and fellow controller John Powers failed at an attempt to pass a bylaw exempting the Central Canada Exhibition Association form "the payment of taxes". Donaldson said that "[i]t was never intended that the exhibition association should pay taxes", claiming "[t]hey don't do it any place else in Ontario".

=== 1954–1956 ===
On November 13, 1954, Donaldson announced he was running for re-election to the city's Board of Control in the 1954 municipal election, deciding against running for mayor. During the campaign, he suggested that the city should purchase the Carleton County courthouse in order to use it as a city hall for Ottawa. On election day, Donaldson was re-elected to the Board of Control, finishing in third on the four-seat Board, winning 32,140 votes. He once again finished in second place in Wards 2 (By) and 3 (St. George's), and also finished second in Ward 4 (Wellington). Following his re-election, his first move was to introduce a motion at city council to build a new city hall on Elgin Street. The city had been without a proper city hall since the previous one burned down in 1931. During a record snowfall in January 1955, Donaldson butted heads with mayor Whitton again when he criticized the city's snow-clogged streets. Donaldson stated "[y]our are unduly alarming the citizens with your talk of a record snowfall. What is needed is more equipment". Following plans for mayor Whitton and Finance Commissioner A. H. Ritchie to resign in the Summer, Donaldson announced he would form a voluntary committee of councillors to prepare a testimonial dinner in their honour. Following this announcement, Whitton stated she would refuse "to be a corpse at (his) wake", stating she'll "choose (her) own pallbearers". Whitton had named him as a member of a "power group" on council who was trying to "usurp" her. Whitton ultimately did not resign. In August, Donaldson came out saying the streets in the city were "filthy", charging that the city's engineering department was doing a poor housekeeping job in "allocating funds for road cleaning", and blamed a reduction in the number of street-cleaners in the city. In October, Donaldson was named to the Central Canada Exhibition Association (CCEA) board of directors. In December, there were reports Donaldson was considering running for mayor of the city in the 1956 municipal elections. Also in December, Donaldson and alderman May Nickson spearheaded a vote to back water fluoridation in the city, and to bypass having a city-wide plebiscite on the issue, much to the chagrin of mayor Whitton.

Donaldson was named to the Firemen's Superannuation and Benefit Fund once again for 1956. He was also appointed chairman of the Women's Handicraft and Women's Institute Committee for the CCEA. He surprised the committee with his "wide knowledge of things like women's handicraft", which he owed to his wife being a designer. When council approved the site of Ottawa's new City Hall on Green Island, Donaldson, who supported the Confederation Square site stated "[y]ou will regret this forever, this selling of the very heart of the city". In May 1956, he came out in favour of city hall staff working just five days a week, suggesting they had nothing to do on Saturday when other workers in the city were off then. In July 1956, Donaldson came under fire when former Fire Chief John Foote accused him of using undue political pressure in relation to fire department appointments and dismissal during a judicial inquiry. Donaldson denied Foote's allegations, stating "I have never at any time and in any way exerted any political pressure on the Fire Chief to do anything". Later in the month, Donaldson announced that the Board of Control would be looking into recommending the setting up of an "Independent Industrial Commission to look after the whole question of encouraging industrial development" in the city. In October, Donaldson came out in support of the city's new Parking Authority, disassociating himself from the remarks of Mayor Whitton and Controller Tardif who had been critical.

== Defeat ==
On November 21, 1956, Donaldson announced he was running for re-election to the Board of Control in the 1956 municipal election. In the election, Donaldson won 23,127 votes, finishing fifth, missing out on the fourth and final board sport, which waswon by Sam Berger, by fewer than 900 votes. Donaldson finished as high as second place in Rideau, By, and his home St. George's Ward, but faltered in the suburbs, which propelled him to defeat. After his loss, he indicated he would return to run again in two years, possibly for mayor. At the start of the 1957–58 council, it was announced that he would be appointed a post with the civic Parking Authority, and with it a $3,000 ($32,000 in 2024 dollars) pay-cheque. However, the authority's chairman suddenly resigned, leaving it with a single member, making it "technically non-existent", and so council decided to refer the matter back to the Board of Control. Donaldson later lost interest in the position after council decided to drop its honorarium.

There were rumours that Donaldson would run for the Progressive Party of Canada in the 1957 Canadian federal election in Ottawa East. He ultimately did not run. He was again rumoured to run for the party in the 1958 federal election, but ultimately did not file nomination papers.

== Run for Mayor ==
On November 4, 1958, Donaldson filed his nomination papers to run for Mayor of Ottawa in the 1958 municipal election. Donaldson charged that the administration of mayor George Nelms had been negligent, inefficient and passed the buck. He stated that if elected, he would "not be a part-time mayor", and would include have a listed telephone number (as opposed to Nelms). He also stated that if the mayor had "taken adequate precautions in ensuring the safety of the gas distributing system in the city", a recent "disastrous explosion would not have occurred". He defended his record as controller, taking "'full credit' for reorganization of the Fire Department... raising it from the state of 'considerable demoralization'". When it came to his opposition to the building of the Mackenzie King Bridge, he claimed it "still does not take traffic off Rideau Street". He went on to say that he "pioneered in the fight for industrial development, and Ottawa sewage disposal plant and improvement in cross town arteries and traffic facilities... increased recreation services, built new rinks and playgrounds and expanded the day camp program". On election day, he won nearly 10,000 votes, nearly 20,000 behind mayor Nelms. He finished third in every ward in the city. After his defeat, Donaldson stated he remained "undaunted", and would try again in the next election.

== Later runs for Board of Control ==
=== 1960 ===
In January 1960, Donaldson was considered as a possible replacement for alderman May Nickson who was resigning her St. George's seat on city council. Council eventually choice Cecile O'Regan instead. After speculation that he'd run for mayor again in the 1960 elections, he announced on September 16 that he was running for Board of Control again, stating that the Board "needs leadership and experience at a time when there will be vacancies to be filled". During the campaign he blamed the administration of "'duplication and overlapping' of city services... (costing) taxpayers 'hundreds of thousands of dollars'". He indicated a need for coordination of services under a city manager, claimed the Board had "failed greatly in many problems", taking the "lesser way out' in awarding ... private garbage collection", he criticized traffic bylaws, and with "'bungling' the hospital question". On election day, he finished in fifth place, just 1,499 votes behind the fourth place candidate, Wilbert Hamilton who won the fourth spot on the board. He again placed second in Rideau, By, and St. George's Wards. After the election, he dropped plans asking for a recount.

=== 1962 ===
In early November 1962, Donaldson announced he was running again for a Board of Control seat in the 1962 municipal election. During the campaign, he pointed out Ottawa's rising $150,000,000 ($1,520,000,000 in 2024 dollars) debt, and called for a "greater share of the tax burden to be assumed by the federal government". He claimed the city "faced serious taxation problems" and that the city's administration did "nothing but talk" when it came to housing and urban renewal problems". He stated that council was "flying headstrong into public housing and putting projects where they are detrimental", suggesting instead that rent should be subsidized. He also stated that the city should "take advantage of all the grants available for the 1967 Canadian Centennial", and that the city had not "put forward a single plan for (the) Centennial" and had "abandoned its responsibility to the youth of the city". He also proposed building a civic centre for the centennial. He also stated that the city was "failing to provide services for industry (resulting in) many firms.. settling elsewhere". On election day, Donaldson once again finished 5th on the four seat board, missing the last spot, which was won by Ernie Jones by just under 5,000 votes. Donaldson won a total of 31,766 votes, with his highest placement coming in Dalhousie Ward, where he finished third.

=== 1964 ===
On November 13, 1964, Donaldson announced he would try yet again to regain his former Board of Control seat in the 1964 municipal election. During the campaign he stated that the city was "facing a critical period in the provision of welfare and hospital services", and called for a "review of federal government grants in lieu of taxes". On election day, Donaldson won 27,878 votes, in sixth place on the four seat board. He missed the last seat, won by Murray Heit by 5,002 votes. He finished as high as fourth in By and Dalhousie Wards. After his defeat, he said that it "was doubtful he would run again".

=== 1969 ===
Donaldson did not run in the 1966 election, but unexpectedly entered the race for Board of Control in the 1969 race. Donaldson had praise for the outgoing council, but because so many incumbents were retiring, he thought the Board could use his experience. HE stated that he would "tackle rising taxes, work on a solution to duplication caused by two-tier municipal government, ... push for more downtown parking", and that "social services must also be streamlined and much must be done to encourage industrial and tourism development, curb air and water pollution, and to develop the downtown core." He also came out in support of "one-tier local government", the "need for better sidewalks, streets, and sewers", and the "construction of utility tunnels beneath streets where (they) could be easily repaired without tearing up pavement". He also opposed downtown freeways, believing the city should focus on improving "the existing arterial road system". Donaldson wasn't able to campaign for several nights after coming down with the flu, and it was thought that his campaign had "been much less vigorous" than the other candidates. Indeed, on election day, Donaldson finished last, winning just over 13,000 votes, over 16,000 votes behind the fourth place Ernie Jones, who won the last seat. The only ward he did not finish in last place was By Ward.

== Personal life and death ==
Donaldson attended St. Joseph's Church. He died in hospital in 1977 and was interred at Notre Dame Cemetery. He was married and had one child.
