= 1948 Ottawa municipal election =

The city of Ottawa, Canada held municipal elections on December 6, 1948.

== Mayor of Ottawa ==
Candidate	Votes	%
E. A. Bourque	16,150	35.17
Grenville Goodwin	15,229	33.16
G. M. Geldert	14,547	31.67

== Ottawa Board of Control ==
(4 elected)

Candidate	Votes	%
Len Coulter	23,330	
Dan McCann	21,267	
Paul Tardif	20,067	
C. E. Pickering	17,779	
Stan Higman	16,512	
Roy Donaldson	14,948	
S. Leonard Belaire	9,856	
Charles Boone	4,024	

== Ottawa City Council ==
(2 elected from each ward)

Rideau Ward
Candidate	Votes	%
Leslie Avery (X)	1,415	
John Powers (X)	1,175	
Tony Arbour	474	
Thomas Hubert	131	

By Ward
Candidate	Votes	%
Eric Query (X)	1,568	
Jules Morin (X)	1,548	
B. E. Tasse	628	
J. T. Legault	338	

St. George's Ward
Candidate	Votes	%
William Newton (X)	2,172	
Charlie St. Germain	1,288	
A. Beaulieu	1,090	
Arthur Moeser	987	
J. R. Pilon	942	
Lawrence McLean	781	
David Langlier	510	
C. E. Rocque	442	
C. T. Prott	132	

Wellington Ward
Candidate	Votes	%
Martin M. Walsh (X)	2,745	
Charles Parker	2,561	
Sam Chandler	2,125	

Capital Ward
Candidate	Votes	%
Edward Band (X)	2,764	
Noel Ogilvie	1,721	
Tom Davidson	1,345	
Parlane Christie (X)	1,244	
Maurice J. Murphy	1,176	
J. H. Sheppard	417	

Dalhousie Ward
Candidate	Votes	%
Wilbert Hamilton (X)	2,281	
James McAuley	1,481	
W. P. Kerwin	949	
W. J. W. Wills	815	
M. C. Anderson	645	
John J. Kennedy	547	
Joseph Raymond	385	
Edward Ayoub	293	

Elmdale Ward
Candidate	Votes	%
Henry Bradley (X)	3,736	
Roly Wall	2,653	
Jack Norris	1,336	
Ludlum Hawkins	1,198	
Marjorie Mann	869	
John Defalco	372	
H. Cluff	103	

Victoria Ward
Candidate	Votes	%
Frank Ellis (X)	1,556	
Joseph Allard	1,359	
John J. Hartnett	499	
Hector Chartier	358	
Albert Levesque	282	

Ottawa Ward
Candidate	Votes	%
Clem Aubin (X)	1,809	34.12
Aristide Belanger	1,642	30.97
Henri Rheaume (X)	1,640	30.93
Larry Lanthier	211	3.98

Election day vote totals showed Belanger ahead of Rheaume by seven votes. A recount found that he defeated Rheaume by two votes.

Riverdale Ward
Candidate	Votes	%
David McMillan (X)	2,211	
Victor Irish	1,277	
George Sloan	1,218	
Dean G. Cowan	1,921	
R. George Pushman	978	
Ivan Sparks	587	
M. S. Carrigan	389	
Thomas H. C. Shipman	335	

Central Ward
Candidate	Votes	%
J. Grant Shaw (X)	2,392	
Fred Journeaux (X)	2,277	
C. M. Marshall	2,017	
Roger Webber	1,010	
