= 1950 Ottawa municipal election =

The city of Ottawa, Canada, held municipal elections on December 4, 1950.

To date, this election elected the most members of city council in Ottawa history. 28 aldermen from 14 wards, plus 4 controllers and the mayor for a total of 33 on council. Voters overwhelmingly voted to reduce the council down to 18 aldermen in a plebiscite which saw its largest opposition in the more francophone Ottawa and By Wards.

The mayoral race featured the same three candidates as the 1948 race. However, Goodwin defeated Bourque this time. He would only serve for 9 months however, as he died on August 27, 1951. He was replaced by city controller Dr. Charlotte Whitton, the first female controller in city history.

Three new wards were added to council, due to the annexation of parts of Nepean Township and Gloucester Township. Gloucester Ward held a special election on January 2, 1950, while Carleton and Westboro Wards held elections on December 19, 1949.

== Mayor of Ottawa ==
Candidate	Votes	%
Grenville Goodwin	28,698	47.60
E. A. Bourque (X)	18,668	30.96
George Mackinley Geldert	12,928	21.44

== Referendum ==
Council reduction
Candidate	Votes	%
Yes	44,038	82.59
No	9,280	17.41

== Ottawa Board of Control ==
(4 elected)

Candidate	Votes	%
Charlotte Whitton	38,405	22.20
Len Coulter (X)	31,071	17.95
Dan McCann (X)	25,484	14.73
Paul Tardif (X)	24,265	13.99
C. E. Pickering (X)	22,687	13.11
Roy Donaldson	20,180	11.66
Frank Ellis	10,988	6.36

== Ottawa City Council ==
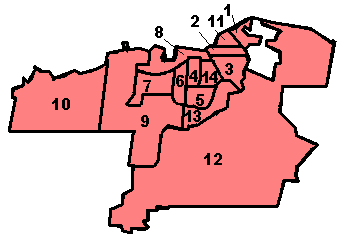
Map of Ottawa's Wards used in this election: 1. Rideau Ward; 2. By Ward; 3. St. George's Ward; 4. Wellington Ward; 5. Capital Ward; 6. Dalhousie Ward; 7. Elmdale Ward; 8. Victoria Ward; 9. Westboro Ward; 10. Carleton Ward; 11. Ottawa Ward; 12. Gloucester Ward; 13. Riverdale Ward; 14. Central Ward

(2 elected from each ward)

Rideau Ward
Candidate	Votes	%
Leslie Avery (X)	1,244	
John Powers (X)	1,239	
Joseph C. LeBlanc	598	
Thomas Hubert	302	

By Ward
Candidate	Votes	%
Jules Morin (X)	1,839	
Eric Query (X)	1,777	
Aldege Soott	393	

St. George's Ward
Candidate	Votes	%
Charlie St. Germain (X)	3,691	
William Newton (X)	2,250	
Sam McLean	1,490	
Arthur Moeser	728	
H. Robert O'Hara	571	
Henri Robert	344	

Wellington Ward
Candidate	Votes	%
Martin M. Walsh (X)	3,012	
Charles Parker (X)	2,724	
Sam Chandler	1,441	
Gilbert F. Johnson	1,144	

Capital Ward
Candidate	Votes	%
Noel Ogilvie (X)	2,778	
Parlane Christie	2,342	
Tom Davison	2,179	
Maurice J. Murphy	1,303	
William T. Lewis	602	

Dalhousie Ward
Candidate	Votes	%
Wilbert Hamilton (X)	2,651	
James McAuley (X)	2,352	
William J. Wills	1,170	
W. Percy Kerwin	961	
Edward Ayoub	550	

Elmdale Ward
Candidate	Votes	%
Henry Bradley (X)	3,408	
Roly Wall (X)	3,296	
Lee Rickey	2,405	
Jack Norris	1,900	
George Blouin	518	

Victoria Ward
Candidate	Votes	%
Lon Campbell	1,447	
Joseph Allard (X)	1,206	
Paul Dufour	835	
Conrad Vezina	449	
Hector Jodoin	388	
J. J. Hartnett	366	
Hector Chartier	281	
H. J. Lacasse	165	

Westboro Ward
Candidate	Votes	%
Ernie Jones (X)	Acclaimed	
Henry Parslow (X)	Acclaimed	

Carleton Ward
Candidate	Votes	%
Frank Boyce (X)	1,952	
Howard Henry (X)	1,882	
William Simpson	860	

Ottawa Ward
Candidate	Votes	%
Clem Aubin (X)	1,895	
Henri Rheaume	1,751	
Aristide Belanger (X)	1,442	

Gloucester Ward
Candidate	Votes	%
Archie Newman (X)	2,465	
Pat Doherty	2,203	
Alex Roger (X)	2,048	

Riverdale Ward
Candidate	Votes	%
David McMillan (X)	2,885	
George Sloan	2,753	
Victor Irish (X)	2,124	
Ivan Sparks	1,096	

Central Ward
Candidate	Votes	%
J. Grant Shaw (X)	2,768	
Fred Journeaux (X)	2,320	
Cyril George Marshall	2,179	
Roger Webber	991	
