= 1939 Ottawa municipal election =

The city of Ottawa, Canada held municipal elections on December 4, 1939.

== Mayor of Ottawa ==
Candidate	Votes	%
J. E. Stanley Lewis (X)	15,685	47.70
Finley McRae	11,941	36.31
S. Leonard Belaire	5,260	15.99

== Plebiscite ==
2 year council terms
Option	Votes	%
For	19,067	59.49
Against	11,185	40.51

== Ottawa Board of Control ==
(4 elected)

Candidate	Votes	%
E. A. Bourque (X)	13,674	
George MacKinley Geldert (X)	13,479	
Jim Forward	12,920	
John Harold Putman (X)	12,577	
Grenville Goodwin	10,761	
William Henry Marsden	10,507	
Thomas Brethour	7,631	
Arthur Ellis	4,289	
Percy Edwin Bedford	1,488	
Caleb S. Green	967	
Max Feller	940	
Edward E. Kesterton	269	

== Ottawa City Council ==
2 elected from each ward

Rideau Ward
Candidate	Votes	%
John Powers (X)	687	
A. W. Spearman	680	
Wilfrid D. Girard	573	
Fred Goodhouse (X)	490	
Max Schoen	218	

By Ward
Candidate	Votes	%
J. Albert Parisien (X)	1,279	
Eric Query (X)	1,039	
Marcel Dupuis	974	
James C. Butler	338	

St. George's Ward
Candidate	Votes	%
Arthur Pinard (X)	1,892	
Hamnett P. Hill, Jr.	1,645	
Harold Taylor (X)	1,608	

Wellington Ward
Candidate	Votes	%
Martin M. Walsh (X)	2,195	
Arthur J. Ash (X)	1,967	
Robert Burnett	984	
William A. Coe	260	

Capital Ward
Candidate	Votes	%
Edward Band (X)	2,562	
C. E. Pickering (X)	2,372	
J. H. Fraser	1,124	

Dalhousie Ward
Candidate	Votes	%
Daniel McCann (X)	Acclaimed	
Wilbert Hamilton (X)	Acclaimed	

Elmdale Ward
Candidate	Votes	%
David Sprague	2,148	
Henry Bradley (X)	1,666	
George Pingle (X)	1,653	
Cecil D. Norris	808	

Victoria Ward
Candidate	Votes	%
Nelson J. Lacasse (X)	1,364	
J. P. Nolan (X)	1,362	
Joseph Allard	1,139	

Ottawa Ward
Candidate	Votes	%
Aristide Belanger (X)	1,637	
Napoleon Bordeleau (X)	1,623	
A. E. Beauchamp	1,134	

Riverdale Ward
Candidate	Votes	%
David McMillan (X)	1,568	
Len Coulter	1,505	
George Sloan (X)	1,269	
John McLennan	840	
Samuel Dibartolo	445	

Central Ward
Candidate	Votes	%
George F. Perley (X)	2,205	
Fred Journeaux (X)	2,088	
J. Grant Shaw	1,463	
