= 1940 Ottawa municipal election =

The city of Ottawa, Canada held municipal elections on December 2, 1940.

== Mayor of Ottawa ==
Candidate	Votes	%
J. E. Stanley Lewis (X)	19,729	67.79
S. Leonard Belaire	11,692	32.21

== Ottawa Board of Control ==
(4 elected)

Candidate	Votes	%
Chester E. Pickering	13,004	
G. M. Geldert (X)	12,955	
E. A. Bourque (X)	12,417	
Jim Forward (X)	12,416	
David Sprague	12,190	
Grenville Goodwin	10,830	
H. Stanley Higman	10,086	
Thomas Brethour	5,484	
Joseph A. Parisien	1,963	
Percy Edwin Bedford	1,239	

== Ottawa City Council ==
(2 elected from each ward)

Rideau Ward
Candidate	Votes	%
John Powers (X)	947	
A. W. Spearman (X)	905	
Max G. Schoen	300	

By Ward
Candidate	Votes	%
Eric Query (X)	Acclaimed	
J. Albert Parisien (X)	Acclaimed	

St. George's Ward
Candidate	Votes	%
Arthur Pinard (X)	1,687	
Harold Taylor	1,630	
Hamnett P. Hill, Jr. (X)	1,415	
Walter Cunningham	602	

Wellington Ward
Candidate	Votes	%
Martin M. Walsh (X)	1,942	
Arthur J. Ash (X)	1,506	
Christie A. McDonald	1,266	
Robert Burnett	568	
James P. Behan	278	
William A. Coe	79	

Capital Ward
Candidate	Votes	%
Edward Band	2,065	
Joseph McCulloch	1,416	
W. Earl Linttell	1,152	
Roy F. Fleming	835	
Parlane Christie	600	
C. W. Grant	439	
J. D. Fraser	221	

Dalhousie Ward
Candidate	Votes	%
Daniel McCann (X)	2,220	
Wilbert Hamilton (X)	1,662	
Joseph J. Kennedy	1,072	
James R. Sands	437	

Elmdale Ward
Candidate	Votes	%
Henry Bradley (X)	2,448	
George Pingle	1,929	
W. H. Marsden	1,182	

Victoria Ward
Candidate	Votes	%
J. P. Nolan (X)	1,342	
Nelson J. Lacasse (X)	1,165	
Joseph Allard	1,092	

Ottawa Ward
Candidate	Votes	%
Aristide Belanger (X)	1,680	
Napoleon Bordeleau (X)	1,492	
Oscar Robitaille	1,095	

Riverdale Ward
Candidate	Votes	%
Len Coulter (X)	1,978	
David McMillan (X)	1,771	
George Sloan	1,212	
Samuel Dibartolo	185	

Central Ward
Candidate	Votes	%
George F. Perley (X)	2,403	
Fred Journeaux (X)	2,082	
James J. Enright	736	
