= 1938 Ottawa municipal election =

The city of Ottawa, Canada held municipal elections on December 5, 1938.

== Mayor of Ottawa ==
Candidate	Votes	%
J. E. Stanley Lewis (X)	17,958	49.15
William H. Marsden	11,457	31.36
George H. Dunbar	6,788	18.58
Caleb S. Green	201	0.55
William Watson	133	0.36

== Plebiscites ==
(only property owners could vote)

$225,000 for reconstructing city's fire alarm system
Option	Votes	%
Against	4,720	50.02
For	4,717	49.98

$800,000 for the erection of civic buildings
Option	Votes	%
Against	5,224	55.37
For	4,210	44.63

== Ottawa Board of Control ==
(4 elected)

Candidate	Votes	%
Finley McRae	18,805	
G. M. Geldert (X)	18,131	
E. A. Bourque (X)	14,773	
J. H. Putman (X)	13,931	
Jim Forward	12,538	
Thomas Brethour	9,302	
Arthur Ellis	6,140	
Joseph A. Parisien	3,038	
Percy E. Bedford	1,770	
Cecil Elbourne	954	
Max Feller	878	
E. E. Kesterton	362	

== Ottawa City Council ==
(2 elected from each ward)

Rideau Ward
Candidate	Votes	%
John Powers (X)		
Fred Goodhouse (X)		
W. D. Girard		

By Ward
Candidate	Votes	%
J. Albert Parisien (X)		
Eric Query (X)		
Marcel Dupuis		
J. H. Legault		
J. P. Butler		

St. George's Ward
Candidate	Votes	%
Arthur Pinard (X)		
Harold Taylor (X)		
J. J. O'Leary		
A. A. Moeser		
A. C. H. Fox		

Wellington Ward
Candidate	Votes	%
Martin M. Walsh (X)	Acclaimed	
Arthur J. Ash (X)	Acclaimed	

Capital Ward
Candidate	Votes	%
Edward Band (X)		
C. E. Pickering		
Harold D. Marshall (X)		

Dalhousie Ward
Candidate	Votes	%
Daniel McCann (X)		
Wilbert Hamilton (X)		
R. W. Dawson		
Joseph F. Raymond		

Elmdale Ward
Candidate	Votes	%
George Pingle (X)		
Henry Bradley (X)		
Cecil B. Morris		
D. R. Grant		
George Barker		

Victoria Ward
Candidate	Votes	%
Nelson J. Lacasse		
Joseph P. Nolan (X)		
Joseph Allard (X)		
J. R. Welch		

Ottawa Ward
Candidate	Votes	%
Aristide Belanger (X)		
Napoleon Bordeleau (X)		
A. E. Beauchamp		

Riverdale Ward
Candidate	Votes	%
David McMillan (X)		
George Sloan (X)		
John McLennan		
T. C. Boucher		

Central Ward
Candidate	Votes	%
George F. Perley (X)		
Fred Journeaux (X)		
W. R. Low		
Mrs. H. G. Barber		
