= 1936 Ottawa municipal election =

The city of Ottawa, Canada held municipal elections on December 7, 1936.

== Mayor of Ottawa ==
Candidate	Votes	%
J. E. Stanley Lewis (X)	22,065	84.55
A. H. Cole	3,025	11.59
William Watson	1,008	3.86

== Plebiscites ==
(Only property owners could vote)

$350,000 for Sewer Construction
Option	Votes	%
No	3,471	
Yes	3,460	

Reduction in tax rate
Option	Votes	%
Yes	4,248	
No	2,615	

== Ottawa Board of Control ==
(4 elected)

Candidate	Votes	%
G. M. Geldert (X)	12,865	
George H. Dunbar (X)	11,531	
Allan B. Turner (X)	10,545	
E. A. Bourque	9,761	
J. Edward McVeigh	9,464	
Thomas Brethour	8,597	
A. W. Spearman	6,153	
Percy Bedford	1,178	
Joseph McHugh	596	
Alex Leckie	383	
Charles E. Goulden	303	
E. E. Kesterten	265	

== Ottawa City Council ==
(2 elected from each ward)

Rideau Ward
Candidate	Votes	%
John Powers	625	
Fred Goodhouse	624	
Shirley S. Slinn	608	
Ernest Bedard	428	
John Barrett	107	

By Ward
Candidate	Votes	%
J. Albert Parisien (X)	1,323	
Eric Query (X)	1,031	
James Butler	550	
Jacob Appelbaum	206	
J. R. Croteau	188	

St. George's Ward
Candidate	Votes	%
Norman H. MacDonald (X)	1,541	
Arthur Pinard (X)	1,478	
Arthur A. Moeser	748	
Albert Laurence	638	
George Powell	92	
Cecil Elbourne	81	

Wellington Ward
Candidate	Votes	%
Arthur J. Ash (X)	1,704	
James W. McNabb (X)	1,595	
Marin M. Walsh	1,525	

Capital Ward
Candidate	Votes	%
Edward Band (X)	1,941	
Harold D. Marshall (X)	1,606	
A. T. MacFarlane	808	

Dalhousie Ward
Candidate	Votes	%
Daniel McCann (X)	1,836	
Wilbert Hamilton (X)	1,488	
Richard W. Dawson	798	
James R. Sands	711	
George C. Douglas	199	

Elmdale Ward
Candidate	Votes	%
William H. Marsden (X)	1,306	
Jim Forward (X)	1,240	
Henry Bradley	838	
Harry Low	698	

Victoria Ward
Candidate	Votes	%
Nelson J. Lacasse (X)	1,237	
Joseph P. Nolan (X)	1,099	
M. Romuald Tessier	513	
D. Bonnenfant	406	
William McGlancey	238	

Ottawa Ward
Candidate	Votes	%
Aristide Belanger (X)	1,441	
A. Edmond Beauchamp	1,350	
Napoleon Bordeleau	1,303	

Riverdale Ward
Candidate	Votes	%
David McMillan (X)	1,540	
George Sloan (X)	1,363	
T. Carroll Boucher	539	

Central Ward
Candidate	Votes	%
Fred Jounreaux (X)	Acclaimed	
Finley McRae (X)	Acclaimed	
