= 1931 Ottawa municipal election =

Ontarian Municipal Election

The city of Ottawa, Canada held municipal elections on December 7, 1931.

== Mayor of Ottawa ==
Candidate	Votes	%
John J. Allen (X)	Acclaimed	

== Ottawa Board of Control ==
(4 elected)

Candidate	Votes	%
Fulgence Charpentier	12,881	
Daniel McCann	12,026	
George H. Dunbar (X)	11,394	
G. M. Geldert (X)	10,510	
Gerald Sims	10,461	
Charles J. Tulley	9,215	
J. E. Stanley Lewis (X)	8,849	
J. W. York (X)	7,101	
Andrew F. Macallum	6,917	

== Ottawa City Council ==
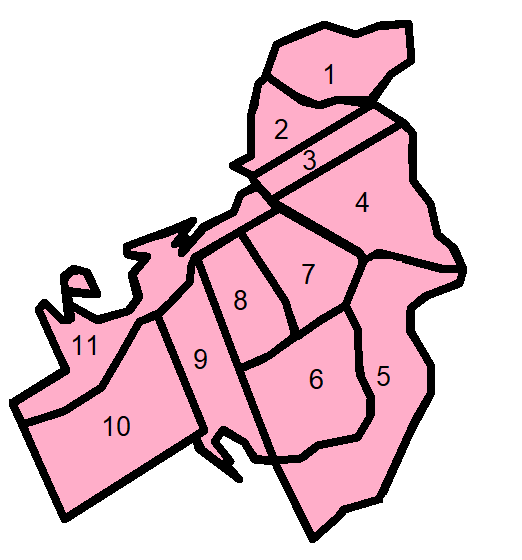
Map of Ottawa's Wards used in this election: 1. Rideau Ward; 2. Ottawa Ward; 3. By Ward; 4. St. George's Ward; 5. Riverdale Ward; 6. Capital Ward; 7. Central Ward; 8. Wellington Ward; 9. Dalhousie Ward; 10. Elmdale Ward; 11. Victoria Ward

(2 elected from each ward)

Rideau Ward
Candidate	Votes	%
Rod Plant (X)	Acclaimed	
Thomas Brethour (X)	Acclaimed	

By Ward
Candidate	Votes	%
Alfred W. Desjardins (X)	1,422	
Joseph Albert Parisien	1,284	
Eric Query (X)	1,103	

St. George's Ward
Candidate	Votes	%
Norman H. MacDonald (X)	1,766	
George J. O'Connor	995	
Rodolphe Girard	982	
Jean Genest	874	
John Hutchingame	697	
Sam Berger	656	
Max Feller	138	

Wellington Ward
Candidate	Votes	%
James W. McNabb	2,313	
J. Edward McVeigh	2,090	
Garnet E. Faith	1,194	

Capital Ward
Candidate	Votes	%
Edward Band	2,197	
Harold D. Marshall	1,624	
P. J. Nolan	1,315	
James A. Reid	960	

Dalhousie Ward
Candidate	Votes	%
E. P. McGrath (X)	1,896	
Wilbert Hamilton	1,575	
James J. McVeigh	1,317	
Alfred Eales	985	

Elmdale Ward
Candidate	Votes	%
William H. Marsden (X)	Acclaimed	
Jim Forward (X)	Acclaimed	

Victoria Ward
Candidate	Votes	%
John R. Welch (X)	1,568	
Nelson J. Lacasse	1,230	
Ernest Laroche	1,133	

Ottawa Ward
Candidate	Votes	%
Aristide Belanger (X)	Acclaimed	
Wilfrid J. St. Aubin (X)	Acclaimed	

Riverdale Ward
Candidate	Votes	%
George Sloan	2,020	
George Pushman	1,670	
David McMillan	944	

Central Ward
Candidate	Votes	%
Kirby Bangs	1,739	
William R. Low	1,628	
Harold C. Shipman	1,464	
Joseph C. Thoms	766	
