= 1958 Ottawa municipal election =

The city of Ottawa, Canada held municipal elections on December 1, 1958.

Mayor George Nelms is re-elected with a comfortable margin.

== Mayor of Ottawa ==
Candidate	Votes	%
George Nelms (X)	28,346	55.92
William J. LeClair	13,572	26.77
Roy Donaldson	8,774	17.31

== Ottawa Board of Control ==
(4 elected)

Candidate	Votes	%
Paul Tardif (X)	33,394	
Ernie Jones (X)	30,407	
Sam Berger (X)	29,464	
Wilbert Hamilton (X)	28,785	
Michael Chomyn	13,024	
Joseph Louis Paradis	6,581	

== City council ==
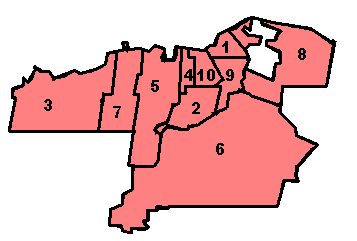
Map of Ottawa's Wards used in this election: 1. By Ward; 2. Capital Ward; 3. Carleton Ward; 4. Dalhousie Ward; 5. Elmdale-Victoria Ward; 6. Gloucester Ward; 7. Queensboro Ward; 8. Rideau Ward; 9. St. George's Ward; 10. Wellington Ward .

(2 elected from each ward)

Gloucester Ward
Candidate	Votes	%
Murray Heit	3,096	
Alex Roger (X)	2,912	
Pat Doherty	2,715	
Gordon Willis	2,508	

Rideau Ward
Candidate	Votes	%
J. D. Wentzell (X)	2,464	
Robert Groves (X)	2,335	
Leslie G. Avery	1,314	
J. G. Drouin	1,275	

Capital Ward
Candidate	Votes	%
Don Armstrong	2,543	
George Sloan (X)	2,055	
Claude Bennett	1,546	
Noel Ogilvie (X)	1,540	
Jack Kavanagh	1,366	
Bob Williamson	783	
Thomas Davison	564	

Carleton Ward
Candidate	Votes	%
Howard Henry (X)	3,965	
Lloyd Francis	3,700	
Frank Boyce	2,861	

Queensboro Ward
Candidate	Votes	%
Ken Workman	2,898	
Lon Campbell (X)	2,857	
Robert Faulkner	1,597	
Don Hamilton	1,206	
S. Crawford	1,021	

Dalhousie Ward
Candidate	Votes	%
James McAuley (X)	2,392	
Charles Parker (X)	2,021	
Perry Kerwin	1,180	
Rudy Capogreco	659	
G. F. Johnson	560	

Elmdale-Victoria Ward
Candidate	Votes	%
Roly Wall (X)	3,124	
Henry Bradley (X)	2,906	
Bruce Harvey	1,661	
Ferdinand Clement	756	

By Ward
Candidate	Votes	%
Jules Morin (X)	2,956	
Clem Aubin (X)	2,155	
Paul-Emile Morin	1,167	

St. George's Ward
Candidate	Votes	%
Charlie St. Germain (X)	3,526	
May Nickson (X)	1,981	
Sam McLean	1,005	
George Rayner	717	

Wellington Ward
Candidate	Votes	%
Don Reid (X)	2,669	
Lionel O'Connor (X)	1,851	
James Beauchamp	1,136	
W. T. Lewis	730	
