= John Powers (Canadian politician) =

Ottawa Alderman
- In office January 1, 1937 – October 11, 1951 Serving with Fred Goodhouse (1937–1939); Wilbert Spearman (1940–1942); Leslie Avery (1943–1952)
- Preceded by: Wilbert Spearman & Shirley S. Slinn
- Succeeded by: Alex Roger
- Constituency: Rideau Ward
- In office May 17, 1962 – December 31, 1969 Serving with Ellen Webber (1962), Des Bender (1963–1969)
- Preceded by: Jessen Wentzell
- Succeeded by: Tom McDougall

Ottawa Controller
- In office October 11, 1951 – December 31, 1954 Serving with Len Coulter (1951–1952); Daniel McCann; Paul Tardif; Roy Donaldson (1953–1954)
- Preceded by: Charlotte Whitton
- Succeeded by: George H. Nelms, Ernie Jones

Personal details
- Born: November 5, 1894 Ottawa, Ontario, Canada
- Died: January 23, 1977 (aged 82)
- Spouse: Myrtle Edythe Erskine (m. 1921)
- Children: 2

John J. Powers (November 5, 1894 – January 23, 1977) was a Canadian politician. He served on Ottawa's Board of Control from 1951 to 1954 and as an alderman on Ottawa City Council from 1937 to 1951 and from 1962 to 1969.

== Early life ==
Powers was the son of Mary Ann Currie, who died in 1897, and George Powers, an immigrant from Glasgow, Scotland, who owned a clothing store at 202 Sparks Street. He lived at 16 Rideau Terrace in New Edinburgh, and attended school at Crichton and Glashan Public Schools and high school at Lisgar Collegiate Institute.

He enlisted with the 8th Mounted Rifles, and later the 27th Battalion, Winnipeg Rifles, and served overseas for over four years, as a machine gunner in World War I. He was wounded in 1916 in St. Eloi, Belgium, when he "took a ride on a shell" which resulted in both legs being "riddled with shrapnel". He had to be hospitalized for 27 months, with doctors insisting on amputating his left leg. He refused, and returned to Canada with his left leg "twisted and torn". Despite this, he played ice hockey for New Edinburgh and the Munitions of the Ottawa City Hockey League upon his return. Prior to the War, he also played for Britannia in the Interprovincial Amateur Hockey Union.

Outside of politics, he was the secretary-treasurer of the Erskine Smith Company Ltd, for 40 years. It was one of the city's largest plumbing and heating companies. He was also a member of the Ottawa-New Edinburgh Canoe Club, where he canoed, played lacrosse, football, hockey and baseball.

== First stint as alderman (1937–1951) ==
Powers first ran for office in the 1936 municipal election, running in Rideau Ward. He ran on a platform for a new fire station in the ward. He also promised "honest administration", and believed in cash relief as done in England, and day labour to repair streets in the ward. On election day, he topped the poll by just one vote in the ward, receiving a total 625 votes.

For the 1937 council term, Powers sat on the city's Traffic Committee, and claimed a perfect attendance record, and getting a fire hall for the ward.

Powers ran for re-election in Rideau Ward in the 1937 election, placing first again, this time with 808 votes, over 100 votes more than his seat mate, Fred Goodhouse. He was re-elected in the 1938 election, topping the poll again, this time with over 1,000 votes. In 1939, Powers was appointed to the new special Civic Buildings Committee which was charged with preparing council on information about municipal buildings and a new city hall.

Powers was re-elected again in the 1939 municipal election, finishing first in Rideau Ward with 687 votes, seven more than his new seat mate, Wilbert Spearman. For the 1940 term, Powers again claimed he had attended every city council meeting that year.

Powers topped the polls again in the 1940 municipal election, winning 947 votes, 42 more than seat mate Spearman. The next term on council would be for two years. Beginning the 1941–42 term, Powers was elected as vice chairman of the Traffic Committee, and was re-elected as chairman in 1942.

Powers ran for re-election in 1942, with reducing the car fare to five-cents as one of his promises. On election day, he placed second in Rideau Ward with 875 votes, 54 votes behind poll-topper Leslie Avery. That was enough to easily elect him to the ward's second seat, as he won over 500 votes more than the third-place finisher. Beginning the 1943–44 term, Powers was named to the Central Canada Exhibition Association, to the playgrounds committee, and to the traffic committee. He was elected as chair of the Traffic Committee for 1943.

Powers and seat-mate Avery were re-elected in 1944 without opposition. Following the election, he was re-appointed chairman of the Civic Traffic Committee. He served as chair until January 1946, but remained on the committee for the remainder of the year. He also continued to serve on the Central Canada Exhibition Association, the playgrounds, the smoke nuisance, and parliamentary committees.

Powers and Avery were acclaimed to office in Rideau once again in 1946. In 1948, he was a Central Canada Exhibition director, and sat on the traffic committee, and the playgrounds committee.

Powers ran for re-election in 1948 on his record of moving for a "12-inch water main" in the ward, and a "storage tank for the booster pump to raise water pressure." He also promised to keep the tax rate as low as possible, but wouldn't try to reduce taxes, and supported gradual growth for the city. He also claimed that he had "attended very meeting of City Council" the previous year, was "a member of almost every committee", he would give the duties of aldermen the "fullest of attention", and that his "hobby" was to represent his constituents. On election day, he won 1,175 votes, 240 votes behind Avery, but elected to Rideau Ward's second seat. Following the election, he was named chairman of the city playgrounds committee.

Powers ran again in Rideau Ward in 1950, claiming to be "one of the busiest aldermen", and having attended "between 90 and 100 per cent of all meetings". He also touted the fact that 65 new lights were installed in the ward in the previous years, as poor lighting was one of the campaign issues in Rideau. On election day, Powers was re-elected with 1,239 votes, just five votes fewer than his seat-mate, Avery. Following the election, he was appointed to the Central Canada Exhibition Association again, along with the Industrial and Publicity Committee, while he resigned from the traffic committee.

== Board of Control (1951–1954) ==
On October 11, 1951, Powers was appointed to the city's Board of Control, following an election by members of city council, defeating fellow aldermen David McMillan, Eric Query, Wilbert Hamilton, F. M. Journeaux, and Charles Parker. Mayor Charlotte Whitton had charged that the election was illegal, as the assistant city clerk had acted as scrutineer. The seat had been vacated when Whitton was elevated to the mayoralty following the death of Grenville Goodwin earlier that year.

Following his promotion to the board, he assumed responsibility for many of the city's social service departments. He sat on the Civic Hospital Board, and the Board of Health, and would be involved with the Family Court and the Civic Housing Committee. In November 1951, he was the first chairman of a new committee set up to report on the integration of the Ottawa Recreation Commission and the Playgrounds Department.

Powers ran to retain his board seat in the 1952 municipal election. He believed his record as controller, and his background as an alderman warranted his election. He ran on protecting the pocketbooks of voters, the reorganization of the recreation department, that the mill rate on the Civic Hospital would be reduced, and the hospital's expansion would be "top on (his) priority list". He also indicated he was opposed to Sunday sports, and promised the members of his "large" family would vote against it in the referendum that was being held at the same time. He also called on the federal government to pay "its share" for the installation of services in new parts of the city. On election day, he was elected with 28,825 votes city-wide, placing fourth on the four-seat board, with just over 500 votes ahead of the fifth place candidate.

Following his election, Powers retained the social services (health, welfare, etc.) responsibilities, and was appointed to the Central Canada Exhibition Association, and was appointed to another term to the board of trustees for the Civic Hospital. As a member of the Board of Trustees, he disputed concerns by hospital staff that their pediatric and obstetrical departments had a lack of resources.

In 1954, Powers was named to the Advisor and Finance Committee of the Central Canada Exhibition Association, and as a financial advisor to the Ottawa Community Nurses' Registry. On November 22, 1954, Powers announced he was quitting municipal politics, and would not run for re-election to the Board of Control.

== Interregnum (1954–1962) ==
Despite being out of politics, Powers remained active in civic affairs. In December 1954, Powers was reappointed to the Civic Hospital Board of Trustees. In January 1955, he was appointed vice chairman of the Civic Hospital, and as the new director in the Merchants, Manufacturers and General Section of the Central Canada Exhibition Association. In May 1955, he was appointed a commissioner of affidavits by the lieutenant-governor of Ontario, Louis Breithaupt. In 1957, he was elected president of the Ottawa Shrine Club.

== Return as Alderman (1962–1969) ==
On May 17, 1962, Powers was elected by members of city council to fill the vacancy in Rideau Ward which was caused by the resignation of Jessen Wentzel. He defeated Cecil Duncan, who finished third in the ward in the 1960 election, former alderman Roland Wall, Lieut. Des Bender, and twice-failed Board of Control candidate Joseph Louis Paradis for the spot. Upon his election, he served on the superannuation committee, and stated his opposition to a new public housing project on Donald Street.

There were rumours Powers would run for his old Board of Control seat in the 1962 municipal election, however he chose to run for alderman in Rideau. In the campaign, he called for "better recreation facilities", and "better traffic control". He also opposed low-rent housing in the ward. On election day, he topped the poll in Rideau Ward with 3,807 votes, 599 ahead of his new seatmate, Des Bender. Following the election, Powers was appointed to the city's traffic committee, He was also re-elected as a Director of the Central Canada Exhibition Association, eventually becoming vice-chairman. Over the next term, he was also on the Tourist and Convention Committee.

Outside of politics, Powers got a new job in 1964, as a business administrator at H. G. Francis and Sons, Ltd, a plumbing and heating firm. He ran for re-election in Rideau Ward in that year's municipal election, on a platform of eliminating the city's short overdrafts which were "costing the taxpayer thousands of dollars annually". On election day, he was re-elected in second place with 3,339 votes, nearly 500 votes behind Bender, who placed first, but over 1,000 votes ahead of the third place candidate. Following the election, he was retained on the Traffic Committee, of which he became the chair, and was retained as a member of the Central Canada Exhibition Association. He also joined the tourist and convention committee.

Power ran for re-election in the 1966 municipal election for the city's first three-year term. Some of his planks for re-election were better police protection, as well as more traffic lights and crosswalks in his ward. On election day, he was re-elected with 2,544 votes, just under 150 fewer than Bender who placed first, and over 500 votes ahead of third place. Following the election, Powers joined the city's sign committee, and was made vice-chairman of the tourist and convention committee. In 1968, he was appointed chairman of the tourist and convention committee. In 1969, he was credited with being the "driving force" behind the reconstruction program that put city hall's two bird fountains in working order. In October 1969, Powers announced he was retiring from city council, effective at the end of the year. He cited his greatest achievement as "my small role in the development of Ottawa from a small, old-fashioned city to the threshold of new status as one of the most exciting capitals in the world".

Following his retirement, Powers was appointed to the board of directors of the Central Canada Exhibition Association in 1972. He died in 1977.

== Personal life ==
Powers was an elder at McKay Street United Church, and a member of the Shriners Lodge. He was married to Myrtle Erskine, a registered nurse, and they had two children, John Erskine Powers, who became an alderman in Prince George, British Columbia, and Barbara Mary Powers. His uncle, Johnny was a member of the Ottawa Capitals lacrosse team, and a member of the Ottawa Sports Hall of Fame.
