= 1956 Ottawa municipal election =

The city of Ottawa, Canada, held municipal elections on December 3, 1956.

Controller George Nelms is acclaimed as mayor, the last election in Ottawa's history where a candidate for mayor has run unopposed. Nelms was not the incumbent mayor. The incumbent was Charlotte Whitton who decided not to run again.

After four years of wards just having numbers, names were returned to each of the wards. The size of council also increased by one ward, with the split of Ward 1 into two wards.

== Mayor of Ottawa ==
Candidate	Votes	%
George Nelms	Acclaimed	

== Ottawa Board of Control ==
(4 elected)

Candidate	Votes	%
Paul Tardif (X)	30,157	
Ernie Jones (X)	26,480	
Wilbert Hamilton	24,167	
Sam Berger	24,004	
Roy Donaldson (X)	23,127	
Stewart Crawford	9,168	

== City council ==
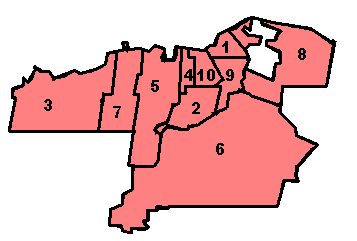
Map of Ottawa's Wards used in this election: 1. By Ward; 2. Capital Ward; 3. Carleton Ward; 4. Dalhousie Ward; 5. Elmdale-Victoria Ward; 6. Gloucester Ward; 7. Queensboro Ward; 8. Rideau Ward; 9. St. George's Ward; 10. Wellington Ward .

(2 elected from each ward)

Gloucester Ward
Candidate	Votes	%
Pat Doherty (X)	2,268	
Alex Roger	2,073	
Patrick Boyce	1,467	
Gordon Willis	113	

Rideau Ward
Candidate	Votes	%
Robert Groves (X)	2,372	
J. D. Wentzell	2,006	
Margaret Newman	1,166	
J. G. Drouin	1,118	
Reba Kingston	1,021	

Capital Ward
Candidate	Votes	%
George Sloan	3,700	
Noel Ogilvie (X)	3,486	
James A. Donaldson (X)	3,172	

Carleton Ward
Candidate	Votes	%
Howard Henry (X)	3,186	
Frank Boyce (X)	2,487	
Lloyd Francis	2,124	
G. C. Brown	831	

Queensboro Ward
Candidate	Votes	%
Lon Campbell (X)	3,451	
Richard Barber (X)	3,239	
P. H. Moore	1,816	

Dalhousie Ward
Candidate	Votes	%
James McAuley (X)	2,931	
Charles Parker	2,043	
Percy Kerwin	1,748	
John Barlow	1,100	

Elmdale-Victoria Ward
Candidate	Votes	%
Roly Wall (X)	3,193	
Henry Bradley (X)	3,133	
Henry Fauteux	2,329	

By Ward
Candidate	Votes	%
Jules Morin (X)	3,005	
Clem Aubin (X)	2,206	
Paul-Emile Morin	1,916	
M. Henri Rheaume	1,083	

St. George's Ward
Candidate	Votes	%
Charlie St. Germain (X)	3,280	
May Nickson (X)	1,763	
Sam McLean	1,383	
Cecile O'Regan	1,240	

Wellington Ward
Candidate	Votes	%
Don Reid (X)	2,775	
Lionel O'Connor	1,288	
H. G. Caldwell	904	
James Beauchamp	867	
Robert E. Robinson (X)	866	
Sam Chandler	839	
W. T. Lewis	339	
