= 1954 Ottawa municipal election =

The city of Ottawa, Canada held municipal elections on December 6, 1954.

== Mayor of Ottawa ==
Candidate	Votes	%
Charlotte Whitton (X)	33,078	47.73
David Luther Burgess	22,757	32.84
E. A. Bourque	13,469	19.43

== Ottawa Board of Control ==
(4 elected)

Candidate	Votes	%
George Nelms	38,762	
Paul Tardif (X)	35,403	
Roy Donaldson (X)	32,140	
Ernie Jones	32,140	
G. M. Geldert	26,757	
Alex Roger	25,094	
Stewart Crawford	9,849	

== Ottawa City Council ==
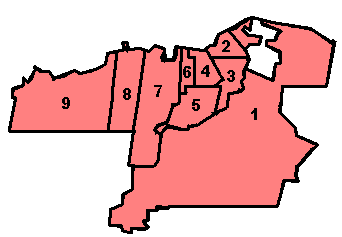
Map of Ottawa's Wards used in this election.

(2 elected from each ward)

Ward 1
Candidate	Votes	%
Robert Groves (X)	5,867	
Pat Doherty	5,026	
Patrick Boyce	4,678	

Ward 2
Candidate	Votes	%
Jules Morin (X)	3,490	
Clem Aubin (X)	3,068	
Henri Rheaume	2,449	

Ward 3
Candidate	Votes	%
Charlie St. Germain (X)	4,774	
May Nickson	2,116	
Sam McLean	1,685	
Arthur Moeser	840	
Don Kay	711	
Rene Paquin	535	

Ward 4
Candidate	Votes	%
Don Reid	4,131	
Martin M. Walsh (X)	3,388	
Fred Journeaux (X)	2,561	
H. Gibson Caldwell	1,530	
James Beauchamp	1,265	

Ward 5
Candidate	Votes	%
Noel Ogilvie (X)	5,575	
James A. Donaldson	5,280	
George Sloan (X)	5,257	

Ward 6
Candidate	Votes	%
Wilbert Hamilton (X)	4,021	
James McAuley (X)	4,001	
Charles Parker	2,587	
Percy Kerwin	1,271	
Gilbert Johnson	838	
Frederick Clermont	610	

Ward 7
Candidate	Votes	%
Roly Wall (X)	acclaimed	
Henry Bradley (X)	acclaimed	

Ward 8
Candidate	Votes	%
Lon Campbell (X)	4,795	
Richard Barber	3,467	
Patrick Moore	2,961	
Henry Parslow (X)	1,345	

Ward 9
Candidate	Votes	%
Howard Henry (X)	3,432	
Frank Boyce (X)	2,796	
Don Charboneau	2,671	
George C. Brown	1,236	
