= Clem Aubin =

Canadian politician

Ottawa Alderman Serving with Henri Rheaume (1947–1948; 1951–1952) Aristide Belanger (1949–1950) Jules Morin (1953–1962)
- In office 1947–1962
- Preceded by: Napoleon Bordeleau
- Succeeded by: Ralph Brunet
- Constituency: Ottawa Ward (1947-1952); By Ward (1952-1962)

Personal details
- Born: April 6, 1911 Ottawa
- Died: December 21, 1968 (aged 57) Ottawa
- Party: Liberal
- Spouse: Cécile Ranger (m. 1934)
- Children: 2
- Profession: Grocer, civil servant

Joseph Clément Aubin (April 6, 1911 - December 21, 1968) was a Canadian politician. He served as an alderman on Ottawa City Council from 1947 to 1962. On council, he fought for bilingual signage and the improvement of local parks.

== Early life ==
Aubin was the son of Clorinda (née Dupont) and Victor Aubin. He was a fourth generation resident of Ottawa's Lowertown neighbourhood, with his ancestors settling there in the 1850s.

Aubin owned a grocery store on Dalhousie Street from about 1940, until he sold it in 1960. The store, which included a chuck wagon, faced Metcalfe Square Park, at the corner of Sussex Drive. The whole area was demolished in the 1960s to make way for the Macdonald-Cartier Bridge.

In 1940, he was elected president of the East Ottawa Young Liberals. He had been a member of the local riding association since the early 1930s. He was also a member of the Saint-Jean-Baptiste Society, the French-Canadian Institute, the Knights of Columbus, and the French Chamber of Commerce.

A well known local athlete, he once tried out for the Montreal Canadiens of the National Hockey League. He played goaltender for Montagnards and La Salle in the Ottawa City Hockey League. In 1944, he was named manager of the local Canadiens team in that league. In 1946, he coached the St. Jean Baptiste softball team to an Ottawa and district championship.

== Aldermanic career ==
=== 1946–1952 ===
On November 6, 1946, Aubin filed papers to run for a seat on Ottawa City Council in the 1946 municipal election, running in Ottawa Ward. Aubin topped the poll in the election, winning 1,675 votes. Following his election, he was named vice-chairman of the civic parks and trees committee. He was also a member of the Firemen's Superannuation, the Tree Committee, and the Smoke Committee.

Aubin ran for re-election in the 1948 municipal election. He ran on his record of playground projects in the Ste. Anne area (Lowertown East), and on Green Island, and said that "he would be going all out to win friends (on) council".

In October 1950, his grocery and snack bar on Dalhousie Street suffered "considerable damage" by smoke and fire.

Aubin was re-elected in the 1950 municipal election, topping the poll in Ottawa Ward with 1,895 votes, more than 400 votes ahead of the third place candidate in the two-seat ward. At the beginning of the 1951–52 term, Aubin was appointed as one of the city's representatives to the Children's Aid Society.

=== 1952–1960 ===
When Ottawa's city council was reduced in size for the 1952 municipal election, Aubin announced in mid-November that he was running in the new Ward 2, which covered his former Ottawa Ward, neighbouring By Ward and part of St. George's Ward. In the election, he topped the poll in the two-seat ward, winning 2,642 votes, fewer than 400 more than the third place candidate.

In January 1953, Aubin helped an off-duty officer to capture a 32 year old labourer who was suspected of indecent assault on one of Aubin's grocery store employees.

Aubin endorsed E. A. Bourque's unsuccessful candidacy for mayor of Ottawa in the 1954 mayoral election. Aubin ran for re-election in the same election, this time finishing second in Ward 2. As a result, Aubin was elected to the ward's second seat, over 600 votes ahead of the third place candidate, Henri Rheaume. For the 1955–56 council, Aubin sat on the city's traffic, transportation, and tree committees, and in 1956 he sat on the city's special housing committee. He was also appointed to the new Noise Abatement Committee for 1956. As a member of the city's traffic committee, he called on the implementation of bilingual traffic signs in Lowertown, where there were many French-speaking residents.

In 1955, following rumours that Ottawa East MP Jean-Thomas Richard would be appointed to the Senate, Aubin was seen as a possible candidate for the Liberals to replace him.

Aubin ran for re-election in the 1956 municipal elections in the newly named By Ward. He placed second again, winning 2,206 votes, 290 votes ahead of the third place candidate, Paul Emile Morin, thus getting elected to the ward's second seat. At the beginning of 1958, Aubin was appointed to the revived Smoke Abatement Committee to deal with the increase of black smog emanating from the city's chimneys. He was also a member of the Civic Traffic Committee from the 1957–58 term.

Aubin ran for re-election again in the 1958 municipal elections, promising that all traffic signs in the ward would be bilingual within a year, and that King Edward Avenue would become a "beautiful boulevard". On election day, he placed second once again, winning 2,155 votes, nearly 1,000 more than the third place candidate, Paul-Emile Morin. As a result, Aubin was re-elected to the two-seat ward. Following his election, he was named as a member of the city's air pollution committee. For 1960, he was also a member of the housing Committee, and traffic committee.

=== 1960–1962 ===
In 1960, he became the owner of Latourelle Lodge on Long Lake in Blue Sea, Quebec. He also sold his grocery, and went to work in the stationary branch of the House of Commons.

Aubin was re-elected in the 1960 municipal election, winning 2,425 votes, getting the second seat. He won nearly 500 votes more than the third place candidate, Lucien Vincent. Following his election, he was appointed to the city's traffic and air pollution control committees. He was also named to the board of directors of the Central Canada Exhibition Association.

On November 6, 1962, Aubin announced his intention to run for re-election in the 1962 municipal election. On election day, Aubin lost his seat to Ralph Brunet, his brother-in-law. He won 2,236 votes, over 700 behind Brunet who won the second seat. Aubin blamed his loss on "[b]etter organization" by Brunet. It was the first electoral loss for Aubin, who ended his term as the second longest sitting member on council, behind his seatmate Jules Morin. Following his loss, he announced his retirement from municipal politics.

== Post defeat ==
When Aubin's old seatmate Jules Morin was appointed to the city's Board of Control in 1963, Aubin was considered by council as a possible replacement to take Morin's seat. He won the endorsement of the French Canadian Chamber of Commerce in his bid. When it came a to a council a vote, he lost to former alderman Cecile O'Regan on the first ballot.

In mid-November 1964, Aubin announced he would be running to get his old seat back in the 1964 municipal election. In the election, he came out in favour of Sunday sport, which was one of the referendum questions put up to voters, stating "I'd rather see a father take his sons to a baseball game than to a beach where they might see topless bathing suits". He also ran on a new coliseum, and a skating arena for the ward. He claimed that the ward's councillors 'hardly did anything' in the previous term. On election day, Aubin won 1,920 votes, nearly 2,000 votes behind Ralph Brunet, who was re-elected to the ward's second seat.

There were rumours he would run in the 1966 election in Rideau Ward, but he ultimately did not do so.

He died in 1968, and was interred at Notre Dame Cemetery.
