= 1930 Ottawa municipal election =

Canadian municipal election

The city of Ottawa, Canada held municipal elections on December 1, 1930.

== Mayor of Ottawa ==
Controller John J. Allen was elected as mayor without opposition, after mayor Frank H. Plant decided to retire after running as a Conservative in the 1930 Canadian federal election.

Candidate	Votes	%
John J. Allen	Acclaimed	

== Ottawa Board of Control ==
All three incumbent controllers were defeated as voters opted to elect a new slate of controllers. Notably, no French Canadians were elected to the Board of Control, and it was thought that this was the first election to have all four elected controllers be Protestants.

(4 elected)

Candidate	Votes	%
G. M. Geldert	16,459	19.04
James Warren York	14,121	16.34
J. E. Stanley Lewis	13,483	15.60
George H. Dunbar	12,353	14.29
Gerald Sims (X)	10,972	12.69
Frank LaFortune (X)	7,729	8.94
Charles J. Tulley (X)	6,991	8.09
Joseph Albert Pinard	4,327	5.01

== Ottawa City Council ==
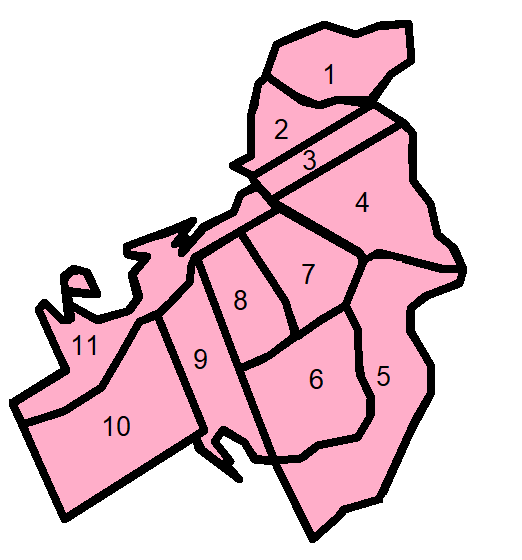
Map of Ottawa's Wards used in this election: 1. Rideau Ward; 2. Ottawa Ward; 3. By Ward; 4. St. George's Ward; 5. Riverdale Ward; 6. Capital Ward; 7. Central Ward; 8. Wellington Ward; 9. Dalhousie Ward; 10. Elmdale Ward; 11. Victoria Ward

While voters kicked out the incumbent members of the board of control, they opted to maintain their local incumbent alderman. Only one incumbent councillor (Nelson J. Lacasse) went down in defeat.

(2 elected from each ward)

Rideau Ward
Candidate	Votes	%
Rod Plant (X)	882	42.71
Thomas Brethour (X)	851	41.21
Robert Hood	332	16.08

By Ward
Candidate	Votes	%
Fred Desjardins (X)	1,240	35.40
Eric Query (X)	1,170	33.40
Joseph Albert Parisien	1,093	31.20

St. George's Ward
Candidate	Votes	%
Norman H. MacDonald (X)	1,513	28.89
Fulgence Charpentier (X)	1,383	26.40
P. J. O'Connor	1,352	25.81
J. B. Lachaine	686	13.10
Max Feller	304	5.80

Wellington Ward
Candidate	Votes	%
James W. McNabb (X)	1,986	33.93
J. Edward McVeigh (X)	1,537	26.26
Edwin A. Beach	1,353	23.11
G. E. Faith	978	16.71

Capital Ward
Candidate	Votes	%
Edward A. Band (X)	2,397	36.90
Harold D. Marshall	1,716	26.42
N. E. Swerdfager	1,340	20.63
T. E. McLaughlin	1,043	16.06

Dalhousie Ward
Candidate	Votes	%
Daniel McCann (X)	1,993	35.58
E. P. McGrath	1,326	23.67
W. A. Balharrie	1,062	18.96
James J. McVeigh	811	14.48
Jack Arron	410	7.32

Elmdale Ward
Candidate	Votes	%
Sam Crooks (X)	1,332	29.85
Jim Forward (X)	896	20.08
William H. Marsden	861	19.29
H. H. Bradley	736	16.49
W. C. Graham	638	14.30

Victoria Ward
Candidate	Votes	%
John Robert Welch	1,143	29.18
Ernest Laroche (X)	1,019	26.01
Nelson Joseph Lacasse (X)	961	24.53
John Patrick Nolan	794	20.27

Ottawa Ward
Candidate	Votes	%
Aristide Belanger (X)	1,565	36.03
Wilfrid St. Aubin (X)	1,342	30.90
Joseph Landriault	746	17.18
Aurelien Rose	492	11.33
Ferrier C. Morin	103	2.37
Francois X. Gamanche	95	2.19

Riverdale Ward
Candidate	Votes	%
George S. Sloan (X)	1,788	39.23
George Pushman (X)	1,621	35.56
David McMillan	1,149	25.21

Central Ward
Candidate	Votes	%
Kirby Bangs	1,775	35.45
William R. Low (X)	1,695	33.85
Harold C. Shipman	1,537	30.70
