= 1952 Ottawa municipal election =

Election in Ontario, Canada

The city of Ottawa, Canada held municipal elections on December 1, 1952.

== Mayor of Ottawa ==
Candidate	Votes	%
Charlotte Whitton (X)	37,373	52.73
Len Coulter	33,498	47.27

== Referendum ==
Sunday Sports
Candidate	Votes	%
No	40,670	58.27
Yes	29,122	41.73

== Ottawa Board of Control ==
(4 elected)

Candidate	Votes	%
Dan McCann (X)	38,982	
Paul Tardif (X)	37,373	
Roy Donaldson	32,295	
John Powers (X)	28,825	
David McMillan	28,306	
Ernie Jones	22,188	
Frank Ellis	15,634	

== Ottawa City Council ==
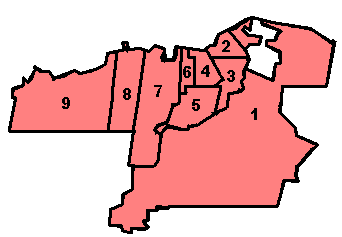
Map of Ottawa's Wards used in this election.

(2 elected from each ward)

Ward 1
Candidate	Votes	%
Robert Groves	3,699	
Alex Roger (X)	3,384	
Pat Doherty (X)	3,251	
Archibald Newman (X)	1,948	
Leslie Avery (X)	1,857	
Thomas Hubert	289	

Ward 2
Candidate	Votes	%
Clem Aubin (X)	2,642	
Jules Morin (X)	2,575	
Henri Rheaume (X)	2,274	
Eric Query (X)	2,116	
Aristide Belanger	1,338	

Ward 3
Candidate	Votes	%
Charlie St. Germain (X)	5,327	
William Newton (X)	3,610	
Sam McLean	2,640	

Ward 4
Candidate	Votes	%
Martin M. Walsh (X)	4,074	
Fred Journeaux (X)	3,259	
Cyril Marshall (X)	2,818	
H. Gibson Caldwell	2,104	
John Barlow	1,976	

Ward 5
Candidate	Votes	%
Noel Ogilvie (X)	4,723	
George Sloan (X)	4,116	
Parlane Christie (X)	3,228	
Thomas Davison	3,061	
William Beveridge	2,805	

Ward 6
Candidate	Votes	%
Wilbert Hamilton (X)	4,770	
James McAuley (X)	4,655	
Charles Parker (X)	4,289	
Frederick Clermont	1,058	

Ward 7
Candidate	Votes	%
Henry Bradley (X)	4,360	
Roly Wall (X)	3,904	
Lee Rickey	2,504	
Joseph Allard (X)	2,440	
Victor Chartier	346	

Ward 8
Candidate	Votes	%
Lon Campbell (X)	4,708	
Henry Parslow (X)	3,774	
Patrick Moore	2,382	

Ward 9
Candidate	Votes	%
Howard Henry (X)	Acclaimed	
Frank Boyce (X)	Acclaimed	
