= Riverdale Ward =

Municipal ward in Ottawa, Canada

Riverdale Ward was a municipal ward in the city of Ottawa, Canada. It was created in 1929, when it split off from Capital Ward. The ward consisted of that part of Ottawa between Bronson Avenue and what is now Nicholas Street, between the Rideau River and the Rideau Canal. In 1931 the population was 10,125. This area consists of the present day neighbourhoods of Old Ottawa East and Old Ottawa South.

The Ottawa South part of this Ward became part of Ward 5 in 1952, while the Ottawa East part was annexed by Ward 3.

== Aldermen ==
Council	Aldermen	
1930	George Sloan	George Pushman
1931	George Sloan	George Pushman
1932	George Sloan	George Pushman
1933	George Sloan	George Pushman
1934	George Sloan	David McMillan
1935	George Sloan	David McMillan
1936	George Sloan	David McMillan
1937	George Sloan	David McMillan
1938	George Sloan	David McMillan
1939	George Sloan	David McMillan
1940	Len Coulter	David McMillan
1941–42	Len Coulter	David McMillan
1942–44	Len Coulter	David McMillan
1945–46	Len Coulter	David McMillan
1947–48	Len Coulter	David McMillan
1949–50	Victor Irish	David McMillan
1951–52	George Sloan	David McMillan
