= South March =

Settlement in Ottawa, Ontario, Canada

Coordinates: 45.356°N 75.932°W

Location of South March in Kanata, Ontario near Ottawa, Ontario

South March is a dispersed rural community in Kanata North Ward, in Ottawa, Ontario, Canada. The older community has been permeated by the newer Morgan's Grant subdivision, which has largely replaced it.
