= Elmdale Ward =

Municipal ward in Ottawa, Ontario

Elmdale Ward was a municipal ward in the city of Ottawa, Ontario, Canada.

The ward was created in 1929 when it was split off from Dalhousie Ward. It existed until 1994, when it was merged with Queensboro Ward to become Kitchissippi Ward.

In 1952, the ward was merged with Victoria Ward and named Ward 7. It was given the name Elmdale-Victoria Ward in 1956, and was known this until 1980.

Elmdale Ward originally consisted of Ottawa's western suburbs, such as Civic Hospital and Hintonburg, but was later shifted west by an expanding Dalhousie Ward to its east. As Ottawa expanded, Elmdale's western boundary became Island Park Drive.

== Aldermen ==
| Council | Aldermen | |
|---|---|---|
| 1930 | Samuel Crooks | Jim Forward |
| 1931 | Samuel Crooks | Jim Forward |
| 1932 | William H. Marsden | Jim Forward |
| 1933 | William H. Marsden | Jim Forward |
| 1934 | William H. Marsden | Jim Forward |
| 1935 | William H. Marsden | Jim Forward |
| 1936 | William H. Marsden | Jim Forward |
| 1937 | William H. Marsden | Jim Forward |
| 1938 | George W. Pingle | Jim Forward |
| 1939 | George W. Pingle | Henry Bradley |
| 1940 | David Sprague | Henry Bradley |
| 1941-42 | George W. Pingle | Henry Bradley |
| 1942-44 | George W. Pingle | Henry Bradley |
| 1945-46 | George W. Pingle | Henry Bradley |
| 1947-48 | George W. Pingle | Henry Bradley |
| 1949-50 | Roly Wall | Henry Bradley |
| 1951-52 | Roly Wall | Henry Bradley |
| 1953-54 | Roly Wall | Henry Bradley |
| 1955-56 | Roly Wall | Henry Bradley |
| 1957-58 | Roly Wall | Henry Bradley |
| 1959-60 | Roly Wall | Henry Bradley |
| 1961-62 | Roly Wall | Bruce Harvey |
| 1963-64 | Roly Wall | Bruce Harvey |
| 1965-66 | Roly Wall | Bruce Harvey |
| 1967-69 | Roly Wall | Bruce Harvey |
| 1970-72 | Roly Wall | Walter Ryan |
| 1973-74 | Walter Ryan | |
| 1975-76 | Pat Nicol | |
| 1977-78 | Roly Wall | |
| 1979-80 | Chris Chilton | |
| 1981-82 | Graham Bird | |
| 1983-85 | Graham Bird | |
| 1986-88 | Jamie Fisher | |
| 1989-91 | Jamie Fisher | |
| 1992-94 | Jill Brown | |
