= George H. Nelms =

Canadian politician

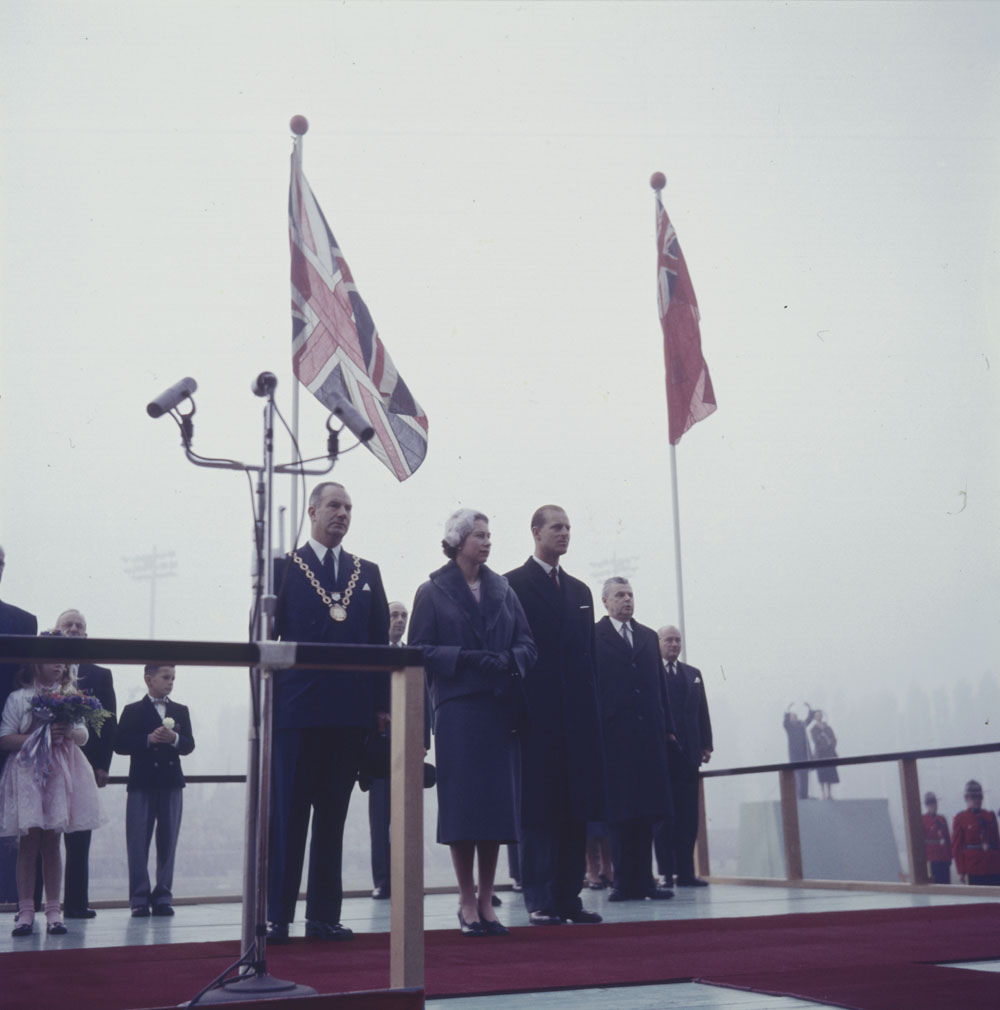
- Nelms (left) with Queen Elizabeth II and Prince Philip in 1957.

47th Mayor of Ottawa
- In office 1957–1960
- Preceded by: Charlotte Whitton
- Succeeded by: Charlotte Whitton

Ottawa Controller
- In office 1955–1956
- Preceded by: John Powers
- Succeeded by: Wilbert Hamilton & Sam Berger

Personal details
- Born: 1905 Thame, Oxfordshire, England
- Died: September 17, 1999 (aged 93–94) Ottawa

George H. Nelms (1905 – September 17, 1999) was mayor of Ottawa from 1957 to 1960. He was an optician by profession. Nelms was born in Thame, Oxfordshire, England in 1905 and came to Canada in 1912. He had two sons, Larry and John and two daughters, Linda and Jane.

During his term as Mayor, he would welcome Queen Elizabeth and her husband the Duke of Edinburgh to the city in 1957, a visit which included a ceremony to commence construction of the Queensway superhighway project. On June 24, 1957, Nelms opened Laurentian High School. In 1958, Nelms saw the opening of a new city hall facility on Green Island. He was also chair of the Ottawa Transportation Commission under whose watch electric streetcar transit service was replaced with buses.

Nelms died in Ottawa at Grace Hospital aged 94.
