= Sam Berger (lawyer) =

Canadian football businessman (1900–1992)

- Born: January 1, 1900; Ottawa, Ontario, Canada
- Died: July 24, 1992 (aged 92); Ottawa, Ontario, Canada
- Relatives: Julius Berger (brother)
- Football career

Profile
- Positions: Owner, president

Career history
- 1930–1968: Ottawa Rough Riders
- 1969–1981: Montreal Alouettes
- Canadian Football Hall of Fame (Class of 1993)

Samuel Berger, CM FRSC QC (January 1, 1900 – July 24, 1992) was a Canadian owner of the Canadian Football League's Ottawa Rough Riders and Montreal Alouettes and president of the CFL.

== Life ==
A lawyer by profession, he was an early football fan who became involved with the Ottawa Rough Riders team as its legal advisor, president, and as an owner. He served three, three-year terms as the club's president during which time the team made it to the Grey Cup seven times, winning the championship on four occasions.

He loved football, and played for Ottawa Collegiate Institute’s team. After high school, he worked as a reporter for the Ottawa Citizen, Ottawa Journal and Toronto Star. In 1925 he started at Osgoode Hall Law School and two years later started his own law firm in Ottawa.

Active in the Ottawa community, Berger twice ran for mayor of the city, losing to Charlotte Whitton in the 1960 and 1962 elections.

== CFL ==
=== Ottawa Rough Riders ===
Highlights of his Rough Rider career include:

- 1930 hired by the Rough Riders as legal adviser.
- late 1930s founded real estate company, Ottawa Commercial Realties Ltd. when he was the Rough Riders’ vice-president. Without Sam Berger, the Grey Cup might have remained tucked away for years in the basement of an east Ottawa apartment; discovered it stored in a locker underneath The Strathcona apartments on Laurier Avenue East, a building he owned and lived in at the time.
- 1940 became Rough Riders’ president.
- Second World War service as an RCAF officer in London.
- 1955 He and several colleagues bought Rough Riders.

=== Montreal Alouettes ===
In 1969 Sam Berger sold his shares in the Ottawa club and donated the proceeds to charitable causes. He then purchased the troubled Montreal Alouettes franchise and in the ensuing twelve years built it into a powerhouse that made six Grey Cup appearances and won it three times.

He retired in 1976, as the active owner of Alouettes, handing over the presidency to his eldest son, David. On March 6, 1981, Berger sold the Alouettes to Vancouver businessman Nelson Skalbania.

=== CFL Administration ===
He was President of the Canadian Football League in 1964 and 1971 and as an attorney and owner played a key role in putting together the League's first television contract.

== Honours ==
In 1986, Sam Berger was made a Member of the Order of Canada, one of Canada's highest civilian honours, for "his commitments to the sport and to the City of Montreal". In 1993, he was inducted into the Canadian Football Hall of Fame.
