= Charlotte Whitton =

Canadian politician (1896–1975)

Charlotte Elizabeth Whitton OC CBE
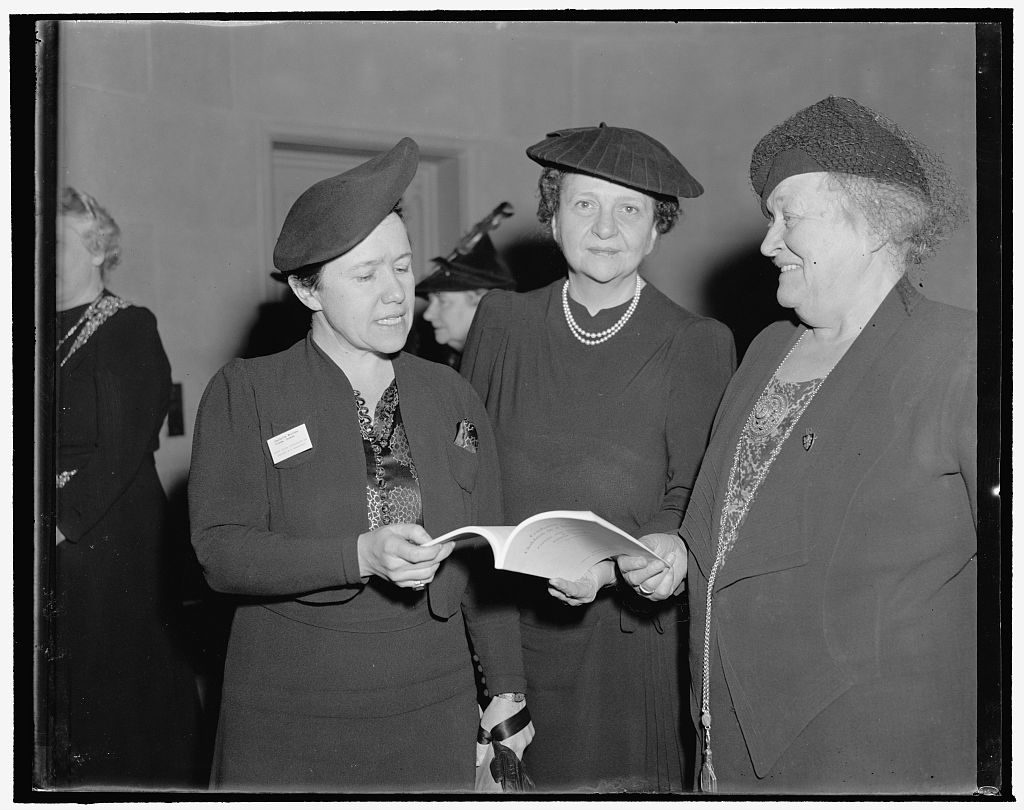
- Charlotte Whitton, Frances Perkins, US Secretary of Labour, and Betzy Kjelsberg, Norwegian women's rights activist, 1939 or 1940

46th Mayor of Ottawa
- In office 1951–1956
- Preceded by: Grenville Goodwin
- Succeeded by: George H. Nelms
- In office 1961–1964
- Preceded by: George H. Nelms
- Succeeded by: Donald Bartlett Reid

Ottawa Controller
- In office January 1, 1951 – October 1, 1951
- Preceded by: C. E. Pickering
- Succeeded by: John Powers

Ottawa Alderwoman
- In office 1967–1972
- Preceded by: Claude Bennett
- Succeeded by: Gary Guzzo
- Constituency: Capital Ward

Personal details
- Born: March 8, 1896 Renfrew, Ontario
- Died: January 25, 1975 (aged 78)
- Resting place: Thompson Hill Cemetery, Horton, Ontario
- Party: Progressive Conservative
- Domestic partner: Margaret Grier (1915–1947)

Charlotte Elizabeth Whitton OC CBE (March 8, 1896 – January 25, 1975) was a Canadian feminist and mayor of Ottawa. She was the first woman mayor of a major city in Canada, serving from 1951 to 1956 and again from 1960 to 1964. Whitton was a Canadian social policy pioneer, leader and commentator, as well as a journalist and writer.

== Early life and education ==
Charlotte Elizabeth Hazeltyne Whitton was born in Renfrew, Ontario, a small Ottawa Valley town about 100 km northwest of Ottawa.

She attended Queen's University where she was the star of the women's hockey team and was known as the fastest skater in the league. In 1917, the year she earned a Master of Arts degree, she became the first female editor of the Queen's Journal newspaper.

== Career and accomplishments ==
Upon graduating from Queen's, she became a civil servant as the private secretary for Thomas Low, MP and Minister of Trade in Liberal Prime Minister William Lyon Mackenzie King's first government.

When Low lost his parliamentary seat, Whitton then focused on her role as founding director (1922) of the Canadian Council on Child Welfare, and worked there until 1941. It became the Canadian Welfare Council, now the Canadian Council on Social Development, and helped bring about a wide array of new legislation to help children and immigrants.

In 1934, Whitton was named a Commander of the Order of the British Empire at the 1934 New Year Honours.

She served on the League of Nations Social Questions Committee.

Whitton was awarded an honorary Doctorate of Laws by Queen's in 1941.

She published two books in 1943.

Despite her strong views on women's equality, Whitton was a strong social conservative, and did not support making divorce easier. She was a regular columnist in Ottawa's daily newspapers.

== Political career ==
Whitton was elected to Ottawa's Board of Control in 1950, leading the city-wide polls, and started her term on January 1, 1951.

Upon the unexpected death of mayor Grenville Goodwin in August of the same year, only some eight months into his term, Whitton was immediately appointed acting mayor, and on 30 September 1951 was confirmed by city council to remain mayor until the end of the normal three-year term.

Whitton is sometimes mistakenly credited as the first woman ever to serve as a mayor in Canada, but this distinction is in fact held by Barbara Hanley, who became mayor of the small Northern Ontario town of Webbwood in 1936. Whitton is the first woman to serve as mayor of a large Canadian city.

Whitton was elected Ottawa mayor in the general municipal election in her own right in 1952, serving until 1956. She turned it into a full-time job.

She ran again for mayor of Ottawa in 1960, and was elected, serving until 1964, when she was defeated on her try for re-election.

=== Opposes new flag ===
Whitton was a staunch defender of Canada's traditions, and, as Ottawa mayor, condemned Prime Minister Lester B. Pearson's proposal in 1964 for new national flag to replace the traditional Canadian Red Ensign. Whitton dismissed Pearson's design as a 'white badge of surrender, waving three dying maple leaves' which might as well be 'three white feathers on a red background,' a symbol of cowardice. 'It is a poor observance of our first century as a nation if we run up a flag of surrender with three dying maple leaves on it,' she said. For Whitton, the Red Ensign, with its Union Jack and coat of arms containing symbols of England, Scotland, Ireland and France (or a similar flag with traditional symbols on it) would be a stronger embodiment of the Canadian achievement in peace and war.

She became well known for her assertiveness, and for her vicious wit with which many male colleagues, and once the Lord Mayor of London, were attacked. She is noted for the quotation: "Whatever women do they must do twice as well as men to be thought half as good. Luckily, this is not difficult."

On October 23, 1955, while mayor, Whitton appeared on the Sunday evening American game show What's My Line.

In the 1958 federal election, Whitton made her only attempt to run for Parliament, in the riding of Ottawa West, as the Progressive Conservative nominee. Prime Minister John Diefenbaker and Ontario Premier Leslie Frost campaigned for her. However, she lost to Liberal Party incumbent George McIlraith by 1,425 votes. McIlraith held the riding from 1940 to 1968, and Whitton's challenge was the closest he faced during that period.

Whitton was made an Officer of the Order of Canada in 1967.

She ran for the position of city alderwoman (councillor) in 1967, and was elected, serving until 1972.

== Accusations of racism ==
Whitton had many remarkable achievements, but her story is framed by current controversy over some of her actions.

She has been accused in print of espousing, "a 'scientific' racism that viewed groups such as Jews and Armenians as 'undesirable' immigrants." (Open Your Hearts: The Story of the Jewish War Orphans in Canada by Fraidie Martz)

In 1938, she attended a conference in Ottawa to launch the Canadian National Committee on Refugees (CNCR). She showed opposition to some of the other attendees' arguments. A common belief is that she was directly opposed to Jews and in particular Jewish children. Oscar Cohen of the Canadian Jewish Congress is reported to have said she "almost broke up the inaugural meeting of the congress on refugees by her insistent opposition and very apparent anti-Semitism." This sentiment is countered by the official record, which includes notes from her presentation, including "lobby the government to initiate a long-term refugee program ..." and an interest in protecting all at risk, "particularly Hebrews in the Reich and in Italy."

According to the Canadian Jewish Congress: "Certainly in the course of the Second World War and the Holocaust, she was instrumental in keeping Jewish orphans out of Canada because of her belief that Jews would not make good immigrants and were basically inferior."

As Mayor in 1964, she declined Bertram Loeb's $500,000 donation to the city's Ottawa Civic Hospital. The official rationale was that the city could not afford to keep the centre operating. The sentiment exists that she "simply didn't want the name of a Jewish family on an Ottawa hospital building.".

According to Patricia Rooke (co-author of a 1987 biography of Whitton), Whitton was a "complete anglophile" who opposed all non-British immigration to Canada. "Charlotte Whitton was a racist," according to Rooke. "Her anti-Semitism, I think, was the least of it. She was quite racist about the Ukrainians, for example. She really didn't like the changing character of Canadian society."

In opposition to the anti-Semite argument, Whitton was well received by various Jewish organizations in her lifetime, including B'nai B'rith and various Jewish-centred publications. She was also a supporter of—and the first to sign the nomination papers of—the first Jewish Mayor of Ottawa, Lorry Greenberg, who served as Ottawa mayor from 1975 to 1978.

In 2011 Whitton's name was kept off a new Archives Building in Ottawa due to this controversy.

== Personal life ==
Whitton never married, but lived for years in a Boston marriage living arrangement with Margaret Grier (1892 – December 9, 1947). Her relationship with Grier was not widespread public knowledge until 1999, 24 years after Whitton's death, when the National Archives of Canada publicly released the last of her personal papers, including many intimate personal letters between Whitton and Grier. The release of these papers sparked much debate in the Canadian media about whether the relationship between Whitton and Grier could be characterized as lesbian, or merely as an emotionally intimate friendship between two unmarried women, with the debate hinging in part on the question of whether or not it was necessary to prove that Whitton and Grier had ever had sexual intercourse with each other.

However, Whitton never publicly identified as lesbian during her political career, and Grier died before Whitton was elected as mayor, so Whitton could not be credited as Canada's first out LGBT mayor regardless of the nature of her relationship with Grier.

Grier died in 1947 and she is buried at Thompson Hill Cemetery, Thompson Hill, Horton, Ontario, Canada. In 1975 Whitton was buried alongside her.

== Portrayals ==
Whitton's relationship with Grier was dramatized in a 2008 play called Molly's Veil written by Canadian playwright and actor Sharon Bajer. Bajer was inspired to write the play after reading letters written between Whitton and Grier, and used these as the basis for the play. The play explores Whitton's relationship with her partner Grier, portraying Whitton as a loving partner in a lesbian relationship and deals with the tension between Whitton's private life and her public one.

== Major works ==
- "The Dawn Of Ampler Life", 1943.
- "A Hundred Years A-Fellin'", 1943. (1842–1942, A History of Logging by the Gillies Family and Others, in the Ottawa Valley)

== Legacy ==
The Ontario Heritage Trust erected a plaque for Charlotte Elizabeth Whitton, O.C., C.B.E. 1896–1975 in the council chambers, Ottawa City Hall, 111 Sussex Drive, Ottawa. "A controversial fighter for social reform, Charlotte Whitton served on the Canadian Council on Child Welfare (later the Canadian Welfare Council) and on the League of Nations Social Questions Committee. In 1951, she was elected mayor of Ottawa."

Two biographies of Whitton were published in 1987 and 2010 (see below). Author David Mullington's 2010 work Charlotte: The Last Suffragette won the 2011 Donald Grant Creighton Award for biography from the Ontario Historical Society.

== See also ==
- No Bleeding Heart: Charlotte Whitton: A Feminist on the Right, by P.T. Rooke and R.L. Schnell, 1987, UBC Press, Vancouver, ISBN 978-0774802376.
- Charlotte: The Last Suffragette, by David Mullington, 2010, General Store Publishing House, ISBN 978-189-7508770.
