= Grenville Goodwin =

Canadian politician

45th Mayor of Ottawa
- In office 1 January 1951 – 27 August 1951
- Preceded by: E.A. Bourque
- Succeeded by: Charlotte Whitton

Personal details
- Born: 1898
- Died: 27 August 1951 (aged 53) Ottawa

Grenville W. "Gren" Goodwin (1898 – 27 August 1951) was a Canadian optometrist who was Mayor of Ottawa in 1951.

== Life ==
Goodwin's hometown was Prescott, Ontario. He moved to Ottawa in 1911. He served in France during World War I, where he was injured. Upon returning to Canada, he attended the University of Toronto and graduated from the Royal College of Science, Toronto. He also attended the American College of Optics in Detroit.

Goodwin defeated incumbent mayor E.A. Bourque in December 1950 by approximately 10,000 votes. But Goodwin's term in office was cut short at age 53. He had an unexpected heart failure and died shortly afterwards at the Ottawa Civic Hospital. Charlotte Whitton was immediately appointed the city's next mayor.
