= J. E. Stanley Lewis =

Canadian politician

43rd Mayor of Ottawa
- In office 1936–1948
- Preceded by: Patrick Nolan
- Succeeded by: E.A. Bourque

Personal details
- Born: February 29, 1888
- Died: August 18, 1970 (aged 82) Ottawa, Ontario
- Party: Liberal

John Edward Stanley Lewis (February 29, 1888 – August 18, 1970) was Ottawa's second longest-serving mayor, holding that position from 1936 to 1948.

He was born in Ottawa in 1888 to Edward and Isabella Lewis. He owned and operated an electrical store in the city. He was first elected to City Council as an alderman in 1930. It was during Lewis' term as mayor, in early September 1946, that 25 veterans of World War II and their families took over the abandoned Kildare Barracks at 323 Chapel St. to protest the lack of housing.

When Barbara Ann Scott won the World Figure Skating Championships in 1947, she was presented with a car by Lewis on her triumphant return; however, she was not able to accept the gift from the city because she wished to retain amateur status.
