= By Ward =

By Ward was one of the five original wards represented on Ottawa City Council, created in 1855 out of parts of East Ward and Centre Ward which existed in Bytown. Originally it represented the area between Rideau Street (excluding the lots on Rideau) and St. Patrick Street. Today this area is part of the By Ward Market, which is named for the historic ward.

In 1952, the ward annexed Ottawa Ward to its north, encompassing the neighbourhood of Lower Town as well.

The ward existed until 1972, when it merged with St. George's Ward to form By-St. George's Ward. This gave the Ward the Sandy Hill neighbourhood.

In 1980, the area formerly known as By Ward split from St. George's and joined with Rideau Ward to become By-Rideau Ward. This ward existed until 1994 in which the By portion of the ward joined back with St. George's and became Bruyère-Strathcona Ward, which today is part of Rideau-Vanier Ward.

The ward was named for Colonel John By.

== Councillors (1953–1972) ==
Council	Aldermen	
1953–54	Jules Morin (until May 22, 1963)	Clem Aubin
1955–56	Jules Morin (until May 22, 1963)	Clem Aubin
1957–58	Jules Morin (until May 22, 1963)	Clem Aubin
1959–60	Jules Morin (until May 22, 1963)	Clem Aubin
1961–62	Jules Morin (until May 22, 1963)	Clem Aubin
1963–64	Jules Morin (until May 22, 1963)	Ralph Brunet
1963–64	Cecile O'Regan (from June 3, 1963)	Ralph Brunet
1965–66	Jules Morin	Ralph Brunet
1967–69	Jules Morin	Ralph Brunet
1970–72	Jules Morin	Ralph Brunet
