= Ottawa Ward =

Ottawa Ward is a former ward in Ottawa, Canada. It was one of the original wards of the city, created in 1855 from parts of Centre Ward and East Ward in Bytown. It was abolished in 1952, when it was overtaken by By Ward.

Ottawa Ward for its entire existence, was located in the area of Ottawa north of St. Patrick Street, between the Rideau River and the Ottawa River. This area is the oldest part of the city, and for much of its existence, was home to the lower class of Ottawa, mainly French and Irish Catholics. This area is better known by its neighbourhood name, Lower Town.
