= E. A. Bourque =

Canadian politician

44th Mayor of Ottawa
- In office 1949–1950
- Preceded by: J.E. Stanley Lewis
- Succeeded by: Grenville Goodwin

Personal details
- Born: July 26, 1886 Ottawa
- Died: May 2, 1962 Ottawa
- Spouse: Evelyn Martin (m. 1919)
- Children: 8

Edouard Adeceus "Eddy" Bourque (July 26, 1886 – May 2, 1962) was Mayor of Ottawa in 1949 and 1950.

Bourque was born in Ottawa's Lower Town on St. Patrick Street, the son of Francis Bourque and Rachel Langevin. He was a longtime city councilor and member of the city's Board of Control from 1937 to 1949, and owner of the Twin City Ice and Coal Company, later to become E.A. Bourque Ltd.

As the city comptroller, he squired the purchase of the Ottawa Electric Railway, that became Ottawa Transportation Commission. In 1949 he became the first French-speaking mayor of Ottawa in 50 years. As mayor, at the request of Prime Minister Mackenzie King, he worked closely with urban planner Jacques Gréber to oversee the annexation of thousands of acres of Nepean and Gloucester, laying the groundwork for the Greenbelt, Gatineau Park and the National Capital Region. An avid outdoors-man and conservationist, Eddy was a prominent member of the Gatineau Fish and Game Club, which still bears a boat house in his name.

His brother Romuald was a mayor of Outremont and a member of the Canadian House of Commons and of the Senate of Canada. His father, Frank Bourque, was from Douglas, Ontario, and was a conductor for Ottawa Electric Railway, his mother Rachel Langevin from Fort Coulonge, Quebec His children, Marie, Édouard, Raymond, Paul, Gerard, Suzanne, Pierre and Bernard survived him. Édouard, Pierre and Bernard became prominent real estate developers.

Pierre purchased Ciment Lafarge quarry in Hull in 1982, developed it as Boulevard de la Carriere, built Louis St-Laurent Building, which was occupied by the Department of National Defence.

He sold part of the land to Casiloc, the operating arm for Quebec Casinos, and the Casino du Lac Leamy was built.

His grandson Pierre Bourque was appointed a city of Ottawa alderman and regional councillor but lost the first election after his appointment. Another grandson, Michael, is president of the Canadian Real Estate Association and former president of the Canadian Railway Association.

When he died, he was living in Rothwell Heights, in Gloucester, Ontario.
