= Paul Tardif =

Canadian politician

- Official 1966 portrait

Member of the Canadian Parliament for Russell
- In office October 5, 1959 – June 24, 1968
- Preceded by: Joseph-Omer Gour
- Succeeded by: District abolished

Personal details
- Born: February 18, 1908 Ottawa, Ontario, Canada
- Died: August 3, 1998 (aged 90)
- Party: Liberal

J. Paul Tardif (February 18, 1908 – August 3, 1998) was an Ontario businessman and political figure. He represented Russell in the House of Commons of Canada as a Liberal from 1959 to 1968.

He was born in Ottawa in 1908, the son of A.-T. Tardif and Marie Côté. In 1933, Tardif married Cecile-H. Quesnel. Tardif served as school commissioner, a member of Ottawa city council, city controller and deputy mayor. He was first elected to parliament in a 1959 by-election held after the death of Joseph-Omer Gour. After his term in office, Tardif served ten years as a citizenship court judge.

== Electoral record ==
By-election: On Mr. Gour's death, 5 October 1959
Party	Candidate	Votes
Liberal	Paul Tardif	21,070
Progressive Conservative	Wilbur Nixon	14,152
Co-operative Commonwealth	Denis Kalman	1,077

1962 Canadian federal election: Russell
Party	Candidate	Votes
Liberal	Paul Tardif	29,322
Progressive Conservative	Leo Kelly	15,492
New Democratic	Harold B. Wilson	3,385
Social Credit	Adrien Papineau	1,427

1963 Canadian federal election: Russell
Party	Candidate	Votes
Liberal	Paul Tardif	31,182
Progressive Conservative	Joe Poirier	14,892
New Democratic	Harold B. Wilson	3,191
Social Credit	Léo Cote	2,938

1965 Canadian federal election: Russell
Party	Candidate	Votes
Liberal	Paul Tardif	28,997
Progressive Conservative	Kenneth Binks	15,718
New Democratic	Harold B. Wilson	7,186
