= Municipal elections in Ottawa =

This is a list of elections held in Ottawa, Ontario. Direct elections for mayor have been held continuously since 1873.

== City of Ottawa mayoral election results since 1887 ==
=== 1887 ===
1. McLeod Stewart, 2,169
2. W. E. Brown, 1,790

=== 1888 ===
1. McLeod Stewart, 1,957
2. W. E. Brown, 1,643
3. W. H. Lewis, 360

=== 1889 ===
1. Jacob Erratt, 2,823
2. Dr. Valade, 2,345

=== 1890 ===
1. Jacob Erratt, 2,620
2. W. H. Lewis, 1,419

=== 1891 ===
1. Thomas Birkett, 2,396
2. Dr. St. Jean, 1,459
3. John Heney, 1,095
4. Alex MacLean, 385

=== 1892 ===
1. Olivier Durocher, 2,280
2. George Cox, 2,199

=== 1893 ===
1. Olivier Durocher, acclaimed

=== 1894 ===
1. George Cox, 2,289
2. C. R. Cunningham, 1,663
3. William R. Stroud, 1,549

=== 1895 ===
1. William Borthwick, 3,277
2. William Cluff, 3,188

=== 1896 ===
1. William Borthwick, acclaimed

=== 1897 ===
1. Samuel Bingham, 2,712
2. Levi Crannell, 2,558
3. William Cluff, 1,869

=== 1898 ===
1. Samuel Bingham, acclaimed

=== 1899 ===
1. Thomas Payment, 3,067
2. Robert Stewart, 2,424
3. William Cluff, 2,301

=== 1900 ===
1. Thomas Payment, 3,626
2. William Campbell, 3,240

=== 1901 ===
1. William Dowler Morris, 3,436
2. Fred Cook, 1,590
3. Thomas Raphael, 1,534
4. Thomas Butler, 266
5. Samuel J. Davis, 194
6. William Campbell, 175

=== 1902 ===
1. Fred Cook, acclaimed

=== 1903 ===
1. Fred Cook, acclaimed

=== 1904 ===
1. James A. Ellis, 3,992
2. D'Arcy Scott, 3,333
3. J. C. Enright, 777

=== 1905 ===
1. James A. Ellis, 4,623
2. William Dowler Morris, 4,146

=== 1906 ===
1. James A. Ellis, 4,773
2. A. A. Taillon, 4,523
3. William G. Black, 59

=== 1907 ===
1. D'Arcy Scott, 3,988
2. Charles Hopewell, 3,800
3. William Dowler Morris, 1,570
4. William G. Black, 171

=== 1908 ===
1. D'Arcy Scott, acclaimed

=== 1909 ===
1. Charles Hopewell, acclaimed

=== 1910 ===
1. Charles Hopewell, acclaimed

=== 1911 ===
1. Charles Hopewell, 4,968
2. A. E. Caron, 4,411
3. Roberts, 331

=== 1912 ===
1. Charles Hopewell, 4,146
2. E. J. Laverdure, 3,892
3. P. D. Ross, 3,323

=== 1913 ===
1. James A. Ellis, 5,816
2. E. J. Laverdure, 5,038
3. George Wilson, 1,572

=== 1914 ===
1. Taylor McVeity, 7,184
2. James A. Ellis, 6,883

=== 1915 ===
1. Nelson D. Porter, 7,539
2. Taylor McVeity, 7,124

=== 1916 ===
1. Nelson D. Porter, acclaimed

=== 1917 ===
1. Harold Fisher, 6,122
2. Nelson D. Porter, 4,392
3. Taylor McVeity, 2,391

=== 1918 ===
1. Harold Fisher, acclaimed

=== 1919 ===
1. Harold Fisher 7,624
2. Rufus H. Parent 4,642

=== 1920 ===
1. Harold Fisher 7,962
2. G. C. Hurdman 5,608

=== 1921 ===
1. Frank H. Plant 7,826
2. Joseph Kent 7,804

(results after recount)

=== 1922 ===
1. Frank H. Plant 10,923
2. Joseph Kent 4,698
3. W. K. McManus 241

=== 1923 ===
1. Frank H. Plant, acclaimed

=== 1924 (January) ===
1. Henry Watters 14,641
2. Frank H. Plant 9,969
3. Taylor McVeity 736

=== 1924 (December) ===
1. John P. Balharrie 15,159
2. Arthur Ellis 8,405
3. W. E. Brown 1,546

=== 1925 ===
1. John P. Balharrie, acclaimed

=== 1926 ===
1. John P. Balharrie 12,336
2. Patrick Nolan 6,354
3. Frank H. Plant 6,273

=== 1927 ===
1. Arthur Ellis 11,183
2. John P. Balharrie 8,415
3. Patrick Nolan 7,805

=== 1928 ===
1. Arthur Ellis, acclaimed

=== 1929 ===
1. Frank H. Plant, acclaimed

=== 1930 ===
1. John J. Allen, acclaimed

=== 1931 ===
1. John J. Allen, acclaimed

=== 1932 ===
1. John J. Allen 16,295
2. Andrew F. Macallum 8,894
3. Charles J. Tulley 6,541

=== 1933 ===
1. Patrick Nolan 19,634
2. John J. Allen 13,577
3. Peter Alex Cray 387
4. Dudley Booth 356

=== 1934 ===
1. Patrick Nolan 27,064
2. Albert H. Cole 2,394
3. William P. Clermont 1,380
4. James Connah 327
5. Edward E. Kesteron 266

=== 1935 ===
1. J. E. Stanley Lewis 17,810
2. Fulgence Charpentier 9,755
3. Patrick Nolan 6,414
4. Edward H. Hinchey 2,164

=== 1936 ===
1. J. E. Stanley Lewis 22,065
2. Albert H. Cole 3,025
3. William Watson 1,008

=== 1937 ===
1. J. E. Stanley Lewis 18,186
2. William H. Marsden 12,255
3. Caleb Green 324
4. William Watson 284

=== 1938 ===
1. J. E. Stanley Lewis 17,958
2. William H. Marsden 11,457
3. George H. Dunbar 6,788
4. Caleb Green 201
5. William Watson 133

=== 1939 ===
1. J. E. Stanley Lewis 15,685
2. Finley McRae 11,941
3. S. Leonard Belaire 5,260

=== 1940 ===
1. J. E. Stanley Lewis 19,729
2. S. Leonard Belaire 11,692

=== 1942 ===
1. J. E. Stanley Lewis 18,279
2. S. Leonard Belaire 7,496
3. C. E. Pickering 5,408
4. Lorenzo Lafleur 3,584

=== 1944 ===
1. J. E. Stanley Lewis 17,814
2. C. E. Pickering 7,602
3. V. Cyril Phelan 5,997

=== 1946 ===
1. J. E. Stanley Lewis 22,650
2. Sydney T. Checkland 3,160

=== 1948 ===
1. E. A. Bourque 16,150
2. Grenville Goodwin 15,229
3. G. M. Geldert 14,547

=== 1950 ===
1. Grenville Goodwin 28,698
2. E. A. Bourque 18,668
3. G. M. Geldert 12,928

=== 1952 ===
1. Charlotte Whitton 37,373
2. Len Coulter 33,498

=== 1954 ===
1. Charlotte Whitton 33,078
2. David Luther Burgess 22,757
3. E. A. Bourque 13,469

=== 1956 ===
1. George H. Nelms acclaimed

=== 1958 ===
1. George H. Nelms 28,346
2. William J. LeClair 13,572
3. Roy Donaldson 8,774

=== 1960 ===
1. Charlotte Whitton 35,532
2. Sam Berger 33,825
3. Ernie W. Jones 9,317
4. Lucien A. Dube 2,675

=== 1962 ===
1. Charlotte Whitton 40,062
2. Sam Berger 34,044
3. R.J. Groves 18,245

=== 1964 ===
1. Don B. Reid 43,991
2. Frank Ryan 26,996
3. Charlotte Whitton 25,608
4. Joseph Louis Paradis 706
5. Alfred Lapointe 395

=== 1966 ===
1. Don B. Reid 59,082
2. Donald V. Sterling 15,445
3. John Kroeker 2,273
4. Lucien A. Dube 947
5. Alfred Lapointe (withdrew)

=== 1969 ===
1. Ken H. Fogarty 57,890
2. John Kroeker 5,182
3. Joseph Louis Paradis 3,781
4. David E. Porter 2,304
5. Lucien A. Dube 2,083

=== 1972 ===
1. Pierre Benoit 57,634
2. Alphonse Frederick Lapointe 2,520
3. Oscar Orenstein 2,095
4. Jack Ridout 1,602

=== 1974 ===
1. Lorry Greenberg 36,035
2. Tom McDougall 31,358
3. Stuart Langford 3,030
4. Alphonse Frederick Lapointe 1,642

=== 1976 ===
1. Lorry Greenberg 49,788
2. Alphonse Frederick Lapointe 3,482
3. Bill Foster 3,172
4. Mike Sammon 2,556

=== 1978 ===
1. Marion Dewar 51,791
2. Pat Nicol 32,033
3. Bernard Pelot 8,439
4. Alphonse Frederick Lapointe 1,858
5. Eddie Turgeon 730
6. Ian Orenstein 597

=== 1980 ===
1. Marion Dewar 49,687
2. Pat Nicol 33,151
3. Alphonse Frederick Lapointe 2,357
4. John Turmel 1,928

=== 1982 ===
1. Marion Dewar 57,168
2. Darrel Kent 48,461
3. T. Joseph McCarthy 2,060
4. Marc Gauvin 1,725
5. Arnold Guetta 487

=== 1985 ===
1. Jim Durrell 56,988
2. Marlene Catterall 35,711
3. R. Allan Jones 942
4. Walter J. McPhee 886
5. Nabil Fawzry 529

=== 1988 ===
1. Jim Durrell 69,813
2. Michael Bartholomew 4,800
3. John Turmel 3,123
4. John Kroeker 1,704
5. Nabil Fawzry 1,022

=== 1991 ===
1. Jacquelin Holzman 38,725
2. Nancy Smith 35,525
3. Marc Laviolette 21,101
4. Michael Bartholomew 2,417

=== 1994 ===
1. Jacquelin Holzman 34,082
2. Joan O'Neill 28,748
3. Tim Kehoe 24,773
4. Diane McIntyre 2,921
5. Alexander Saikaley 1,677

=== 1997 ===
1. Jim Watson 54,148
2. Robert G. Gauthier 8,037
3. Alexander Saikaley 4,209

=== 2000 ===
1. Bob Chiarelli 142,972
2. Claudette Cain 102,940
3. Georges Saadé 2,597
4. Marc-André Bélair 1,846
5. James A. Hall 843
6. Ken Mills 773
7. Paula Nemchin 702
8. John Turmel 677
9. Morteza Naini 516

=== 2003 ===
1. Bob Chiarelli 104,595
2. Terry Kilrea 66,634
3. Ike Awgu 5,394
4. Ron Burke 2,698
5. John A. Bell 2,027
6. Donna Upson 1,312
7. Paula Nemchin 1,191
8. John Turmel 1,166

=== 2006 ===
1. Larry O'Brien 141,262
2. Alex Munter 108,572
3. Bob Chiarelli 46,697
4. Jane Scharf 1,467
5. Piotr Anweiler 762
6. Robert Larter 667
7. Barkley Pollock 432

=== 2010 ===
Mayoral Candidate	Vote	%
Jim Watson	131,258	48.70
Larry O'Brien (X)	64,853	24.06
Clive Doucet	40,147	14.89
Andrew S. Haydon	18,904	7.01
Mike Maguire	6,617	2.45
Robert Gauthier	1,413	0.52
Jane Scharf	1,169	0.43
Charlie Taylor	1,125	0.42
Cesar Bello	926	0.34
Idris Ben-Tahir	729	0.27
Samuel Wright	371	0.14
Robin Lawrance	300	0.11
Joseph Furtenbacher	299	0.11
Sean Ryan	360	0.13
Julio Pita	265	0.10
Robert Larter	219	0.08
Michael St. Arnaud	200	0.07
Daniel J. Lyrette	166	0.06
Vincent M. Libweshya	122	0.05
Fraser Liscumb	104	0.04

=== 2014 ===
Mayoral candidate	Vote	%
Jim Watson (X)	189,253	76.20
Mike Maguire	46,341	18.66
Anwar Syed	3,473	1.40
Rebecca Pyrah	2,840	1.14
Robert White	1,815	0.73
Darren W. Wood	1,764	0.71
Michael St. Arnaud	1,628	0.66
Bernard Couchman	1,255	0.51

=== 2018 ===
Mayoral candidate	Vote	%
Jim Watson (X)	188,960	71.03
Clive Doucet	59,156	22.24
Bruce McConville	4,360	1.64
Craig MacAulay	2,272	0.85
Ahmed Bouragba	1,912	0.72
Joey Drouin	1,893	0.71
Hamid Alakozai	1,867	0.70
James T. Sheahan	1,354	0.51
Michael Pastien	1,177	0.44
Ryan Lythall	1,115	0.42
Moises Schachtler	994	0.37
Bernard Couchman	964	0.36

=== 2022 ===
2022 Ottawa municipal election: Mayor
Candidate	Popular vote			Expenditures
Candidate	Votes	%	±%	Expenditures
Mark Sutcliffe	161,679	51.37	–	$537,834.79
Catherine McKenney	119,241	37.88	–	$542,847.97
Bob Chiarelli	15,998	5.08	–	$96,844.84
Nour Kadri	7,496	2.38	–	$71,062.45
Mike Maguire	2,775	0.88	–	$5,500.00
Graham MacDonald	1,629	0.52	–	$5,334.50
Brandon Bay	1,512	0.48	–	$9,478.02
Param Singh	1,176	0.37	–	$13,650.40
Celine Debassige	867	0.28	–	none listed
Ade Olumide	636	0.20	–	$1,966.25
Gregory Jreg Guevara	584	0.19	–	$2,349.61
Bernard Couchman	471	0.15	-0.21	none listed
Jacob Solomon	432	0.14	–	none listed
Zed Chebib	264	0.08	–	none listed
Total valid votes	314,760	99.53		
Total rejected, unmarked and declined votes	1,500	0.47	-0.92	
Turnout	316,260	43.79	+1.24	
Eligible voters	722,227			
Note: Candidate campaign colours are based on the prominent colour used in campaign items (signs, literature, etc.) and are used as a visual differentiation between candidates.
Sources: City of Ottawa

=== 2026 ===
2026 Ottawa municipal election: Mayor
Candidate	Popular vote			Expenditures
Candidate	Votes	%	±%	Expenditures
Mark Sutcliffe (X)	139,354	44.65	-6.75	
Jeff Leiper	105,819	33.90	–	
Neil Saravanamuttoo	34,463	11.04	–	
Alex Lawson	23,605	7.56	–	
Amjad Ali Syed	1,312	0.42	–	
Queen Divine Priya Amber Bakshi	1,234	0.40	–	
Ali Shayvard	1,016	0.33	–	
Bernard Couchman	925	0.30	+0.15	
Peter Westaway	912	0.29	–	
Jacob Solomon	858	0.27	–	
Geoff Nicholas	799	0.26	–	
Suraj Harish	728	0.23	–	
Josh Rachlis	688	0.22	–	
Zed Chebib	412	0.13	+0.05	
Total valid votes	314,393			
Total rejected, unmarked and declined votes				
Turnout				
Eligible voters	868,248			
Note: Candidate campaign colours are based on the prominent colour used in campaign items (signs, literature, etc.) and are used as a visual differentiation between candidates.
Sources: City of Ottawa
