= Ottawa Board of Control =

Municipal body in Ontario, Canada (1908–1980)

The Ottawa Board of Control was an important part of the governance of Ottawa, Ontario from 1908 until 1980 when it was abolished. Through the 19th century Ottawa had been governed by a mayor and city council, but most councillors were only part-time and could spend only a few hours per week on municipal issues.

The board was elected across the entire city of Ottawa with the four candidates receiving the most votes being added to the board. The member of the board of control who received the most votes was also made deputy mayor, and was the legal successor to the mayor should they resign or die in office. The board of control was abolished in 1980 by the Ontario Municipal Board after a council vote for its abolition.

== History ==
Mayor Arthur Ellis found this problematic as there was little time for real scrutiny of important issues. He thus proposed creating a five member board of control consisting of the mayor and four members elected at large from across the city. At the same time the number of councillors would be reduced by a third.

The city council rejected this plan, as it would reduce both their authority and their numbers. In the 1908 municipal election the question was brought to a referendum, and was approved and the new board was created. In 1910 city council held a second referendum on whether the board should be abolished, and the people of Ottawa overwhelmingly voted in favour of keeping the board.

== Controllers ==
| Council | Controllers | | | |
|---|---|---|---|---|
| 1908 | Napoléon Champagne (until Nov. 12) | James Davidson (until Oct. 7, 1911) | Robert A. Hastey | Charles Hopewell |
| 1908 | Edward P. McGrath (from Nov. 18) | James Davidson (until Oct. 7, 1911) | Robert A. Hastey | Charles Hopewell |
| 1909 | Napoléon Champagne | James Davidson (until Oct. 7, 1911) | Robert A. Hastey | George H. Wilson |
| 1910 | Napoléon Champagne | James Davidson (until Oct. 7, 1911) | Robert A. Hastey | Edward H. Hinchey |
| 1911 | Napoléon Champagne | James Davidson (until Oct. 7, 1911) | Robert A. Hastey | Edward H. Hinchey |
| 1911 | Napoléon Champagne | W. E. Brown (from Nov. 6, 1911) | Robert A. Hastey | Edward H. Hinchey |
| 1912 | Stewart McClenaghan | Rufus H. Parent | Robert A. Hastey | Edward H. Hinchey |
| 1913 | Joseph Kent | Rufus H. Parent | John W. Nelson | Edward H. Hinchey |
| 1914 | Joseph Kent | Rufus H. Parent | John W. Nelson | E. R. McNeill |
| 1915 | Harold Fisher | James A. Ellis | John W. Nelson | Napoléon Champagne |
| 1916 | Harold Fisher | Joseph Kent | John W. Nelson | Napoléon Champagne |
| 1917 | Edward H. Hinchey | Joseph Kent | John W. Nelson | Napoléon Champagne |
| 1918 | James Muir | Joseph Kent | Ainslie W. Greene | Napoléon Champagne |
| 1919 | Frank H. Plant | Joseph Kent | John W. Nelson (until Dec. 1) | Napoléon Champagne |
| 1919 | Frank H. Plant | Joseph Kent | Walter Cunningham (from Dec. 1) | Napoléon Champagne |
| 1920 | Frank H. Plant | Joseph Kent | John Cameron | Napoléon Champagne |
| 1921 | Arthur Ellis | John P. Balharrie | John Cameron | Napoléon Champagne |
| 1922 | Arthur Ellis | John P. Balharrie | John Cameron | Napoléon Champagne |
| 1923 | Arthur Ellis | John P. Balharrie | John Cameron | Joseph McGuire |
| 1924 | Arthur Ellis | John P. Balharrie | Napoléon Champagne | Charles J. Tulley |
| 1925 | Herbert McElroy | Frank H. Plant | Napoléon Champagne | Charles J. Tulley |
| 1926 | Herbert McElroy | Frank H. Plant | Arthur Ellis | Charles J. Tulley |
| 1927 | Herbert McElroy | Frank LaFortune | Arthur Ellis | Charles J. Tulley |
| 1928 | Herbert McElroy | Frank LaFortune | Frank H. Plant | Charles J. Tulley |
| 1929 | Gerald Sims | Frank LaFortune | Frank H. Plant | Charles J. Tulley |
| 1930 | Gerald Sims | Frank LaFortune | John J. Allen | Charles J. Tulley |
| 1931 | George Mackinley Geldert | James Warren York | J. E. Stanley Lewis | George Harrison Dunbar |
| 1932 | George Mackinley Geldert | Fulgence Charpentier | Daniel McCann | George Harrison Dunbar |
| 1933 | George Mackinley Geldert | Fulgence Charpentier | J. E. Stanley Lewis | George Harrison Dunbar |
| 1934 | George Mackinley Geldert | Fulgence Charpentier | J. E. Stanley Lewis | Tom Brethour |
| 1935 | George Mackinley Geldert | Fulgence Charpentier | J. E. Stanley Lewis | J. Edward McVeigh |
| 1936 | George Mackinley Geldert | George Harrison Dunbar | Allan B. Turner | J. Edward McVeigh |
| 1937 | George Mackinley Geldert | George Harrison Dunbar | Allan B. Turner | E. A. Bourque |
| 1938 | George Mackinley Geldert | J. Edward McVeigh | Finley McRae | E. A. Bourque |
| 1939 | George Mackinley Geldert | John Harold Putnam | Finley McRae | E. A. Bourque |
| 1940 | George Mackinley Geldert | John Harold Putnam | Jim Forward | E. A. Bourque |
| 1941–42 | George Mackinley Geldert | Chester E. Pickering | Jim Forward | E. A. Bourque |
| 1943–44 | George Mackinley Geldert | Finley McRae | Grenville Goodwin | E. A. Bourque |
| 1945–46 | George Mackinley Geldert | Finley McRae | Grenville Goodwin | E. A. Bourque |
| 1947–48 | George Mackinley Geldert | Finley McRae | Grenville Goodwin | E. A. Bourque |
| 1949–50 | Len Coulter | Daniel McCann (until Sept. 8, 1954) | Paul Tardif | Chester E. Pickering |
| 1951–52 | Len Coulter | Daniel McCann (until Sept. 8, 1954) | Paul Tardif | Charlotte Whitton (until Oct. 1, 1951) |
| 1951–52 | Len Coulter | Daniel McCann (until Sept. 8, 1954) | Paul Tardif | John Powers (from Oct. 11, 1951) |
| 1953–54 | Roy Donaldson | Daniel McCann (until Sept. 8, 1954) | Paul Tardif | John Powers (from Oct. 11, 1951) |
| 1955–56 | Roy Donaldson | George H. Nelms | Paul Tardif | Ernie Jones |
| 1957–58 | Wilbert Hamilton | Sam Berger | Paul Tardif | Ernie Jones |
| 1959–60 | Wilbert Hamilton | Sam Berger | Paul Tardif | Ernie Jones |
| 1961–62 | Wilbert Hamilton | Lloyd Francis (until May 20, 1963) | Paul Tardif | Don B. Reid |
| 1963–64 | Ellen Webber | Lloyd Francis (until May 20, 1963) | Ernie Jones | Don B. Reid |
| 1963–64 | Ellen Webber | Jules Morin (from May 22, 1963) | Ernie Jones | Don B. Reid |
| 1965–66 | Ellen Webber | Kenneth Fogarty | Ernie Jones | Murray Heit |
| 1967–69 | Ellen Webber | Kenneth Fogarty | Ernie Jones | Murray Heit |
| 1970–72 | Claude Bennett (until Aug. 28, 1972) | Pierre Benoit (until Apr. 24, 1972) | Ernie Jones | Lorry Greenberg |
| 1970–72 | Tom McDougall (from Sept. 5, 1972) | Garry Guzzo (from May 1972) | Ernie Jones | Lorry Greenberg |
| 1973–74 | Tom McDougall (from Sept. 5, 1972) | Garry Guzzo (from May 1972) | Ernie Jones | Lorry Greenberg |
| 1975–76 | Marion Dewar | Garry Guzzo (from May 1972) | Don B. Reid | Bill Law |
| 1977–78 | Marion Dewar | Pat Nicol | Don B. Reid | Ralph Sutherland |
| 1978–80 | Brian Bourns | Bill Law | Don B. Reid | Ralph Sutherland |
