= 1932 Ottawa municipal election =

Canadian municipal election

The city of Ottawa, Canada held municipal elections on December 5, 1932.

== Mayor of Ottawa ==
Candidate	Votes	%
John J. Allen (X)	16,295	51.36
Andrew F. Macallum	8,894	28.03
Charles J. Tulley	6,541	20.61

== Ottawa Board of Control ==
(4 elected)

Candidate	Votes	%
Fulgence Charpentier (X)	16,093	17.38
G. M. Geldert (X)	14,839	16.02
George H. Dunbar (X)	14,620	15.79
J. E. Stanley Lewis	13,019	14.06
Daniel McCann (X)	12,107	13.07
Thomas Brethour	11,482	12.40
William R. Low	8,473	9.15
Joseph McHugh	1,969	2.13

== Ottawa City Council ==
(2 elected from each ward)

Rideau Ward
Candidate	Votes	%
Rod Plant (X)	898	
Charles E. Reid (X)	818	
Patrick Green	537	

By Ward
Candidate	Votes	%
A. W. Desjardins (X)	1,446	
Raoul Mercier	1,191	
Joseph Albert Parisien (X)	1,154	
Michel Baudet	255	

St. George's Ward
Candidate	Votes	%
Arthur Pinard	1,693	
Norman H. MacDonald (X)	1,674	
Walter Cunningham	1,412	
Rodolphe Girard	852	

Wellington Ward
Candidate	Votes	%
James W. McNabb (X)	2,246	
J. Edward McVeigh (X)	1,728	
Martin M. Walsh	1,541	

Capital Ward
Candidate	Votes	%
Edward Band (X)	2,664	
Harold D. Marshall (X)	2,195	
P. J. Nolan	1,711	
Albert E. Muir	285	

Dalhousie Ward
Candidate	Votes	%
E. P. McGrath (X)	1,942	
Wilbert Hamilton (X)	1,692	
James J. McVeigh	1,279	
Alfred Eales	1,128	

Elmdale Ward
Candidate	Votes	%
William H. Marsden (X)	1,430	
Jim Forward (X)	1,183	
R. O. Morris	815	
Henry Bradley	729	
James Reynolds	466	
Harry Low	409	

Victoria Ward
Candidate	Votes	%
John R. Welch (X)	1,490	
Nelson J. Lacasse (X)	1,210	
Ernest Laroche	1,070	
William Sutherland	533	

Ottawa Ward
Candidate	Votes	%
Aristide Belanger (X)	1,495	
Napoleon Bordeleau	1,177	
J. Albert Pinard	1,043	
W. J. St. Aubin (X)	840	
Elie R. Beauchamp	207	

Riverdale Ward
Candidate	Votes	%
George Pushman (X)	Acclaimed	
George Sloan (X)	Acclaimed	

Central Ward
Candidate	Votes	%
Kirby Bangs (X)	2,127	
Harold C. Shipman	1,760	
Eric Hind	1,355	
