= January 1924 Ottawa municipal election =

Election in Ottawa, Canada in 1924

The city of Ottawa, Canada held municipal elections on January 7, 1924, to elect members of the 1924 Ottawa City Council. It was the first of two municipal elections held in the 1924 calendar year, as the 1925 council was elected in December 1924.

== Mayor of Ottawa ==
Candidate	Votes	%
Henry Watters	14,641	57.76
Frank H. Plant	9,969	39.33
Taylor McVeity	736	2.90

== Plebiscite ==
There was a vote on the bylaw to sanction the agreement with the Ottawa Electric Railway Company. The bylaw would do away with ticket fares, replacing them with a straight five cent fare. It also means the company can begin construction on the Laurier Avenue, Bank to Elgin line and the Ottawa East line.

O.E.R. Bylaw Vote
Option	Votes	%
For	15,404	67.01
Against	7,583	32.99

== Ottawa Board of Control ==
(4 elected)

Candidate	Votes	%
Napoléon Champagne	9,479	13.07
Arthur Ellis	8,931	12.31
John P. Balharrie	8,543	11.78
Charles J. Tulley	6,959	9.59
Herbert McElroy	6,406	8.83
J. Lambert Payne	6,014	8.29
J. G. McGuire	5,586	7.70
Rupert Broadfoot	4,292	5.92
J. A. Forward	3,959	5.46
J. A. P. Haydon	3,586	4.94
Macdonald	3,446	4.75
Brethour	3,172	4.37
Brewer	2,176	3.00

== Ottawa City Council ==
(2 elected from each ward)

Rideau Ward
Candidate	Votes	%
Dave Esdale	556	25.34
Thomas H. Marcil	470	21.42
Cherry	404	18.41
Ackland	318	14.49
Goodhouse	247	11.26
Mackenzie	199	9.07

By Ward
Candidate	Votes	%
Eric Query	1,174	43.79
Fred Desjardins	1,037	38.68
Marcil	299	11.15
Charles Greenerg	171	6.38

St. George Ward
Candidate	Votes	%
Walter Cunningham	1,453	32.05
W. J. McCaffrey	1,203	26.53
W. J. Grace	1,045	23.05
Barrette	833	18.37

Wellington Ward
Candidate	Votes	%
James W. McNabb	2,252	44.98
Erenest D. Lowe	2,007	14.08
Hinchcliffe	748	14.94

Capital Ward
Candidate	Votes	%
McGregor Easson	2,611	31.66
Harold D. McCormick	1,804	21.87
Olmsted	1,584	19.20
Booth	1,074	13.02
Beaton	817	9.91
Rowen	358	4.34

Dalhousie Ward
Candidate	Votes	%
Sam Crooks	2,332	32.14
Fred Hunt	1,981	27.30
O'Meara	1,529	21.07
Morris	1,414	19.49

Victoria Ward
Candidate	Votes	%
Ernest Laroche	1,126	29.36
Patrick Nolan	974	25.40
Sims	886	23.10
Dent	849	22.14

Ottawa Ward
Candidate	Votes	%
Joseph Albert Pinard	1,007	29.34
Napoleon Bordeleau	983	28.64
Telmond St. Denis	787	22.93
McLaughlin	359	22.93
Poullotte	296	8.62

Central Ward
Candidate	Votes	%
William R. Low	1,771	30.38
C. Allen Snowdon	1,762	30.22
Shipman	1,508	25.87
Hamilton	789	13.53
