= 1920 Ottawa municipal election =

The city of Ottawa, Canada held municipal elections on January 5, 1920, to elect members of the 1920 Ottawa City Council.

== Mayor of Ottawa ==
Candidate	Votes	%
Harold Fisher	7,962	58.67
G. C. Hurdman	5,608	41.33

== Plebiscites ==
Vote on By-law to raise $300,000 by the issue of debentures for the purpose of constructing a new Police Station
Option	Votes	%
Against	4,473	72.79
For	1,672	27.21

Vote on By-law to raise $150,000 by the issue of debentures for the purpose of constructing a new Fire Station
Option	Votes	%
Against	4,485	71.93
For	1,750	28.07

Vote on the By-law to raise $700,000 by the issue of debentures for the purpose of constructing a Memorial Hall
Option	Votes	%
Against	4,911	81.13
For	1,142	18.87

Vote on By-Law to change the mode of Assessing For Taxation purposes
Option	Votes	%
Against	4,922	74.90
For	1,649	25.10

Vote on By-Law to raise $50,000 for Playgrounds and Recreation purposes
Option	Votes	%
For	3,264	50.91
Against	3,147	49.09

Vote on the question of the adoption of "Daylight Saving" during the period from the 1st of May to 1 October 1920
Option	Votes	%
Yes	8,411	65.13
No	4,908	36.85

== Ottawa Board of Control ==
John Cameron becomes the first "Labour" candidate ever to be elected to Ottawa's board of control. His "running mate", William Lodge was not as successful.

(4 elected)

Candidate	Votes	%
Napoléon Champagne	6,710	16.15
Frank H. Plant	6,594	15.87
Joseph Kent	6,534	15.72
John Cameron	6,339	15.25
W. H. Cluff	4,313	10.38
E. H. Hinchey	4,039	9.72
Thomas Brethour	3,726	8.97
William Lodge	3,301	7.94

== Ottawa City Council ==
(2 elected from each ward)

Rideau Ward
Candidate	Votes	%
Douglas H. Macdonald	347	31.55
Arthur Ellis	285	25.91
Kuske	166	15.09
Breary Slinn	164	14.91
Coattee	138	12.55

By Ward
Candidate	Votes	%
Edward Gaulin	669	35.21
Fred Desjardins	632	33.26
Labelle	460	24.21
Beaudet	139	7.32

St. George Ward
Candidate	Votes	%
Walter Cunningham	1,022	35.58
Wilfrid J. Grace	985	34.30
Serres	629	21.90
Binns	236	8.22

Wellington Ward
Candidate	Votes	%
James D. Denny	1,218	40.22
Erenest D. Lowe	1,115	36.82
Hunt	695	22.95

Capital Ward
Candidate	Votes	%
Arthur R. Ford	1,686	44.30
William Y. Denison	1,337	35.13
Patrick	783	20.57

Dalhousie Ward
Candidate	Votes	%
John P. Balharrie	1,366	33.44
James A. Forward	1,196	29.28
W. E. O'Meara	768	18.80
Cain	755	18.48

Victoria Ward
Candidate	Votes	%
Ernest Laroche	701	42.05
David Rice	604	36.23
Stimson	362	21.72

Ottawa Ward
Candidate	Votes	%
Joseph Albert Pinard	794	33.11
Napoleon Bordeleau	652	27.19
Waldo Guertin	396	16.51
Potvin	346	14.43
Lanthier	210	8.76

Central Ward
Candidate	Votes	%
John F. McKinley	1,500	44.99
Charles Pepper	1,402	42.05
Swan	432	12.96

=== By-election ===
There was a by-election held on March 22, 1920, to fill a vacancy created by the resignation of James D. Denny in Wellington Ward. Results:

Wellington Ward
Candidate	Votes	%
Joseph G. McGuire	441	35.54
J. W. McNabb	387	31.18
E. W. Marshall	158	12.73
William Lodge	125	10.07
C. R. Stephen	90	7.25
Fred Hunt	40	3.22
