= 1927 Ottawa municipal election =

The city of Ottawa, Canada held municipal elections on December 5, 1927 to elect members of the 1928 Ottawa City Council.

== Mayor of Ottawa ==
Controller Arthur Ellis defeated incumbent mayor John P. Balharrie and future mayor Patrick Nolan in a three-way race. Ellis won all but two of the city's nine wards, losing just the western wards of Dalhousie and Victoria to Nolan.

Candidate	Votes	%
Arthur Ellis	11,183	40.81
John P. Balharrie	8,415	30.71
Patrick Nolan	7,805	28.48

== Ottawa Board of Control ==
(4 elected)

Candidate	Votes	%
Charles J. Tulley	13,407	17.32
Frank H. Plant	13,185	17.03
Herbert McElroy	12,567	16.22
Frank LaFortune	12,558	16.22
Gerald Sims	8,825	11.40
Harold D. McCormick	7,911	10.22
H. J. McNulty	7,661	9.90
James Ryan	1,286	1.66

== Ottawa City Council ==
(2 elected from each ward)

Rideau Ward
Candidate	Votes	%
George H. Dunbar	628	26.09
Tom Brethour	594	24.68
David Esdale	522	21.69
Robert Ingram	339	14.08
Farmer	324	13.46

By Ward
Candidate	Votes	%
A. W. (Fred) Desjardins	1,238	37.82
Albert Parisien	1,026	31.34
Eric Query	1,009	30.83

St. George Ward
Candidate	Votes	%
T. E. Dansereau	1,367	30.47
Walter Cunningham	1,078	24.03
Norman H. MacDonald	1,074	23.94
George J. O'Connor	967	21.56

Wellington Ward
Candidate	Votes	%
James W. McNabb	2,196	37.23
J. Edward McVeigh	1,661	28.16
Willoughby	1,417	24.02
Marshall	625	10.60

Capital Ward
Candidate	Votes	%
John Warren York	Acclaimed	
McGregor Easson	Acclaimed	

Dalhousie Ward
Candidate	Votes	%
Sam Crooks	2,629	29.38
Jim Forward	2,050	22.91
Meagher	1,871	20.91
Stokes	945	10.56
Marsden	876	9.79
Megill	578	6.46

Victoria Ward
Candidate	Votes	%
Ernest Laroche	1,224	31.00
Nelson J. Lacasse	928	23.50
Cook	768	19.45
Russell Sparks	645	16.33
Scales	274	6.94
Sugrue	110	2.79

Ottawa Ward
Candidate	Votes	%
Aristide Belanger	1,302	32.36
Joseph Landriault	967	24.04
Lanthier	687	17.08
Bordeleau	585	14.54
Burrows	482	11.98

Central Ward
Candidate	Votes	%
Dr. G. M. Geldert	2,145	43.95
William R. Low	2,021	41.41
Stanley	714	14.63
