= 1925 Ottawa municipal election =

The city of Ottawa, Canada held municipal elections on December 7, 1925 to elect members of the 1926 Ottawa City Council.

== Mayor of Ottawa ==
Incumbent mayor John P. Balharrie is re-elected without opposition.

Candidate	Votes	%
John P. Balharrie	Acclaimed	

== Plebiscites ==
There were four plebiscites put to the voters. All four would fail.

Are you in favor (sic) of reducing the present city assessment on business, incomes and improvements at the rate of ten per cent a year until fifty per cent is exempted; and if the city services require the taxes thus lapsing, the assessment be placed on all land values in the city?
Option	Votes	%
No	9,868	53.48
Yes	8,583	46.52

Property owners struck down a proposal from cross town tracks.

Are you in favor (sic) of the Corporation applying to the legislature for authority to raise upon debentures and to pay over to the Canadian National Railways one-half the cost of establishing a new railway make-up yard southeast of the Rideau river and the amount necessary for track revision west of Graham's Bay at a total cost to the city not to exceed $350,000, such moneys to be paid such company on condition that it will remove its Bank and Elgin streets yards to such new location and will abandon through train movements between the canal and the western city limit?
Option	Votes	%
No	4,302	55.85
Yes	3,401	44.15

Voters also struck down a proposal to lengthen council terms to two-years. All but Central and St. George Wards were against.

Two-year terms
Option	Votes	%
Against	10,400	54.27
For	8,763	45.73

Property owners voted against a money debenture bylaw for $12,000 for the West End Market

West End Market
Option	Votes	%
Against	4,372	57.02
For	3,296	42.98

== Ottawa Board of Control ==
(4 elected)

Candidate	Votes	%
Frank H. Plant	11,676	18.03
Herbert McElroy	8,796	13.58
Arthur Ellis	8,307	12.83
Charles J. Tulley	7,784	12.02
Patrick Nolan	6,823	10.54
Omer Langlois	5,600	8.65
S. Rupert Broadfoot	4,911	7.58
Walter Cunningham	4,148	6.41
Fred Desjardins	3,359	5.19
Napoleon A. Bordeleau	3,357	5.18

== Ottawa City Council ==
(2 elected from each ward)

Rideau Ward
Candidate	Votes	%
Tom Brethour	525	24.93
David Esdale	525	24.93
Robert Ingram	435	20.66
Marcil	330	15.67
McCarthy	291	13.82

By Ward
Candidate	Votes	%
Frank LaFortune	Acclaimed	
Eric Query	Acclaimed	

St. George Ward
Candidate	Votes	%
Thomas E. Dansereau	Acclaimed	
Hugh J. McNulty	Acclaimed	

Wellington Ward
Candidate	Votes	%
James W. McNabb	1,599	32.31
Erenest D. Lowe	1,398	28.25
Willoughby	1,193	24.11
A. Gamble	759	15.34

Capital Ward
Candidate	Votes	%
McGregor Easson	2,813	43.09
Harold D. McCormick	2,522	38.63
Dr. McKinnon	1,193	18.28

Dalhousie Ward
Candidate	Votes	%
Sam Crooks	2,290	32.51
Jim Forward	1,744	24.76
McCarthy	1,201	17.05
John Dawson	988	14.02
Marsden	677	9.61
Fitzpatrick	145	2.06

Victoria Ward
Candidate	Votes	%
Ernest Laroche	Acclaimed	
Gerald Sims	Acclaimed	

Ottawa Ward
Candidate	Votes	%
J. A. Pinard	1,290	36.75
Aristide Belanger	1,215	34.62
St. Denis	1,005	28.63

Central Ward
Candidate	Votes	%
William R. Low	1,775	46.09
C. Allen Snowdon	1,576	40.92
Burgess	500	12.98
