= Rideau-Rockcliffe Ward =

Rideau-Rockcliffe
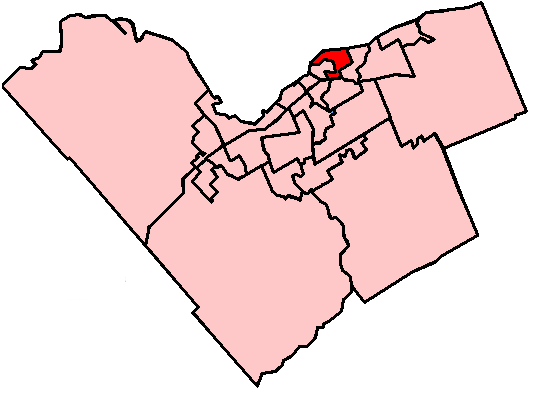
- Location within Ottawa
- Coordinates: 45°27′N 75°38′W
- Country: Canada
- Province: Ontario
- City: Ottawa

Government
  - Councillor: Rawlson King

Area
  - Total: 19.8 km^{2} (7.6 sq mi)

Population (2016)2016 Canadian census
  - Total: 36,030
  - Density: 1,820/km^{2} (4,710/sq mi)

Languages (2016)
  - English: 50.5%
  - French: 30.3%
  - Arabic: 4.4%
  - Spanish: 1.5%
  - Somali: 1.4%
  - Creoles: 1.3%
  - Portuguese: 1.0%
- Avg. income: $44,561

Rideau-Rockcliffe Ward (Ward 13) is a city ward in Ottawa, Ontario. Located in the city's east end, the ward covers the neighbourhoods of New Edinburgh, Manor Park, Rockcliffe Park, Wateridge Village, Overbrook, Lindenlea, Viscount Alexander Park, Carson Meadows, Cardinal Glen, Rockcliffe Mews, Forbes, Castle Heights and part of Carson Grove.

Prior to amalgamation, the area was part of Rideau Ward. The name "Rideau Ward" has been applied to this area since New Edinburgh was annexed by Ottawa in 1887. It was first contested in the 1887 municipal election, and was known as New Edinburgh Ward in the 1887 and 1888 elections. This recent incarnation of Rideau Ward was created in 1994 from Overbrook-Forbes Ward and part of By-Rideau Ward. It was initially named Ward 4 before being renamed Rideau in 1995.

== Councillors ==
Council	Aldermen		
1887	John Askwith	John Henderson	John C. Roger
1888	John Askwith	John Henderson	John C. Roger
1889	John Askwith	John Henderson	John C. Roger
1890	John Askwith	John Henderson	Thomas Tubman
1891	James D. Fraser	John Henderson	John C. Roger
1892	James D. Fraser	George Forde	Joseph Hawken
1893	James D. Fraser	John C. Roger	Joseph Hawken
1894	James D. Fraser	John C. Roger	Joseph Hawken
1895	Basil H. Bell	George Forde	F. H. Martelock
1896	Basil H. Bell	George Forde	J. B. Donaldson
1897	James D. Fraser	John C. Roger	J. B. Donaldson
1898	Breary Slinn	John C. Roger	J. B. Donaldson
1899	Breary Slinn	John C. Roger	Basil H. Bell
1899	Breary Slinn	John C. Roger	George Forde (from Mar. 1899)
1900	Breary Slinn	John C. Roger	George Forde (from Mar. 1899)
1901	John Askwith	James A. Ellis	John C. Grant
1902	John Askwith	James A. Ellis	Breary Slinn
1903	John Askwith	James A. Ellis	John C. Grant
1904	John Askwith	O. E. Culbert	John C. Grant
1905	John Askwith	Breary Slinn	John C. Grant
1906	J. H. Putnam	Breary Slinn	William Short
1907	John C. Grant	John Askwith	William Short
1908	John C. Grant	Breary Slinn	
1909	John C. Grant	Breary Slinn	
1910	John C. Grant	Thomas E. McDonald	
1911	John C. Grant	Breary Slinn	
1912	Frank E. Perney	Breary Slinn	
1913	Tom Brethour	William Cherry	
1914	Tom Brethour	Harry Low	
1915	Tom Brethour	Henry Ackland	
1916	Tom Brethour	William Cherry	
1917	Breary Slinn	William Cherry	
1918	Douglas H. Macdonald	William Cherry	
1919	Douglas H. Macdonald	Beary Slinn	
1920	Douglas H. Macdonald	Arthur Ellis	
1921	Douglas H. Macdonald	Rupert Broadfoot	
1922	Douglas H. Macdonald	Rupert Broadfoot	
1923	Douglas H. Macdonald	Rupert Broadfoot	
1924	Dave Esdale	Thomas H. Marcil	
1925	Dave Esdale	Tom Brethour	
1926	Dave Esdale	Tom Brethour	
1927	Dave Esdale	Robert Ingram	
1928	Tom Brethour	George H. Dunbar	
1929	Tom Brethour	Rod Plant	
1930	Tom Brethour	Rod Plant	
1931	Tom Brethour	Rod Plant	
1932	Tom Brethour	Rod Plant	
1933	Charles E. Reid	Rod Plant	
1934	A. W. Spearman	Rod Plant	
1935	A. W. Spearman	Shirley S. Slinn	
1936	A. W. Spearman	Shirley S. Slinn	
1937	Fred J. Goodhouse	John Powers (until Oct. 1951)	
1938	Fred J. Goodhouse	John Powers (until Oct. 1951)	
1939	Fred J. Goodhouse	John Powers (until Oct. 1951)	
1940	A. W. Spearman	John Powers (until Oct. 1951)	
1941–42	A. W. Spearman	John Powers (until Oct. 1951)	
1943–44	Leslie G. Avery	John Powers (until Oct. 1951)	
1945–46	Leslie G. Avery	John Powers (until Oct. 1951)	
1947–48	Leslie G. Avery	John Powers (until Oct. 1951)	
1949–50	Leslie G. Avery	John Powers (until Oct. 1951)	
1951–52	Leslie G. Avery	John Powers (until Oct. 1951)	
1951–52	Leslie G. Avery	Alex Roger (from Oct. 1951)	
1953–54	Robert Groves	Alex Roger (from Oct. 1951)	
1955–56	Robert Groves	Pat Doherty	
1957–58	Robert Groves	Jessen Wentzell	
1959–60	Robert Groves	Jessen Wentzell	
1961–62	Ellen Webber	Jessen Wentzell	
1961–62	Ellen Webber	John Powers (from 1962)	
1963–64	Des Bender	John Powers (from 1962)	
1965–66	Des Bender	John Powers (from 1962)	
1967–69	Des Bender	John Powers (from 1962)	
1970–72	Des Bender	Tom McDougall (until Sept 1972)	
1973–74	Rhéal Robert		
1975–76	Rhéal Robert		
1977–78	Rhéal Robert		
1978–80	Rhéal Robert		
Council	By-Rideau	Overbrook-Forbes	
1980–82	Marc Laviolette (until Feb. 1991)	Rhéal Robert	
1982–85	Marc Laviolette (until Feb. 1991)	Rhéal Robert	
1985–88	Marc Laviolette (until Feb. 1991)	George Kelly	
1988–91	Marc Laviolette (until Feb. 1991)	George Kelly	
1988–91	Pierre Bourque (from Mar. 1991)	George Kelly	
1991–94	Richard Cannings	Jacques Legendre	
Council	City Councillor	Regional Councillor	
1994–97	Richard Cannings	Jacques Legendre	
1997–00	Richard Cannings	Jacques Legendre	
Council	City Councillor		
2001–03	Jacques Legendre		
2003–06	Jacques Legendre		
2006–10	Jacques Legendre		
2010–14	Peter D. Clark		
2014–18	Tobi Nussbaum (until Jan. 2019)		
2018–22	Tobi Nussbaum (until Jan. 2019)		
2018–22	Rawlson King (from Apr. 2019)		

== School trustees ==
- Ottawa-Carleton District School Board: Lyra Evans (Zone 6, with Rideau-Vanier Ward)
- Ottawa Catholic School Board: Thérèse Maloney Cousineau (Zone 10, with Somerset Ward and Rideau-Vanier Ward)
- Conseil des écoles publiques de l'Est de l'Ontario: Marielle Godbout (Zone 9, with Alta Vista Ward)
- Conseil des écoles catholiques du Centre-Est: Denis Poirier (Zone 11, with Beacon Hill-Cyrville Ward)

== Election results ==
=== 1994 elections ===
1994 RMOC elections: Regional council
Candidate	Votes	%
Jacques Legendre	3,317	34.49
Julie Taub	2,348	24.42
Joan Gullen	2,059	21.41
George Kelly	1,893	19.68

1994 Ottawa municipal election: Ward 4
Candidate	Votes	%
Richard Cannings	5,122	57.73
Michael Green	2,575	29.02
Brian Cunningham	1,175	13.24

=== 1997 elections ===
1997 RMOC elections: Regional council
Candidate	Votes	%
Jacques Legendre	4,870	85.62
Efren Marquez	818	14.38

1997 Ottawa municipal election: Rideau Ward
Candidate	Votes	%
Richard Cannings	Acclaimed	

=== 2000 Ottawa municipal election ===
City council
Candidate	Votes	%
Jacques Legendre	7,269	64.07
Richard Cannings	4,077	35.93

=== 2003 Ottawa municipal election ===
City council
Candidate	Votes	%
Jacques Legendre	6,070	79.17
James Parker	934	12.18
Michel Binda	663	8.65

=== 2006 Ottawa municipal election ===
City council
Candidate	Votes	%
Jacques Legendre	7,450	62.35
Maurice Lamirande	1,953	16.34
James Parker	1,248	10.44
Jules Bouvier	1,077	9.01
Muinis Ramadan	221	1.85

=== 2010 Ottawa municipal election ===
City council
Candidate	Votes	%
Peter D. Clark	2,722	25.84
Maurice Lamirande	1,835	17.42
Sheila Perry	1,709	16.22
Bruce Poulin	1,695	16.09
Richard Cannings	1,333	12.65
Corry Burke	438	4.16
Rawlson King	380	3.61
Pierre Maheu	224	2.13
Harley Collison	129	1.22
James Parker	69	0.66

=== 2014 Ottawa municipal election ===
City council
Candidate	Vote	%
Tobi Nussbaum	4,846	47.19
Peter D. Clark (X)	1,871	18.22
Sheila Perry	1,423	13.86
Penny Thompson	994	9.68
Jevone Nicholas	846	8.24
Cam Holmstrom	290	2.82

Ottawa mayor (Ward results)
Candidate	Vote	%
Jim Watson	8,138	80.83
Mike Maguire	1,215	12.07
Rebecca Pyrah	165	1.64
Michael St. Arnaud	138	1.37
Anwar Syed	129	1.28
Robert White	100	0.99
Bernard Couchman	93	0.92
Darren W. Wood	90	0.89

=== 2018 Ottawa municipal election ===
Council candidate	Vote	%
Tobi Nussbaum	7,334	80.52
Peter Heyck	1,774	19.48

Ottawa mayor (Ward results)
Candidate	Vote	%
Jim Watson	5,120	55.99
Clive Doucet	3,123	34.15
Bruce McConville	430	4.70
Joey Drouin	98	1.07
Hamid Alakozai	72	0.79
Craig MacAulay	55	0.60
Ahmed Bouragba	53	0.58
Bernard Couchman	49	0.54
Moises Schachtler	39	0.43
James T. Sheahan	39	0.43
Michael Pastien	38	0.42
Ryan Lythall	28	0.31

=== 2019 by-election ===
There was a by-election on April 15, 2019, to replace Nussbaum, who was appointed as the CEO for the National Capital Commission.

Candidates

- Kasia Adamiec - Worked at the federal and municipal level of politics, founding member of the Ottawa Police Youth Advisory Committee Endorsed by Former Conservative MP Ted Opitz.
- Idris Ben-Tahir
- Marc Dorgeville - Financial counsellor and former climate science researcher.
- Bruce A. Faulkner
- Johan Hamels - Green Party of Canada International liaison
- Peter Heyck - Ran in this ward in 2018
- Miklos Horvath
- Peter Jan Karwacki
- Rawlson King - President of the Overbrook community association. Endorsed by city councillors Catherine McKenney and Shawn Menard, NDP MPP Joel Harden, OCDSB School Trustees Lyra Evans and Chris Ellis, and former city councillor Clive Doucet.
- Jerry Kovacs
- Jamie Kwong - former Quartier Vanier Merchants Association executive director. Endorsed by former Liberal MP Bryon Wilfert and former city councillor Bob Monette
- Maurice Lamirande - Former school trustee for Conseil des écoles catholiques du Centre-Est.
- Patrick Mayangi
- Oriana Ngabirano - Reputation manager and public relations specialist
- Chris Penton
- Sheila Perry - Teacher, president of the Federation of Community Associations of Ottawa and President of the Ottawa Council of Women. Past President of the Overbrook Community Association. Endorsed by city councillor Jeff Leiper and former city councillor Marianne Wilkinson.
- Penny Thompson - President of the Manor Park Community Association. Endorsed by former Liberal MPP Madeleine Meilleur and former city councillor Peter D. Clark.

Results

Council candidate	Vote	%
Rawlson King	1,529	18.36
Jamie Kwong	1,406	16.88
Penny Thompson	851	10.22
Marc Dorgeville	794	9.53
Sheila Perry	742	8.91
Maurice Lamirande	708	8.50
Johan Hamels	665	7.98
Kasia Adamiec	507	6.09
Chris Penton	441	5.29
Oriana Ngabirano	247	2.97
Patrick Mayangi	135	1.62
Miklos Horvath	89	1.07
Peter Heyck	58	0.70
Peter Jan Karwacki	48	0.58
Jerry Kovacs	46	0.55
Idris Ben-Tahir	35	0.42
Bruce A. Faulkner	29	0.35

=== 2022 Ottawa municipal election ===
Council candidate	Vote	%
Rawlson King	8,481	80.14
Clayton Fitzsimmons	859	8.12
Peter Jan Karwacki	716	6.77
Peter Zanette	527	4.98

=== 2026 Ottawa municipal election ===
2026 Ottawa municipal election: Rideau-Rockcliffe
Candidate	Popular vote			Expenditures
Candidate	Votes	%	±%	Expenditures
Rawlson King (X)	8,181	81.53		
Peter J. Karwacki	1,853	18.47		
Total valid votes	10,545			
Total rejected, unmarked and declined votes				
Turnout		31.44		
Eligible voters	33,545			
Note: Candidate campaign colours are based on the prominent colour used in campaign items (signs, literature, etc.) and are used as a visual differentiation between candidates.
