= 1928 Ottawa municipal election =

The city of Ottawa, Canada held municipal elections on December 3, 1928 to elect members of the 1929 Ottawa City Council.

== Mayor of Ottawa ==
Incumbent mayor Arthur Ellis was re-elected without opposition.

Candidate	Votes	%
Arthur Ellis	Acclaimed	

== Plebiscites ==
Property owners voted in favour of improving water supply in the city which would involve allowing the city to spend $1,315,000 for a water filtration system.

Water filtration
Choice	Votes	%
Yes	7,323	81.28
No	1,687	18.72

City residents voted in favour to continue using daylight saving time in the city.

Daylight saving
Choice	Votes	%
Yes	14,506	59.49
No	9,877	40.51

== Ottawa Board of Control ==
(4 elected)

Candidate	Votes	%
Frank H. Plant	16,540	23.31
Charles J. Tulley	12,024	16.94
Frank LaFortune	11,226	15.82
Gerald Sims	10,781	15.19
Harold D. McCormick	9,610	13.54
George H. Dunbar	8,711	12.28
Alex Leckie	1,141	1.61
James Ryan	929	1.31

== Ottawa City Council ==
(2 elected from each ward)

Rideau Ward
Candidate	Votes	%
Rod Plant	636	28.35
Tom Brethour	580	25.86
W. Cherry	435	19.39
R. Ingram	371	16.54
A. Ackland	221	9.85

By Ward
Candidate	Votes	%
A. W. (Fred) Desjardins	1,240	36.02
Eric Query	1,239	35.99
J. A. Parisien	964	28.00

St. George Ward
Candidate	Votes	%
Norman H. MacDonald	1,474	31.77
T. E. Dansereau	1,470	31.69
Walter Cunningham	1,267	27.31
J. M. Dugas	428	9.23

Wellington Ward
Candidate	Votes	%
James W. McNabb	Acclaimed	
J. Edward McVeigh	Acclaimed	

Capital Ward
Candidate	Votes	%
John Warren York	3,514	37.30
George Pushman	2,533	26.88
George Sloan	2,152	22.84
Dr. W. T. Mackinnon	1,223	12.98

Dalhousie Ward
Candidate	Votes	%
Sam Crooks	2,871	37.09
Jim Forward	2,517	32.52
J. F. Meagher	2,352	30.39

Victoria Ward
Candidate	Votes	%
Ernest Laroche	1,280	40.20
Nelson J. Lacasse	1,175	36.90
John R. Welch	831	21.01
Harry Scales	729	22.90

Ottawa Ward
Candidate	Votes	%
Aristide Belanger	1,614	39.74
J. A. Pinard	1,103	27.16
Joseph Landriault	968	23.84
J. Whelan	376	9.26

Central Ward
Candidate	Votes	%
Dr. G. M. Geldert	1,902	37.37
William R. Low	1,647	32.36
J. E. Stanley Lewis	1,540	30.26
