= 1935 Ottawa municipal election =

The city of Ottawa, Canada held municipal elections on December 2, 1935.

== Mayor of Ottawa ==
Candidate	Votes	%
J. E. Stanley Lewis	17,810	49.28
Fulgence Charpentier	9,755	26.99
Patrick Nolan (X)	6,414	17.75
Edward H. Hinchey	2,164	5.99

== Plebiscites ==
Are you in favour of the adoption of daylight saving in the city during June, July and August only instead of during the months of May, June, July, August and September as at present?
Option	Votes	%
No	17,885	
Yes	16,354	

Are you in favour of electing members of City Council, including the Mayor and members of the Board of Control, every second year to hold office for a period of two years?
Option	Votes	%
No	19,981	
Yes	13,342	

(Only property owners could vote for the following measure)

Are you in favour of the corporation paying all its share of direct relief each year out of the current revenues of the corporation for this purpose?
Option	Votes	%
No	5,601	
Yes	4,429	

== Ottawa Board of Control ==
(4 elected)

Candidate	Votes	%
G. M. Geldert (X)	19,362	
George H. Dunbar	14,232	
Allan B. Turner	13,252	
J. Edward McVeigh (X)	12,725	
Thomas Brethour	10,018	
E. A. Bourque	9,882	
Harold C. Shipman	9,563	
Martin M. Walsh	7,650	
Mrs. C. H. Hesser	1,588	
Percy E. Bedford	789	
William Watson	578	
W. Gibbs	424	
James Sidey	234	

== Ottawa City Council ==
(2 elected from each ward)

Rideau Ward
Candidate	Votes	%
A. W. Spearman (X)	934	
Shirley S. Slinn (X)	904	
Fred J. Goodhouse	660	

By Ward
Candidate	Votes	%
J. Albert Parisien (X)	1,329	
Eric Query (X)	1,018	
Mendoza Normand	959	
Joseph P. Butler	482	
H. Louis Tasse	204	
J. P. Romeo Croteau	193	

St. George's Ward
Candidate	Votes	%
Arthur Pinard (X)	2,351	
Norman H. MacDonald (X)	2,159	
Arthur A. Moeser	1,203	
W. P. Clermont	287	

Wellington Ward
Candidate	Votes	%
James W. McNabb (X)	2,175	
Arthur J. Ash	1,042	
Sam Chandler	1,002	
Robert Burnett	823	
James McLaren	671	
T. M. Rae	402	
Otto O'Regan	278	
James J. Enright	251	
S. J. Johnson	149	
E. J. Kesteron	49	
James Connah	19	

Capital Ward
Candidate	Votes	%
Edward Band (X)	2,931	
Harold D. Marshall (X)	2,596	
A. T. MacFarlane	1,216	
Cecil Elbourne	228	

Dalhousie Ward
Candidate	Votes	%
Daniel McCann (X)	2,248	
Wilbert Hamilton (X)	1,989	
James J. McVeigh	959	
R. E. Brule	925	
James R. Sands	742	

Elmdale Ward
Candidate	Votes	%
William H. Marsden (X)	1,595	
Jim Forward (X)	1,458	
Henry Bradley	1,207	
Harry Low	825	

Victoria Ward
Candidate	Votes	%
Nelson J. Lacasse (X)	1,448	
Joseph P. Nolan (X)	1,249	
J. T. H. Langdon	1,191	
Dolphio Bonenfant	488	

Ottawa Ward
Candidate	Votes	%
Aristide Belanger (X)	1,754	
Napoleon Bordeleau (X)	1,544	
A. Edmond Beauchamp	1,159	

Riverdale Ward
Candidate	Votes	%
David McMillan (X)	2,287	
George Sloan (X)	1,967	
Harold Maguire	784	
Robert L. Haggard	195	

Central Ward
Candidate	Votes	%
Finley McRae (X)	1,969	
Fred Jounreaux	1,806	
T. H. Kirby Bangs	1,380	
Caroline A. Cullock	757	
V. R. Leseaux	382	
