= 1933 Ottawa municipal election =

The city of Ottawa, Canada held municipal elections on December 4, 1933.

== Mayor of Ottawa ==
Candidate	Votes	%
Patrick Nolan	19,634	
John J. Allen (X)	13,577	
Peter Alex Cray	387	
Dudley Booth	356	

== Ottawa Board of Control ==
(4 elected)

Candidate	Votes	%
Thomas Brethour	18,830	
J. E. Stanley Lewis (X)	16,707	
G. M. Geldert (X)	15,402	
Fulgence Charpentier (X)	14,820	
J. Edward McVeigh	14,559	
George H. Dunbar (X)	12,925	
Joseph McHugh	2,246	
Caleb S. Green	1,739	

== Ottawa City Council ==
(2 elected from each ward)

Rideau Ward
Candidate	Votes	%
Rod Plant (X)	903	
A. W. Spearman	734	
Charles E. Reid (X)	626	
Charles J. Schiemann	223	

By Ward
Candidate	Votes	%
A. W. Desjardins (X)	1,471	
Joseph Albert Parisien	1,354	
Raoul Mercier (X)	1,322	

St. George's Ward
Candidate	Votes	%
Norman H. MacDonald (X)	2,078	
Arthur Pinard (X)	2,017	
Walter Cunningham	1,716	
Charles Horwitz	190	

Wellington Ward
Candidate	Votes	%
James W. McNabb (X)	2,389	
Martin M. Walsh	2,026	
C. Clifford Taggart	1,769	
Edward E. Kesterten	165	

Capital Ward
Candidate	Votes	%
Edward Band (X)	Acclaimed	
Harold D. Marshall (X)	Acclaimed	

Dalhousie Ward
Candidate	Votes	%
Daniel McCann	2,285	
James J. McVeigh (X)	1,315	
Wilbert Hamilton (X)	1,268	
Rudolphe Brule	737	
Robert George Wright	148	

Elmdale Ward
Candidate	Votes	%
William H. Marsden (X)	1,773	
Jim Forward (X)	1,656	
Henry Bradley	1,407	

Victoria Ward
Candidate	Votes	%
Nelson J. Lacasse (X)	1,819	
John R. Welch (X)	1,534	
Hugh B. Devine	536	
Harry Seales	501	

Ottawa Ward
Candidate	Votes	%
Aristide Belanger (X)	1,861	
Napoleon Bordeleau (X)	1,836	
Aurelien Rose	418	

Riverdale Ward
Candidate	Votes	%
George Sloan (X)	1,966	
David McMillan	1,521	
W. T. M. MacKinnon	1,378	
James Sidey	176	

Central Ward
Candidate	Votes	%
Kirby Bangs (X)	1,736	
Harold C. Shipman (X)	1,718	
Finley McRae	1,696	
Eric Hind	1,117	
