= December 1924 Ottawa municipal election =

The city of Ottawa, Canada held municipal elections on December 1, 1924, to elect members of the 1925 Ottawa City Council. It was the second municipal election held in the 1924 calendar year, as the previous election was held on January 7.

== Mayor of Ottawa ==
Candidate	Votes	%
John P. Balharrie	15,159	60.37
Arthur Ellis	8,405	33.47
W. E. Brown	1,546	6.16

== Ottawa Board of Control ==
(4 elected)

Candidate	Votes	%
Frank H. Plant	11,642	15.56
Herbert McElroy	11,290	15.08
Charles J. Tulley	11,064	14.78
Napoléon Champagne	8,689	12.95
J. Lambert Payne	8,509	11.37
Patrick Nolan	8,431	11.26
Fred Desjardins	6,006	8.02
J. A. P. Haydon	5,293	7.07
F. M. Cross	1,674	2.24
William T. Ashe	1,246	1.66

== Ottawa City Council ==
(2 elected from each ward)

Rideau Ward
Candidate	Votes	%
David Esdale	582	29.39
Tom Brethour	505	25.51
McCarthy	470	23.74
Marcil	423	21.36

By Ward
Candidate	Votes	%
Eric Query	1,031	35.01
Frank Lafortune	873	29.64
Labelle	758	25.74
Marcil	283	9.61

St. George Ward
Candidate	Votes	%
Omer Langlois	1,213	25.50
Walter Cunningham	1,201	25.25
Hugh J. McNulty	1,057	22.22
Grace	768	16.14
Whyte	518	10.89

Wellington Ward
Candidate	Votes	%
James W. McNabb	2,071	38.59
Erenest D. Lowe	1,684	31.38
Willoughby	981	18.28
Hinchcliffe	631	11.76

Capital Ward
Candidate	Votes	%
McGregor Easson	Acclaimed	
Harold D. McCormick	Acclaimed	

Dalhousie Ward
Candidate	Votes	%
Sam Crooks	2,610	32.07
Jim Forward	1,893	23.26
Morris	1,448	17.79
McCarthy	1,374	16.88
Marsden	814	10.00

Victoria Ward
Candidate	Votes	%
Gerald Sims	1,368	36.65
Ernest Laroche	1,258	33.70
Dent	1,107	29.65

Ottawa Ward
Candidate	Votes	%
Telmond St. Denis	1,219	36.54
Napoleon Bordeleau	1,197	35.88
J. A. Pinard	920	27.58

Central Ward
Candidate	Votes	%
William R. Low	Acclaimed	
C. Allen Snowdon	Acclaimed	
