= 1926 Ottawa municipal election =

The city of Ottawa, Canada held municipal elections on December 6, 1926 to elect members of the 1927 Ottawa City Council.

== Mayor of Ottawa ==
Incumbent mayor John P. Balharrie is re-elected, defeating future mayors Patrick Nolan (a former alderman) and controller Frank H. Plant. Balharrie won eight of the city's nine wards, losing just Victoria Ward to Nolan.

Candidate	Votes	%
John P. Balharrie	12,336	49.49
Patrick Nolan	6,354	25.49
Frank H. Plant	6,237	25.02

== Plebiscites ==
Property owners voted against a plebiscite which would have raised $330,000 to pay for the removal of cross-town tracks.

Removal of cross-town tracks
Option	Votes	%
No	4,364	53.50
Yes	3,793	46.50

Voters approved a plebiscite to move public school board elections from being elected by ward to an at-large voting system.

Public school board
Option	Votes	%
Yes	8,323	63.77
No	4,728	36.23

== Ottawa Board of Control ==
(4 elected)

Candidate	Votes	%
Charles J. Tulley	13,971	20.22
Arthur Ellis	12,134	17.56
Herbert McElroy	11,453	16.58
Frank LaFortune	10,271	14.87
H. J. McNulty	7,323	10.60
E. M. Barrett	6,907	10.00
Harold D. McCormick	5,564	8.04
J. W. Hinchcliffe	1,460	2.11

== Ottawa City Council ==
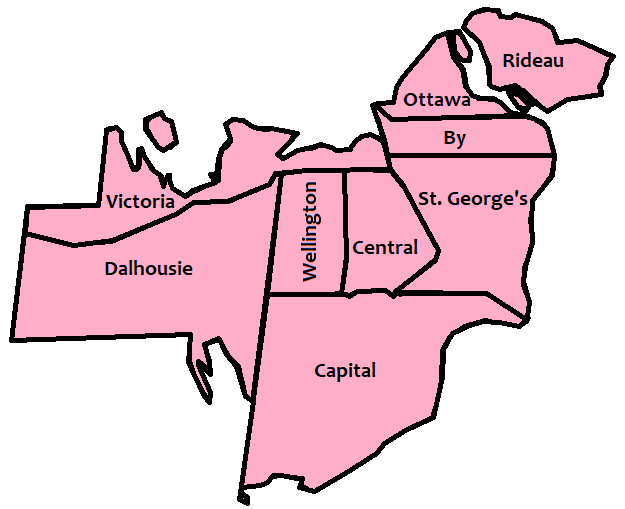
Wards used in this election

(2 elected from each ward)

Rideau Ward
Candidate	Votes	%
Robert Ingram	735	37.91
David Esdale	638	32.90
Tom Brethour	566	29.19

By Ward
Candidate	Votes	%
Eric Query	994	32.76
A. W. (Fred) Desjardins	930	30.65
Albert Parisien	730	24.06
Greenberg	248	8.17
Ryan	132	4.35

St. George Ward
Candidate	Votes	%
T. E. Dansereau	Acclaimed	
George J. O'Connor	Acclaimed	

Wellington Ward
Candidate	Votes	%
James W. McNabb	1,813	37.16
E. D. Lowe	1,585	32.49
J. Edward McVeigh	1,481	30.35

Capital Ward
Candidate	Votes	%
John Warren York	2,943	36.09
McGregor Easson	2,777	34.06
McKinnon	1,221	14.97
Rose	1,213	14.88

Dalhousie Ward
Candidate	Votes	%
Sam Crooks	2,844	36.38
Jim Forward	2,352	30.08
McCarthy	1,544	19.75
Stokes	1,078	13.79

Victoria Ward
Candidate	Votes	%
Ernest Laroche	Acclaimed	
Gerald Sims	Acclaimed	

Ottawa Ward
Candidate	Votes	%
Aristide Belanger	1,367	35.52
Joseph Landriault	1,017	26.43
Lanthier	753	19.57
St. Denis	711	18.48

Central Ward
Candidate	Votes	%
Dr. G. M. Geldert	2,284	45.74
William R. Low	1,406	28.16
C. Allen Snowdon	1,303	26.10
