= 1922 Ottawa municipal election =

The city of Ottawa, Canada held municipal elections on January 2, 1922, to elect members of the 1922 Ottawa City Council.

== Mayor of Ottawa ==
Candidate	Votes	%
Frank H. Plant	10,923	68.86
Joseph Kent	4,698	29.62
W. K. McManus	241	1.52

== Plebiscites ==
Municipal ownership of the Ottawa Street Railway
Option	Votes	%
No	8,430	58.41
Yes	6,003	41.59

Extension of franchise to Ottawa Electric Railway Company
Option	Votes	%
Yes	8,415	58.09
No	6,070	41.91

Service at cost agreement
Option	Votes	%
Against	10,639	76.08
For	3,345	23.92

$50,000 bylaw for acquiring more land for playgrounds
Option	Votes	%
Against	4,127	59.21
For	2,843	40.79

$10,000 grant for G.W.V.A. Relief
Option	Votes	%
Against	4,567	63.23
For	2,656	36.77

== Ottawa Board of Control ==
(4 elected)

Candidate	Votes	%
Arthur Ellis	6,627	13.55
John P. Balharrie	6,617	13.53
Napoléon Champagne	6,211	12.70
John Cameron	6,142	12.56
Joseph McGuire	5,306	10.85
J. A. Pinard	4,577	9.36
J. J. Slattery	3,971	8.12
Thomas Brethour	3,389	6.93
Mrs. J. A. Wilson	2,467	5.04
Clary	1,952	3.99
J. W. Hinchcliffe	730	1.49
Brigham	586	1.20
Peter Leckie	339	0.69

== Ottawa City Council ==
(2 elected from each ward)

Rideau Ward
Candidate	Votes	%
Douglas H. Macdonald	408	29.91
Rupert Broadfoot	357	26.17
Thomas Marcil	242	17.74
Henry Ackland	189	13.86
John Mackenzie	168	12.32

By Ward
Candidate	Votes	%
Edward Gaulin	618	29.94
Fred Desjardins	574	27.81
Eric Query	506	24.52
O. Langlois	366	17.73

St. George Ward
Candidate	Votes	%
William McCaffrey	1,024	30.93
Walter Cunningham	897	27.09
William E. Hastey	772	23.32
Leslie Whyte	618	18.67

Wellington Ward
Candidate	Votes	%
James W. McNabb	Acclaimed	
Erenest D. Lowe	Acclaimed	

Capital Ward
Candidate	Votes	%
H. H. McElroy	1,830	35.88
T. H. Brewer	1,206	23.64
Charles J. Tulley	1,106	21.68
J. R. Munroe	766	15.02
Godfrey B. Peterkin	193	3.78

Dalhousie Ward
Candidate	Votes	%
J. A. Forward	1,358	28.06
W. E. O'Meara	1,004	20.75
Fred Hunt	992	20.50
Daniel McCann	545	11.26
Freeman Rowe	441	9.11
H. A. Jarvis	367	7.58
Edward Fitzpatrick	132	2.73

Victoria Ward
Candidate	Votes	%
Ernest Laroche	813	40.21
Patrick Nolan	718	35.51
C. W. Lewis	491	24.28

Ottawa Ward
Candidate	Votes	%
Napoleon Bordeleau	925	37.83
Waldo Guertin	884	36.16
Romeo R. Marcil	364	14.89
Charles Lapierre	272	11.12

Central Ward
Candidate	Votes	%
Charles George Pepper	Acclaimed	
Charles Allen Snowdon	Acclaimed	
