= 1921 Ottawa municipal election =

The city of Ottawa, Canada held municipal elections on January 3, 1921, to elect members of the 1921 Ottawa City Council.

== Mayor of Ottawa ==
Election day results showed Plant defeating Kent by six votes. A recount showed he won by 22 votes.

Candidate	Votes	%
Frank H. Plant	7,826	50.07
Joseph Kent	7,804	49.93

== Plebiscites ==
Bylaw on the purchase of the Ottawa Electric Railway
Option	Votes	%
Against	4,448	65.57
For	2,336	34.43

Bylaw to raise $200,000 for a new Central fire hall
Option	Votes	%
Against	5,736	81.21
For	1,327	18.79

Bylaw to spend $60,000 in the purchase of a stone quarry and stone crushing machine
Option	Votes	%
Against	4,023	57.12
For	3,020	42.88

Plebiscite for a two-year aldermanic term
Option	Votes	%
Against	9,741	67.24
For	4,746	32.76

== Ottawa Board of Control ==
(4 elected)

Candidate	Votes	%
Napoléon Champagne	7,186	15.00
John Cameron	6,412	13.38
Arthur Ellis	4,430	9.24
John P. Balharrie	3,774	7.88
Joseph McGuire	3,642	7.60
Jack McKinley	3,461	7.22
Lt.-Col. D. H. Maclean	3,391	7.08
W. J. Grace	3,316	6.92
W. P. Grant	3,063	6.39
E. H. Hinchey	2,856	5.96
Thomas Brethour	2,513	5.24
Lodge	2,166	4.52
Rice	1,710	3.57

== Ottawa City Council ==
(2 elected from each ward)

Rideau Ward
Candidate	Votes	%
D. H. Macdonald	408	32.36
Rupert Broadfoot	402	31.88
Cherry	244	19.35
Pasch	207	16.42

By Ward
Candidate	Votes	%
Edward Gaulin	750	36.82
Fred Desjardins	715	35.10
Query	370	18.16
Greenberg	202	9.92

St. George Ward
Candidate	Votes	%
Walter Cunningham	729	21.81
Leslie Whyte	544	16.27
O'Connor	520	15.55
Hastey	515	15.41
Code	482	14.42
Lalonde	340	10.17
Reynolds	213	6.37

Wellington Ward
Candidate	Votes	%
James W. McNabb	1,336	40.63
Erenest D. Lowe	1,175	35.74
Marshall	777	23.63

Capital Ward
Candidate	Votes	%
Herbert H. McElroy	1,075	21.43
J. J. Slattery	612	12.20
Spence	605	12.06
W. Y. Denison	578	11.52
McCormack	572	11.40
Tulley	506	10.09
Patrick	400	7.97
Bayman	316	6.30
Ferguson	284	5.66
Turner	68	1.36

Dalhousie Ward
Candidate	Votes	%
J. A. Forward	1,502	32.95
Fred Hunt	1,215	26.66
W. E. O'Meara	982	21.54
Cain	859	18.85

Victoria Ward
Candidate	Votes	%
Ernest Laroche	809	37.75
Sam Rosenthal	705	32.90
Lewis	462	21.56
Sugrue	167	7.79

Ottawa Ward
Candidate	Votes	%
Napoleon Bordeleau	879	37.06
J. A. Pinard	745	31.41
Waldo Guertin	581	24.49
Beaudet	167	7.04

Central Ward
Candidate	Votes	%
Charles Pepper	1,043	26.27
C. Allen Snowdon	1,021	25.71
Low	500	12.59
Huband	483	12.16
Hamilton	362	9.12
Sherwood	330	8.31
Sampson	232	5.84
