= 1934 Ottawa municipal election =

The city of Ottawa, Canada held municipal elections on December 3, 1934.

== Mayor of Ottawa ==
Candidate	Votes	%
Patrick Nolan (X)	27,064	
Albert H. Cole	2,394	
William P. Clermont	1,380	
James Connah	327	
Edward E. Kesteron	266	

== Ottawa Board of Control ==
(4 elected)

Candidate	Votes	%
J. E. Stanley Lewis (X)	14,602	
G. M. Geldert (X)	14,494	
J. Edward McVeigh	11,712	
Fulgence Charpentier (X)	10,350	
John J. Allen	8,639	
Kirby Bangs	8,598	
Harold C. Shipman	8,514	
Thomas Brethour	8,841	
John R. Welch	4,763	
E. A. Bourque	4,319	
Otto G. O'Regan	1,491	
Percy E. Bedford	530	
Alex Leckie	404	
Williams Gibbs	325	
Joseph M. Moran	322	

== Ottawa City Council ==
(2 elected from each ward)

Rideau Ward
Candidate	Votes	%
A. W. Spearman (X)	817	
Shirley S. Slinn	757	
Charles E. Reid	603	
Alex Daudelin	312	
Maxwell J. Smith	101	

By Ward
Candidate	Votes	%
Joseph Albert Parisien (X)	1,599	
A. W. Desjardins (X)	1,589	
James P. Butler	460	
Louis H. Tasse	361	

St. George's Ward
Candidate	Votes	%
Arthur Pinard (X)	1,978	
Norman H. MacDonald (X)	1,764	
Walter Cunningham	1,327	
Arthur A. Moeser	914	
Reginald J. Melbourne	58	

Wellington Ward
Candidate	Votes	%
James W. McNabb (X)	2,433	
Martin M. Walsh (X)	2,420	
Henry Bradley	1,276	
Ernest A. Wright	507	

Capital Ward
Candidate	Votes	%
Edward Band (X)	2,796	
Harold D. Marshall (X)	2,542	
Cecil Elbourne	403	

Dalhousie Ward
Candidate	Votes	%
Daniel McCann (X)	2,263	
Wilbert Hamilton	1,579	
James J. McVeigh (X)	1,541	
R. E. Brule	868	
Robert W. Porteous	354	

Elmdale Ward
Candidate	Votes	%
William H. Marsden (X)	1,839	
Jim Forward (X)	1,472	
George P. Seeley	656	
Thomas Rale	608	

Victoria Ward
Candidate	Votes	%
Nelson J. Lacasse (X)	1,369	
Joseph P. Nolan (X)	697	
James E. H. Langdon	676	
John A. O'Connor	515	
Joseph A. Barrett	472	
Dolphis Bonenfant	224	
Bernard Devine	219	
Arthur Clement	183	
Romuald Tessier	178	
Frank T. Sawrer	139	

Ottawa Ward
Candidate	Votes	%
Aristide Belanger (X)	1,847	
Napoleon Bordeleau (X)	1,553	
Joseph Landriault	971	

Riverdale Ward
Candidate	Votes	%
David McMillan (X)	1,996	
George Sloan (X)	1,864	
Robert L. Haggart	363	

Central Ward
Candidate	Votes	%
Finley McRae	1,809	
Allan B. Turner	1,451	
Fred Jounreaux	1,440	
Eric S. Hind	1,127	
John A. MacDonald	450	
P. Alexander Cray	66	
Herbert Sleaco	30	
