= 1923 Ottawa municipal election =

The city of Ottawa, Canada held municipal elections on January 1, 1923, to elect members of the 1923 Ottawa City Council.

== Mayor of Ottawa ==
Candidate	Votes	%
Frank H. Plant	Acclaimed	

== Plebiscites ==
Municipal ownership of the Ottawa Street Railway (property holders)
Option	Votes	%
Against	3,569	50.04
For	3,563	49.96

Daylight saving time
Option	Votes	%
For	7,966	55.00
Against	6,518	45.00

Service at cost agreement
Option	Votes	%
Against	9,288	65.31
For	4,933	34.69

$50,000 bylaw for playgrounds
Option	Votes	%
Against	4,245	59.67
For	2,869	40.33

Abattoir bylaw to raise $75,000
Option	Votes	%
Against	4,886	67.46
For	2,357	32.54

== Ottawa Board of Control ==
(4 elected)

Candidate	Votes	%
John P. Balharrie	6,894	16.16
John Cameron	6,786	15.91
Arthur Ellis	6,775	15.88
Joseph McGuire	6,263	14.68
Napoléon Champagne	6,097	14.29
Charles J. Tulley	4,268	10.01
Thomas Brethour	4,021	9.43
J. W. Hinchcliffe	1,553	3.64

== Ottawa City Council ==
(2 elected from each ward)

Rideau Ward
Candidate	Votes	%
S. Rupert Broadfoot	Acclaimed	
D. H. Macdonald	Acclaimed	

By Ward
Candidate	Votes	%
Edward Gaulin	619	34.26
Fred Desjardins	596	32.98
Eric Query	592	32.76

St. George Ward
Candidate	Votes	%
W. J. McCaffrey	996	33.69
Walter Cunningham	987	33.39
Leslie P. Whyte	538	18.20
Kealey	435	14.72

Wellington Ward
Candidate	Votes	%
James W. McNabb	1,367	43.41
Erenest D. Lowe	1,188	37.73
E. W. Marshall	594	18.86

Capital Ward
Candidate	Votes	%
H. H. McElroy	Acclaimed	
T. H. Brewer	Acclaimed	

Dalhousie Ward
Candidate	Votes	%
J. A. Forward	1,507	30.96
Fred Hunt	1,261	25.90
W. E. O'Meara	1,172	24.08
Harry Lowe	501	10.29
Porteous	427	8.77

Victoria Ward
Candidate	Votes	%
Patrick Nolan	986	40.66
Ernest Laroche	813	33.53
Gerald Sims	626	25.81

Ottawa Ward
Candidate	Votes	%
Napoleon Bordeleau	820	37.02
Telmond St. Denis	714	32.23
Guertin	681	30.74

Central Ward
Candidate	Votes	%
William R. Low	915	27.84
C. Allen Snowdon	821	24.98
Barber	810	24.64
Hamilton	741	22.54
