= 1937 Ottawa municipal election =

The city of Ottawa, Canada held municipal elections on December 6, 1937.

== Mayor of Ottawa ==
| Candidate | Votes | % |
|---|---|---|
| J. E. Stanley Lewis (X) | 18,186 | 58.57 |
| William H. Marsden | 12,255 | 39.47 |
| Caleb Green | 324 | 1.04 |
| William Watson | 284 | 0.91 |

== Ottawa Board of Control ==
(4 elected)

| Candidate | Votes | % |
|---|---|---|
| G. M. Geldert (X) | 14,915 | |
| E. A. Bourque (X) | 11,534 | |
| J. Edward McVeigh | 11,257 | |
| Finley McRae (X) | 10,612* | |
| J. H. Putman | 10,612* | |
| Thomas Brethour | 9,960 | |
| Allan B. Turner | 9,384 | |
| P. J. Nolan | 5,191 | |
| Percy Bedford | 1,261 | |
| Joseph McHugh | 825 | |
| William C. Gibbs | 429 | |
| Charles E. M. Goulden | 314 | |

* The city clerk cast the deciding vote for McRae.

== Ottawa City Council ==
(2 elected from each ward)

Rideau Ward
| Candidate | Votes | % |
|---|---|---|
| John Powers (X) | 808 | |
| Fred Goodhouse (X) | 702 | |
| A. W. Spearman | 626 | |
| Wilfrid D. Girard | 414 | |

By Ward
| Candidate | Votes | % |
|---|---|---|
| J. Albert Parisien (X) | 1,339 | |
| Eric Query (X) | 1,175 | |
| James Butler | 646 | |

St. George's Ward
| Candidate | Votes | % |
|---|---|---|
| Arthur Pinard (X) | 1,870 | |
| Harold Taylor | 1,759 | |
| Arthur A. Moeser | 1,197 | |

Wellington Ward
| Candidate | Votes | % |
|---|---|---|
| Arthur J. Ash (X) | 1,684 | |
| Martin M. Walsh | 1,644 | |
| Omar G. Armstrong | 1,053 | |
| Charles Parker | 776 | |
| Albert Gamble | 476 | |
| Robert Burnett | 469 | |
| E. S. Green | 202 | |
| J. Albert Schryburt | 133 | |

Capital Ward
| Candidate | Votes | % |
|---|---|---|
| Edward Band (X) | Acclaimed | |
| Harold D. Marshall (X) | Acclaimed | |

Dalhousie Ward
| Candidate | Votes | % |
|---|---|---|
| Daniel McCann (X) | 2,095 | 37.47 |
| Wilbert Hamilton (X) | 1,696 | 30.33 |
| Richard W. Dawson | 828 | 14.81 |
| J. R. Sands | 638 | 11.41 |
| Joseph Raymond | 334 | 5.97 |

Elmdale Ward
| Candidate | Votes | % |
|---|---|---|
| Jim Forward (X) | 1,390 | |
| George Pingle | 1,236 | |
| Henry Bradley | 809 | |
| Cecil D. Morris | 745 | |
| Harry Low | 622 | |
| D. R. Grant | 448 | |
| H. J. Oliver | 388 | |

Victoria Ward
| Candidate | Votes | % |
|---|---|---|
| Joseph P. Nolan (X) | 1,330 | |
| Joseph Allard | 936 | |
| Nelson J. Lacasse | 926 | |
| Dolphis Bonnenfant | 403 | |

Ottawa Ward
| Candidate | Votes | % |
|---|---|---|
| Aristide Belanger (X) | 1,628 | |
| Napoleon Bordeleau | 1,413 | |
| A. E. Beauchamp (X) | 1,155 | |

Riverdale Ward
| Candidate | Votes | % |
|---|---|---|
| David McMillan (X) | Acclaimed | |
| George Sloan (X) | Acclaimed | |

Central Ward
| Candidate | Votes | % |
|---|---|---|
| Fred Journeaux (X) | 1,586 | |
| George F. Perley | 1,457 | |
| J. Grant Shaw | 1,011 | |
| Harold C. Shipman | 738 | |
| J. J. Enright | 381 | |
| Otto G. O'Regan | 190 | |
