= Capital Ward =

Capital
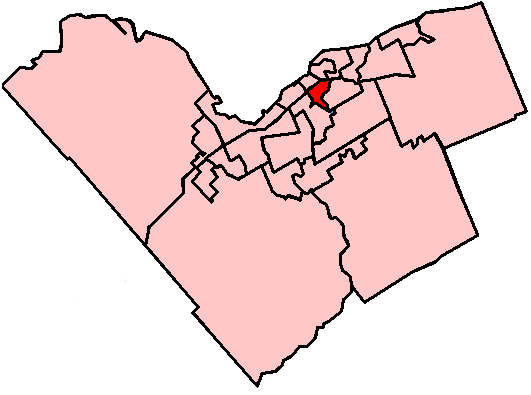
- Location within Ottawa
- Coordinates: 45°24′N 75°41′W
- Country: Canada
- Province: Ontario
- City: Ottawa

Government
  - Councillor: Shawn Menard

Area
  - Total: 10.0 km^{2} (3.9 sq mi)

Population (2016)Canada 2016 Census
  - Total: 34,210
  - Density: 3,420/km^{2} (8,860/sq mi)

Languages (2016)
  - English: 70.7%
  - French: 10.9%
  - Mandarin: 3.6%
  - Arabic: 2.7%
  - Spanish: 1.3%
  - German: 1.1%
  - Italian: 1.1%
- Avg. income: $51,601

Capital Ward or Ward 17 (French: Quartier Capitale) is a city ward located in the centre of Ottawa, Ontario. Situated just south of downtown Ottawa, the ward includes the communities of Old Ottawa East, Old Ottawa South, the Glebe, Heron Park, Carleton University, and Riverside

Out of all the wards currently in existence, Capital ward has existed the longest. It was originally created in 1909 from parts of Wellington Ward and Central Ward when the Glebe was settled. The original capital ward consisted solely of the Glebe. It eventually annexed Old Ottawa South before assuming its current borders.

Its first aldermen were John Carnochan and J. W. Nelson.

== Councillors ==
Council	Aldermen	
1910	John Carnochan	J. W. Nelson
1911	John Carnochan	J. W. Nelson
1912	Arthur W. Ault	J. W. Nelson
1913	Arthur W. Ault	John Carnochan
1914	W. N. Graham	John Carnochan
1915	James Muir	John Carnochan
1916	James Muir	Thomas R. Browne
1917	Frank H. Plant	Thomas R. Browne
1918	Frank H. Plant	Arthur R. Ford
1919	William Y. Denison	Arthur R. Ford
1920	William Y. Denison	Arthur R. Ford
1921	Herbert H. McElroy	J. J. Slattery
1922	Herbert H. McElroy	T. H. Brewer
1923	Herbert H. McElroy	T. H. Brewer
1924	Harold D. McCormick	McGregor Easson
1925	Harold D. McCormick	McGregor Easson
1926	Harold D. McCormick	McGregor Easson
1927	James Warren York	McGregor Easson
1928	James Warren York	McGregor Easson
1929	James Warren York	George Pushman
1930	James Warren York	Edward Band
1931	Harold D. Marshall	Edward Band
1932	Harold D. Marshall	Edward Band
1933	Harold D. Marshall	Edward Band
1934	Harold D. Marshall	Edward Band
1935	Harold D. Marshall	Edward Band
1936	Harold D. Marshall	Edward Band
1937	Harold D. Marshall	Edward Band
1938	Harold D. Marshall	Edward Band
1939	C. E. Pickering	Edward Band
1940	C. E. Pickering	Edward Band
1941–42	Joseph McCulloch	Edward Band
1943–44	Joseph McCulloch	Edward Band
1945–46	Joseph McCulloch	Edward Band
1947–48	Joseph McCulloch	Edward Band
1949–50	Noel Ogilvie	Edward Band
1951–52	Noel Ogilvie	Parlane Christie
1953–54	Noel Ogilvie	George Sloan
1955–56	Noel Ogilvie	James A. Donaldson
1957–58	Noel Ogilvie	George Sloan
1959–60	Don Armstrong	George Sloan
1961–62	Don Armstrong	Claude Bennett
1963–64	Don Armstrong	Claude Bennett
1965–66	Don Armstrong	Claude Bennett
1967–69	Charlotte Whitton	Claude Bennett
1970–72	Charlotte Whitton	Gary Guzzo
1973–74	Don Lockhart	
1975–76	Don Lockhart	
1977–78	Joe Cassey	
1978–80	Michele Mackinnon	
1980–82	Howard Smith	
1982–85	Howard Smith	
1985–88	Rob Quinn	
1988–91	Lynn Smyth	
1991–94	Jim Watson	
Council	City Councillor	Regional Councillor
1994–97	Jim Watson	Brian McGarry
1997–00	Inez Berg	Clive Doucet
Council	City Councillor	
2001–03	Clive Doucet	
2003–06	Clive Doucet	
2006–10	Clive Doucet	
2010–14	David Chernushenko	
2014–18	David Chernushenko	
2018–22	Shawn Menard	
2022–26	Shawn Menard	
2026–30	Shawn Menard	

== Election results ==
=== 1974 Ottawa municipal election ===
City council
Candidate	Votes	%
Don Lockhart	2,039	28.51
Thom Bennett	1,389	19.42
Lionel Britton	1,306	18.26
Bill Kincaid	1,030	14.40
Wendell Atchison	785	10.98
Jim Wright	387	5.41
Leo Morency	216	3.02

=== 1976 Ottawa municipal election ===
City council
Candidate	Votes	%
Joe Cassey	3,441	47.23
Don Lockhart	1,885	25.87
Thom Bennett	1,812	24.87
Leo Morency	148	2.03

=== 1978 Ottawa municipal election ===
City council
Candidate	Votes	%
Michelle Mackinnon	3,826	46.08
Thom Bennett	2,411	29.04
Dave Hagerman	1,624	19.56
Doug Coupar	329	3.96
Michael John Houlton	113	1.36

=== 1980 Ottawa municipal election ===
City council
Candidate	Votes	%
Howard Smith	3,358	57.03
Dave Haggerman	1,746	29.65
Vince Capogreco	784	13.32

=== 1982 Ottawa municipal election ===
City council
Candidate	Votes	%
Howard Smith	3,150	43.33
Dave Hagerman	2,795	38.35
David Brasset	1,343	18.43

=== 1985 Ottawa municipal election ===
City council
Candidate	Votes	%
Rob Quinn	2,612	37.93
David Hagerman	1,880	27.39
Howard Smith	1,603	23.28
Susan Pond	791	11.49

=== 1988 Ottawa municipal election ===
City council
Candidate	Votes	%
Lynn Smyth	3,370	56.16
Rob Quinn	2,631	43.84

=== 1991 Ottawa municipal election ===
City council
Candidate	Votes	%
Jim Watson	4,123	58.40
Lynn Smyth	1,817	25.74
Michael Lynch	638	9.04
Frank De Jong	482	6.83

=== 1994 ===
==== 1994 Ottawa-Carleton Regional Municipality elections ====
Regional council
Candidate	Votes	%
Brian McGarry	5,027	50.49
Nancy Mitchell	4,660	46.81
Beatrice Costisella	269	2.70

==== 1994 Ottawa municipal election ====
City council
Candidate	Votes	%
Jim Watson	8,851	89.18
Jim Carson	1,074	10.82

=== 1997 ===
==== 1997 Ottawa-Carleton Regional Municipality elections ====
Regional council
Candidate	Votes	%
Clive Doucet	2,987	36.80
Jim Kennelly	2,054	25.30
Robin Quinn	1,573	19.38
Ed Barter	1,002	12.34
David McNicoll	501	6.17

==== 1997 Ottawa municipal election ====
City council
Candidate	Votes	%
Inez Berg	3,843	46.85
Colin McSweeney	1,660	20.24
Domenic Santaguida	1,136	13.85
Craig Watson	521	6.35
Chris Jalkotzy	511	6.23
Tim Porter	336	4.10
Jaine Marulanda	196	2.39

=== 2000 Ottawa municipal election ===
City council
Candidate	Votes	%
Clive Doucet	6,486	69.51
Jim Bickford	2,845	30.49

=== 2003 Ottawa municipal election ===
City council
Candidate	Votes	%
Clive Doucet	5,785	80.06
C.R.L. Erickson	1,024	14.17
Mike Salmon	417	5.77

=== 2006 Ottawa municipal election ===
City council
Candidate	Votes	%
Clive Doucet	6,495	48.14
Jay Nordenstrom	4,602	34.11
Ian Boyd	1,963	14.55
Sean Curran	433	3.21

=== 2010 Ottawa municipal election ===
Former Green Party deputy leader defeated Liberal Party staffer Isabel Metcalfe and activist Bob Brocklebank. Chernushenko won in the Glebe, Old Ottawa South and Old Ottawa East, Metcalfe won the Riverside apartments and Heron Park while Brocklebank won Carleton University.

City council
Candidate	Votes	%
David Chernushenko	5,335	41.34
Isabel Metcalfe	2,515	19.49
Bob Brocklebank	2,207	17.10
Domenic Santaguida	1,475	11.43
Eugene Haslam	1,084	8.40
Ron Le Blanc	243	1.88
Mano Hadavand	46	0.36

=== 2014 Ottawa municipal election ===
City council
Candidate	Vote	%
David Chernushenko	7,206	77.35
Scott Blurton	1,788	19.19
Espoir Manirambona	322	3.46

Ottawa mayor (Ward results)
Candidate	Vote	%
Jim Watson	7,743	84.14
Mike Maguire	998	10.85
Anwar Syed	142	1.54
Rebecca Pyrah	140	1.52
Bernard Couchman	53	0.58
Darren W. Wood	49	0.53
Michael St. Arnaud	41	0.45
Robert White	36	0.39

=== 2018 Ottawa municipal election ===
City council	Vote	%
Shawn Menard	3,575	28.12
Christine McAllister	3,198	25.15
David Chernushenko	2,970	23.36
Anthony Carricato	2,451	19.28
Jide Afolabi	520	4.09

=== 2022 Ottawa municipal election ===
City council	Vote	%
Shawn Menard	11,358	78.81
Rebecca Bromwich	1,986	13.78
Daniel Rogers	1,068	7.41

=== 2026 Ottawa municipal election ===
2026 Ottawa municipal election: Capital
Candidate	Popular vote			Expenditures
Candidate	Votes	%	±%	Expenditures
Shawn Menard (X)	12,146	87.73		
Farah Gulzar	953	6.88		
Jaac Doduck	746	5.39		
Total valid votes	14,398			
Total rejected, unmarked and declined votes				
Turnout		44.10		
Eligible voters	32,652			
Note: Candidate campaign colours are based on the prominent colour used in campaign items (signs, literature, etc.) and are used as a visual differentiation between candidates.
