= Jim Watson (Canadian politician) =

59th mayor of Ottawa

The Honourable Jim Watson ECO
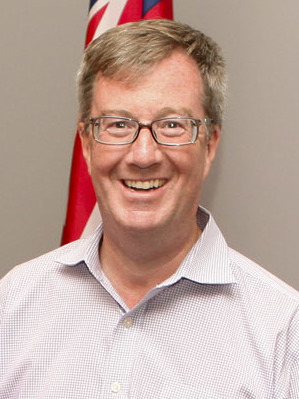
- Watson in 2013

56th Mayor of Ottawa
- In office December 1, 2010 – November 15, 2022
- Preceded by: Larry O'Brien
- Succeeded by: Mark Sutcliffe
- In office December 1, 1997 – August 13, 2000
- Preceded by: Jacquelin Holzman
- Succeeded by: Allan Higdon (interim)

Member of Provincial Parliament for Ottawa West—Nepean
- In office October 2, 2003 – February 1, 2010
- Preceded by: Garry Guzzo
- Succeeded by: Bob Chiarelli

Minister of Municipal Affairs and Housing
- In office October 30, 2007 – January 12, 2010
- Premier: Dalton McGuinty
- Preceded by: John Gerretsen
- Succeeded by: John Gerretsen

Ottawa City Councillor
- In office 1991–1997
- Preceded by: Lynn Smyth
- Succeeded by: Inez Berg
- Constituency: Capital Ward

More...

Personal details
- Born: James Alexander Watson; July 30, 1961 (age 65) Montreal, Quebec, Canada
- Party: Independent
- Other political affiliations: Ontario Liberal (2003–2010)
- Occupation: Politician; reporter

James Alexander Watson (born July 30, 1961) is a Canadian politician who served as the 56th mayor of Ottawa from 2010 to 2022. Previously, he served as an Ottawa city councillor from 1991 to 1997, and as mayor from 1997 to 2000.

Watson subsequently represented the riding of Ottawa West—Nepean in the Legislative Assembly of Ontario from 2003 to 2010. He served in the Cabinet of Premier Dalton McGuinty in the portfolios of Consumer and Business Services (2003–2005), Health Promotion (2005–2007), and Municipal Affairs and Housing (2007–2010). He resigned in January 2010 to run for mayor in the 2010 Ottawa municipal election. He was re-elected mayor in 2014 and in 2018. On March 20, 2021, Watson became the longest serving mayor in the city's history, surpassing Stanley Lewis who held office from 1936 to 1948.

== Early life ==
Watson was born on July 30, 1961, in Montreal, Quebec as the second child to Frances (née Murdoch) and Beverley "Bev" Watson. He grew up in Lachute, but his family moved a few times during his childhood for his father's work, taking him to Beaconsfield, Thornhill, and Sarnia. He graduated from high school from Northern Collegiate in Sarnia. Watson later moved to Ottawa to attend Carleton University and graduated in 1983 with a Bachelor of Arts in Mass Communications from the Faculty of Public Affairs. He first got involved in the political sphere during his second year of studies in 1982, when he served as the President of the Rideau River Residence Association (RRRA). Watson began his career working in journalism for a few local newspapers, and later entered the federal public service, where he rose to the position of Director of Communications for the Speaker of the House of Commons.

== Municipal politics in Ottawa ==
=== City Council ===
Watson first entered public office in 1991 when he was elected to pre-amalgamation Ottawa's City Council as councillor for Capital Ward. He was subsequently re-elected to Council in 1994. In 1992 Watson championed a roll-back of salaries and operating costs at the city level. His first direct action against excessive city spending was his unilateral decision to donate his yearly 2% salary increase, totalling $700, to charity. In addition, as part of the re-election process Watson donated his severance pay of $5200 to four local charities after moving from Regional to City Council in 1994. During his second term as councillor, Watson reduced his own salary by 13% from $51,000 to $45,000 while voting to reduce the mayor's office budget and salary. In 1996, he supported Dalton McGuinty's bid to lead the Ontario Liberal party, though at the time he still considered himself a "Red Tory", dating back from his university days when he was a member of the Progressive Conservatives.

=== First mayoral term (pre-amalgamation) ===
In 1997, Watson sought election as Mayor of Ottawa, winning 83 per cent of the popular vote to become Ottawa's youngest-ever mayor at age 36. During his term as mayor, Watson's emphasis centred on ensuring that the City adopt sustainable fiscal management policies which would enable overall operating costs to go down while reducing budget deficits and the city's debt burden. In conjunction, Watson managed to freeze property tax rates for two consecutive years. He also championed a plan with two other councillors, Peter Hume and John O'Neil, to save the historic Aberdeen Pavilion from being torn down.

== After municipal politics ==
Watson resigned as mayor on August 14, 2000 to become president and CEO of the Canadian Tourism Commission. During his time with the federal crown corporation, Watson secured additional funding for the industry following the 2001 crisis of the 9/11 attacks and the softening of the global tourism industry.

In 2003, Watson left public service to pursue a career in media as host of CHRO-TV's The New RO @ Noon. He was also a regular contributor to the Ottawa radio station CFRA and the Ottawa Citizen.

Watson has served on the board or as honorary chair of several community organizations including the Riverside Hospital, the National Arts Centre, the Central Canada Exhibition Association, the Christmas Exchange of Ottawa and the Forum for Young Canadians. He served as chair of the United Way's 2002 campaign, which raised a record $21 million.

== Provincial politics ==
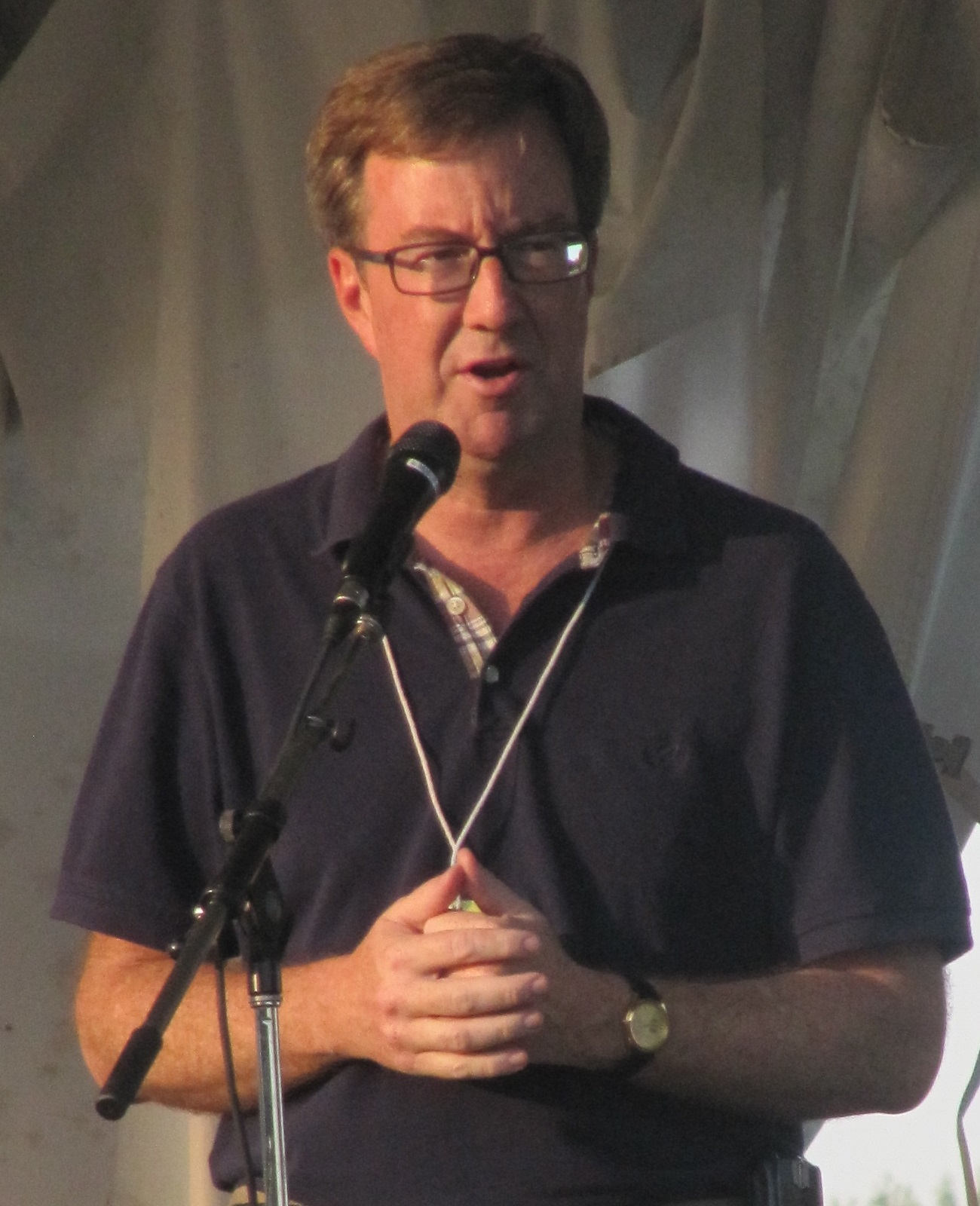
MPP Jim Watson speaking at the 2009 Ottawa Folk Festival

In the 2003 provincial election, Watson defeated Progressive Conservative Party of Ontario incumbent Garry Guzzo to become the Member of Provincial Parliament (MPP) for the Ottawa West-Nepean riding and was appointed by Premier of Ontario Dalton McGuinty as Minister of Consumer and Business Services on October 23, 2003. He became Ontario's first Minister of Health Promotion on June 29, 2005.

=== Minister of Consumer and Business Services ===
Watson worked alongside the Ontario Provincial Police (OPP) to create a "Fraud Free Calendar" in order to help protect consumers, particularly seniors, from high pressure sales tactics, which often lead to impulse purchases. In the spring of 2004, the Federal and Provincial governments signed a joint service delivery accord, creating a "one stop shop" in many communities for provincial and federal services. This accord later included municipalities, in order to provide many government services in one location, for example Ottawa City Hall. Upon inheriting a massive backlog in birth certificate applications, Watson took action to streamline the delivery process for online applicants. After a cabinet shuffle, Dalton McGuinty and Gerry Phillips implemented a money-back guarantee to individuals who do not receive a birth certificate within 15 days of the online application, which Watson had initiated.

=== Minister of Health Promotion ===
Watson initiated a study designed to help Ontarians quit smoking. STOP – Smoking Treatment for Ontario Patients – offered free nicotine replacement therapy to 14,000 smokers across the province. On May 31, 2006, the Smoke-Free Ontario Act came into effect, banning all smoking in public areas in the province, including in restaurants, bars, casinos, etc. Watson was recognized for its implementation. In June of that year, Watson unveiled a $10-million Healthy Eating and Active Living Plan. The plan took aim at childhood obesity, which included a pilot project in Northern schools, offering fruits and vegetables to the students and a program that looked to develop and improve safe biking and walking to and from schools. In 2006, the Ontario government launched a project which provided financial assistance to Ontario athletes looking to perform at the national and international levels. Quest For Gold is now part of the Ontario Athlete Assistance Program (OAAP), funded by the Government of Ontario, through the Ministry of Tourism, Culture & Sport. The Program provided direct financial assistance to Ontario athletes through an "Ontario Card" designation. The intent of the OAAP is to provide funding to individual athletes based on their demonstrated commitment to high performance sport, allowing them to pursue athletic excellence at the highest levels of national and international competition.

=== Minister of Municipal Affairs ===
After the 2007 election, Watson became Minister of Municipal Affairs and Housing. During his tenure as Queen's Park's official liaison with Ontario's municipalities, Watson was able to implement substantive policies to alleviate fiscal pressure on cities. In February 2008, Watson brought forward the Rental Opportunity for Ontario Families (ROOF) program that helps low-income families with funds to pay rent over a five-year period. In October of that year, a policy designed to support the uploading of property tax supported programs from the budgets of Ontario's municipalities to that of the Provincial budget was implemented. Under this policy, the province took back $1.5 billion worth of programs funded by Ontario's municipalities, reversing previous downloading of provincial responsibilities which occurred during Mike Harris' tenure as premier. The provincial government assumed responsibility for Ontario Works social assistance services, paramedic services, public health, transit, drug benefit programs, the Ontario Disability Support Program, court services, and property tax assessment. In addition, Watson signed the Federal-Provincial Housing Agreement in 2008, the largest housing agreement of its kind to date.

=== Summary of Cabinet Portfolios ===
McGuinty ministry, Province of Ontario (2003–2013)
Cabinet posts (3)
Predecessor	Office	Successor
John Gerretsen	Minister of Municipal Affairs and Housing; October 30, 2007 – January 12, 2010	John Gerretsen
New position	Minister of Health Promotion; June 29, 2005 – October 30, 2007	Margarett Best
Tim Hudak	Minister of Consumer and Business Services; October 23, 2003 – June 29, 2005	Gerry Phillips

== Second mayoral term (New City of Ottawa) ==
On January 12, 2010, Watson resigned from cabinet in order to run for mayor of Ottawa in the 2010 Ottawa municipal election. Watson won the election with almost 50% of the vote.

Upon taking office, Watson froze his own salary and cut his office budget by 10%. As mayor, he committed to limit tax increases to no more than 2.5%, and did so, bringing in the lowest rates in a number of years. He also enacted a set of integrity and transparency measures, including hiring an integrity commissioner, launching a lobbyist registry and requiring that elected officials' office expenses be posted online. He also froze community recreation fees for four years, and reduced the size of the city's workforce twice, the first time it had been done since amalgamation.

Watson and the Ottawa City Council also invested $340 million in infrastructure renewal projects such as roads, sidewalks, pathways and sewers and record amount in cycling initiatives. Watson helped advance two major city-building projects that had stalled for a number of years: the revitalization of Lansdowne Park and the introduction of light rail transit. In October 2012, the city council approved the final Lansdowne Park plan, an agreement with the Ottawa Sports and Entertainment Group that saw the existing stadium significantly renovated, increased green space, and housing and retail added to the site. In December 2012, City Council voted unanimously to move forward with the Confederation Line, a 12.5 km light rail transit line from Tunney's Pasture in the west to Blair in the east, to be fully operational by 2018.

Watson also helped create Invest Ottawa, the city's economic development agency, whose programs and initiatives increase entrepreneurial momentum, wealth and jobs in Ottawa.

== Third mayoral term ==
Watson won the mayoral race in 2014 with 76.20% of the votes, defeating eight other candidates.

=== International economic trips ===
On November 16, 2015, Watson lead an economic mission to China and Thailand with hopes of promoting Ottawa as a leading innovation hub in Canada, to draw investment for Ottawa businesses, and to encourage tourism to the nation's capital. Watson and fifteen local business leaders began the mission in Beijing, Ottawa's only sister city, where he signed an "Exchange and Co-operation Agreement" with Beijing mayor Guo Jinlong, establishing key common goals in business, trade, and municipal administration. The agreement states the mutual support of local enterprises to invest in each other's cities, as well as enhanced co-operation in the high-tech industry. A year later, on April 17, 2016, Watson led a delegation of 35 leaders in the business and tech industries to generate investment opportunities in technology, education, film production and tourism. In addition to seizing the significant economic growth opportunities in India, the trade mission also afforded the City of Ottawa and Invest Ottawa the opportunity to leverage the experience of many successful, local Indo-Canadian business leaders. The mission's resulting list of Memoranda of Understanding (MOUs), strategic partnerships and mutually beneficial agreements between Ottawa companies and their Indian counterparts has an estimated total value of more than $80 million.

=== Significant projects ===
Since 2014, Watson has led many significant projects in the city. Set to become one of the largest infrastructure projects in the city's history, the city secured more than $1.15 billion from the federal government to help the expansion of the Light Rail Transit (LRT) network of the completed Confederation Line, which will move the public transportation further east, south, and west. Watson pushed to have the Mayors of Ottawa and Gatineau to join the Board of the National Capital Commission (NCC) in 2016. That year, Watson and Gatineau mayor Maxime Pedneaud-Jobin were invited to join as ex-officio, non-voting members.

The city has invested a record $80M since 2014 for cycling and pedestrian structures. City council unanimously approved downtown Ottawa's second segregated bike lane in 2015 and built the 2.5-kilometre north-south cycling spine between Parliament Hill and Lansdowne Park on O'Connor Street. In addition, the NCC worked alongside Watson, as well as Nathalie Des Rosiers and Elizabeth Moore Aubin, to open another segregated cycling lane on Mackenzie Avenue, creating a safer environment for cyclists in the Ottawa region. Watson played a key role in the opening of the Innovation Centre at Bayview Yards, the new home for Invest Ottawa and an entrepreneurial hub for the Ottawa region. It is expected to engage over 1200 businesses within the city, assisting them to grow and develop their products, as well as create over 280 jobs within the capital region. Watson and the City of Ottawa have been working in conjunction to reduce the impact of sewage overflows and storm water on the Ottawa River. The Ottawa River Action Plan (ORAP) is made up of 17 individual projects which aim to enhance the health of the Ottawa River and to protect Ottawa's water environment. Watson supported the arts community towards redeveloping the Arts Court and expanding the Ottawa Art Gallery. The project is part of a vision for the revitalization of the downtown core in Ottawa. The project includes environmentally-controlled exhibition and curatorial spaces, event and education facilities, a café and a gift shop.

=== Ottawa 2017 ===
As Canada celebrated its 150th year since Confederation, the City of Ottawa created a group in charge of putting together a full year of activities and events. The Ottawa 2017 Bureau, under Guy Laflamme, was responsible for organizing signature events throughout the year, attracting millions of visitors to Ottawa to experience them. Over the course of year, the city played host to a number of successful events including the 2017 Red Bull Crashed Ice downhill skating competition, the Juno Awards of 2017; La Machine (production company), a four-day show that attracted over 750,000 people, Ottawa Welcomes the World, a series of celebrations at Lansdowne Park to promote tourism in other countries and strengthen ties with those nations, the 105th Grey Cup at TD Place, and the 2017 NHL 100 Classic, an outdoor game between the Ottawa Senators and the Montreal Canadiens that recreated the first ever NHL game almost 100 years later.

== Fourth mayoral term ==
On October 22, Watson won the 2018 mayoral race with 71.03% of the votes, defeating eleven other candidates.

Watson oversaw the launch of the Confederation Line, a rail system that opened to the public on September 14, 2019. He has also played an instrumental role to open a new central library to the city's downtown core at LeBreton Flats - a state-of-the-art net carbon zero facility. During this term, in an article published in the Ottawa Citizen on August 17, 2019, Watson came out as gay after 40 years of being closeted. From 2018 to 2022, Watson led Ottawa through natural disasters, including two floods, tornados, a global pandemic (COVID-19), and the 2022 Freedom Convoy.

On March 20, 2021, Watson became Ottawa's longest serving mayor, passing J.E. Stanley Lewis' previous record. On December 10, 2021, Watson announced he would not be running for re-election in the upcoming 2022 Ottawa municipal election.

=== 2022 Freedom Convoy protest ===
On Sunday, February 6, 2022, Watson proclaimed a state of emergency to handle a 10-day blockade as part of the Freedom Convoy 2022 that shut down much of the city's core.

=== "The Watson Club" ===
After his re-election, some councillors expressed concern over Watson's apparent stranglehold over several councillors. The urban-suburban split between councillors saw Watson siding with more-suburban and rural councillors, whom he appointed to chair every committee.

== Electoral record ==
=== 2018 ===
2018 Ottawa municipal election - Mayor
Candidate	Votes	%
Jim Watson (x), (*)	188,960	71.03
Clive Doucet	59,156	22.24
Bruce McConville	4360	1.64
Craig MacAulay	2272	0.85
Ahmed Bouragba	1912	0.72
Joey Drouin	1893	0.71
Hamid Alakozai	1867	0.70
James T. Sheahan	1354	0.51
Michael Pastien	1177	0.44
Ryan Lythall	1115	0.42
Moises Schachtler	994	0.37
Bernard Couchman	964	0.36

=== 2014 ===
2014 Ottawa municipal election - Mayor
Candidate	Votes	%
Jim Watson (x), (*)	189,253	76.20
Mike Maguire	46,341	18.66
Anwar Syed	3473	1.40
Rebecca Pyrah	2840	1.14
Robert White	1815	0.73
Darren W. Wood	1764	0.71
Michael St. Arnaud	1628	0.66
Bernard Couchman	1255	0.51

=== 2010 ===
2010 Ottawa municipal election, Mayor
Candidate	Votes	%
Jim Watson (x)	131,323	48.70
Larry O'Brien (*)	64,862	24.06
Clive Doucet	40,148	14.89
Andrew S. Haydon	18,914	7.01
Mike Maguire	6,618	2.45
15 other candidates	7,775	2.88
Total votes	269,640	100.0
Source: "2010 municipal election results". City of Ottawa. Archived from the original on February 19, 2014.

(x): indicates elected.

(*): indicates incumbent.

=== 2007 Ontario provincial election, Ottawa West-Nepean ===
2007 Ontario general election: Ottawa West—Nepean
Party	Candidate	Votes	%	±%	Expenditures
Liberal	Jim Watson	23,842	50.64	+3.60	$ 81,588.12
Progressive Conservative	Mike Patton	14,971	31.80	−9.44	67,155.94
New Democratic	Lynn Hamilton	4,564	9.69	+1.35	15,904.92
Green	Martin Hyde	2,903	6.17	+3.51	1,064.61
Family Coalition	John Pacheco	592	1.26		6,938.62
Independent	Robert Gilles Gauthier	207	0.44	−0.28	Unavailable
Total valid votes/expense limit		47,079	100.0	−4.24	$ 88,988.76
Total rejected ballots		304	0.64	+0.09	
Turnout		47,383	57.51	−4.62	
Eligible voters		82,397		+3.55	
Source(s) "Summary of Valid Votes Cast for Each Candidate – October 10, 2007 General Election" (PDF). "Statistical Summary – General Election 2007" (PDF). Elections Ontario. "2007 Candidate Campaign Returns (CR-1)".

=== 2003 Ontario provincial election, Ottawa West-Nepean ===
2003 Ontario general election: Ottawa West—Nepean
Party	Candidate	Votes	%	±%	Expenditures
Liberal	Jim Watson	23,127	47.04	+12.68	$ 67,833.00
Progressive Conservative	Garry Guzzo	20,277	41.24	−6.55	60,734.31
New Democratic	Marlene Rivier	4,099	8.34	−7.78	17,396.47
Green	Neil Adair	1,309	2.66	+1.71	2,684.09
Independent	Robert G. Gauthier	353	0.72		Unavailable
Total valid votes/expense limit		49,165	100.0	+2.90	$ 76,392.96
Total rejected ballots		272	0.55	−0.27	
Turnout		49,437	62.13	+3.24	
Eligible voters		79,576		−2.72	
Source(s) "General Election of October 2, 2003 – Summary of Valid Ballots by Candidate". Elections Ontario. "General Election of October 2, 2003 – Statistical Summary". "2003 Candidate and Constituency Associations – Candidate Campaign Return (CR-1)".

=== 1997 Ottawa municipal election, Mayor ===
1997 Ottawa municipal election, Mayor
Candidate	Votes	%
Jim Watson	54,148	81.56
Robert G. Gauthier	8,037	12.11
Alexander Saikaley	4,209	6.34
Total votes	66,394	100.0

=== 1994 Ottawa municipal election, Capital Ward ===
Candidate	Votes	%
Jim Watson (X)	8,851	89.18
Jim Carson	1074	10.82

=== 1991 Ottawa municipal election, Capital Ward ===
1991 Municipal Election (Capital Ward)
Candidate	Votes
Jim Watson	4,123
Lynn Smyth (X)	1,817
Michael Lynch	638
Frank De Jong	482
