= Henry Watters =

Canadian politician

38th Mayor of Ottawa
- In office 1924–1924
- Preceded by: Frank H. Plant
- Succeeded by: Napoléon Champagne

Personal details
- Born: June 1, 1853 Bytown
- Died: May 10, 1924 (aged 70) Ottawa

Henry Watters (June 1, 1853 – May 10, 1924) was mayor of the city of Ottawa in 1924.

He was born in Bytown in 1853. He worked as a clerk in a drug store, studied to become a pharmacist and opened his own drug store. He was a founding member of the Canadian Pharmaceutical Association. He was president of the local Liberal association. When a new city pool, now known as the Champagne Bath, was officially dedicated in May 1924, Watters was supposed to officiate, but died of a heart attack on the way to the ceremony. So, Napoléon Champagne, then the city comptroller, dedicated the pool a few days later. Champagne assumed the role of mayor for the remainder of the year.
