= Charles Hopewell =

Canadian politician

32nd Mayor of Ottawa
- In office 1909–1912
- Preceded by: Napoléon Champagne
- Succeeded by: Edward H. Hinchey

Personal details
- Born: September 22, 1861 March Township
- Died: May 15, 1931 (aged 69) Ottawa

Charles Hopewell (September 22, 1861 – May 15, 1931) was mayor of Ottawa from 1909 to 1912.

He was born in March Township in 1861. During his term in office, he negotiated grants in lieu of taxes with the federal government. He also served as magistrate after his term as mayor. Hopewell served for many years on the board of the Union Mission, a shelter for homeless men.

He drowned in the Ottawa River in 1931, an apparent suicide. He is buried in Beechwood Cemetery.

Hopewell Avenue & Hopewell Avenue Public School in the city was named in honour of this former mayor.

Preceded by Napoléon Champagne	Mayor of Ottawa; 1909–1912	Succeeded by Edward H. Hinchey
