= Rideau River Residence Association =

Student organization at Carleton University

- Abbreviation: RRRA
- Formation: 1968
- Location: Ottawa, Ontario Canada
- Members: 3600+
- President & Chief Executive Officer: Alexis Agyei-Gyamera
- Vice President Administration: Rudra Rawal
- Vice President Programming: Sulena Shrestha
- Colours: Red, White and Black
- Key people: Treasurer: Currently Vacant
- Parent organization: Carleton University
- Staff: 60
- Website: www.rrra.ca
- Formerly called: Carleton University Residence Association

The Rideau River Residence Association (RRRA) is the student organization that represents undergraduate students living in residence at Carleton University in Ottawa, Ontario, Canada. It was founded in 1968 as the Carleton University Residence Association. Following a protracted fight with the university in the mid-1970s, it was renamed in its present form. It is a non-profit corporation that serves as Canada's oldest and largest residence association. Its membership consists of roughly 3,600 undergraduate students enrolled at the university living in residence. With an annual budget of approximately $1.4 million and three executives alongside volunteer staff, RRRA serves as an advocate for residence students and provides a variety of services, events, and programs to its members.

== Services ==
RRRA operates a business (Abstentions convenience store), In the past it has sold Greyhound tickets, manages the Parliament Hill Program, hosts a wide variety of entertainment and educational events, runs a free bikeshare program for students, staff, and faculty; and runs the RRRA office.

== Governance ==
RRRA has three executives and office staff, and 60 residence students who sit on council as floor representatives. The President is responsible for overseeing the financial matters of the association, and formulating a working budget. The Vice President Administration's role is to oversee council and the constitution, administer yearly elections and the Parliament Hill program, while the Vice President Programming is responsible for coordinating sponsorship agreements as well as facilitating student events within the organization.

Students who sit on council vote on important issues, work on improving the residence experience, plan and promote events, sit on several committees, and become an integral part of the organization. There are four committees in RRRA: Financial Review Committee (FRC), Food Services Review Committee (FSRC), Special Events and Community Outreach Committee (SECOC), and Residence Issues Committee (RIC). Residence committees are in place to act as an advisory body to the RRRA council, and to ensure that students are being served well by all campus associations and the university administration. These committees are open to all residence students, and every attending member is allowed to vote.
