= Edward H. Hinchey =

Canadian politician

33rd Mayor of Ottawa
- In office 1912–1912
- Preceded by: Charles Hopewell
- Succeeded by: James A. Ellis

Personal details
- Born: March 7, 1872
- Died: July 14, 1936 (aged 64) Ottawa, Ontario, Canada

Edward H. Hinchey (March 7, 1872 – July 14, 1936) was mayor of Ottawa, Ontario, Canada in 1912.

Hinchey worked in the weights and measures department of the federal government. He was first elected to city council in 1909. He replaced Charles Hopewell as mayor for a short period between June 21 and July 2, 1912.

He died in Ottawa in 1936 when he was hit by a motorist while returning home. He was buried in Beechwood Cemetery.

Preceded by Charles Hopewell	Mayor of Ottawa; 1912	Succeeded by James A. Ellis
