= Harold Fisher (politician) =

Canadian politician

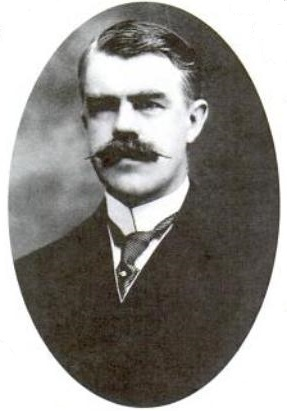
- Harold Fisher

36th Mayor of Ottawa
- In office 1917–1920
- Preceded by: Nelson D. Porter
- Succeeded by: Frank H. Plant
- Incumbent
- Assumed office 1917

Member of Provincial Parliament for Ottawa West
- In office 1923–1926
- Preceded by: Hammett Hill
- Succeeded by: Donald Morrow

Personal details
- Party: Ontario Liberal Party

Harold Fisher, KC (November 1, 1877 – December 19, 1928) was mayor of Ottawa from 1917 to 1920 and a Liberal MPP from 1923 to 1926.

He grew up in Toronto where he attended the Jarvis Collegiate Institute, the University of Toronto, and then got his law degree from Osgoode Hall. He was called to the Ontario bar in 1902. He moved to Ottawa in 1903 and became one of that city's most important lawyers. He was elected as an Alderman in 1913 and became mayor in 1917. As mayor his most important accomplishment was founding the Ottawa Civic hospital. Built in the still largely agricultural area west of the city at a cost of some two million dollars, the hospital project was controversial, but Fisher felt it was important after the city had been devastated by the Spanish flu. In 1920, he became a King's Counsel. In 1923, he was elected to the provincial legislature representing the riding of Ottawa West and was made opposition finance critic with the Liberals. He served on the board of the Civic Hospital from 1924 until his death.

He died of pneumonia in 1928.

Ottawa's Fisher Park High School and Fisher Avenue are both named after him.

Preceded by Nelson D. Porter	Mayor of Ottawa; 1917-1920	Succeeded by Frank H. Plant
