= John J. Allen (Canadian politician) =

Mayor of Ottawa, Canada 1931–1933

John J. Allen (August 2, 1871 – June 7, 1935) was mayor of Ottawa, Ontario, Canada, from 1931 to 1933.

He was born in Dungannon in Huron County, Ontario in 1871. In 1900, he came to Ottawa and opened a drug store; eventually, he and his partner, William Cochrane, sold their business to United Drug Stores, later Rexall. Allen and Cochrane later established a brokerage firm. He served as president of the Rotary Club in the city and later served as district governor. During Allen's term as mayor, he initiated repairs of the city sewer system which helped generate employment during the Great Depression.

Allen died of a heart attack in Montreal in 1935 and was buried in the Beechwood Cemetery.

Preceded by Frank H. Plant	Mayor of Ottawa; 1931–1933	Succeeded by Patrick Nolan (politician)
