= Fulgence Charpentier =

Fulgence Charpentier OC
- Born: June 29, 1897; Sainte-Anne-de-Prescott, Ontario, Canada
- Died: February 6, 2001 (aged 103)
- Occupations: Journalist, editor and publisher
- Children: 6

Fulgence Charpentier, OC (June 29, 1897 – February 6, 2001) was a French Canadian journalist, editor and publisher.

Born in Sainte-Anne-de-Prescott, Ontario, Charpentier's career included diplomatic, political and bureaucratic positions, but his first love had been journalism ever since he began his reporting career at Montreal's Le Devoir in 1915, during which he earned $20 a week.

In 1918, Charpentier joined the Canadian Expeditionary Force, but the war ended before he could be sent overseas. He stayed in the army after the Armistice to work in a military hospital on the campus of McGill University in Montreal.

Charpentier began covering Parliament for Ottawa's Le Droit (the city's largest newspaper) in 1922. He got the job because his father built Le Droit's first offices. The newspaper sent him to law school in Toronto for two academic years before he began his parliamentary reporting.

Charpentier was the longest-serving member of the Parliamentary Press Gallery. His early stories on the then-unilingual English environment of Parliament were believed to be instrumental in getting federal authorities to increase the visibility of French in the Canadian public service. Over the course of his career, Charpentier also wrote for Montreal's La Presse and Quebec City's Le Soleil.

He was also head of the French section of the Canadian Censorship Branch through most of the Second World War, assuming full control of the Censorship Branch in January 1945, when chief censor Wilfrid Eggleston resigned. He was appointed editor-in-chief of Le Droit following his diplomatic career in 1968 at the age of 71.

His resume included serving as a media spokesman for ambassador Georges Vanier in Paris and working as a diplomat from 1946 until 1968 in some francophone African nations and South America. While serving in Africa, Charpentier met Dr. Albert Schweitzer and became an advocate for his work.

Charpentier was still writing weekly columns on his trusty typewriter for Le Droit until 1999, when he had to stop due to chronic bronchial pneumonia at the age of 101. The Canadian Parliamentary Press gallery held a celebration for him shortly after Charpentier's retirement.

In 1978, he was made a Member of the Order of Canada and was promoted to Officer in 1998. He died at age 103 of pneumonia on February 6, 2001.

Charpentier served on the Ottawa Board of Control, and ran for mayor in 1935, but lost.

== See also ==
- Jean Charpentier
