= Napoléon Champagne =

Canadian politician

31st Mayor of Ottawa
- In office 1908–1909
- Preceded by: D'Arcy Scott
- Succeeded by: Charles Hopewell
- Constituency: Ottawa East
- In office 1924–1925
- Preceded by: Henry Watters
- Succeeded by: John P. Balharrie

MLA for Ottawa East
- In office December 11, 1911 – May 29, 1914
- Preceded by: Donald McDougal
- Succeeded by: Joseph Pinard

Personal details
- Born: May 4, 1861 Lower Town, Ottawa
- Died: November 17, 1925 (aged 64) Ottawa
- Party: Conservative Party of Ontario

Napoléon Champagne (May 4, 1861 – November 17, 1925) was mayor of Ottawa, Ontario, Canada in 1908 and 1924, and a member of the Legislative Assembly of Ontario representing Ottawa East from 1911 to 1914.

He was born in Lower Town, Ottawa in 1861, the son of Séraphin Champagne. He studied law in Montreal and was called to the Quebec bar in 1898; he became a member of the Ontario bar in 1901. Champagne served 14 years on Ottawa city council and also served ten years as controller. In 1908, he served as mayor after D'Arcy Scott resigned to serve on the Board of Railway Commissioners. The Champagne Bath, a fitness facility, was named after him. He took over the role of mayor in May 1924 when mayor Henry Watters died while in office. Besides serving in the provincial legislature, he also made several unsuccessful attempts at representing the City of Ottawa federally. Champagne died in Ottawa after suffering a heart attack in 1925 and is buried in the Notre-Dame Cemetery.

His brother Albert served in the Canadian House of Commons.

Preceded by D'Arcy Scott	Mayor of Ottawa; 1908	Succeeded by Charles Hopewell
Preceded by Henry Watters	Mayor of Ottawa; 1924	Succeeded by John P. Balharrie
