= George Harrison Dunbar =

Canadian politician

Ontario MPP
- In office 1937–1959
- Preceded by: Arthur Ellis
- Succeeded by: Irwin Haskett
- Constituency: Ottawa South

Personal details
- Born: April 12, 1878; Richmond, Ontario
- Died: February 28, 1966 (aged 87); Toronto, Ontario
- Political party: Progressive Conservative

George Harrison Dunbar (April 12, 1878 – February 28, 1966) was an Ontario political figure. He represented Ottawa South in the Legislative Assembly of Ontario as a Conservative and then Progressive Conservative member from 1937 to 1959.

== Background ==
He was born in Richmond, Ontario in 1878, the son of Thomas Dunbar, and was educated in Kemptville. In 1892, he married a Miss Coxford. He served as a captain during World War I.

He died in a Toronto hospital on February 28, 1966. The George Dunbar Bridge which crosses the Rideau River near Carleton University in Ottawa was named in his honour.

== Politics ==
Dunbar was controller for the city of Ottawa. He ran for mayor of Ottawa in 1938, but placed third. He served in the provincial cabinet as Minister of Municipal Affairs from 1943 to 1955 and Minister of Reform Institutions from 1946 to 1948; Dunbar was Provincial Secretary and Registrar of Ontario from 1943 to 1946 and from 1955 to 1958.

=== Cabinet positions ===
Ontario provincial government of Leslie Frost
Cabinet posts (3)
Predecessor	Office	Successor
Bill Nickle	Provincial Secretary and Registrar; 1943-1946	Mac Phillips
New position	Minister of Reform Institutions; 1946-1949	William Hamilton
Eric Cross	Minister of Municipal Affairs; 1943-1955	Bill Goodfellow
Ontario provincial government of George A. Drew
Cabinet post (1)
Predecessor	Office	Successor
Harry Nixon	Provincial Secretary and Registrar; 1943-1946	Roland Michener
