= Frank H. Plant =

Canadian politician

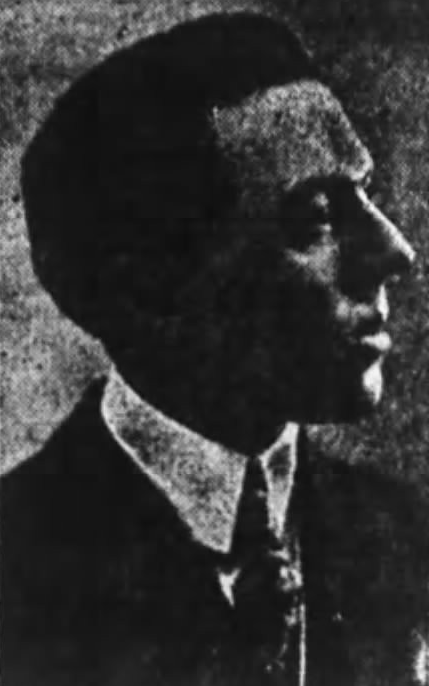

37th Mayor of Ottawa
- In office 1921–1923
- Preceded by: Harold Fisher
- Succeeded by: Henry Watters
- In office 1930–1930
- Preceded by: Arthur Ellis (politician)
- Succeeded by: John J. Allen

Personal details
- Born: November 17, 1883 London, Ontario
- Died: November 7, 1952 (aged 68) Ottawa

Frank Henry Plant (November 17, 1883 – November 7, 1952) was a Canadian businessman and politician. Plant served as mayor of Ottawa from 1921 to 1923 and in 1930. He also served on Ottawa Council from 1917 until 1921 and from 1925 until 1930.

He was born in London, Ontario in 1883 and came to Ottawa with his family in 1900. Plant worked in various accounting jobs during his youth and later got into the investment business. In the 1924 directory, Plant was listed as president of W. H. Plant, Limited, carriage makers on Murray Street.

Plant was first elected in 1917 to Ottawa Council, winning again in 1918, and 1919 on the Board of Control. Plant defeated Joseph Kent by six votes in the 1921 mayoral election, confirmed by a margin of 22 votes in the recount. Plant won in 1922 by 5,000 votes and was acclaimed as mayor in the 1923 election. Plant lost the January 1924 mayoral election to Henry Watters. Plant returned to council as a controller in 1925. Plant remained a controller until 1930, when he was chosen as mayor. Plant left municipal politics in 1930 to run in federal politics, but was defeated in the 1930 federal election in the riding of Ottawa. As an alderman, he helped introduce the "two platoon" system for firefighters in the city. Before that, firefighters were on duty 24 hours per day every day.

Plant served as president of the Ottawa City Hockey League and the City Baseball League during the 1920s. Plant served as a member of the Ottawa Hydro Commission from 1936 until 1951. Plant also served as a director of the Ottawa Senators hockey team, a director of the Ottawa Nationals baseball team, vice-president of the Ottawa Amateur Athletic Association, president of the Ottawa Kennel Club and a long-time (over 20 years) director of the Central Canada Exhibition Association.

The Plant Bath, a recreational facility originally built in 1924, is named after him. The pool, along with Champagne Pool, was personally championed by Plant. A home of Plant's at 170 Clemow Avenue in Ottawa, is a designated heritage structure. It is used today as the High Commission of Cameroon.

Plant died at his home on Clemow Avenue on November 11, 1952. He had spent the previous day at a kennel club meeting and listened to a hockey game on the radio.

== Sources ==
- Mullington, Dave (2005). Chain of Office: Biographic Sketches of Ottawa's Mayors (1847-1948). GeneralStore PublishingHouse.
- Zweig, Eric (2012). Stanley Cup: 120 years of hockey supremacy. Firefly Books. ISBN 978-1-77085-104-7.
