= Joseph Albert Pinard =

Canadian politician

Joseph-Albert Pinard (July 26, 1878 – February 8, 1964) was an Ontario political figure. He represented Ottawa East provincially in the Legislative Assembly of Ontario from 1914 to 1929; as a Liberal until October 1926 and then winning reelection as an Independent-Liberal in the December 1926 election. He represented Ottawa East federally in the House of Commons of Canada from 1936 to 1945 as a Liberal member but was defeated in 1945 and 1949 when he ran as an Independent Liberal.

He was born in Embrun, Ontario, the son of Hercule Pinard and Sophie Bertrand, was educated at Académie De La Salle in Ottawa and became a fire insurance agent in Ottawa. In 1903, he married Parmélia Landreville. He served as a member of Ottawa city council. Pinard ran unsuccessfully for a seat in the House of Commons in 1911. He was first elected to the House of Commons in a 1936 by-election held after Edgar-Rodolphe-Eugène Chevrier was appointed judge. Pinard ran later unsuccessfully as an Independent Liberal in 1945 and 1950. He died in Ottawa at the age of 85.
