= John P. Balharrie =

Canadian politician (1883–1952)

39th Mayor of Ottawa
- In office 1925–1927
- Preceded by: Napoléon Champagne
- Succeeded by: Arthur Ellis

Personal details
- Born: 1883 Ottawa
- Died: April 6, 1952 (aged 68–69) Ottawa
- Party: Conservative

John Paul Balharrie (1883 – April 6, 1952) was mayor of Ottawa from 1925 to 1927.

He was born in Ottawa in 1883 to Scottish immigrants worked in his family's bakery. Balharrie is said to have made his fortune in real estate. He was first elected to city council in 1918, representing Dalhousie Ward. As mayor, Balharrie welcomed Charles Lindbergh to the city after his solo trans-Atlantic flight. After his term as mayor, he served as judge in the juvenile court. He helped support a summer camp at Christie Lake for children from families with limited incomes. He was a prominent member of the Conservative Party.

He died in Ottawa of a heart attack in 1952. He is interred in Pinecrest Cemetery in Ottawa.

| Preceded by Napoléon Champagne | Mayor of Ottawa; 1925-1927 | Succeeded by Arthur Ellis |
