= Patrick Nolan (politician) =

Canadian politician

42nd Mayor of Ottawa
- In office 1934–1935
- Preceded by: John J. Allen
- Succeeded by: J.E. Stanley Lewis

Personal details
- Born: March 17, 1881 Ottawa, Canada
- Died: January 11, 1941 (aged 59) Ottawa, Canada

Patrick J. "Paddy" Nolan (March 17, 1881 – January 11, 1941) was mayor of Ottawa, Canada from 1934 to 1935.

He was born in Ottawa on St. Patrick's Day in 1881, the son of poor Irish parents. He worked as a clerk in a drug store, studied to become a pharmacist and opened his own drug store. He owned several movie theatres in the city.

Nolan was first elected to city council in 1922.

He died of influenza in 1941, aged 59.

Preceded by John J. Allen	Mayor of Ottawa; 1934–1935	Succeeded by J.E. Stanley Lewis
