= Arthur Ellis (Canadian politician) =

Canadian politician

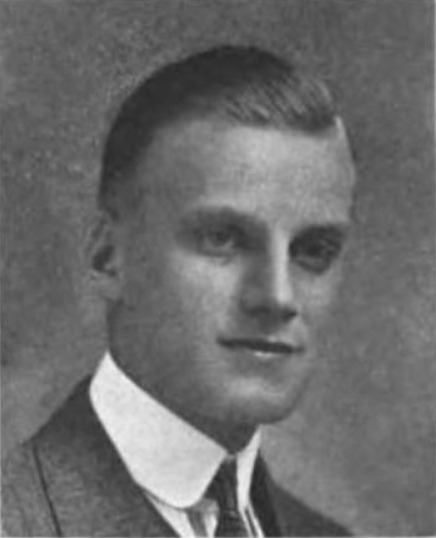

40th Mayor of Ottawa
- In office 1928–1929
- Preceded by: John P. Balharrie
- Succeeded by: Frank H. Plant

Personal details
- Born: February 28, 1890 Ottawa, Ontario
- Died: August 19, 1964 (aged 74) Ottawa, Ontario

Arthur Ellis (February 28, 1890 – October 19, 1964) was a Canadian lawyer and politician. He was mayor of Ottawa from 1928 until 1929.

He was born in Ottawa, the son of Ottawa mayor James A. Dent Ellis. Arthur Ellis studied at Osgoode Hall, was called to the Ontario bar in 1913 and set up practice in Ottawa. He served on the Ottawa school board in 1916 and 1917 before being elected to Ottawa city council where he served as an alderman in 1920 and then on the Board of Control for six years beginning in 1921. After two terms as mayor of Ottawa, he was elected in the 1929 provincial election to the Legislative Assembly of Ontario, representing Ottawa South for the Conservative Party.

He was rumoured to be in line to become Provincial Treasurer but was consigned to the backbench when Joseph Monteith defied pundits by retaining his seat in the legislature in the 1929 election. After the Ontario Liberal Party under Mitchell Hepburn took power in the 1934 provincial election Ellis moved to the Opposition bench where he achieved prominence as finance critic.

On November 25, 1935, he struck and killed a pedestrian on Highway 15 north of Kingston, Ontario and was charged with criminal negligence. He was acquitted in 1936, but the notoriety of the incident hurt his chances as a candidate in the Ontario Conservative leadership convention, held several weeks after the trial, in which he placed seventh with ten votes.

He remained in the legislature until 1937 when he retired from politics.

In 1940, as the result of a separate incident, Ellis was convicted of driving while drunk and sentenced to 30 days in jail. He had been charged after he hit a traffic cop's motorcycle, failed to stop, and hit a parked car following a chase. An open bottle of wine was found in the front seat of Ellis' car.

Preceded by John P. Balharrie	Mayor of Ottawa; 1928-1929	Succeeded by Frank H. Plant
