= Victoria Ward (Ottawa) =

Victoria Ward was one of the original municipal wards in the city of Ottawa, Province of Canada created in 1855 from part of West Ward in Bytown.

Victoria Ward originally consisted of the now uninhabited LeBreton Flats neighbourhood of Ottawa and Parliament Hill. When the city expanded westward, it began to include all of the city north of Wellington Street, encompassing Mechanicsville and parts of Hintonburg. In 1952, it merged with Elmdale Ward to become Elmdale-Victoria Ward.
