= St. George's Ward =

Historical ward in Ontario, Canada

St. George's Ward (also known as St. George Ward) was one of the original five wards of the city of Ottawa, Ontario, Canada created in 1855. out of parts of East Ward and Centre Ward, which existed in Bytown. It existed until 1972 when it merged with By Ward to become By-St. George's Ward. It was recreated in 1980, until it was abolished for a final time in 1994, when it merged with part of By-Rideau Ward to form Bruyère-Strathcona Ward.

For much of its history, St. George's consisted of Ottawa's Sandy Hill neighbourhood. Its second incarnation also consisted of Old Ottawa East.
