= Central Ward =

Central Ward was a former ward in the city of Ottawa, Ontario, Canada. It originally consisted of the part of the city between Bank Street and the Rideau Canal. It was first known as Centre Ward.

It was created when Wellington Ward was split in half in 1889. The ward was abolished in 1952, when it joined neighbouring Wellington Ward once again.
