= Mayor of Ottawa =

Political office

- Municipal logo

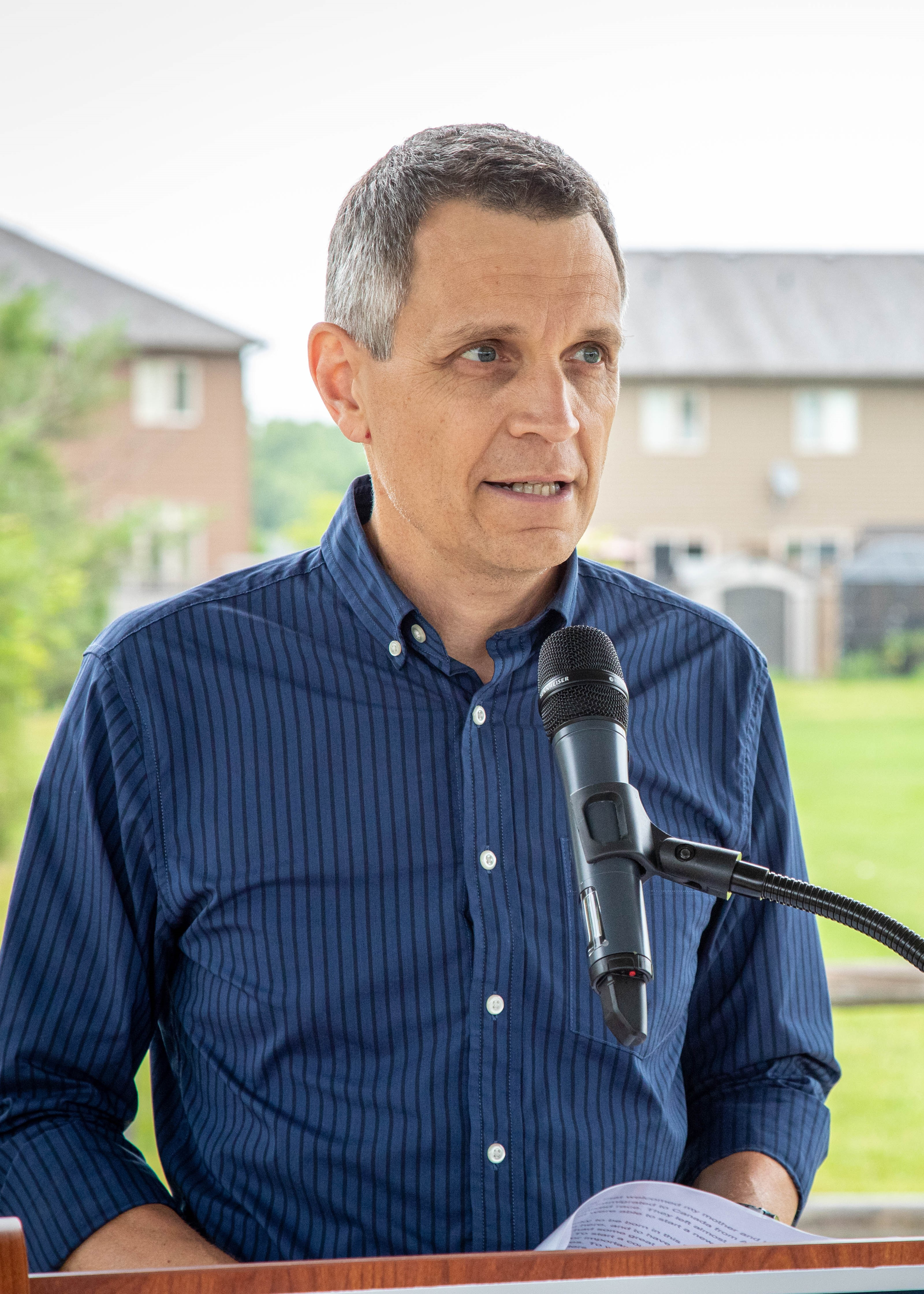
- Incumbent; Mark Sutcliffe since November 15, 2022
- City of Ottawa; Office of the Mayor
- Style: His/Her Worship; Mayor (informal)
- Member of: Ottawa City Council
- Seat: Ottawa City Hall
- Appointer: Direct election
- Term length: Four years; renewable
- Constituting instrument: Municipal Act, 2001; City of Ottawa Act
- Inaugural holder: John Scott (historic); Bob Chiarelli (post-amalgamation)
- Formation: September 11, 1847 (historic); January 1, 2001 (current)
- Salary: CA$198,702
- Website: ottawa.ca/en/city-hall/mayor-and-city-councillors

The mayor of Ottawa (French: maire d'Ottawa) (Note: When the position is held by a woman, the French title is mairesse d'Ottawa.) is head of the executive branch of the Ottawa City Council. The mayor is elected alongside the city council every four years on the fourth Monday of October; there are no term limits. While in office, mayors are styled His/Her Worship.

Mark Sutcliffe has served as the 59th and current mayor of Ottawa since taking office on November 15, 2022, following the 2022 municipal election.

== Role and authority ==
The position of the mayor of Ottawa is set out in the City of Ottawa Act, a provincial statute which was first introduced in 1999, which outlines the mayor's role as head of council. The duties and powers of the Mayor are outlined in Municipal By-law No. 2022-410. In September 2022, the province passed legislation known as the Strong Mayors, Building More Homes Act, 2022, followed by the Better Municipal Governance Act, 2022, both of which expanded the executive power of the mayor.

As head of the council, the mayor ensures business is carried out efficiently during council meetings. Items can be added by the mayor directly to the city council's agenda without going through a committee. The mayor also holds ex officio membership on all council committees. They chair the Finance and Corporate Services Committee and Debenture Committee. The mayor has the power to recommend the chairs of other city committees as well as the deputy mayor, pending final approval from the city council. With the mayor's consent, another council member may take the mayor's place on committees. The head of the council is also responsible for declaring states of emergency in the city.

Certain powers of the mayor can only be exercised to "advance provincial priorities," as outlined in the Better Municipal Governance Act, the Strong Mayors Act and through regulation. While city by-law allows the mayor to add items directly to the council's agenda, this power is expanded by the Strong Mayors Act, which asserts that the mayor can do so to advance a provincial priority, irrespective of the council's procedural by-law. The mayor is also granted a veto, which would allow an override of a city council decision if it is not consistent with a provincial priority; however, the council can override the mayor's veto with a two-thirds majority vote. The Better Municipal Governance Act, which was passed shortly after the Strong Mayors Act further expands this power, allowing the mayor to pass a by-law to advance a provincial priority with one-third support on council. The provincial priorities are set by the Executive Council of Ontario (provincial cabinet), through issuing regulations.

== Deputy mayor ==
Ottawa currently has three Deputy Mayors. The role of Deputy Mayor is outlined in the Municipal By-law No. 2023-11 and the Municipal Act, 2001. As of 2023, the Ottawa City Council has adopted rules, upon the recommendation of 2022–2026 Council Governance Review, which implemented a rotational system where the position of Deputy Mayor would rotate between three different councillors every six months.

Deputy mayor	Term began	Term ended	Constituency as councillor
Shawn Menard	January 1, 2023	June 30, 2023	Capital Ward
Laura Dudas	January 1, 2023	June 30, 2023	Orléans West-Innes Ward
George Darouze	January 1, 2023	June 30, 2023	Osgoode Ward
Theresa Kavanagh	July 1, 2023	December 31, 2023	Bay Ward
Glen Gower	July 1, 2023	December 31, 2023	Stittsville Ward
Clarke Kelly	July 1, 2023	December 31, 2023	West Carleton-March Ward
Riley Brockington	January 1, 2024	June 30, 2024	River Ward
Jessica Bradley	January 1, 2024	June 30, 2024	Gloucester-Southgate Ward
David Hill	January 1, 2024	June 30, 2024	Barrhaven West Ward
Allan Hubley	July 1, 2024	Incumbent	Kanata South Ward
Laine Johnson	July 1, 2024	Incumbent	College Ward
Rawlson King	July 1, 2024	Incumbent	Rideau-Rockcliffe Ward

== Post-amalgamation mayors of Ottawa ==
Over the course of Ottawa's history, the municipality's borders have greatly expanded through annexations. This most recently occurred in 2001 when several neighbouring communities were amalgamated with Ottawa. The following is a list of mayors of the current post-amalgamation Ottawa.

No.	Photo	Mayor	Terms of office	Took office	Left office
57		Bob Chiarelli	2	January 1, 2001	December 1, 2006
58		Larry O'Brien	1	December 1, 2006	November 30, 2010
—		Michel Bellemare (acting)	— (Note: Bellemare and Thompson served as acting mayor during O'Brien's leave of absence, due to criminal charges before the court.)	May 2, 2009	July 8, 2009
—		Doug Thompson (acting)	—	July 8, 2009	August 6, 2009
56 (Note: Watson previously served as mayor of the Old City of Ottawa from 1997 to 2000)		Jim Watson	4	December 1, 2010	November 15, 2022
59		Mark Sutcliffe	1	November 15, 2022	Incumbent

== See also ==
- Ottawa City Council
