= Ottawa City Council =

Governing body of Ottawa, Canada

Ottawa City Council _{Conseil municipal d'Ottawa (French)}
- 2022–2026 term
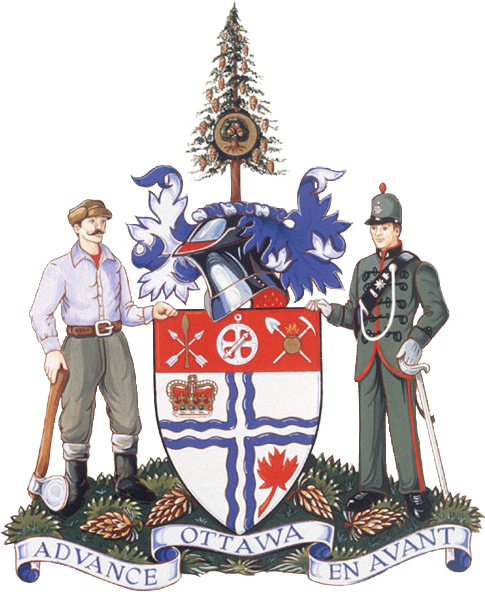
- Coat of arms of Ottawa

Type
- Type: Unicameral city council

History
- Founded: 2001
- New session started: November 15, 2022

Leadership
- Mayor (head of council): Mark Sutcliffe since November 15, 2022
- Deputy Mayors: Clarke Kelly; Glen Gower; Theresa Kavanagh since July 1, 2023

Structure
- Seats: 24 plus the Mayor
- Political groups: Independent (25)
- Length of term: Four years, renewable
- Authority: Municipal Act, 2001; City of Ottawa Act
- Salary: CA$111,111

Elections
- First election: September 11, 1847 (7 seats)
- Last election: October 24, 2022 (25 seats)
- Next election: October 26, 2026 (25 seats)

Meeting place
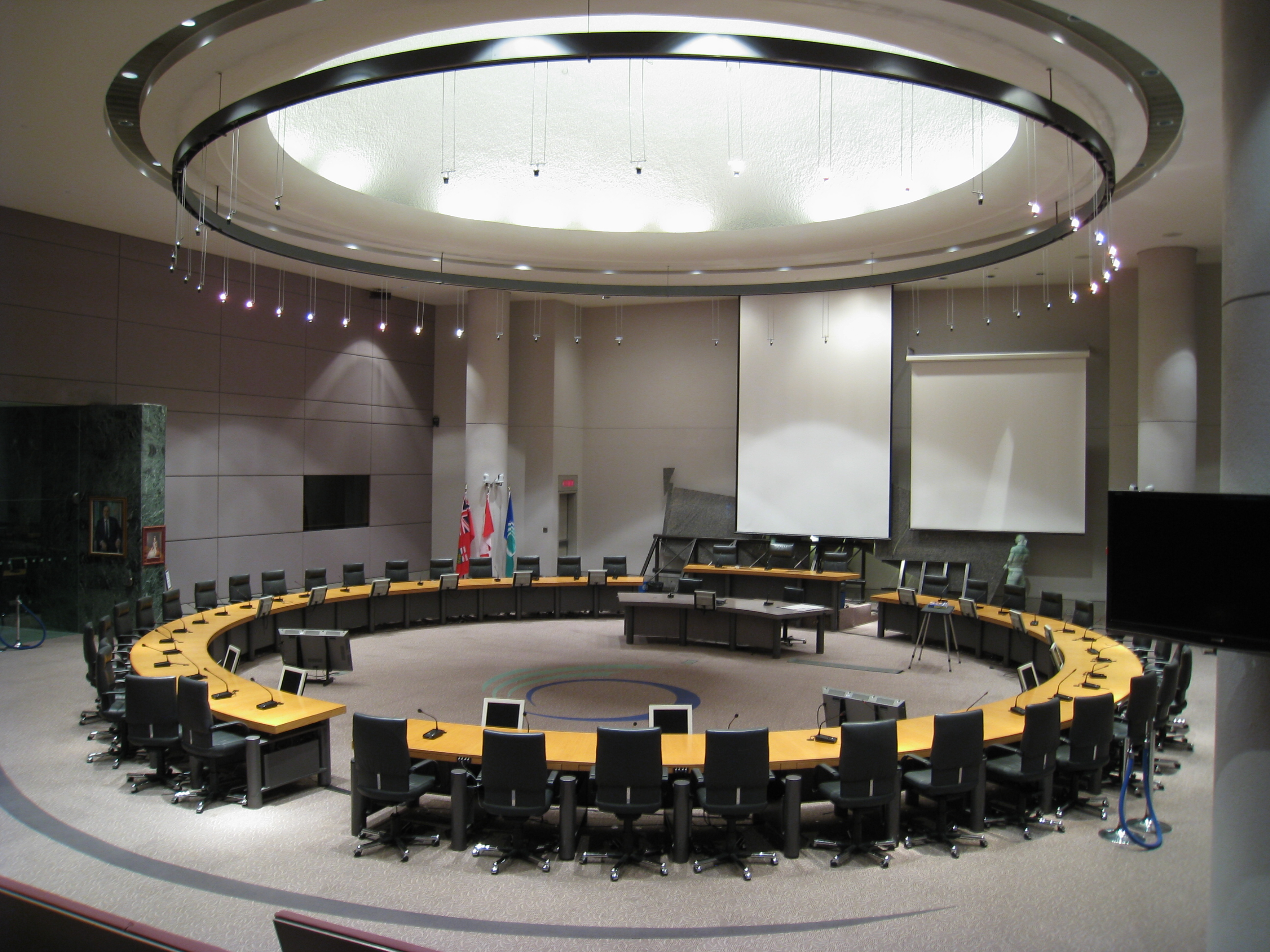
- Andrew S. Haydon Hall; Ottawa City Hall; Ottawa, Ontario

Website
- ottawa.ca/en/city-hall/council-committees-and-boards

Ottawa City Council (French: Conseil municipal d'Ottawa) is the governing body of the City of Ottawa, Ontario, Canada. It is composed of 24 city councillors and the mayor. The mayor is elected at large, while each councillor represents wards throughout the city. Council members are elected to four-year terms, with the last election being on October 24, 2022. The council meets at Ottawa City Hall in downtown Ottawa. Much of the council's work is done in the standing committees made up of sub-groups of councillors. The decisions made in these committees are presented to the full council and voted upon.

== Standing Committees ==
- Agriculture and Rural Affairs Committee
- Audit Committee
- Built Heritage Committee
- Community Services Committee
- Emergency Preparedness and Protective Services Committee
- Environment and Climate Change Committee
- Finance and Corporate Services Committee
- Planning and Housing Committee
- Public Works and Infrastructure Committee
- Transit Committee
- Debenture Committee
- Election Compliance Audit Committee

== Advisory Committees ==
- Accessibility
- Arts, Culture, Heritage and Recreation
- Environmental Stewardship
- French Language Services Services

== Members ==
Map of Ottawa's 24 wards.: 1. Orléans East-Cumberland Ward; 2. Orléans West-Innes Ward; 3. Barrhaven West Ward; 4. Kanata North Ward; 5. West Carleton-March Ward; 6. Stittsville Ward; 7. Bay Ward; 8. College Ward; 9. Knoxdale-Merivale Ward; 10. Gloucester-Southgate Ward; 11. Beacon Hill-Cyrville Ward; 12. Rideau-Vanier Ward; 13. Rideau-Rockcliffe Ward; 14. Somerset Ward; 15. Kitchissippi Ward; 16. River Ward; 17. Capital Ward; 18. Alta Vista Ward; 19. Orléans South-Navan Ward; 20. Osgoode Ward; 21. Rideau-Jock Ward; 22. Riverside South-Findlay Creek Ward; 23. Kanata South Ward.; 24. Barrhaven East Ward.

=== Post-amalgamation ===
Ward	2001-03	2003-06	2006-10	2010-14	2014-18	2018-22	2022-26	2026-30
Mayor	Bob Chiarelli		Larry O'Brien	Jim Watson			Mark Sutcliffe	
Ward 1 (Orléans East-Cumberland) (Orléans Ward, 2001–2022)	Herb Kreling (until Sept. 2005)		Bob Monette (from Jan. 2006)			Matthew Luloff		
Ward 2 (Orléans West-Innes) (Innes Ward, 2001–2022)	Rainer Bloess				Jody Mitic	Laura Dudas		
Ward 3 (Barrhaven West) (Barrhaven Ward, 2001–2022)	Jan Harder						David Hill	
Ward 4 (Kanata North) (Kanata Ward, 2001–2006)	Alex Munter	Peggy Feltmate	Marianne Wilkinson			Jenna Sudds (until Sept. 20, 2021)	Cathy Curry (appointed Nov. 10, 2021)	
Ward 5 (West Carleton-March) (West Carleton Ward, 2001–2006)	Dwight Eastman	Eli El-Chantiry					Clarke Kelly	
Ward 6 (Stittsville) (Goulbourn Ward, 2001–2006)	Janet Stavinga		Shad Qadri			Glen Gower		Chelsea Walton
Ward 7 (Bay)	Alex Cullen			Mark Taylor		Theresa Kavanagh		
Ward 8 (College) (Baseline Ward, 2001–2006)	Rick Chiarelli						Laine Johnson	
Ward 9 (Knoxdale-Merivale)	Gord Hunter			Keith Egli			Sean Devine	
Ward 10 (Gloucester-Southgate)	Diane Deans						Jessica Bradley	
Ward 11 (Beacon Hill-Cyrville)	Michel Bellemare			Tim Tierney				
Ward 12 (Rideau-Vanier)	Madeleine Meilleur (until Oct. 2003)	Georges Bédard		Mathieu Fleury			Stéphanie Plante	
Ward 13 (Rideau-Rockcliffe)	Jacques Legendre			Peter D. Clark	Tobi Nussbaum (until Jan. 2019)		Rawlson King (from Apr. 2019)	
Ward 14 (Somerset)	Elisabeth Arnold	Diane Holmes			Catherine McKenney		Ariel Troster	
Ward 15 (Kitchissippi)	Shawn Little		Christine Leadman	Katherine Hobbs	Jeff Leiper			Joanne Chianello
Ward 16 (River)	Wendy Stewart	Maria McRae			Riley Brockington			
Ward 17 (Capital)	Clive Doucet			David Chernushenko		Shawn Menard		
Ward 18 (Alta Vista)	Peter Hume				Jean Cloutier		Marty Carr	
Ward 19 (Orléans South-Navan) (Cumberland Ward, 2001–2022)	Phil McNeely (until Oct. 2003)	Rob Jellett		Stephen Blais (until Feb. 27, 2020)			Catherine Kitts (from Oct. 6, 2020)	
Ward 20 (Osgoode)	Doug Thompson				George Darouze (until Feb. 27, 2025)			Isabelle Skalski (from June 19, 2025)
Ward 21 (Rideau-Jock) (Rideau-Goulbourn Ward, 2001–2022)	Glenn Brooks			Scott Moffatt			David Brown	
Ward 22 (Riverside South-Findlay Creek) (Gloucester-South Nepean Ward, 2006–2022)	Ward created in 2006		Steve Desroches		Michael Qaqish	Carol Anne Meehan	Steve Desroches	
Ward 23 (Kanata South)	Ward created in 2006		Peggy Feltmate	Allan Hubley				Erin Coffin
Ward 24 (Barrhaven East)	Ward created in 2022						Wilson Lo	

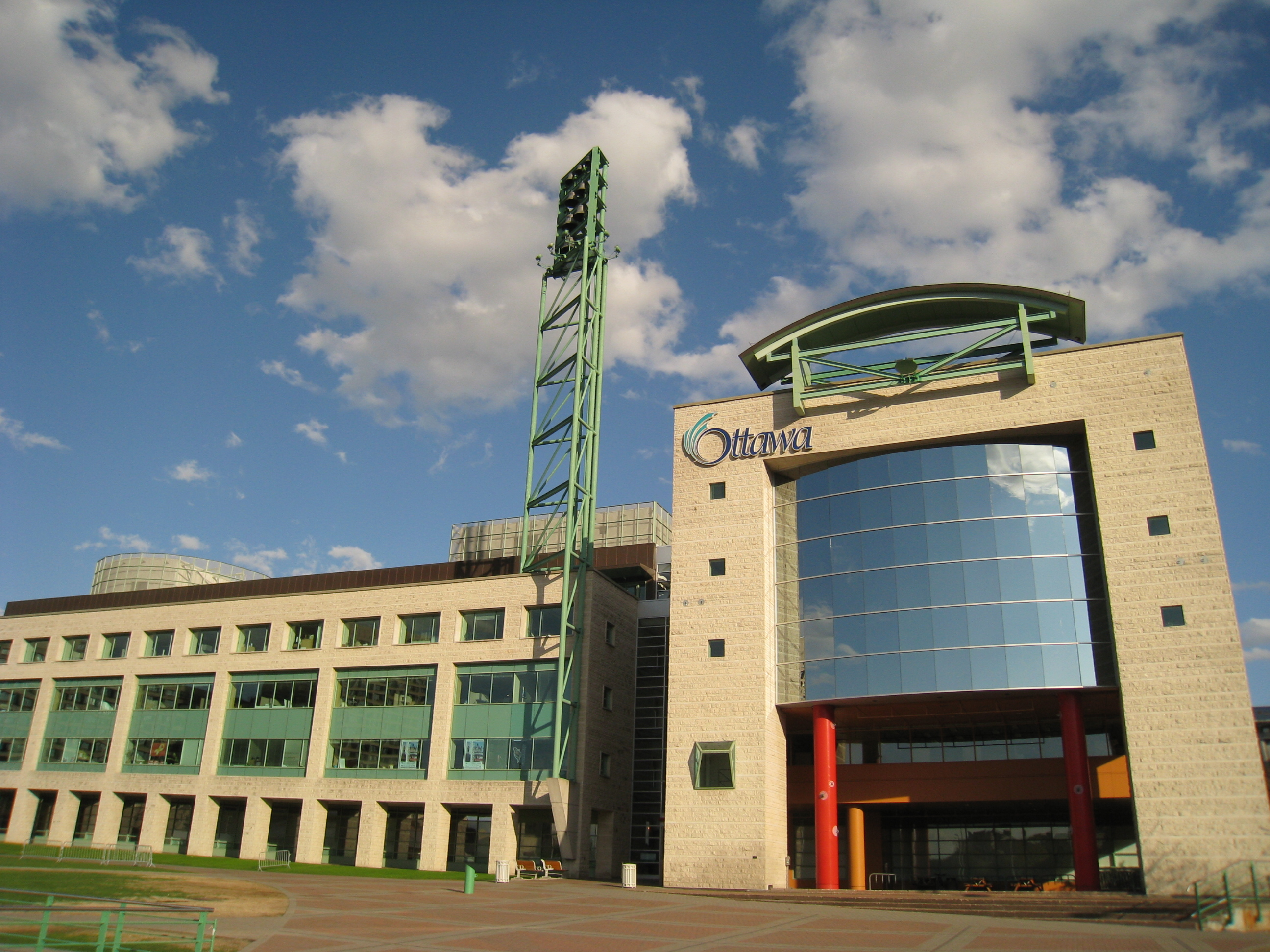
Ottawa City Hall.

=== Pre-amalgamation (since 1866) ===
==== 1866 ====
- Moss Kent Dickinson, mayor
- Isaac Berichon, alderman, Ottawa Ward
- James Cunningham, alderman, Victoria Ward
- Donald Dow, alderman, St. George's Ward
- Henry J. Friel, alderman, By Ward
- James Goodwin, alderman, Ottawa Ward
- John Langford, alderman, Victoria Ward
- Henry McCormick, alderman, Wellington Ward
- William Mosgrove, alderman, St. George's Ward
- Alexander Scott, alderman, Wellington Ward
- Isidore Traversy, alderman, By Ward
- Francis Abbott, councillor, Wellington Ward
- Charles Goulden, councillor, Ottawa Ward
- John B. Guerard, councillor, Ottawa Ward
- John Heney, councillor, By Ward
- Eugène Martineau, councillor, By Ward
- Lyman Perkins, councillor, Wellington Ward
- John Rowatt, councillor, Victoria Ward
- David Scott, councillor, Victoria Ward
- Thomas Starmer, councillor, St. George's Ward
- William C. Wood, councillor, St. George's Ward

==== 1867 ====
- Robert Lyon, St. George's Ward (elected mayor)
- Francis Abbott, Wellington Ward
- C. W. Bangs, Wellington Ward
- C. T. Bate, Wellington Ward
- James Cunningham, Victoria Ward
- J. P. Featherston, St. George's Ward
- Henry J. Friel, By Ward
- Charles Goulden, Ottawa Ward
- John B. Guerard, Ottawa Ward
- John Heney, By Ward
- John Langford, Victoria Ward
- Eugène Martineau, Ottawa Ward
- James G. Robinson, St. George's Ward
- John Rochester, Victoria Ward
- Isidore Traversy, By Ward

==== 1868 ====
- Henry J. Friel, By Ward (elected mayor)
- Francis Abbott, Wellington Ward
- C. W. Bangs, Wellington Ward
- James Cunningham, Victoria Ward
- J. P. Featherston, St. George's Ward
- Charles Goulden, Ottawa Ward
- John B. Guerard, Ottawa Ward
- John Heney, By Ward
- Robert Hunter, Wellington Ward
- John Langford, Victoria Ward
- Eugène Martineau, Ottawa Ward
- William Mosgrove, St. George's Ward
- James G. Robinson, St. George's Ward
- John Rochester, Victoria Ward
- Isidore Traversy, By Ward

==== 1869 ====
- Henry J. Friel, By Ward (elected mayor)
- Francis Abbott, Wellington Ward
- C. W. Bangs, Wellington Ward
- C. T. Bate, Wellington Ward
- James Cunningham, Victoria Ward
- J. P. Featherston, St. George's Ward
- Charles Goulden, Ottawa Ward
- John B. Guerard, Ottawa Ward
- John Heney, By Ward
- Eugène Martineau, Ottawa Ward
- William Mosgrove, St. George's Ward
- Abraham Pratt, Victoria Ward
- John Rochester, Victoria Ward
- James G. Robinson, St. George's Ward
- Isidore Traversy, By Ward

==== 1870 ====
- John Rochester, Victoria Ward (elected mayor)
- C. W. Bangs, Wellington Ward
- C. T. Bate, Wellington Ward
- James Cunningham, Victoria Ward
- J. P. Featherston, St. George's Ward
- Charles Goulden, Ottawa Ward
- John B. Guerard, Ottawa Ward
- John Heney, By Ward
- Horace Lapierre, By Ward
- Eugène Martineau, Ottawa Ward
- George May, Wellington Ward
- Francis McDougal, By Ward
- William Mosgrove, St. George's Ward
- Abraham Pratt, Victoria Ward
- James G. Robinson, St. George's Ward

==== 1871 ====
- John Rochester, Victoria Ward (elected mayor)
- A. H. Baldwin, Victoria Ward
- C. W. Bangs, Wellington Ward
- James Cunningham, St. George's Ward
- J. P. Featherston, St. George's Ward
- John Heney, By Ward
- William Kehoe, Ottawa Ward
- Horace Lapierre, By Ward
- Eugène Martineau, Ottawa Ward
- Francis McDougal, By Ward
- William Mosgrove, St. George's Ward
- J. R. O'Connor, Victoria Ward
- Amos Rowe, Wellington Ward
- George Taillon, Ottawa Ward
- A. S. Woodburn, Wellington Ward

==== 1872 ====
- Eugène Martineau, Ottawa Ward (elected mayor)
- C. W. Bangs, Wellington Ward
- E. H. Bronson, Victoria Ward
- James Cunningham, St. George's Ward
- J. P. Featherston, St. George's Ward
- John Heney, By Ward
- William Kehoe, Ottawa Ward
- Horace Lapierre, By Ward
- Peter LeSueur, Victoria Ward
- Francis McDougal, By Ward
- Charles McGee, Wellington Ward
- William Mosgrove, St. George's Ward
- Abraham Pratt, Victoria Ward
- O. A. Rocque, Ottawa Ward
- Amos Rowe, Wellington Ward

==== 1873 ====
- Eugène Martineau, mayor
- C. W. Bangs, Wellington Ward
- E. H. Bronson, Victoria Ward
- J. P. Featherston, St. George's Ward
- John Graham, St. George's Ward
- John Heney, By Ward
- William Kehoe, Ottawa Ward
- John Langford, Victoria Ward
- Horace Lapierre, By Ward
- Robert Lyon, St. George's
- Arthur Matthewman, Wellington Ward
- Francis McDougal, By Ward
- Abraham Pratt, Victoria Ward
- O. A. Rocque, Ottawa Ward
- Amos Rowe, Wellington Ward
- Isidore Traversy, Ottawa Ward

==== 1874 ====
- J. P. Featherston, mayor
- C. W. Bangs, Wellington Ward
- Thomas Birkett, St. George's Ward
- E. H. Bronson, Victoria Ward
- A. J. Christie, Wellington Ward
- Leon David, Victoria Ward
- F. X. Groulx, Ottawa Ward
- John Heney, By Ward
- Horace Lapierre, By Ward
- Francis McDougal, By Ward
- James O'Connor, Ottawa Ward
- Abraham Pratt, Victoria Ward
- John P. Robertson, St. George's Ward
- O. A. Rocque, Ottawa Ward
- Amos Rowe, Wellington Ward
- W. H. Waller, St. George's Ward

==== 1875 ====
- J. P. Featherston, mayor
- C. W. Bangs, Wellington Ward
- Thomas Birkett, St. George's Ward
- E. H. Bronson, Victoria Ward
- P. H. Chabot, By Ward
- A. J. Christie, Wellington Ward
- Leon David, Victoria Ward
- F. X. Groulx, Ottawa Ward
- John Heney, By Ward
- Francis McDougal, By Ward
- James O'Connor, Ottawa Ward
- Abraham Pratt, Victoria Ward
- Amos Rowe, Wellington Ward
- John P. Robertson, St. George's Ward
- O. A. Rocque, Ottawa Ward
- W. H. Waller, St. George's Ward

==== 1876 ====
- G. B. Lyon-Fellowes, mayor (until Mar. 15)
- W. H. Waller, mayor (from Apr. 6)
- Thomas Birkett, St. George's Ward
- E. H. Bronson, Victoria Ward
- P. H. Chabot, By Ward
- Thomas W. Currier, St. George's Ward
- James Egleson, St. George's Ward (from c. Feb.)
- A. De Guise, Ottawa Ward
- John Heney, By Ward
- James Lang, Wellington Ward
- Peter LeSueur, Wellington Ward
- Francis McDougal, By Ward
- James O'Connor, Ottawa Ward
- G. B. Pattee, Victoria Ward
- Abraham Pratt, Victoria Ward
- John P. Robertson, St. George's Ward (until c. Feb.)
- O. A. Rocque, Ottawa Ward
- Amos Rowe, Wellington Ward

==== 1877 ====
- W. H. Waller, mayor
- Thomas Birkett, St. George's Ward
- E. H. Bronson, Victoria Ward
- P. H. Chabot, By Ward
- J. A. Chevrier, Ottawa Ward
- Thomas W. Currier, St. George's Ward
- William Henderson, Wellington Ward
- James Lang, Wellington Ward
- E. E. Lauzon, Ottawa Ward
- John W. McRae, St. George's Ward
- Horace Merrill, Victoria Ward
- James O'Connor, Ottawa Ward
- George O'Keefe, By Ward
- Amos Rowe, Wellington Ward
- David Scott, Victoria Ward
- Michael Starrs, By Ward

==== 1878 ====
- C. W. Bangs, mayor
- E. C. Barber, Wellington Ward
- P. H. Chabot, By Ward
- J. A. Chevrier, Ottawa Ward
- John Clancy, Ottawa Ward
- J. R. Esmonde, St. George's Ward
- William Henderson, Wellington Ward
- John Heney, By Ward
- James Lang, Wellington Ward
- E. E. Lauzon, Ottawa Ward
- Andrew Masson, Victoria Ward
- John W. McRae, St. George's Ward
- Horace Merrill, Victoria Ward
- George O'Keefe, By Ward
- David Scott, Victoria Ward
- John Stewart, St. George's Ward

==== 1879 ====
- Charles Herbert Mackintosh, mayor
- J. A. Chevrier, Ottawa Ward
- John Clancy, Ottawa Ward
- A. O. F. Coleman, St. George's Ward
- John Heney, By Ward
- James Lang, Wellington Ward
- E. E. Lauzon, Ottawa Ward
- Peter LeSueur, Wellington Ward
- Andrew Masson, Victoria Ward
- John W. McRae, St. George's Ward
- Horace Merrill, Victoria Ward
- George O'Keefe, By Ward
- William Porter, Wellington Ward
- David Scott, Victoria Ward
- Michael Starrs, By Ward
- John Stewart, St. George's Ward

==== 1880 ====
- Charles Herbert Mackintosh, mayor
- Samuel Bingham, Ottawa Ward
- John Bobier, Victoria Ward
- Charles A. Christin, Victoria Ward
- A. O. F. Coleman, St. George's Ward
- James Egleson, St. George's Ward
- George A. Harris, St. George's Ward
- John Heney, By Ward
- J. C. Jamieson, Wellington Ward
- E. E. Lauzon, Ottawa Ward
- W. H. Lewis, Wellington Ward
- Andrew Masson, Victoria Ward
- O. A. Rocque, Ottawa Ward
- David Scott, Wellington Ward
- Michael Starrs, By Ward
- Pierre St. Jean, By Ward

==== 1881 ====
- Charles Herbert Mackintosh, mayor
- John Bobier, Victoria Ward
- A. O. F. Coleman, St. George's Ward
- Patrick Conway, By Ward
- G. A. Harris, St. George's Ward
- John Heney, By Ward
- J. C. Jamieson, Wellington Ward
- E. E. Lauzon, Ottawa Ward
- E. G. Laverdure, Ottawa Ward
- R. C. W. MacCuaig, Wellington Ward
- Andrew Masson, Victoria Ward
- Francis McDougal, Ottawa Ward
- John O'Leary, St. George's Ward
- David Scott, Wellington Ward
- Pierre St. Jean, By Ward
- Peter Whelan, Victoria Ward

==== 1882 ====
- Pierre St. Jean, mayor
- John Bobier, Victoria Ward
- William Cherry, Wellington Ward
- Patrick Conway, By Ward
- George Cox, Wellington Ward
- C. R. Cunningham, Victoria Ward
- Jacob Erratt, St. George's Ward
- John Heney, By Ward
- E. E. Lauzon, Ottawa Ward
- E. G. Laverdure, Ottawa Ward
- R. C. W. MacCuaig, Wellington Ward
- Francis McDougal, Ottawa Ward
- John O'Leary, St. George's Ward
- L. A. Olivier, By Ward
- Peter Whelan, Victoria Ward
- William Whillans, St. George's Ward

==== 1883 ====
- Pierre St. Jean, mayor
- W. E. Brown, St. George's Ward
- P. H. Chabot, By Ward
- William Cherry, Wellington Ward
- Patrick Conway, By Ward
- George Cox, Wellington Ward
- C. R. Cunningham, Victoria Ward
- Jacob Erratt, St. George's Ward
- Edmund Germain, By Ward
- James Gordon, Victoria Ward
- E. E. Lauzon, Ottawa Ward
- E. G. Laverdure, Ottawa Ward
- R. C. W. MacCuaig, Wellington Ward
- Francis McDougal, Ottawa Ward
- John O'Leary, St. George's Ward
- Peter Whelan, Victoria Ward

==== 1884 ====
- C. T. Bate, mayor
- W. E. Brown, St. George's Ward
- William Cherry, Wellington Ward
- George Cox, Wellington Ward
- C. R. Cunningham, Victoria Ward
- Charles Desjardins, Ottawa Ward
- Olivier Durocher, Ottawa Ward
- Jacob Erratt, St. George's Ward
- Edmund Germain, By Ward
- James Gordon, Victoria Ward
- John Heney, By Ward
- E. G. Laverdure, Ottawa Ward
- W. H. Lewis, Wellington Ward
- Anthony Swalwell, By Ward
- Peter Whelan, Victoria Ward
- William Whillans, St. George Ward

==== 1885 ====
- Francis McDougal, mayor
- Samuel Bingham, Ottawa Ward
- W. E. Brown, St. George's Ward
- William Cherry, Wellington Ward
- George Cox, Wellington Ward
- C. R. Cunningham, Victoria Ward
- Charles Desjardins, Ottawa Ward
- Olivier Durocher, Ottawa Ward
- Edmund Germain, By Ward
- James Gordon, Victoria Ward
- G. B. Greene, Wellington Ward
- John Heney, By Ward
- William H. Hutchison, Victoria Ward
- George O'Keefe, By Ward
- John O'Leary, St. George Ward
- William Whillans, St. George Ward

==== 1886 ====
- Francis McDougal, mayor
- W. E. Brown, St. George's Ward
- William Cherry, Wellington Ward
- George Cox, Wellington Ward
- George Dalglish, Victoria Ward
- Charles Desjardins, Ottawa Ward
- Olivier Durocher, Ottawa Ward
- Edmund Germain, By Ward
- James Gordon, Victoria Ward
- G. B. Greene, Wellington Ward
- John Heney, By Ward
- William H. Hutchison, Victoria Ward
- E. G. Laverdure, Ottawa Ward
- George O'Keefe, By Ward
- John O'Leary, St. George Ward
- William Whillans, St. George Ward

==== 1887 ====
- McLeod Stewart, mayor
- John Askwith, New Edinburgh Ward
- Samuel Bingham, Ottawa Ward
- William Borthwick, St. George Ward
- George Cox, Wellington Ward
- George Dalglish, Victoria Ward
- Charles Desjardins, Ottawa Ward
- Olivier Durocher, Ottawa Ward
- Edmund Germain, By Ward
- James Gordon, Victoria Ward
- John Henderson, New Edinburgh Ward
- John Heney, By Ward
- William H. Hutchison, Victoria Ward
- W. H. Lewis, Wellington Ward
- H. C. Monk, Wellington Ward
- George O'Keefe, By Ward
- John O'Leary, St. George Ward
- John C. Roger, New Edinburgh Ward
- William Whillans, St. George Ward

==== 1888 ====
- McLeod Stewart, mayor
- A. A. Adam, Ottawa Ward
- John Askwith, New Edinburgh Ward
- Samuel Bingham, Ottawa Ward
- William Borthwick, St. George Ward
- George Cox, Wellington Ward
- George Dalglish, Victoria Ward
- Olivier Durocher, Ottawa Ward
- Jacob Erratt, St. George Ward
- James Gordon, Victoria Ward
- John Henderson, New Edinburgh Ward
- John Heney, By Ward
- William H. Hutchison, Victoria Ward
- A. C. Larose, By Ward
- E. G. Laverdure, By Ward
- Taylor McVeity, Wellington Ward
- H. C. Monk, Wellington Ward
- John O'Leary, St. George Ward
- John C. Roger, New Edinburgh Ward

==== 1889 ====
- Jacob Erratt, mayor
- John Askwith, Rideau Ward
- George Baptie, Central Ward
- Samuel Bingham, Ottawa Ward
- William Borthwick, St. George Ward
- E. B. Butterworth, Central Ward
- William Campbell, Wellington Ward
- Levi Crannell, Dalhousie Ward
- George Dalglish, Victoria Ward
- Olivier Durocher, Ottawa Ward
- F. J. Farrell, By Ward
- James Gordon, Victoria Ward
- John Henderson, Rideau Ward
- John Heney, By Ward
- William Hill, Dalhousie Ward
- William H. Hutchison, Victoria Ward
- Oliver Latour, Ottawa Ward
- E. G. Laverdure, By Ward
- Alex MacLean, Wellington Ward
- H. C. Monk, Central Ward
- John O'Leary, St. George Ward
- John C. Roger, Rideau Ward
- David Scott, Dalhousie Ward
- Charles Scrim, Wellington Ward
- William R. Stroud, St. George Ward

==== 1890 ====
- Jacob Erratt, mayor
- John Askwith, Rideau Ward
- G. Baptie, Central Ward
- Samuel Bingham, Ottawa Ward
- William Borthwick, St. George Ward
- E. B. Butterworth, Central Ward
- William Campbell, Wellington Ward
- Levi Crannell, Dalhousie Ward
- Olivier Durocher, Ottawa Ward
- William Hill, Dalhousie Ward
- F. G. Farrell, By Ward
- James Gordon, Victoria Ward
- John Henderson, Rideau Ward
- John Heney, By Ward
- William H. Hutchison, Victoria Ward
- William Johnstone, Victoria Ward
- E. G. Laverdure, By Ward
- Alex MacLean, Wellington Ward
- H. C. Monk, Central Ward
- Thomas Raphael, St. George Ward
- A. D. Richard, Ottawa Ward
- David Scott, Dalhousie Ward
- Charles Scrim, Wellington Ward
- William R. Stroud, St. George Ward
- Thomas Tubman, Rideau Ward

==== 1891 ====
- Thomas Birkett, mayor
- Samuel Bingham, Ottawa Ward
- William Borthwick, St. George Ward
- C. S. O. Boudreault, Ottawa Ward
- E. B. Butterworth, Central Ward
- William Campbell, Wellington Ward
- George Cox, Central Ward
- Edward Devlin, By Ward
- Olivier Durocher, Ottawa Ward
- James D. Fraser, Rideau Ward
- A. Grant, Wellington Ward
- John Henderson, Rideau Ward
- William H. Hewlett, Dalhousie Ward
- William Hill, Dalhousie Ward
- William H. Hutchison, Victoria Ward
- W. J. Johnstone, Victoria Ward
- E. G. Laverdure, By Ward
- John O'Leary, St. George Ward
- John C. Roger, Rideau Ward
- A. Savard, By Ward
- Charles Scrim, Wellington Ward
- J. K. Stewart, Victoria Ward
- William R. Stroud, St. George Ward
- R. Thackray, Dalhousie Ward
- James Wallace, Central Ward

==== 1892 ====
- Olivier Durocher, mayor
- William Ashe, Wellington Ward
- S. W. H. Baldwin, St. George Ward
- Samuel Bingham, Ottawa Ward
- William Campbell, Wellington Ward
- Napoléon Champagne, Ottawa Ward
- William Cluff, Central Ward
- Levi Crannel, Victoria Ward
- C. R. Cunningham, Victoria Ward
- Edward Devlin, By Ward
- George Forde, Rideau Ward
- James D. Fraser, Rideau Ward
- Joseph Gareau, By Ward
- Joseph Hawken, Rideau Ward
- William H. Hewlett, Dalhousie Ward
- William Hill, Dalhousie Ward
- T. Lemay, Ottawa Ward
- William Dowler Morris, Central Ward
- John O'Leary, St. George Ward
- James Peterkin, Dalhousie Ward
- Charles Scrim, Wellington Ward
- Michael Starrs, By Ward
- J. K. Stewart, Victoria Ward
- William R. Stroud, St. George Ward
- Edward Wallace, Central Ward

==== 1893 ====
- Olivier Durocher, mayor
- William Ashe, Wellington Ward
- S. W. H. Baldwin, St. George Ward
- Samuel Bingham, Ottawa Ward
- William Campbell, Wellington Ward
- F. R. E. Campeau, St. George Ward
- John Casey, By Ward
- Napoléon Champagne, Ottawa Ward
- J. A. Corry, Wellington Ward
- James D. Fraser, Rideau Ward
- Joseph Gareau, By Ward
- John C. Grant, St. George Ward
- George M. Greene, Central Ward
- Joseph Hawken, Rideau Ward
- Stuart Alexander Henderson, Central Ward
- J. C. Jamieson, Dalhousie Ward
- Alex MacLean, Victoria Ward
- Donald Mason, Victoria Ward
- Terrence McGuire, Dalhousie Ward
- J. L. Olivier, Ottawa Ward
- James Peterkin, Dalhousie Ward
- John C. Roger, Rideau Ward
- David Scott, Victoria Ward
- Michael Starrs, By Ward
- Edward Wallace, Central Ward

==== 1894 ====
- George Cox, mayor
- F. R. E. Campeau, St. George Ward
- William Campbell, Wellington Ward
- Napoléon Champagne, Ottawa Ward
- William Cluff, Central Ward
- Fred Cook, Central Ward
- J. A. Corry, Wellington Ward
- Robert Davidson, Dalhousie Ward
- A. D. Fraser, Victoria Ward
- James D. Fraser, Rideau Ward
- Joseph Gareau, By Ward
- John Gleeson, By Ward
- George M. Greene, Central Ward
- Joseph Hawken, Rideau Ward
- J. C. Jamieson, Dalhousie Ward
- E. G. Laverdure, Ottawa Ward
- Alex MacLean, Victoria Ward
- Terrence McGuire, Dalhousie Ward
- William Dowler Morris, Central Ward
- J. L. Olivier, Ottawa Ward
- J. H. Parnell, St. George Ward
- John C. Roger, Rideau Ward
- David Scott, Victoria Ward
- Michael Starrs, By Ward
- Robert Stewart, Wellington Ward

==== 1895 ====
- William Borthwick, mayor
- Basil H. Bell, Rideau Ward
- William Campbell, Wellington Ward
- Napoléon Champagne, Ottawa Ward
- Fred Cook, Central Ward
- George Dalglish, Victoria Ward
- Robert Davidson, Dalhousie Ward
- Samuel J. Davis, Wellington Ward
- J. C. Enright, Victoria Ward
- George Forde, Rdieau Ward
- John Gleeson, By Ward
- John C. Grant, St. George Ward
- George M. Greene, Central Ward
- Robert Hastey, St. George Ward
- J. C. Jamieson, Dalhousie Ward
- E. E. Lauzon, Ottawa Ward
- E. G. Laverdure, Ottawa Ward
- F. H. Martelock, Rideau Ward
- Terrence McGuire, Dalhousie Ward
- Donald T. Masson, Victoria Ward
- William Dowler Morris, Central Ward
- Thomas Payment, By Ward
- Michael Starrs, By Ward
- Robert Stewart, Wellington Ward
- Edward Wallace, Central Ward

==== 1896 ====
- William Borthwick, mayor
- Basil H. Bell, Rideau Ward
- Thomas Butler, Victoria Ward
- William Campbell, Wellington Ward
- Napoléon Champagne, Ottawa Ward
- William Cluff, Central Ward
- Fred Cook, Central Ward
- George Dalglish, Victoria Ward
- Robert Davidson, Dalhousie Ward
- Samuel J. Davis, Wellington Ward
- J. B. Donaldson, Rideau Ward
- George Forde, Rdieau Ward
- Joseph Gareau, By Ward
- Edmond Gauthier, Ottawa Ward
- John C. Grant, St. George Ward
- Robert Hastey, St. George Ward
- William H. Hewlett, Dalhousie Ward
- William Hill, Dalhousie Ward
- E. G. Laverdure, Ottawa Ward
- Donald T. Masson, Victoria Ward
- William Dowler Morris, Central Ward
- Thomas Payment, By Ward
- Joseph Rowan, By Ward (elected c. June)
- Michael Starrs, By Ward (resigned June 15)
- Robert Stewart, Wellington Ward
- Edward Wallace, Central Ward

==== 1897 ====
- Samuel Bingham, mayor
- William G. Black, Wellington Ward
- Thomas Butler, Victoria Ward
- William Campbell, Wellington Ward
- Fred Cook, Central Ward
- Robert Davidson, Dalhousie Ward
- J. B. Donaldson, Rideau Ward
- O. Durocher, Ottawa Ward
- J. C. Enright, Victoria Ward
- Joseph Foster, Dalhousie Ward
- James D. Fraser, Rideau Ward
- Joseph Gareau, By Ward
- Edmond Gauthier, Ottawa Ward
- John C. Grant, St. George Ward
- Robert Hastey, St. George Ward
- Donald T. Masson, Victoria Ward
- Terence McGuire, Dalhousie Ward
- Thomas Payment, By Ward
- C. B. Powell, Central Ward
- John C. Roger, Rideau Ward
- Maynard Rogers, St. George Ward (resigned in October)
- Robert Stewart, Wellington Ward
- Pierre St. Jean, By Ward
- R. Tobin, St. George Ward (elected c. October)
- Edward Wallace, Central Ward
- James White, Ottawa Ward

==== 1898 ====
- Samuel Bingham, mayor
- William G. Black, Wellington Ward
- Thomas Butler, Victoria Ward
- William Campbell, Wellington Ward
- William Cluff, Central Ward
- James Davidson, Wellington Ward
- Robert Davidson, Dalhousie Ward
- Samuel J. Davis, Central Ward
- J. B. Donaldson, Rideau Ward
- Olivier Durocher, Ottawa Ward
- J. C. Enright, Victoria Ward
- Joseph Foster, Dalhousie Ward
- Joseph Gareau, By Ward
- John C. Grant, St. George Ward
- Robert Hastey, St. George Ward
- William H. Hewlett, Dalhousie Ward
- Emery Lapointe, Ottawa Ward
- Donald T. Masson, Victoria Ward
- William Dowler Morris, Central Ward
- Thomas Payment, By Ward
- S. R. Poulin, By Ward
- John C. Roger, Rideau Ward
- Breary Slinn, Rideau Ward
- William R. Stroud, St. George Ward
- James White, Ottawa Ward

==== 1899 ====
- Thomas Payment, mayor
- Basil H. Bell, Rideau Ward (died in office)
- William G. Black, Wellington Ward
- Thomas Butler, Victoria Ward
- William Campbell, Wellington Ward
- Napoléon Champagne, Ottawa Ward
- James Davidson, Wellington Ward
- Robert Davidson, Dalhousie Ward
- Samuel J. Davis, Central Ward
- A. W. Desjardins, By Ward
- George Forde, Rideau Ward (elected March 22)
- Joseph Foster, Dalhousie Ward
- A. E. Fripp, Central Ward
- Joseph Gareau, By Ward
- Edmond Gauthier, Ottawa Ward
- Robert Hastey, St. George Ward
- William H. Hewlett, Dalhousie Ward
- H. H. Lang, Victoria Ward
- Donald T. Masson, Victoria Ward
- William Dowler Morris, Central Ward
- Thomas Raphael, St. George Ward
- John C. Roger, Rideau Ward
- D'Arcy Scott, St. George Ward
- Breary Slinn, Rideau Ward
- Michael Starrs, By Ward
- James White, Ottawa Ward

==== 1900 ====
- Thomas Payment, mayor
- Thomas Butler, Victoria Ward
- Napoléon Champagne, Ottawa Ward
- James Davidson, Wellington Ward
- Robert Davidson, Dalhousie Ward
- Samuel J. Davis, Central Ward
- George Dearing, Central Ward
- A. W. Desjardins, By Ward
- John C. Enright, Victoria Ward
- George Forde, Rideau Ward
- Joseph Foster, Dalhousie Ward
- Joseph Gareau, By Ward
- Robert Hastey, St. George Ward
- William H. Hewlett, Dalhousie Ward
- Charles Hopwell, Wellington Ward
- Emery Lapointe, Ottawa Ward
- Donald T. Masson, Victoria Ward
- F. F. Morris, Wellington Ward
- William Dowler Morris, Central Ward
- Thomas Raphael, St. George Ward
- John C. Roger, Rideau Ward
- D'Arcy Scott, St. George Ward
- Breary Slinn, Rideau Ward
- Michael Starrs, By Ward
- James White, Ottawa Ward

==== 1901 ====
- William Dowler Morris, mayor (until Nov. 16)
- John Askwith, Rideau Ward
- G. M. Bayly, Wellington Ward (from June 25)
- Napoléon Champagne, Ottawa Ward
- Walter Cunningham, St. George Ward
- James Davidson, Wellington Ward (mayor from Nov. 16)
- Robert Davidson, Dalhousie Ward
- George Dearing, Central Ward
- A. W. Desjardins, By Ward
- James A. Ellis, Rideau Ward
- John C. Enright, Victoria Ward
- John C. Grant, Rideau Ward
- Robert Hastey, St. George Ward
- William Hill, Dalhousie Ward
- Charles Hopwell, Wellington Ward
- Emery Lapointe, Ottawa Ward
- W. H. Lewis, Central Ward
- Donald T. Masson, Victoria Ward
- D. J. McDougal, By Ward
- F. F. Morris, Wellington Ward (until June 3)
- Moïse Plouffe, Dalhousie Ward
- S. R. Poulin, By Ward
- Daniel Storey, Central Ward
- William R. Stroud, St. George Ward
- C. B. Taggart, Victoria Ward
- J. U. Vincent, Ottawa Ward

==== 1902 ====
- Fred Cook, mayor
- John Askwith, Rideau Ward
- W. C. Beaman, Wellington Ward
- P. H. Chabot, By Ward
- Napoléon Champagne, Ottawa Ward
- Thomas Cleary, Dalhousie Ward
- John Coates, Central Ward
- Walter Cunningham, St. George Ward
- James Davidson, Wellington Ward
- A. W. Desjardins, By Ward
- James A. Ellis, Rideau Ward
- J. C. Enright, Victoria Ward
- Robert Hastey, St. George Ward
- Emery Lapointe, Ottawa Ward
- Thomas Payment, By Ward
- Charles G. Pepper, Central Ward
- Moïse Plouffe, Dalhousie Ward
- Samuel Rosenthal, Victoria Ward
- P. D. Ross, Central Ward
- A. E. Sanderson, Wellington Ward
- G. W. Shouldis, Dalhousie Ward
- Breary Slinn, Rideau Ward
- William R. Stroud, St. George Ward
- Frank D. Taylor, Victoria Ward
- J. U. Vincent, Ottawa Ward

==== 1903 ====
- Fred Cook, mayor
- John Askwith, Rideau Ward
- Napoléon Champagne, Ottawa Ward
- Thomas Cleary, Dalhousie Ward
- Walter Cunningham, St. George Ward
- James Davidson, Wellington Ward
- A. W. Desjardins, By Ward
- James A. Ellis, Rideau Ward
- J. C. Enright, Victoria Ward
- G. S. Fleming, Victoria Ward
- John C. Grant, Rideau Ward
- Robert Hastey, St. George Ward
- Charles Hopewell, Dalhousie Ward
- Fred Journeaux, Central Ward
- W. J. Kidd, Wellington Ward
- J. M. Lavoie, Ottawa Ward
- Thomas Payment, By Ward
- A. L. Pinard, Ottawa Ward
- Moïse Plouffe, Dalhousie Ward
- Samuel Rosenthal, Victoria Ward
- P. D. Ross, Central Ward
- A. E. Sanderson, Wellington Ward
- Bernard Slattery, By Ward
- Daniel Storey, Central Ward
- William R. Stroud, St. George Ward

==== 1904 ====
- James A. Ellis, mayor
- John Askwith, Rideau Ward
- C. S. O. Boudreault, Ottawa Ward
- W. E. Brown, Victoria Ward
- William Campbell, Wellington Ward
- Napoléon Champagne, Ottawa Ward
- O. E. Culbert, Rideau Ward
- Walter Cunningham, St. George Ward
- James Davidson, Wellington Ward
- A. W. Desjardins, By Ward
- G. S. Fleming, Victoria Ward
- Joseph Foster, Dalhousie Ward
- Edmond Gauthier, Ottawa Ward
- John C. Grant, Rideau Ward
- Robert Hastey, St. George Ward
- Fred Journeaux, Central Ward
- Thomas Payment, By Ward
- Charles G. Pepper, Central Ward
- Moïse Plouffe, Dalhousie Ward
- Samuel Rosenthal, Victoria Ward
- A. E. Sanderson, Wellington Ward
- G. W. Shouldis, Dalhousie Ward
- Bernard Slattery, By Ward
- Daniel Storey, Central Ward
- William R. Stroud, St. George Ward

==== 1905 ====
- James A. Ellis, mayor
- John Armstrong, Victoria Ward
- John Askwith, Rideau Ward
- William G. Black, Wellington Ward
- C. S. O. Boudreault, Ottawa Ward
- W. E. Brown, Victoria Ward (after July 3)
- Napoléon Champagne, Ottawa Ward
- James Davidson, Wellington Ward
- A. W. Desjardins, By Ward
- J. C. Enright, Victoria Ward (until July 3)
- William Farmer, Dalhousie Ward
- Edmond Gauthier, Ottawa Ward
- John Gleeson, By Ward
- John C. Grant, Rideau Ward
- Robert Hastey, St. George Ward
- Fred Journeaux, Central Ward
- Charles Lapierre, By Ward
- E. J. Laverdure, St. George Ward
- Michael O'Leary, St. George Ward
- Charles G. Pepper, Central Ward
- Moïse Plouffe, Dalhousie Ward
- Samuel Rosenthal, Victoria Ward
- George R. Ross, Dalhousie Ward
- A. E. Sanderson, Wellington Ward
- Breary Slinn, Rideau Ward
- Daniel Storey, Central Ward

==== 1906 ====
- James A. Ellis, mayor (until Dec. 17)
- John Armstrong, Victoria Ward
- C. S. O. Boudreault, Ottawa Ward
- W. E. Brown, Victoria Ward
- Napoléon Champagne, Ottawa Ward
- Walter Cunningham, St. George Ward
- James Davidson, Wellington Ward
- S. J. Davis, Central Ward
- A. W. Desjardins, By Ward
- Edmond Gauthier, Ottawa Ward
- John Gleeson, By Ward
- Robert Hastey, St. George Ward (mayor after Dec. 17)
- Charles Hopewell, Dalhousie Ward
- Charles Lapierre, By Ward
- E. J. Laverdure, St. George Ward
- Edward P. McGrath, Dalhousie Ward
- Charles G. Pepper, Central Ward
- John Harold Putnam, Rideau Ward
- Samuel Rosenthal, Victoria Ward
- George R. Ross, Dalhousie Ward
- A. E. Sanderson, Wellington Ward
- William Short, Rideau Ward
- Breary Slinn, Rideau Ward
- Daniel Storey, Central Ward
- George H. Wilson, Wellington Ward

==== 1907 ====
- D'Arcy Scott, mayor
- John Armstrong, Victoria Ward
- John Askwith, Rideau Ward
- W. W. Boucher, Victoria Ward
- C. S. O. Boudreault, Ottawa Ward
- Napoléon Champagne, Ottawa Ward
- Walter Cunningham, St. George Ward
- James Davidson, Wellington Ward
- S. J. Davis, Central Ward
- A. W. Desjardins, By Ward
- William Farmer, Dalhousie Ward
- R. King Farrow, Wellington Ward
- Edmond Gauthier, Ottawa Ward
- John C. Grant, Rideau Ward
- Robert Hastey, St. George Ward
- Alphonse Julien, By Ward
- John G. Kilt, St. George Ward
- Charles Lapierre, By Ward
- George A. Little, Central Ward
- Edward P. McGrath, Dalhousie Ward
- Charles G. Pepper, Central Ward
- Samuel Rosenthal, Victoria Ward
- George R. Ross, Dalhousie Ward
- William Short, Rideau Ward
- George H. Wilson, Wellington Ward

==== 1908 ====
- D'Arcy Scott, mayor (until Nov. 12)
- Napoléon Champagne, controller (mayor after Nov. 12)
- James Davidson, controller (until Nov. 25)
- Robert Hastey, controller
- Charles Hopewell, controller
- C. S. O. Boudreault, Ottawa Ward
- W. E. Brown, Victoria Ward
- Walter Cunningham, St. George Ward
- S. J. Davis, Central Ward
- A. W. Desjardins, By Ward
- William Farmer, Dalhousie Ward
- R. King Farrow, Wellington Ward
- William Foran, St. George Ward
- Edmond Gauthier, Ottawa Ward
- John C. Grant, Rideau Ward
- Charles Lapierre, By Ward
- George A. Little, Central Ward
- Edward P. McGrath, Dalhousie Ward (controller after Nov. 18)
- Samuel Rosenthal, Victoria Ward
- Breary Slinn, Rideau Ward
- George H. Wilson, Wellington Ward

==== 1909 ====
- Charles Hopewell, mayor
- Napoléon Champagne, controller
- James Davidson, controller
- Robert Hastey, controller
- George H. Wilson, controller
- John Baxter, By Ward
- Ira Bower, Central Ward
- W. E. Brown, Victoria Ward
- A. E. Caron, St. George Ward
- Walter Cunningham, St. George Ward (until Apr. 19)
- A. W. Desjardins, By Ward
- R. King Farrow, Wellington Ward
- John C. Grant, Rideau Ward
- Edward H. Hinchey, Wellington Ward
- Alphonse Julien, Ottawa Ward
- George A. Little, Central Ward
- Edward P. McGrath, Dalhousie Ward
- Joseph Albert Pinard, Ottawa Ward
- Samuel Rosenthal, Victoria Ward
- George R. Ross, Dalhousie Ward
- Breary Slinn, Rideau Ward
- William R. Stroud, Wellington Ward (after May 11)

==== 1910 ====
- Charles Hopewell, mayor
- Napoléon Champagne, controller
- James Davidson, controller (until Nov. 25)
- Robert Hastey, controller
- Edward H. Hinchey, controller
- John Baxter, By Ward
- W. W. Boucher, Wellington Ward (until Oct. 3)
- William G. Black, Wellington Ward
- Victor Boisvert, Dalhousie Ward
- Ira Bower, Central Ward
- W. E. Brown, Victoria Ward
- Herbert S. Campbell, Central Ward
- William Campbell, Wellington Ward (from Oct. 20)
- A. E. Caron, St. George Ward
- John Carnochan, Capital Ward
- Walter Cunningham, St. George Ward
- A. W. Desjardins, By Ward
- James A. Forward, Dalhousie Ward
- John C. Grant, Rideau Ward
- Alphonse Julien, Ottawa Ward
- Thomas E. McDonald, Rideau Ward
- J. W. Nelson, Capital Ward
- Joseph Albert Pinard, Ottawa Ward
- L. E. Stanley, Victoria Ward

==== 1911 ====
- Charles Hopewell, mayor
- Napoléon Champagne, controller
- James Davidson, controller (until Oct. 7)
- Robert Hastey, controller
- Edward H. Hinchey, controller
- W. E. Brown, Victoria Ward (controller after Nov. 6)
- Herbert S. Campbell, Central Ward
- William Campbell, Wellington Ward
- John Carnochan, Capital Ward
- Walter Cunningham, St. George Ward
- James A. Forward, Dalhousie Ward
- John C. Grant, Rideau Ward
- Edward Gaulin, By Ward
- Alphonse Julien, Ottawa Ward
- Joseph Kent, Central Ward
- Moïse Lapointe, By Ward
- Donald T. Masson, Wellington Ward
- J. W. Nelson, Capital Ward
- Joseph Albert Pinard, Ottawa Ward
- John H. Slack, Dalhousie Ward (resigned Jan. 9; re-elected Jan. 26)
- Breary Slinn, Rideau Ward
- L. E. Stanley, Victoria Ward
- William R. Stroud, St. George Ward

==== 1912 ====
- Charles Hopewell, mayor (until June 21)
- Edward H. Hinchey, controller (mayor after June 21)
- Stewart McClenaghan, controller
- Robert Hastey, controller
- Rufus H. Parent, controller
- Arthur W. Ault, Capital Ward
- William G. Black, Wellington Ward
- William Campbell, Wellington Ward
- Rodolphe Chevrier, St. George Ward
- Alfred W. Desjardins, By Ward
- E. R. Desrosiers, Ottawa Ward
- James A. Forward, Dalhousie Ward
- William Foster Garland, Victoria Ward
- Ainslie W. Greene, Victoria Ward
- Frederick D. Hogg, Central Ward
- Joseph Kent, Central Ward
- Moïse Lapointe, By Ward
- J. W. Nelson, Capital Ward
- George J. O'Connor, St. George Ward
- Frank E. Perney, Rideau Ward
- John H. Slack, Dalhousie Ward
- Breary Slinn, Rideau Ward
- R. E. Valin, Ottawa Ward

==== 1913 ====
- James A. Ellis, mayor
- Edward H. Hinchey, controller
- Joseph Kent, controller
- John W. Nelson, controller
- Rufus H. Parent, controller
- Arthur W. Ault, Capital Ward
- Arthur Beaulieu, Ottawa Ward
- Thomas Brethour, Rideau Ward
- John Carnochan, Capital Ward
- William Cherry, Rideau Ward
- Walter Cunningham, St. George Ward
- Alfred W. Desjardins, By Ward
- Harold Fisher, Wellington Ward
- James A. Forward, Dalhousie Ward
- Ainslie W. Greene, Victoria Ward
- Frederick D. Hogg, Central Ward
- Eugene Labelle, By Ward
- Ernest Laroche, Victoria Ward
- William Macdonald, Wellington Ward
- Edward R. McNeill, Central Ward
- George J. O'Connor, St. George Ward
- Oscar Racine, Ottawa Ward
- William C. Rowe, Dalhousie Ward

==== 1914 ====
- Taylor McVeity, mayor
- E. R. McNeill, controller
- John W. Nelson, controller
- Joseph Kent, controller
- Rufus H. Parent, controller
- T. T. Beattie, Dalhousie Ward
- Arthur Beaulieu, Ottawa Ward
- Thomas Brethour, Rideau Ward
- John Carnochan, Capital Ward
- Walter Cunningham, St. George Ward
- Alfred W. Desjardins, By Ward
- William Findlay, Central Ward
- Harold Fisher, Wellington Ward
- W. N. Graham, Capital Ward
- Frederick D. Hogg, Central Ward
- Eugene Labelle, By Ward
- Ernest Laroche, Victoria Ward
- Harry Low, Rideau Ward
- William Macdonald, Wellington Ward
- George J. O'Connor, St. George Ward
- Joseph Albert Pinard, Ottawa Ward
- William C. Rowe, Dalhousie Ward
- David Rice, Victoria Ward

==== 1915 ====
- Nelson D. Porter, mayor
- Harold Fisher, controller
- John W. Nelson, controller
- J. A. Ellis, controller
- Napoléon Champagne, controller
- Henry Ackland, Rideau Ward
- T. T. Beattie, Dalhousie Ward
- Thomas Brethour, Rideau Ward
- John Carnochan, Capital Ward
- Walter Cunningham, St. George Ward
- James D. Denny, Wellington Ward
- J. W. Featherston, Wellington Ward
- William Findlay, Central Ward
- Edouard Gaulin, By Ward
- Alphonse Julien, By Ward
- Ernest Laroche, Victoria Ward
- Edward P. McGrath, Dalhousie Ward
- James Muir, Capital Ward
- George J. O'Connor, St. George Ward
- Charles G. Pepper, Central Ward
- Joseph Albert Pinard, Ottawa Ward
- Oscar Racine, Ottawa Ward
- David Rice, Victoria Ward

==== 1916 ====
- Nelson D. Porter, mayor
- Harold Fisher, controller
- John W. Nelson, controller
- Joseph Kent, controller
- Napoléon Champagne, controller
- Thomas Brethour, Rideau Ward
- Thomas R. Browne, Capital Ward
- William Cherry, Rideau Ward
- Walter Cunningham, St. George Ward
- James D. Denny, Wellington Ward
- J. W. Featherston, Wellington Ward
- William Findlay, Central Ward
- James A. Forward, Dalhousie Ward
- Edouard Gaulin, By Ward
- B. S. Hastey, St. George Ward
- Eugene J. Labelle, By Ward
- Ernest Laroche, Victoria Ward
- W. C. Leech, Dalhousie Ward
- James Muir, Capital Ward
- Charles G. Pepper, Central Ward
- Joseph Albert Pinard, Ottawa Ward
- Oscar Racine, Ottawa Ward
- D. A. Sinclair, Victoria Ward

==== 1917 ====
- Harold Fisher, mayor
- Edward H. Hinchey, controller
- John W. Nelson, controller
- Joseph Kent, controller
- Napoléon Champagne, controller
- Thomas R. Browne, Capital Ward
- William Cherry, Rideau Ward
- Walter Cunningham, St. George Ward
- James D. Denny, Wellington Ward
- Fred Desjardins, By Ward
- James A. Forward, Dalhousie Ward
- B. S. Hastey, St. George Ward
- Eugene J. Labelle, By Ward
- Ernest Laroche, Victoria Ward
- John A. Macdonald, Central Ward
- Edward P. McGrath, Dalhousie Ward
- Charles G. Pepper, Central Ward
- Joseph Albert Pinard, Ottawa Ward
- Frank H. Plant, Capital Ward
- Oscar Racine, Ottawa Ward
- David Rice, Victoria Ward
- Breary Slinn, Rideau Ward
- Charles R. Stephen, Wellington Ward

==== 1918 ====
- Harold Fisher, mayor
- James Muir, controller
- Ainslie W. Greene, controller
- Joseph Kent, controller
- Napoléon Champagne, controller
- John P. Balharrie, Dalhousie Ward
- William Cherry, Rideau Ward
- Walter Cunningham, St. George Ward
- James D. Denny, Wellington Ward
- Fred Desjardins, By Ward
- William Findlay, Central Ward
- Arthur R. Ford, Capital Ward
- James A. Forward, Dalhousie Ward
- Edward Gaulin, By Ward
- Wilfrid J. Grace, St. George Ward
- Ernest Laroche, Victoria Ward
- Douglas H. Macdonald, Rideau Ward
- Charles G. Pepper, Central Ward
- Joseph Albert Pinard, Ottawa Ward
- Frank H. Plant, Capital Ward
- Oscar Racine, Ottawa Ward
- David Rice, Victoria Ward
- Charles R. Stephen, Wellington Ward

==== 1919 ====
- Harold Fisher, mayor
- Frank H. Plant, controller
- J. W. Nelson, controller (until Dec. 1)
- Joseph Kent, controller
- Napoléon Champagne, controller
- John P. Balharrie, Dalhousie Ward
- Walter Cunningham, St. George Ward (controller from Dec. 1 on)
- William Y. Denison, Capital Ward
- James D. Denny, Wellington Ward
- Fred Desjardins, By Ward
- Arthur R. Ford, Capital Ward
- James A. Forward, Dalhousie Ward
- Edward Gaulin, By Ward
- Wilfrid J. Grace, St. George Ward
- Waldo Guertin, Ottawa Ward
- Ernest Laroche, Victoria Ward
- Douglas H. Macdonald, Rideau Ward
- John F. McKinley, Central Ward
- Charles G. Pepper, Central Ward
- Joseph Albert Pinard, Ottawa Ward
- David Rice, Victoria Ward
- Breary Slinn, Rideau Ward
- Charles R. Stephen, Wellington Ward

==== 1920 ====
- Harold Fisher, mayor
- Frank H. Plant, controller
- John Cameron, controller
- Joseph Kent, controller
- Napoléon Champagne, controller
- John P. Balharrie, Dalhousie Ward
- Napoleon Bordeleau, Ottawa Ward
- Walter Cunningham, St. George Ward
- William Y. Denison, Capital Ward
- James D. Denny, Wellington Ward (until Mar. 1)
- Fred Desjardins, By Ward
- Arthur Ellis, Rideau Ward
- Arthur R. Ford, Capital Ward (until Sept. 20)
- James A. Forward, Dalhousie Ward
- Edward Gaulin, By Ward
- Wilfrid J. Grace, St. George Ward
- Ernest Laroche, Victoria Ward
- Ernest D. Lowe, Wellington Ward
- Douglas H. Macdonald, Rideau Ward
- Joseph G. McGuire, Wellington Ward (from Mar. 22)
- John F. McKinley, Central Ward
- Charles G. Pepper, Central Ward
- Joseph Albert Pinard, Ottawa Ward
- David Rice, Victoria Ward

==== 1921 ====
- Frank H. Plant, mayor
- John Cameron, controller
- Arthur Ellis, controller
- John P. Balharrie, controller
- Napoléon Champagne, controller
- Napoleon Bordeleau, Ottawa Ward
- Rupert Broadfoot, Rideau Ward
- Walter Cunningham, St. George
- Fred Desjardins, By Ward
- James A. Forward, Dalhousie Ward
- Edward Gaulin, By Ward
- Fred Hunt, Dalhousie Ward
- Ernest Laroche, Victoria Ward
- Ernest D. Lowe, Wellington Ward
- Douglas H. Macdonald, Rideau Ward
- Herbert H. McElroy, Capital Ward
- James W. McNabb, Wellington Ward
- Charles G. Pepper, Central Ward
- Joseph Albert Pinard, Ottawa Ward
- Sam Rosenthal, Victoria Ward
- J. J. Slattery, Capital Ward
- Charles Allen Snowdon, Central Ward
- Leslie Whyte, St. George Ward

==== 1922 ====
- Frank H. Plant, mayor
- John Cameron, controller
- Arthur Ellis, controller
- John P. Balharrie, controller
- Napoléon Champagne, controller
- Napoleon Bordeleau, Ottawa Ward
- T. H. Brewer, Capital Ward
- Rupert Broadfoot, Rideau Ward
- Walter Cunningham, St. George
- Fred Desjardins, By Ward
- J. A. Forward, Dalhousie Ward
- Edward Gaulin, By Ward
- Waldo Guertin, Ottawa Ward
- Ernest Laroche, Victoria Ward
- Ernest D. Lowe, Wellington Ward
- Douglas H. Macdonald, Rideau Ward
- William McCaffrey, St. George Ward
- Herbert H. McElroy, Capital Ward
- James W. McNabb, Wellington Ward
- Patrick Nolan, Victoria Ward
- W. E. O'Meara, Dalhousie Ward
- Charles G. Pepper, Central Ward
- Charles Allen Snowdon, Central Ward

==== 1923 ====
- Frank H. Plant, mayor
- John Cameron, controller
- Arthur Ellis, controller
- John P. Balharrie, controller
- Joseph McGuire, controller
- Napoleon Bordeleau, Ottawa Ward
- T. H. Brewer, Capital Ward
- Rupert Broadfoot, Rideau Ward
- Walter Cunningham, St. George
- Fred Desjardins, By Ward
- J. A. Forward, Dalhousie Ward
- Edward Gaulin, By Ward
- Fred Hunt, Dalhousie Ward
- Ernest Laroche, Victoria Ward
- William R. Low, Central Ward
- Ernest D. Lowe, Wellington Ward
- Douglas H. Macdonald, Rideau Ward
- William McCaffrey, St. George Ward
- H. H. McElroy, Capital Ward
- James W. McNabb, Wellington Ward
- Patrick Nolan, Victoria Ward
- Charles Allen Snowdon, Central Ward
- Telmond St. Denis, Ottawa Ward

==== 1924 ====
- Henry Watters, mayor (until May 10, 1924)
- Napoléon Champagne, controller (mayor from May 1924)
- Arthur Ellis, controller
- John P. Balharrie, controller
- Charles J. Tulley, controller
- Napoleon Bordeleau, Ottawa Ward
- Sam Crooks, Dalhousie Ward
- Walter Cunningham, St. George
- Fred Desjardins, By Ward
- McGregor Easson, Capital Ward
- Dave Esdale, Rideau Ward
- Fred Hunt, Dalhousie Ward
- Omer Langlois, St. George
- Ernest Laroche, Victoria Ward
- William R. Low, Central Ward
- Ernest D. Lowe, Wellington Ward
- Thomas H. Marcil, Rideau Ward
- Harold D. McCormick, Capital Ward
- James W. McNabb, Wellington Ward
- Patrick Nolan, Victoria Ward
- Joseph Albert Pinard, Ottawa Ward
- Eric Query, By Ward
- Charles Allen Snowdon, Central Ward

==== 1925 ====
- John P. Balharrie, mayor
- Napoléon Champagne, controller
- Charles J. Tulley, controller
- Herbert McElroy, controller
- Frank H. Plant, controller
- Napoleon Bordeleau, Ottawa Ward
- Thomas Brethour, Rideau Ward
- Sam Crooks, Dalhousie Ward
- Walter Cunningham, St. George
- McGregor Easson, Capital Ward
- Dave Esdale, Rideau Ward
- Jim Forward, Dalhousie Ward
- Frank Lafortune, By Ward
- Omer Langlois, St. George
- Ernest Laroche, Victoria Ward
- William R. Low, Central Ward
- Ernest D. Lowe, Wellington Ward
- Harold D. McCormick, Capital Ward
- James W. McNabb, Wellington Ward
- Eric Query, By Ward
- Gerald Sims, Victoria Ward
- Charles Allen Snowdon, Central Ward
- Telmond St. Denis, Ottawa Ward

==== 1926 ====
- John P. Balharrie, mayor
- Arthur Ellis, controller
- Charles J. Tulley, controller
- Herbert McElroy, controller
- Frank H. Plant, controller
- Aristide Belanger, Ottawa Ward
- Thomas Brethour, Rideau Ward
- Sam Crooks, Dalhousie Ward
- Thomas E. Dansereau, St. George Ward
- McGregor Easson, Capital Ward
- David Esdale, Rideau Ward
- Jim Forward, Dalhousie Ward
- Frank LaFortune, By Ward
- Ernest Laroche, Victoria Ward
- William R. Low, Central Ward
- Ernest D. Lowe, Wellington Ward
- Harold D. McCormick, Capital Ward
- James W. McNabb, Wellington Ward
- Hugh J. McNulty, St. George Ward
- J. A. Pinard, Ottawa Ward
- Eric Query, By Ward
- Gerald Sims, Victoria Ward
- Charles Allen Snowdon, Central Ward

==== 1927 ====
- John P. Balharrie, mayor
- Arthur Ellis, controller
- Charles J. Tulley, controller
- Frank LaFortune, controller
- Herbert McElroy, controller
- Aristide Belanger, Ottawa Ward
- Sam Crooks, Dalhousie Ward
- Thomas E. Dansereau, St. George Ward
- Fred Desjardins, By Ward
- McGregor Easson, Capital Ward
- David Esdale, Rideau Ward
- Jim Forward, Dalhousie Ward
- George Mackinley Geldert, Central Ward
- Robert Ingram, Rideau Ward
- Joseph Landriault, Ottawa Ward
- Ernest Laroche, Victoria Ward
- William R. Low, Central Ward
- Ernest D. Lowe, Wellington Ward
- James W. McNabb, Wellington Ward
- George J. O'Connor, St. George Ward
- Eric Query, By Ward
- Gerald Sims, Victoria Ward
- James Warren York, Capital Ward

==== 1928 ====
- Arthur Ellis, mayor
- Frank H. Plant, controller
- Charles J. Tulley, controller
- Frank LaFortune, controller
- Herbert McElroy, controller
- Aristide Belanger, Ottawa Ward
- Tom Brethour, Rideau Ward
- Sam Crooks, Dalhousie Ward
- Walter Cunningham, St. George
- T. E. Dansereau, St. George Ward
- Fred Desjardins, By Ward
- George H. Dunbar, Rideau Ward
- McGregor Easson, Capital Ward
- Jim Forward, Dalhousie Ward
- George Mackinley Geldert, Central Ward
- Nelson J. Lacasse, Victoria Ward
- Joseph Landriault, Ottawa Ward
- Ernest Laroche, Victoria Ward
- William R. Low, Central Ward
- James W. McNabb, Wellington Ward
- J. Edward McVeigh, Wellington Ward
- Joseph Albert Parisien, By Ward
- James Warren York, Capital Ward

==== 1929 ====
- Arthur Ellis, mayor
- Frank H. Plant, controller
- Charles J. Tulley, controller
- Frank LaFortune, controller
- Gerald Sims, controller
- Aristide Belanger, Ottawa Ward
- Tom Brethour, Rideau Ward
- Sam Crooks, Dalhousie Ward
- T. E. Dansereau, St. George Ward
- Fred Desjardins, By Ward
- Jim Forward, Dalhousie Ward
- George Mackinley Geldert, Central Ward
- Nelson J. Lacasse, Victoria Ward
- Ernest Laroche, Victoria Ward
- William R. Low, Central Ward
- Norman H. MacDonald, St. George Ward
- James W. McNabb, Wellington Ward
- J. Edward McVeigh, Wellington Ward
- J. A. Pinard, Ottawa Ward
- Rod Plant, Rideau Ward
- George Pushman, Capital Ward
- Eric Query, By Ward
- James Warren York, Capital Ward

==== 1930 ====
- Frank H. Plant, mayor
- Charles J. Tulley, controller
- Frank LaFortune, controller
- Gerald Sims, controller
- John J. Allen, controller
- Edward Band, Capital Ward
- Aristide Belanger, Ottawa Ward
- Tom Brethour, Rideau Ward
- Sam Crooks, Elmdale Ward
- T. E. Dansereau, St. George Ward
- Clarence M. Denneny, Dalhousie Ward (until Nov. 10)
- Fred Desjardins, By Ward
- Jim Forward, Elmdale Ward
- Nelson J. Lacasse, Victoria Ward
- Ernest Laroche, Victoria Ward
- J. E. Stanley Lewis, Central Ward
- William R. Low, Central Ward
- Norman H. MacDonald, St. George Ward
- Dan McCann, Dalhousie Ward
- James W. McNabb, Wellington Ward
- J. Edward McVeigh, Wellington Ward
- Rod Plant, Rideau Ward
- George Pushman, Riverdale Ward
- Eric Query, By Ward
- George Sloan, Riverdale Ward
- Wilfrid St. Aubin, Ottawa Ward
- James Warren York, Capital Ward

==== 1931 ====
- John J. Allen, mayor
- George Mackinley Geldert, controller
- James Warren York, controller
- J. E. Stanley Lewis, controller
- George H. Dunbar, controller
- Edward Band, Capital Ward
- Kirby Bangs, Central Ward
- Aristide Belanger, Ottawa Ward
- Tom Brethour, Rideau Ward
- Fulgence Charpentier, St. George's Ward
- Sam Crooks, Elmdale Ward
- Fred Desjardins, By Ward
- Jim Forward, Elmdale Ward
- Ernest Laroche, Victoria Ward
- William R. Low, Central Ward
- Norman H. MacDonald, St. George's Ward
- Harold D. Marshall, Capital Ward
- Dan McCann, Dalhousie Ward
- E. P. McGrath, Dalhousie Ward
- James W. McNabb, Wellington Ward
- J. Edward McVeigh, Wellington Ward
- Rod Plant, Rideau Ward
- George Pushman, Riverdale Ward
- Eric Query, By Ward
- George Sloan, Riverdale Ward
- Wilfrid St. Aubin, Ottawa Ward
- John R. Welch, Victoria Ward

==== 1932 ====
- John J. Allen, mayor
- Fulgence Charpentier, controller
- Daniel McCann, controller
- George H. Dunbar, controller
- George Mackinley Geldert, controller
- Edward Band, Capital Ward
- Kirby Bangs, Central Ward
- Aristide Belanger, Ottawa Ward
- Tom Brethour, Rideau Ward
- Fred Desjardins, By Ward
- Jim Forward, Elmdale Ward
- Wilbert Hamilton, Dalhousie Ward
- Nelson J. Lacasse, Victoria Ward
- William R. Low, Central Ward
- Norman H. MacDonald, St. George's Ward
- William H. Marsden, Elmdale Ward
- Harold D. Marshall, Capital Ward
- E. P. McGrath, Dalhousie Ward
- James W. McNabb, Wellington Ward
- J. Edward McVeigh, Wellington Ward
- George J. O'Connor, St. George's Ward
- Joseph Albert Parisien, By Ward
- Rod Plant, Rideau Ward
- George Pushman, Riverdale Ward
- George Sloan, Riverdale Ward
- W. J. St. Aubin, Ottawa Ward
- John R. Welch, Victoria Ward

==== 1933 ====
- John J. Allen, mayor
- Fulgence Charpentier, controller
- George Mackinley Geldert, controller
- George H. Dunbar, controller
- J. E. Stanley Lewis, controller
- Edward Band, Capital Ward
- Kirby Bangs, Central Ward
- Aristide Belanger, Ottawa Ward
- Napoleon A. Bordeleau, Ottawa Ward
- Fred Desjardins, By Ward
- Jim Forward, Elmdale Ward
- Wilbert Hamilton, Dalhousie Ward
- Nelson J. Lacasse, Victoria Ward
- Norman H. MacDonald, St. George's Ward
- William H. Marsden, Elmdale Ward
- Harold D. Marshall, Capital Ward
- E. P. McGrath, Dalhousie Ward
- James W. McNabb, Wellington Ward
- J. Edward McVeigh, Wellington Ward
- Raoul Mercier, By Ward
- Arthur A. Pinard, St. George's Ward
- Rod Plant, Rideau Ward
- George Pushman, Riverdale Ward
- Charles E. Reid, Rideau Ward
- Harold C. Shipman, Central Ward
- George Sloan, Riverdale Ward
- John R. Welch, Victoria Ward

==== 1934 ====
- Patrick Nolan, mayor
- Tom Brethour, controller
- J. E. Stanley Lewis, controller
- George Mackinley Geldert, controller
- Fulgence Charpentier, controller
- Edward Band, Capital Ward
- Kirby Bangs, Central Ward
- Aristide Belanger, Ottawa Ward
- Napoleon A. Bordeleau, Ottawa Ward
- Fred Desjardins, By Ward
- Jim Forward, Elmdale Ward
- Nelson J. Lacasse, Victoria Ward
- Norman H. MacDonald, St. George's Ward
- William H. Marsden, Elmdale Ward
- Harold D. Marshall, Capital Ward
- Daniel McCann, Dalhousie Ward
- David McMillan, Riverdale Ward
- James W. McNabb, Wellington Ward
- James J. McVeigh, Dalhousie Ward
- Joseph Albert Parisien, By Ward
- Arthur A. Pinard, St. George's Ward
- Rod Plant, Rideau Ward
- Harold C. Shipman, Central Ward
- George Sloan, Riverdale Ward
- Wilbert Spearman, Rideau Ward
- Martin M. Walsh, Wellington Ward
- John R. Welch, Victoria Ward

==== 1935 ====
- Patrick Nolan, mayor
- J. E. Stanley Lewis, controller
- George Mackinley Geldert, controller
- J. Edward McVeigh, controller
- Fulgence Charpentier, controller
- Edward Band, Capital Ward
- Aristide Belanger, Ottawa Ward
- Napoleon A. Bordeleau, Ottawa Ward
- A. W. (Fred) Desjardins, By Ward
- Jim Forward, Elmdale Ward
- Wilbert Hamilton, Dalhousie Ward
- Nelson J. Lacasse, Victoria Ward
- Norman H. MacDonald, St. George's Ward
- William H. Marsden, Elmdale Ward
- Harold D. Marshall, Capital Ward
- Daniel McCann, Dalhousie Ward
- David McMillan, Riverdale Ward
- James W. McNabb, Wellington Ward
- Finley McRae, Central Ward
- Joseph P. Nolan, Victoria Ward
- Joseph Albert Parisien, By Ward
- Arthur A. Pinard, St. George's Ward
- Shirley S. Slinn, Rideau Ward
- George Sloan, Riverdale Ward
- Wilbert Spearman, Rideau Ward
- Allan B. Turner, Central Ward
- Martin M. Walsh, Wellington Ward

==== 1936 ====
- J. E. Stanley Lewis, mayor
- George Mackinley Geldert, controller
- George H. Dunbar, controller
- Allan B. Turner, controller
- J. Edward McVeigh, controller
- Arthur J. Ash, Wellington Ward
- Edward Band, Capital Ward
- Aristide Belanger, Ottawa Ward
- Napoleon A. Bordeleau, Ottawa Ward
- James A. Forward, Elmdale Ward
- Wilbert Hamilton, Dalhousie Ward
- Fred Journeaux, Central Ward
- Nelson J. Lacasse, Victoria Ward
- Norman H. MacDonald, St. George's Ward
- William H. Marsden, Elmdale Ward
- Harold D. Marshall, Capital Ward
- Daniel McCann, Dalhousie Ward
- David McMillan, Riverdale Ward
- James W. McNabb, Wellington Ward
- Finley McRae, Central Ward
- Joseph P. Nolan, Victoria Ward
- Joseph Albert Parisien, By Ward
- Arthur A. Pinard, St. George's Ward
- Eric Query, By Ward
- Shirley S. Slinn, Rideau Ward
- George Sloan, Riverdale Ward
- Wilbert Spearman, Rideau Ward

==== 1937 ====
- J. E. Stanley Lewis, mayor
- George Mackinley Geldert, controller
- George H. Dunbar, controller
- Allan B. Turner, controller
- E. A. Bourque, controller
- Arthur J. Ash, Wellington Ward
- Edward Band, Capital Ward
- A. E. Beauchamp, Ottawa Ward
- Aristide Belanger, Ottawa Ward
- James A. Forward, Elmdale Ward
- Fred J. Goodhouse, Rideau Ward
- Wilbert Hamilton, Dalhousie Ward
- Fred Journeaux, Central Ward
- Nelson J. Lacasse, Victoria Ward
- Norman H. MacDonald, St. George's Ward
- William H. Marsden, Elmdale Ward
- Harold D. Marshall, Capital Ward
- Daniel McCann, Dalhousie Ward
- David McMillan, Riverdale Ward
- James W. McNabb, Wellington Ward
- Finley McRae, Central Ward
- Joseph P. Nolan, Victoria Ward
- J. Albert Parisien, By Ward
- Arthur A. Pinard, St. George's Ward
- John Powers, Rideau Ward
- Eric Query, By Ward
- George Sloan, Riverdale Ward

==== 1938 ====
- J. E. Stanley Lewis, mayor
- George Mackinley Geldert, controller
- E. A. Bourque, controller
- J. Edward McVeigh, controller
- Finley McRae, controller
- Joseph Allard, Victoria Ward
- Arthur J. Ash, Wellington Ward
- Edward Band, Capital Ward
- Aristide Belanger, Ottawa Ward
- Napoleon A. Bourdeleau, Ottawa Ward
- James A. Forward, Elmdale Ward
- Fred J. Goodhouse, Rideau Ward
- Wilbert Hamilton, Dalhousie Ward
- Fred Journeaux, Central Ward
- Harold D. Marshall, Capital Ward
- Daniel McCann, Dalhousie Ward
- David McMillan, Riverdale Ward
- Joseph P. Nolan, Victoria Ward
- J. Albert Parisien, By Ward
- George F. Perley, Central Ward
- Arthur A. Pinard, St. George's Ward
- George W. Pingle, Elmdale Ward
- John Powers, Rideau Ward
- Eric Query, By Ward
- George Sloan, Riverdale Ward
- Harold Taylor, St. George's Ward
- Martin M. Walsh, Wellington Ward

==== 1939 ====
- J. E. Stanley Lewis, mayor
- Finley McRae, controller
- George Mackinley Geldert, controller
- E. A. Bourque, controller
- John Harold Putnam, controller
- Arthur J. Ash, Wellington Ward
- Edward Band, Capital Ward
- Aristide Belanger, Ottawa Ward
- Napoleon A. Bourdeleau, Ottawa Ward
- Henry Bradley, Elmdale Ward
- Fred J. Goodhouse, Rideau Ward
- Wilbert Hamilton, Dalhousie Ward
- Fred Journeaux, Central Ward
- Nelson J. Lacasse, Victoria Ward
- Daniel McCann, Dalhousie Ward
- David McMillan, Riverdale Ward
- Joseph P. Nolan, Victoria Ward
- J. Albert Parisien, By Ward
- George F. Perley, Central Ward
- Chester E. Pickering, Capital Ward
- Arthur A. Pinard, St. George's Ward
- George W. Pingle, Elmdale Ward
- John Powers, Rideau Ward
- Eric Query, By Ward
- George Sloan, Riverdale Ward
- Harold Taylor, St. George's Ward
- Martin M. Walsh, Wellington Ward

==== 1940 ====
- J. E. Stanley Lewis, mayor
- E. A. Bourque, controller
- George Mackinley Geldert, controller
- Jim Forward, controller
- John Harold Putnam, controller
- Arthur J. Ash, Wellington Ward
- Edward Band, Capital Ward
- Aristide Belanger, Ottawa Ward
- Napoleon A. Bourdeleau, Ottawa Ward
- Henry Bradley, Elmdale Ward
- Len Coulter, Riverdale Ward
- Wilbert Hamilton, Dalhousie Ward
- Hamnett P. Hill Jr., St. George's Ward
- Fred Journeaux, Central Ward
- Nelson J. Lacasse, Victoria Ward
- Daniel McCann, Dalhousie Ward
- David McMillan, Riverdale Ward
- Joseph P. Nolan, Victoria Ward
- J. Albert Parisien, By Ward
- George F. Perley, Central Ward
- Chester E. Pickering, Capital Ward
- Arthur A. Pinard, St. George's Ward
- John Powers, Rideau Ward
- Eric Query, By Ward
- Wilbert Spearman, Rideau Ward
- David Sprague, Elmdale Ward
- Martin M. Walsh, Wellington Ward

==== 1941–1942 ====
- J. E. Stanley Lewis, mayor
- Chester E. Pickering, controller
- George Mackinley Geldert, controller
- E. A. Bourque, controller
- Jim Forward, controller
- Arthur J. Ash, Wellington Ward
- Edward Band, Capital Ward
- Aristide Belanger, Ottawa Ward
- Napoleon A. Bourdeleau, Ottawa Ward
- Henry Bradley, Elmdale Ward
- Len Coulter, Riverdale Ward
- Wilbert Hamilton, Dalhousie Ward
- Fred Journeaux, Central Ward
- Nelson J. Lacasse, Victoria Ward
- Daniel McCann, Dalhousie Ward
- Joseph McCulloch, Capital Ward
- David McMillan, Riverdale Ward
- Joseph P. Nolan, Victoria Ward
- J. Albert Parisien, By Ward
- George F. Perley, Central Ward
- Arthur A. Pinard, St. George's Ward
- John Powers, Rideau Ward
- George W. Pingle, Elmdale Ward
- Eric Query, By Ward
- Wilbert Spearman, Rideau Ward
- Harold Taylor, St. George's Ward
- Martin M. Walsh, Wellington Ward

==== 1943–1944 ====
- J. E. Stanley Lewis, mayor
- George Mackinley Geldert, controller
- Finley McRae, controller
- E. A. Bourque, controller
- Grenville Goodwin, controller
- Leslie G. Avery, Rideau Ward
- Edward Band, Capital Ward
- Aristide Belanger, Ottawa Ward
- Napoleon A. Bourdeleau, Ottawa Ward
- Henry Bradley, Elmdale Ward
- S. H. Chandler, Wellington Ward
- Len Coulter, Riverdale Ward
- Wilbert Hamilton, Dalhousie Ward
- J. M. Laframboise, By Ward (appointed March 15, 1943)
- Daniel McCann, Dalhousie Ward
- Joseph McCulloch, Capital Ward
- David McMillan, Riverdale Ward
- Joseph P. Nolan, Victoria Ward
- J. Albert Parisien, By Ward (died March 2, 1943)
- Charles Parker, Wellington Ward
- George F. Perley, Central Ward
- Arthur A. Pinard, St. George's Ward
- John Powers, Rideau Ward
- George W. Pingle, Elmdale Ward
- Eric Query, By Ward
- J. Grant Shaw, Central Ward
- Paul Tardif, Victoria Ward
- Harold Taylor, St. George's Ward

==== 1945–1946 ====
- J. E. Stanley Lewis, mayor
- Grenville Goodwin, controller
- George Mackinley Geldert, controller
- Finley McRae, controller
- E. A. Bourque, controller
- Leslie G. Avery, Rideau Ward
- Edward Band, Capital Ward
- Aristide Belanger, Ottawa Ward
- Napoleon A. Bourdeleau, Ottawa Ward
- Henry Bradley, Elmdale Ward
- Len Coulter, Riverdale Ward
- Roy Donaldson, St. George's Ward
- Frank Ellis, Victoria Ward
- Wilbert Hamilton, Dalhousie Ward
- Fred Journeaux, Central Ward
- Daniel McCann, Dalhousie Ward
- Joseph McCulloch, Capital Ward
- David McMillan, Riverdale Ward
- Jules Morin, By Ward
- Charles Parker, Wellington Ward
- Arthur A. Pinard, St. George's Ward
- John Powers, Rideau Ward
- George W. Pingle, Elmdale Ward
- Eric Query, By Ward
- J. Grant Shaw, Central Ward
- Paul Tardif, Victoria Ward
- Martin M. Walsh, Wellington Ward

==== 1947–1948 ====
- J. E. Stanley Lewis, mayor
- Grenville Goodwin, controller
- E. A. Bourque, controller
- George Mackinley Geldert, controller
- Finley McRae, controller
- Clem Aubin, Ottawa Ward
- Leslie G. Avery, Rideau Ward
- Edward Band, Capital Ward
- Henry Bradley, Elmdale Ward
- Len Coulter, Riverdale Ward
- Roy Donaldson, St. George's Ward
- Frank Ellis, Victoria Ward
- Wilbert Hamilton, Dalhousie Ward
- Fred Journeaux, Central Ward
- Daniel McCann, Dalhousie Ward
- Joseph McCulloch, Capital Ward
- David McMillan, Riverdale Ward
- Jules Morin, By Ward
- William Newton, St. George's Ward
- Charles Parker, Wellington Ward
- John Powers, Rideau Ward
- George W. Pingle, Elmdale Ward
- Eric Query, By Ward
- Henri Rheaume, Ottawa Ward
- J. Grant Shaw, Central Ward
- Paul Tardif, Victoria Ward
- Martin M. Walsh, Wellington Ward

==== 1949–1950 ====
- E. A. Bourque, mayor
- Len Coulter, controller
- Dan McCann, controller
- Paul Tardif, controller
- Chester E. Pickering, controller
- Joseph Allard, Victoria Ward
- Clem Aubin, Ottawa Ward
- Leslie G. Avery, Rideau Ward
- Edward Band, Capital Ward
- Aristide Belanger, Ottawa Ward
- Frank Boyce, Carleton Ward (1950)
- Henry Bradley, Elmdale Ward
- Frank Ellis, Victoria Ward
- Wilbert Hamilton, Dalhousie Ward
- Howard Henry, Carleton Ward (1950)
- Victor Irish, Riverdale Ward
- Ernie Jones, Westboro Ward (1950)
- Fred Journeaux, Central Ward
- James McAuley, Dalhousie Ward
- David McMillan, Riverdale Ward
- Jules Morin, By Ward
- Archie Newman, Gloucester Ward (1950)
- William Newton, St. George's Ward
- Noel Ogilvie, Capital Ward
- Charles Parker, Wellington Ward
- Harry Parslow, Westboro Ward (1950)
- John Powers, Rideau Ward
- Eric Query, By Ward
- Alex Roger, Gloucester Ward (1950)
- J. Grant Shaw, Central Ward
- Charles St. Germain, St. George's Ward
- Roly Wall, Elmdale Ward
- Martin M. Walsh, Wellington Ward

==== 1951–1952 ====
- Grenville Goodwin, mayor (January 1, 1951 – August 27, 1951)
- Charlotte Whitton, controller (1951); mayor (October 1, 1951 – 1952)
- Len Coulter, controller
- Dan McCann, controller
- Paul Tardif, controller
- Joseph Allard, Victoria Ward
- Clem Aubin, Ottawa Ward
- Leslie G. Avery, Rideau Ward
- Frank Boyce, Carleton Ward
- Henry Bradley, Elmdale Ward
- Lon Campbell, Victoria Ward
- Parlane Christie, Capital Ward
- Pat Doherty, Gloucester Ward
- Wilbert Hamilton, Dalhousie Ward
- Howard Henry, Carleton Ward
- Ernie Jones, Westboro Ward
- Fred Journeaux, Central Ward
- Cy Marshall, Central Ward (May 27, 1952 – December 31, 1952)
- James McAuley, Dalhousie Ward
- David McMillan, Riverdale Ward
- Jules Morin, By Ward
- Archie Newman, Gloucester Ward
- William Newton, St. George's Ward
- Noel Ogilvie, Capital Ward
- Charles Parker, Wellington Ward
- Harry Parslow, Westboro Ward
- John Powers, Rideau Ward (1951); controller (October 11, 1951 – 1952)
- Eric Query, By Ward
- Henri Rheaume, Ottawa Ward
- Alex Roger, Rideau Ward (October 22, 1951 – 1952)
- J. Grant Shaw, Central Ward (1951-April 9, 1952)
- George Sloan, Riverdale Ward
- Charles St. Germain, St. George's Ward
- Roly Wall, Elmdale Ward
- Martin M. Walsh, Wellington Ward

==== 1953–1954 ====
- Charlotte Whitton, mayor
- Dan McCann, controller (1953-September 8, 1954)
- Paul Tardif, controller
- Roy Donaldson, controller
- John Powers, controller
- Clem Aubin, Ward 2 (By)
- Frank Boyce, Ward 9 (Carleton)
- Henry Bradley, Ward 7 (Elmdale-Victoria)
- Lon Campbell, Ward 8 (Queensboro)
- Jim Groves, Ward 1 (Rideau)
- Wilbert Hamilton, Ward 6 (Dalhousie)
- Howard Henry, Ward 9 (Carleton)
- Fred Journeaux, Ward 4 (Wellington)
- James McAuley, Ward 6 (Dalhousie)
- Jules Morin, Ward 2 (By)
- William Newton, Ward 3 (St. George's)
- Noel Ogilvie, Ward 5 (Capital)
- Harry Parslow, Ward 8 (Queensboro)
- Alex Roger, Ward 1 (Rideau)
- George Sloan, Ward 5 (Capital)
- Charlie St. Germain, Ward 3 (St. George's)
- Roly Wall, Ward 7 (Elmdale-Victoria)
- Martin M. Walsh, Ward 4 (Wellington)

==== 1955–1956 ====
- Charlotte Whitton, mayor
- George Nelms, controller
- Paul Tardif, controller
- Roy Donaldson, controller
- Ernie Jones, controller
- Clem Aubin, Ward 2 (By)
- Richard Barber, Ward 8 (Queensboro)
- Frank Boyce, Ward 9 (Carleton)
- Henry Bradley, Ward 7 (Elmdale-Victoria)
- Lon Campbell, Ward 8 (Queensboro)
- Pat Doherty, Ward 1 (Rideau)
- James A. Donaldson, Ward 5 (Capital)
- Jim Groves, Ward 1 (Rideau)
- Wilbert Hamilton, Ward 6 (Dalhousie)
- Howard Henry, Ward 9 (Carleton)
- James McAuley, Ward 6 (Dalhousie)
- Jules Morin, Ward 2 (By)
- May Nickson, Ward 3 (St. George's)
- Noel Ogilvie, Ward 5 (Capital)
- Donald Bartlett Reid, Ward 4 (Wellington)
- Robert E. Robinson, Ward 4 (Wellington) (1955–1956)
- Charlie St. Germain, Ward 3 (St. George's)
- Roly Wall, Ward 7 (Elmdale-Victoria)
- Martin M. Walsh, Ward 4 (Wellington) (January 1, 1955 – August 11, 1955)

==== 1957–1958 ====
- George H. Nelms, mayor
- Paul Tardif, controller
- Ernie Jones, controller
- Wilbert Hamilton, controller
- Sam Berger, controller
- Clem Aubin, By Ward
- Richard Barber, Queensboro Ward
- Frank Boyce, Carleton Ward
- Henry Bradley, Elmdale-Victoria Ward
- Lon Campbell, Queensboro Ward
- Pat Doherty, Gloucester Ward
- Jim Groves, Rideau Ward
- Howard Henry, Carleton Ward
- James McAuley, Dalhousie Ward
- Jules Morin, By Ward
- May Nickson, St. George's Ward
- Lionel O'Connor, Wellington Ward
- Noel Ogilvie, Capital Ward
- Charles Parker, Dalhousie Ward
- Donald Bartlett Reid, Wellington Ward
- Alex Roger, Gloucester Ward
- George Sloan, Capital Ward
- Charlie St. Germain, St. George's
- Roly Wall, Elmdale-Victoria Ward
- J. D. Wentzell, Rideau Ward

==== 1959–1960 members ====
- George H. Nelms, mayor
- Paul Tardif, controller
- Ernie Jones, controller
- Sam Berger, controller
- Wilbert Hamilton, controller
- Don Armstrong, Capital Ward
- Clem Aubin, By Ward
- Henry Bradley, Elmdale-Victoria Ward
- Lon Campbell, Queensboro Ward
- Lloyd Francis, Carleton Ward
- Jim Groves, Rideau Ward
- Murray Heit, Gloucester Ward
- Howard Henry, Carleton Ward
- James McAuley, Dalhousie Ward
- Jules Morin, By Ward
- May Nickson, St. George's Ward (until March 15, 1960)
- Lionel O'Connor, Wellington Ward
- Cecile O'Regan, St. George's Ward (from March 30, 1960)
- Charles Parker, Dalhousie Ward
- Alex Roger, Gloucester Ward
- Donald Bartlett Reid, Wellington Ward
- George Sloan, Capital Ward
- Charlie St. Germain, St. George's
- Roly Wall, Elmdale-Victoria Ward
- Jessen Wentzell, Rideau Ward
- Ken Workman, Queensboro Ward

==== 1961–1962 members ====
- Charlotte Whitton, mayor
- Lloyd Francis, controller
- Donald Bartlett Reid, controller
- Paul Tardif, controller
- Wilbert Hamilton, controller (until Nov. 2, 1962)
- Don Armstrong, Capital Ward
- Clem Aubin, By Ward
- Claude Bennett, Capital Ward
- Frank Boyce, Carleton Ward
- David R. Dehler, St. George's Ward
- Pat Doherty, Gloucester Ward
- Kenneth Hubert Fogarty, Queensboro Ward
- Bruce Harvey, Elmdale-Victoria Ward
- Murray Heit, Gloucester Ward
- Howard Henry, Carleton Ward
- James McAuley, Dalhousie Ward
- Jules Morin, By Ward
- Lionel O'Connor, Wellington Ward
- John Powers, Rideau Ward (from May 17, 1962)
- Charles Parker, Dalhousie Ward
- Bob Simpson, Wellington Ward
- Charlie St. Germain, St. George's
- Roly Wall, Elmdale-Victoria Ward
- Ellen Webber, Rideau Ward
- Jessen Wentzell, Rideau Ward (1961–April 30, 1962)
- Ken Workman, Queensboro Ward

==== 1963–1964 members ====
- Charlotte Whitton, mayor
- Lloyd Francis, controller (until May 20, 1963)
- Donald Bartlett Reid, controller
- Ellen Webber, controller
- Ernie Jones, controller
- Don Armstrong, Capital Ward
- Des Bender, Rideau Ward
- Claude Bennett, Capital Ward
- Ralph Brunet, By Ward
- Frank Boyce, Carleton Ward
- David Dehler, St. George's Ward
- Kenneth Hubert Fogarty, Queensboro Ward
- Bruce Harvey, Elmdale-Victoria Ward
- Murray Heit, Gloucester Ward
- Howard Henry, Carleton Ward
- Don Kay, Gloucester Ward
- James McAuley, Dalhousie Ward
- Jules Morin, By Ward (1963); Controller (May 22, 1963-1964)
- Lionel O'Connor, Wellington Ward
- Cecile O'Regan, By Ward (June 3, 1963-1964)
- Charles Parker, Dalhousie Ward
- John Powers, Rideau Ward
- Bob Simpson, Wellington Ward (1963)
- Ivan Sparks, Wellington Ward (1963–1964)
- Charlie St. Germain, St. George's
- Roly Wall, Elmdale-Victoria Ward
- Ken Workman, Queensboro Ward

==== 1965–1966 members ====
- Donald Bartlett Reid, mayor
- Kenneth Fogarty, controller
- Ernie Jones, controller
- Ellen Webber, controller
- Murray Heit, controller
- Don Armstrong, Capital Ward
- Des Bender, Rideau Ward
- Claude Bennett, Capital Ward
- Ralph Brunet, By Ward
- Pat Doherty, Gloucester Ward
- Maurice Egan, Carleton Ward
- Mary Harrison, Wellington Ward
- Bruce Harvey, Elmdale-Victoria Ward
- Howard Henry, Carleton Ward
- Don Kay, Gloucester Ward
- James McAuley, Dalhousie Ward
- Jules Morin, By Ward
- Lionel O'Connor, Wellington Ward
- Cecile O'Regan, St. George's Ward
- Charles Parker, Dalhousie Ward
- John Powers, Rideau Ward
- Charlie St. Germain, St. George's Ward
- Harold Waddell, Queensboro Ward
- Roly Wall, Elmdale-Victoria Ward
- Ken Workman, Queensboro Ward

==== 1967–1969 members ====
- Donald Bartlett Reid, mayor
- Kenneth Fogarty, controller
- Ellen Webber, controller
- Murray Heit, controller
- Ernie Jones, controller
- Des Bender, Rideau Ward
- Claude Bennett, Capital Ward
- Pierre Benoit, Alta Vista Ward
- Ralph Brunet, By Ward
- Rudy Capogreco, Dalhousie Ward
- Pat Doherty, Dalhousie Ward (1968–1969)
- Maurice Egan, Carleton Ward (1967)
- Lloyd Francis, Carleton Ward (1968–1969)
- Lorry Greenberg, Wellington Ward (1968–1969)
- Mary Harrison, Wellington Ward
- Bruce Harvey, Elmdale-Victoria Ward
- Howard Henry, Carleton Ward
- Don Kay, Alta Vista Ward
- Jim Knubley, Gloucester Ward
- James McAuley, Dalhousie Ward (1967–1968)
- Jules Morin, By Ward
- Lionel O'Connor, Wellington Ward (1967–1968)
- John Powers, Rideau Ward
- Rhéal Robert, St. George's Ward
- Charlie St. Germain, St. George's Ward
- Joe Quinn, Gloucester Ward
- Harold Waddell, Queensboro Ward
- Roly Wall, Elmdale-Victoria Ward
- Charlotte Whitton, Capital Ward
- Ken Workman, Queensboro Ward

==== 1970–1972 members ====
- Kenneth Hubert Fogarty, mayor (1970 – April 4, 1972)
- Claude Bennett, controller (1970 – August 28, 1972)
- Pierre Benoit, controller; appointed mayor April 24, 1972
- Lorry Greenberg, controller
- Ernie Jones, controller
- Des Bender, Rideau Ward
- Ralph Brunet, By Ward
- Rudy Capogreco, Dalhousie Ward
- Michael Cassidy, Wellington Ward (1970 – September 1, 1972)
- Pat Doherty, Gloucester Ward
- Garry Guzzo, Capital Ward; appointed controller May 1972
- Don Kay, Alta Vista Ward
- Gale Kerwin, Dalhousie Ward
- Jeffrey King, Alta Vista Ward
- Bill Law, Carleton Ward
- Tom McDougall, Rideau Ward; appointed controller September 5, 1972
- Matt McGrath, Wellington Ward
- Jules Morin, By Ward
- Ed Mulkins, Queensboro Ward (1970–1972)
- Joe Quinn, Gloucester Ward
- Rhéal Robert, St. George's Ward
- Walter Ryan, Elmdale-Victoria Ward
- Charlie St. Germain, St. George's Ward
- Ralph Sutherland, Carleton Ward
- Harold Waddell, Queensboro Ward (1970)
- Roly Wall, Elmdale-Victoria Ward
- Charlotte Whitton, Capital Ward
- Ken Workman, Queensboro Ward

==== 1973–1974 members ====
- Pierre Benoit, mayor
- Lorry Greenberg, controller
- Garry Guzzo, controller
- Tom McDougall, controller
- Ernie Jones, controller
- Joe Cassey, Wellington Ward
- Marion Dewar, Britannia Ward
- Don Kay, Alta Vista Ward
- Gale Kerwin, Dalhousie Ward
- Bill Law, Carleton Ward
- Don Lockhart, Capital Ward
- Jules Morin, By-St. George's Ward
- Ed Mulkins, Queensboro Ward
- Joe Quinn, Gloucester Ward
- Rhéal Robert, Rideau Ward
- Walter Ryan, Elmdale-Victoria Ward

==== 1975–1976 members ====
- Lorry Greenberg, mayor
- Marion Dewar, controller
- Donald Bartlett Reid, controller
- Garry Guzzo, controller
- Bill Law, controller
- Georges Bédard, By-St. George's Ward
- Brian Bourns, Wellington Ward
- Sandy Boyce, Britannia Ward
- Rolf Hasenack, Dalhousie Ward
- Don Kay, Alta Vista Ward
- Toddy Kehoe, Carleton Ward
- Trip Kennedy, Queensboro Ward
- Don Lockhart, Capital Ward
- Pat Nicol, Elmdale-Victoria Ward
- Joe Quinn, Gloucester Ward
- Rhéal Robert, Rideau Ward

==== 1977–1978 members ====
- Lorry Greenberg, mayor
- Marion Dewar, controller
- Donald Bartlett Reid, controller
- Pat Nicol, controller
- Ralph Sutherland, controller
- Georges Bédard, By-St. George's Ward
- Brian Bourns, Wellington Ward
- Joe Cassey, Capital Ward
- Marlene Catterall, Britannia Ward
- Rolf Hasenack, Dalhousie Ward
- Don Kay, Alta Vista Ward
- Toddy Kehoe, Carleton Ward
- Trip Kennedy, Queensboro Ward
- Joe Quinn, Gloucester Ward
- Rhéal Robert, Rideau Ward
- Roly Wall, Elmdale-Victoria Ward

==== 1978–1980 members ====
- Marion Dewar, mayor
- Donald Bartlett Reid, controller
- Brian Bourns, controller
- Bill Law, controller
- Ralph Sutherland, controller
- Georges Bédard, By-St. George's Ward
- Joe Cassey, Wellington Ward
- Marlene Catterall, Britannia Ward
- Chris Chilton, Elmdale-Victoria Ward
- Rolf Hasenack, Dalhousie Ward
- Don Kay, Alta Vista Ward
- Toddy Kehoe, Carleton Ward
- Trip Kennedy, Queensboro Ward
- Michele Mackinnon, Capital Ward
- Joe Quinn, Gloucester Ward
- Rhéal Robert, Rideau Ward

==== 1980–1982 members ====
- Marion Dewar, mayor
- Graham Bird, Elmdale Ward
- Brian Bourns, Billings Ward
- Joe Cassey, Wellington Ward
- Marlene Catterall, Britannia Ward
- Terrance Denison, Queensboro Ward
- James Durrell, Riverside Ward
- Rolf Hasenack, Dalhousie Ward
- Toddy Kehoe, Carleton Ward
- Darrel Kent, Canterbury Ward
- Marc Laviolette, By-Rideau Ward
- Greg MacDougall, Alta Vista Ward
- Donald Bartlett Reid, Richmond Ward
- Rhéal Robert, Overbrook-Forbes Ward
- Howard Smith, Capital Ward
- Nancy Smith, St. George's Ward

==== 1982–1985 members ====
- Marion Dewar, mayor
- Graham Bird, Elmdale Ward
- Brian Bourns, Billings Ward
- Marlene Catterall, Britannia Ward
- Terrance Denison, Queensboro Ward
- James Durrell, Riverside Ward
- Rolf Hasenack, Dalhousie Ward
- Diane Holmes, Wellington Ward
- Jacquelin Holzman, Richmond Ward
- Toddy Kehoe, Carleton Ward
- Marc Laviolette, By-Rideau Ward
- Greg MacDougall, Alta Vista Ward
- Michael McSweeney, Canterbury Ward
- Rhéal Robert, Overbrook-Forbes Ward
- Howard Smith, Capital Ward
- Nancy Smith, St. George's Ward

==== 1985–1988 members ====
- James Durrell, Mayor
- George Brown, Riverside Ward
- Jamie Fisher, Elmdale Ward
- Mac Harb, Dalhousie Ward
- Diane Holmes, Wellington Ward
- Jacquelin Holzman, Richmond Ward
- George Kelly, Overbrook-Forbes Ward
- Darrel Kent, Alta Vista Ward
- Marc Laviolette, By-Rideau Ward
- Mark Maloney, Queensboro Ward
- Michael McSweeney, Canterbury Ward
- Bob Morrison, Carleton Ward
- Joan O'Neill, Billings ward
- Rob Quinn, Capital Ward
- Nancy Smith, St. George's Ward
- Ruth Wildgen, Britannia Ward

==== 1988–1991 members ====
- James Durrell, Mayor (1988–1991)
- Marc Laviolette, Mayor (1991)
- Pierre Bourque, By-Rideau Ward (Appointed March 4, 1991)
- George Brown, Riverside Ward
- Jamie Fisher, Elmdale Ward
- Peter Harris, Dalhousie Ward (1988– September 11, 1989)*
- Diane Holmes, Wellington Ward
- Jacquelin Holzman, Richmond Ward
- Michael Janigan, Dalhousie Ward (September 12–20, 1989; November 23, 1989 – 1991)*
- Jim Jones, Britannia Ward
- Tim Kehoe, Carleton Ward
- George Kelly, Overbrook-Forbes Ward
- Darrel Kent, Alta Vista Ward
- Marc Laviolette, By-Rideau Ward (1988-Feb. 1991)
- Mark Maloney, Queensboro Ward
- Michael McSweeney, Canterbury Ward
- Joan O'Neill, Billings Ward
- Nancy Smith, St. George's Ward
- Lynn Smyth, Capital Ward

* After a judge overturned the election result, a special election was held in 1989.

==== 1991–1994 members ====
- Jacquelin Holzman, Mayor
- George Brown, Riverside Ward
- Jill Brown, Britannia Ward
- Richard Cannings, By-Rideau Ward
- Alex Cullen, Richmond Ward
- Peter Harris, Dalhousie Ward
- Mary Hegan, Carlington-Westboro Ward (appointed; June 15, 1994 – December 1, 1994)
- Diane Holmes, Wellington Ward
- Peter Hume, Alta Vista Ward
- Tim Kehoe, Carleton Ward
- Jacques Legendre, Overbrook-Forbes Ward
- Jack MacKinnon, Canterbury Ward
- Mark Maloney, Carlington-Westboro Ward (1991 – June 10, 1994)
- Nancy Mitchell, St. George's Ward
- Joan O'Neill, Billings Ward
- Jim Watson, Capital Ward
- Joan Wong, Elmdale Ward

==== 1994–1997 members ====
- Jacquelin Holzman, Mayor
- Elisabeth Arnold, Somerset Ward
- Richard Cannings, Rideau Ward
- Diane Deans, Southgate Ward
- Stéphane Émard-Chabot, Bruyère-Strathcona Ward
- Allan Higdon, Alta Vista-Canterbury Ward
- Karin Howard, Mooney's Bay Ward
- Ron Kolbus, Britannia-Richmond Ward
- Brian Mackey, Carleton Ward
- Jim Watson, Capital Ward
- Joan Wong, Kitchissippi

==== 1997–2000 members ====
- Jim Watson, Mayor
- Elisabeth Arnold, Somerset
- Inez Berg, Capital
- Jim Bickford, Mooney's Bay Ward (April 21, 1999 – 2000)
- Richard Cannings, Rideau
- Diane Deans, Southgate Ward
- Stéphane Émard-Chabot, Bruyère-Strathcona Ward
- Allan Higdon, Alta Vista-Canterbury Ward
- Karin Howard, Mooney's Bay Ward (1997 – February 3, 1999)
- Ron Kolbus, Britannia-Richmond Ward
- Shawn Little, Kitchissippi
- Brian Mackey, Carleton Ward

== City Halls ==
- First City Hall (Ottawa) 1849–1877 – now site of National Arts Centre
- Second City Hall (Ottawa) 1877–1931
- Transportation Building (Ottawa) 1931–1958
- John G. Diefenbaker Building 1958–2000
- Ottawa City Hall 2000–

== See also ==
- List of Ottawa municipal elections
- Ottawa Board of Control
- List of mayors of Ottawa
- Regional Municipality of Ottawa-Carleton
