= List of mayors of Ottawa =

The following is a list of mayors of Ottawa. Until 1854, Ottawa was known as Bytown. Over the course of Ottawa's history, the borders of the municipality have greatly expanded through annexations. This most recently occurred in 2001 when a number of neighbouring communities were amalgamated with Ottawa.

== Bytown ==
- 1847 – John Scott
- 1848 – John Bower Lewis
- 1849 – Robert Hervey
- 1850 – John Scott
- 1851 – Charles Sparrow
- 1852 – Richard William Scott
- 1853 – Joseph-Balsora Turgeon
- 1854 – Henry J. Friel

== Ottawa, pre-amalgamation (1855–2001) ==
- 1855–1857 – John Bower Lewis
- 1858–1859 – Edward McGillivray
- 1860–1862 – Alexander Workman
- 1863 – Henry J. Friel
- 1864–1866 – Moss Kent Dickinson
- 1867 – Robert Lyon
- 1868–1869 – Henry J. Friel
- 1870–1871 – John Rochester
- 1872–1873 – Eugène Martineau
- 1874–1875 – John Peter Featherston
- 1876 – G. B. Lyon-Fellowes
- 1876–1877 – William Henry Waller
- 1878 – Chauncey Ward Bangs
- 1879–1881 – Charles Herbert Mackintosh
- 1882–1883 – Pierre St. Jean, M.D.
- 1884 – Charles Thornton Bate
- 1885–1886 – Francis McDougal
- 1887–1888 – McLeod Stewart
- 1889–1890 – Jacob Erratt
- 1891 – Thomas Birkett
- 1892–1893 – Olivier Durocher
- 1894 – George Cox
- 1895–1896 – William Borthwick
- 1897–1898 – Samuel Bingham
- 1899–1900 – Thomas Payment
- 1901 – William Dowler Morris
- 1901 – James Davidson
- 1902–1903 – Fred Cook
- 1904–1906 – James A. Ellis
- 1906 – Robert A. Hastey
- 1907–1908 – D'Arcy Scott
- 1908 – Napoléon Champagne
- 1909–1912 – Charles Hopewell
- 1912 – Edward H. Hinchey
- 1913 – James A. Ellis
- 1914 – Taylor McVeity
- 1915–1916 – Nelson D. Porter
- 1917–1920 – Harold Fisher
- 1921–1923 – Frank H. Plant
- 1924 – Henry Watters
- 1924 – Napoléon Champagne
- 1925–1927 – John P. Balharrie
- 1928–1929 – Arthur Ellis
- 1930 – Frank H. Plant
- 1931–1933 – John J. Allen
- 1934–1935 – Patrick Nolan
- 1936–1948 – J.E. Stanley Lewis
- 1949–1950 – E.A. Bourque
- 1951 – Grenville Goodwin
- 1951–1956 – Charlotte Whitton
- 1957–1960 – George H. Nelms
- 1961–1964 – Charlotte Whitton
- 1965–1969 – Donald Bartlett Reid
- 1970–1972 – Kenneth H. Fogarty, Q.C.
- 1972–1974 – Pierre Benoit
- 1975–1978 – Lorry Greenberg
- 1978–1985 – Marion Dewar
- 1985–1991 – James A. Durrell
- 1991 – Marc Laviolette
- 1991–1997 – Jacquelin Holzman
- 1997–2000 – Jim Watson
- 2000–2001 – Allan Higdon (acting)

== Amalgamation ==
When the city of Ottawa amalgamated in 2001, these were the mayors of the municipalities that amalgamated:

- Chair of the Regional Municipality of Ottawa–Carleton: Bob Chiarelli
- Ottawa: Allan Higdon (acting)
- Gloucester: Claudette Cain
- Kanata: Merle Nicholds
- Nepean: Mary Pitt
- Vanier: Guy Cousineau
- Cumberland: Gerry Lalonde (acting)
- Goulbourn: Janet Stavinga
- Osgoode: Doug Thompson
- Rideau: Glenn Brooks
- West Carleton: Dwight Eastman
- Rockcliffe Park: Patrick J. Murray

== Since amalgamation (2001–present) ==
No.	Photo	Mayor	Terms of office	Took office	Left office
57		Bob Chiarelli	2	January 1, 2001	December 1, 2006
58		Larry O'Brien	1	December 1, 2006	November 30, 2010
—		Michel Bellemare (acting)	— (Note: Bellemare and Thompson served as acting mayor during O'Brien's leave of absence, due to criminal charges before the court.)	May 2, 2009	July 8, 2009
—		Doug Thompson (acting)	—	July 8, 2009	August 6, 2009
56 (Note: Watson previously served as mayor of the Old City of Ottawa from 1997 to 2000)		Jim Watson	4	December 1, 2010	November 15, 2022
59		Mark Sutcliffe	1	November 15, 2022	Incumbent

== See also ==
- List of Ottawa municipal elections
- Mayors of Osgoode Township
