= Eugène Martineau =

Eugène Martineau may refer to:

- Eugène Martineau (politician) (1837–1880), Ottawa mayor
- Eugène Martineau (athlete) (born 1980), decathlete from the Netherlands
