= 1929 Ottawa municipal election =

Canadian municipal election

The city of Ottawa, Canada held municipal elections on December 2, 1929, to elect members of the 1930 Ottawa City Council.

== Mayor of Ottawa ==
Controller Frank H. Plant was elected mayor without opposition.

Candidate	Votes	%
Frank H. Plant	Acclaimed	

== Ottawa Board of Control ==
All three incumbent controllers were re-elected. Businessman John J. Allen was the only newcomer elected.

(4 elected)

Candidate	Votes	%
Charles J. Tulley (X)	12,057	16.83
Frank LaFortune (X)	11,628	16.23
Gerald Sims (X)	11,455	15.99
John J. Allen	11,172	15.59
G. M. Geldert	11,135	15.54
George H. Dunbar	8,590	11.99
S. Rupert Broadfoot	5,620	7.84

== Ottawa City Council ==
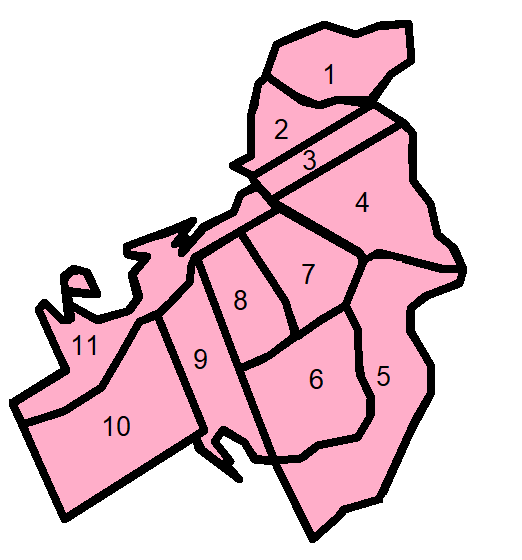
Map of Ottawa's Wards used in this election: 1. Rideau Ward; 2. Ottawa Ward; 3. By Ward; 4. St. George's Ward; 5. Riverdale Ward; 6. Capital Ward; 7. Central Ward; 8. Wellington Ward; 9. Dalhousie Ward; 10. Elmdale Ward; 11. Victoria Ward

All incumbent alderman who ran were re-elected. Two new wards were created for this election, Elmdale in the city's west end, and Riverdale in the city's south. The incumbent aldermen from Dalhousie both ran in Elmdale. One of the incumbent aldermen from Capital Ward (George Pushman) ran in Riverdale.

(2 elected from each ward)

Rideau Ward
Candidate	Votes	%
Rod Plant (X)	820	38.95
Thomas Brethour (X)	748	35.53
John C. Grant	329	15.63
Robert S. M. Hood	208	9.88

By Ward
Candidate	Votes	%
A. W. Desjardins (X)	Acclaimed	
Eric Query (X)	Acclaimed	

St. George Ward
Candidate	Votes	%
T. E. Dansereau (X)	1,652	37.72
Norman H. MacDonald (X)	1,420	32.42
Walter Cunningham	1,308	29.86

Wellington Ward
Candidate	Votes	%
James W. McNabb (X)	1,955	44.46
J. Edward McVeigh (X)	1,715	39.00
A. M. Muir	727	16.53

Capital Ward
Candidate	Votes	%
John Warren York (X)	2,215	39.43
Edward Band (politician)\	1,899	33.81
R. Hooper	1,503	26.76

Dalhousie Ward
Candidate	Votes	%
Clarence M. Denneny	1,247	24.81
Dan McCann	1,176	23.40
W. A. Balharrie	774	15.40
Robert A. Stokes	664	13.21
Freeman Rowe	543	10.80
W. E. O'Meara	412	8.20
W. S. McFall	210	4.18

Elmdale Ward
Candidate	Votes	%
Sam Crooks (X)	Acclaimed	
Jim Forward (X)	Acclaimed	

Victoria Ward
Candidate	Votes	%
Ernest Laroche (X)	1,109	28.04
Nelson J. Lacasse (X)	1,061	26.83
John R. Welch	831	21.01
J. P. Nolan	559	14.13
Harry Scales	395	9.99

Ottawa Ward
Candidate	Votes	%
Aristide Belanger (X)	1,476	38.01
Wilfrid St. Aubin	1,263	32.53
Joseph Landriault	924	23.80
Aurelian Rose	220	5.67

Riverdale Ward
Candidate	Votes	%
George Sloan	1,567	35.17
George Pushman (X)	1,376	30.89
A. W. E. Hellyer	801	17.98
Robert Carson	711	15.96

Central Ward
Candidate	Votes	%
J. E. Stanley Lewis	1,499	29.69
William R. Low (X)	1,325	26.24
Harold C. Shipman	883	17.49
Kirby Bangs	851	16.85
W. F. Bowden Martin	491	9.72
