= William Dowler Morris =

Canadian politician

25th Mayor of Ottawa
- In office 1901–1901
- Preceded by: Thomas Payment
- Succeeded by: James Davidson

Personal details
- Born: August 22, 1857 County Leitrim, Ireland
- Died: April 13, 1931 (aged 73) Bermuda

William Dowler Morris (August 22, 1857 – April 13, 1931) was mayor of Ottawa, Ontario, Canada in 1901.

He was born in County Leitrim, Ireland in 1857 and came to Canada in 1877. He became involved in the oil, coal and real estate businesses; he also owned a brickyard. Morris was first elected to city council in 1892. He was forced to resign as mayor after being convicted of drinking after hours at the Russell House, an Ottawa hotel, an offence under the liquor license act. Under Ontario law at the time, the law provided that a violator of provincial law was disqualified from voting or holding public office for a period of two years, and Mayor Morris pled guilty on November 16, 1901.

During his term as mayor, he was instrumental in persuading philanthropist Andrew Carnegie to donate funds for the main branch of the Ottawa Public Library; the city made a commitment to allocate funds for the ongoing upkeep of the library. However, the mayor of the time, James A. Ellis, chose not to invite Morris to the 1906 opening. Morris also served as a transport officer in World War I at the age of 60.

Morris died in Bermuda in 1931.

Preceded by Thomas Payment	Mayor of Ottawa; 1901	Succeeded by James Davidson
