= C. T. Bate =

Canadian politician (1825–1889)

Charles Thornton Bate
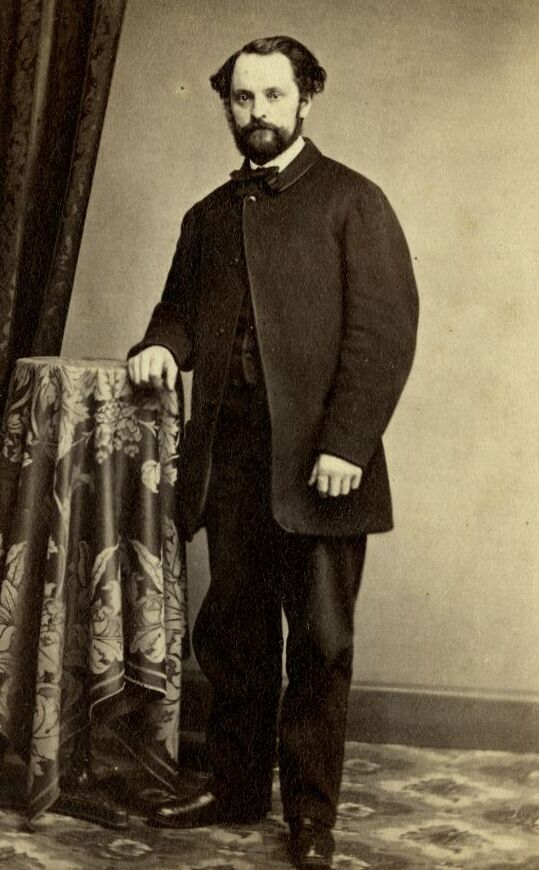

15th Mayor of Ottawa
- Incumbent
- Assumed office 1884
- Preceded by: Pierre St. Jean
- Succeeded by: Francis McDougal

Personal details
- Born: February 10, 1825 Cornwall, England
- Died: April 10, 1889 (aged 64) Ottawa

Charles Thornton Bate (February 10, 1825 – April 10, 1889) was mayor of Ottawa in 1884.

He was born in Cornwall, England in 1825, the son of Henry Newell Bate and Lisette Meyer. The family emigrated to St. Catharines, Ontario in 1833. In the 1850s he founded a large wholesale grocery business, "C. T. Bate & Co.", in Ottawa, Ontario with his brother, Henry Newell Bate, who became the first head of the Ottawa Improvement Commission, later the National Capital Commission and who was knighted in 1910.

Mr. Bate was mayor when Ottawa became the first city in Canada to be completely lit by electricity, after nearly two years of debate (the move having been rejected as unnecessary by Ottawa's previous mayor Charles Mackintosh). President of the Ottawa Electric Light Company and the Ottawa Gas Company, Bate served on the first board of the Bank of Ottawa, which later merged with Scotiabank.

In Ottawa, An Illustrated History, John H. Taylor wrote, "In the late nineteenth century, only the Ottawa merchandiser C.T. Bate, appears to have had any standing in the Canadian financial community".

Preceded by Pierre St. Jean	Mayor of Ottawa; 1884	Succeeded by Francis McDougal
