= McLeod Stewart =

Mayor of Ottawa, Ontario, Canada (1847–1926)

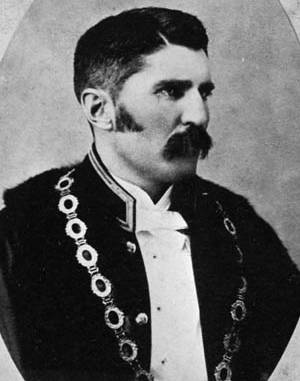
- McLeod Stewart Source: Library and Archives Canada

17th Mayor of Ottawa
- In office 1887–1888
- Preceded by: Francis McDougal
- Succeeded by: Jacob Erratt

Personal details
- Born: February 6, 1847 Ottawa, Canada West
- Died: October 9, 1926 (aged 79) Ottawa, Ontario, Canada

McLeod Stewart (1847–1926) was a Canadian lawyer and politician. Stewart was mayor of Ottawa, Ontario, Canada from 1887 to 1888.

== Biography ==
Stewart was born in Ottawa in 1847, the son of William Stewart, who represented Bytown (Ottawa) in the Legislative Assembly of the Province of Canada from 1844 to 1847.

The Stewart family owned some of the land south of Gladstone Avenue, which was then the southern limit for the city of Ottawa. The area was called Stewarton, and the family home was located on the current site of the Canadian Museum of Nature. McLeod Street in Ottawa is named after him.

Stewart studied at the University of Toronto, receiving an M.A. He served as a lieutenant in the Governor General's Foot Guards. In 1874, he married Linnie Emma, the daughter of Colonel Walker Powell. In 1881, with William Hodgson, he built the Molson's Bank building on the Sparks Street Mall. He served as president of the Canada Atlantic Railway and also served on the boards of several companies. Stewart also represented a number of companies as their solicitor in Ottawa. The first Central Canada Exhibition opened on September 25, 1888, during his term as mayor. In 1897, he visited London, seeking financial backers for The Montreal, Ottawa and Georgian Bay Canal Company, a company created by an Act of the Canadian Parliament in 1894 and empowered to construct a canal linking the Ottawa River and Georgian Bay. A second visit to Britain in 1899 was more successful, securing support for the project from a syndicate managed by James Aratoon Malcolm and chaired by Sir Edward Thornton.

In 1910, he authored The first half century of Ottawa.

| Preceded by Francis McDougal | Mayor of Ottawa; 1887-1888 | Succeeded by Jacob Erratt |
