= William Borthwick (Canadian politician) =

Canadian politician and mayor of Ottawa

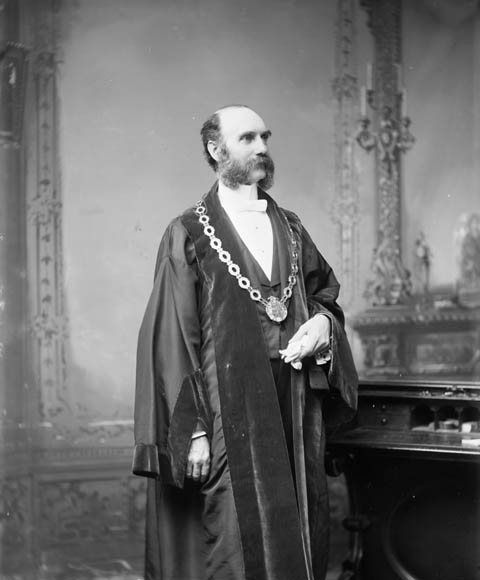
- William Borthwick in 1898

22nd Mayor of Ottawa
- In office 1895–1896
- Preceded by: George Cox
- Succeeded by: Samuel Bingham

Personal details
- Born: February 13, 1848
- Died: October 17, 1928 (aged 80) Ottawa

William H. Borthwick (February 13, 1848 – October 17, 1928) was mayor of Ottawa from 1895 to 1896.

He was born near Mer Bleue in Gloucester Township in 1848. He went to California in 1868 and worked in the timber trade there. He returned to Ottawa in 1872 and opened a grocery store. He was first elected as an alderman in 1887.

He was also a Freemason and member of Prince of Wales Lodge #371 in Ottawa, serving as its first Director of Ceremonies in 1879 and then Master of the Lodge in 1895 and 1896.

He died in 1928 of pneumonia and was buried in Beechwood Cemetery.

Political offices
Preceded by George Cox	Mayor of Ottawa; 1895–1896	Succeeded by Samuel Bingham
