= Samuel Bingham =

Canadian politician and former mayor of Ottawa, Canada

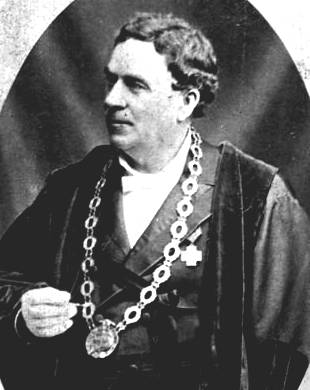
- Samuel Bingham

23rd Mayor of Ottawa
- Preceded by: William Borthwick
- Succeeded by: Thomas Payment

Personal details
- Born: 1845 Bytown's Lower Town
- Died: 16 June 1905 (aged 59–60) Wakefield, Quebec

Samuel Bingham (1845 – 16 June 1905) was the Mayor of Ottawa, Ontario, Canada between 1897 and 1898.

He was born in Bytown's Lower Town to Irish Catholic parents in 1845. As a young man, he worked on the log drives on the Gatineau River. With the Gilmour and Edwards lumber companies, he formed the Gatineau Boom Company, which later became part of the Canadian International Paper Company. He was an alderman on the Ottawa City Council from 1880 to 1893. Bingham believed that English speaking citizens of Ottawa should learn French.

In 1905, he drowned in the Gatineau River near Wakefield, Quebec after he fell asleep while returning in a horse-drawn wagon from clearing a log jam on the river.

There is a bust of Bingham by sculptor Hamilton MacCarthy in Notre-Dame Cemetery. In 1893, an attempt to rename the Cummings Bridge over the Rideau River after the former mayor was thwarted by residents of Sandy Hill.

| Preceded by William Borthwick | Mayor of Ottawa; 1897–1898 | Succeeded by Thomas Payment |
