= Olivier Durocher (Ontario politician) =

Canadian politician

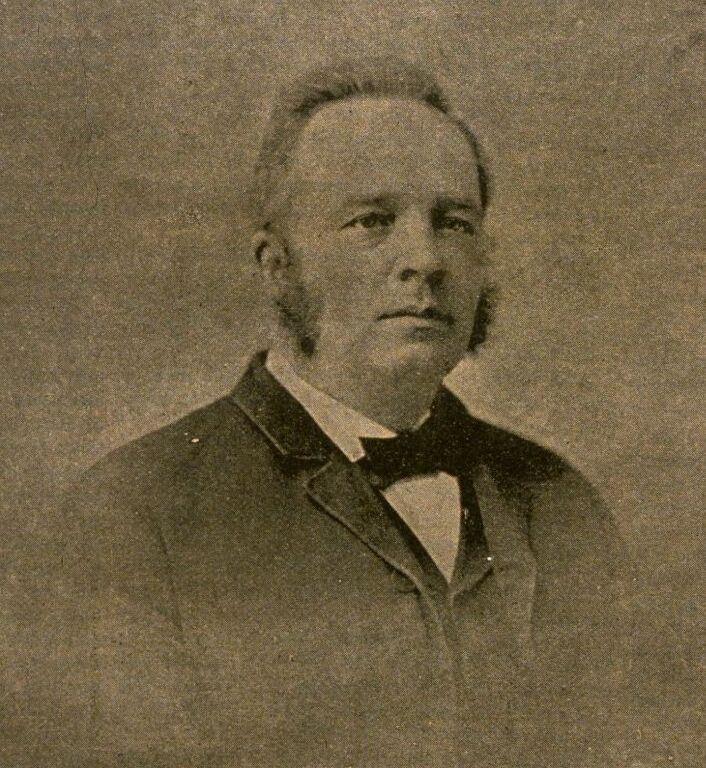

20th Mayor of Ottawa
- In office 1892–1893
- Preceded by: Thomas Birkett
- Succeeded by: George Cox

Personal details
- Born: c. 1844 Saint-Antoine, Quebec
- Died: September 3, 1931 Ottawa, Ontario, Canada

Olivier Durocher (c. 1844 – September 3, 1931) was mayor of the city of Ottawa, Ontario, Canada from 1892 to 1893.

He was born in Saint-Antoine, Canada East in about 1844 and moved to Ottawa around 1861. He apprenticed as a shoemaker, later opening his own business. He served on city council for 8 years.

Preceded by Thomas Birkett	Mayor of Ottawa; 1892-1893	Succeeded by George Cox
