= Taylor McVeity =

Canadian politician (1857–1951)

34th Mayor of Ottawa
- In office 1914–1914
- Preceded by: James A. Ellis
- Succeeded by: Nelson D. Porter

Personal details
- Born: February 20, 1857 Richmond, Canada West
- Died: March 21, 1951 (aged 94) Windsor, Ontario

Taylor McVeity (February 20, 1857, Richmond, Ontario – March 21, 1951) was elected mayor of Ottawa in 1914.

McVeity studied law, was called to the bar in 1882 and opened an office in Ottawa. After his term as mayor, he later moved to Windsor, Ontario.

Preceded by James A. Ellis	Mayor of Ottawa; 1914	Succeeded by Nelson D. Porter
