= Fred Cook (politician) =

Canadian politician

27th Mayor of Ottawa
- In office 1902–1903
- Preceded by: James Davidson
- Succeeded by: James A. Ellis

Personal details
- Born: 1858 Leeds, England
- Died: July 16, 1943 (aged 84–85) Ottawa, Ontario, Canada

Fred Cook (1858 – July 16, 1943) was mayor of Ottawa, Ontario, Canada, from 1902 to 1903.

He was born in Leeds, England, in 1858 and worked at the Montreal Star and the Toronto Mail (eventually merged with The Globe and Mail) before moving to Ottawa. Cook was also the Canadian correspondent for The Times, but was eventually dismissed because he was felt to be too partisan. He first served on city council in 1894.

He is buried in Beechwood Cemetery.

Preceded by James Davidson	Mayor of Ottawa; 1902–1903	Succeeded by James A. Ellis
