= G. B. Lyon-Fellowes =

Canadian politician

George Byron Lyon-Fellowes

10th Mayor of Ottawa
- In office Jan. 1876 – March 15, 1876
- Preceded by: J. P. Featherston
- Succeeded by: W. H. Waller

Legislative Assembly of the Province of Canada
- In office 1848–1861

Personal details
- Born: 1815 Sorel, Quebec
- Died: March 15, 1876 (aged 60–61) Ottawa
- Spouse: Fellowes

George Byron Lyon-Fellowes (1815–1876) was a mayor of Ottawa in 1876. He also represented Russell County in the Legislative Assembly of the Province of Canada from 1848 to 1861.

He was born George Byron Lyon at Sorel, Quebec in 1815, the son of George Lyon, a captain in the British army. He later adopted his wife's surname Fellowes. He studied law. His younger brother, Robert Lyon was also mayor of Ottawa.

He died while in office on March 15, 1876.

Political offices
| Preceded by J. P. Featherston | Mayor of Ottawa; 1876 | Succeeded by W. H. Waller |
