= J. P. Featherston =

Canadian politician

John Peter Featherston

10th Mayor of Ottawa
- In office 1874–1875
- Preceded by: Eugène Martineau
- Succeeded by: G. B. Lyon-Fellowes

Personal details
- Born: November 28, 1830 Durham, County Durham
- Died: June 17, 1917 (aged 86) Ottawa
- Party: Liberal
- Spouse: Bessie Featherstone

John Peter Featherston (November 28, 1830 – 1917) was the mayor of Ottawa, Ontario, Canada, from 1874 to 1875.

Born in Durham, England, in 1830, he moved to Canada in 1858. Upon settling in Ottawa, he opened a drug store. In 1867 he was elected to city council, and in 1879 was appointed clerk and registrar for the Carleton County court. He served as chairman of the board for the Ottawa Collegiate Institute, and ran unsuccessfully to represent the City of Ottawa in the federal parliament in an 1877 by-election. Featherston was a District Deputy Grand Master of the Freemasons.

Very little is known about Featherston, other than that he was a Liberal politician, and that he wired Richard Scott (later Sir Richard William Scott, K.C., P.C.) in 1871 advising him to enter the Liberal government. Later that year Scott became speaker of the legislature.

== Family ==
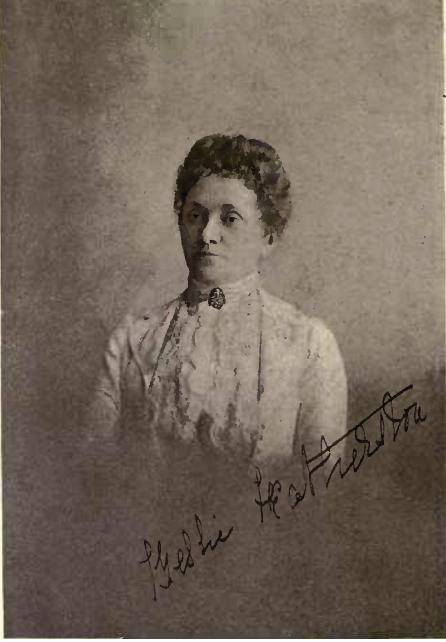
Mrs Bessie Featherstone by William James Topley

In 1871 John Peter Featherston married Bessie Parnell, daughter of John Parnell, of County Wicklow, Ireland. She was born in Dublin, and accompanied her parents to Canada. She volunteered with the Carleton Protestant Hospital, the Maternity Hospital, the Lady Stanley Institute, and the Ottawa Humane Society. She served as president of the Ladies' Auxiliary for the Carleton Protestant Hospital. Her residence as Lady Mayoress was 452 Rideau Street, Ottawa.

== Electoral history ==
1875 Ontario general election: Ottawa
Party	Candidate	Votes	%	±%
Liberal	Daniel John O'Donoghue	852	35.35	−34.37
Liberal	J. P. Featherston	800	33.20	−36.53
Conservative	John O'Connor	758	31.45	
Total valid votes		2,410	54.25	
Eligible voters		4,442		
Liberal hold		Swing		−34.37
Source: Elections Ontario

Preceded by Eugène Martineau	Mayor of Ottawa; 1874-1875	Succeeded by G. B. Lyon-Fellowes
