= Thomas Payment =

Canadian politician (1853–1920)

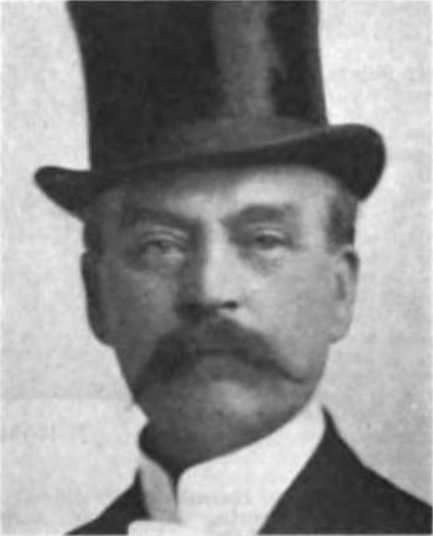

24th Mayor of Ottawa
- In office 1899–1900
- Preceded by: Samuel Bingham
- Succeeded by: William Dowler Morris

Personal details
- Born: July 6, 1853 Monotick, Canada West
- Died: January 13, 1920 (aged 66) Ottawa

Thomas Payment (1853 – 1920) was mayor of Ottawa, Ontario, Canada, from 1899 to 1900.

He was born in Manotick, Canada West, on July 6, 1853. He worked as a bookkeeper with a railroad company in Maine. Later, he studied at the Ontario College of Pharmacy and opened a drug store in the Byward Market area of Ottawa. During his term as mayor, a massive fire, the Hull-Ottawa fire of 1900, started in Hull and burned across the river at the Lebreton Flats, reaching as far as Dow's Lake.

He died in Ottawa on 13 January 1920 and was buried in the Notre-Dame Cemetery.

Preceded by Samuel Bingham	Mayor of Ottawa; 1899-1900	Succeeded by William Dowler Morris
