= Jacob Erratt =

Canadian mayor

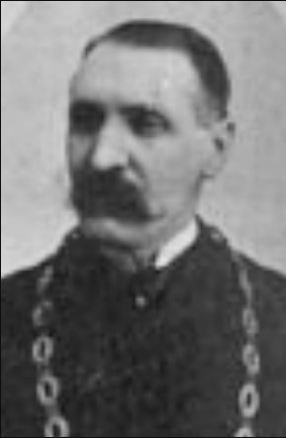
- Mayor Jacob Erratt

18th Mayor of Ottawa
- In office 1888 (acting) 1889 – 1890
- Preceded by: McLeod Stewart
- Succeeded by: Thomas Birkett

Personal details
- Born: November 16, 1847 Winchester, Ontario
- Died: April 28, 1928 Moose Jaw, Saskatchewan

Jacob Erratt (November 16, 1847 - April 28, 1928) was mayor of the city of Ottawa, Ontario, Canada from 1889 to 1890.

He was born in West Winchester, Ontario and came to Ottawa in 1869. He owned a furniture store in the city. He served on city council from 1882 to 1884. In 1888, he was named acting mayor. During his term as mayor, he served on the board of the Central Canada Exhibition Association. He also was a member of the Provisional Committee of the Lady Stanley institute for Trained Nurses at its incorporation in Ottawa in 1890. In 1902, he moved to Moose Jaw, Saskatchewan, where he opened a real estate office; he died there in 1928.

Preceded by McLeod Stewart	Mayor of Ottawa; 1889-1890	Succeeded by Thomas Birkett
