= W. H. Waller =

Canadian politician (1835–1885)

William Henry Waller

11th Mayor of Ottawa
- In office April 6, 1876 – 1877
- Preceded by: G. B. Lyon-Fellowes
- Succeeded by: C.W. Bangs

Personal details
- Born: May 14, 1835 Castle Waller in Newport, County Tipperary, Ireland
- Died: December 24, 1885 (aged 50) Ottawa

William Henry Waller (May 14, 1835 – December 24, 1885) was mayor of Ottawa in 1877.

He was born at Castle Waller in Newport, County Tipperary, Ireland in 1835 and came to Canada with his family in 1853. He settled in Toronto and was employed at The Globe. In 1861, he came to Ottawa as a member of the editorial staff of the Ottawa Union. He later became an insurance broker in partnership with Roderick O'Connor.

Waller was an alderman on city council from 1874 to 1875 and became mayor in a by-election, following the death of G. B. Lyon-Fellowes. He served as president of the Capital Mutual Building Society of Ottawa from 1876 to 1874. He was named registrar for Carleton County in 1879.

Political offices
Preceded by G. B. Lyon-Fellowes	Mayor of Ottawa; 1876–1877	Succeeded by C.W. Bangs
