= Robert A. Hastey =

Canadian politician

29th Mayor of Ottawa
- In office 1906–1906
- Preceded by: James A. Ellis
- Succeeded by: D'Arcy Scott

Personal details
- Born: 1847 Bytown
- Died: September 8, 1930 (aged 82–83) Ottawa

Robert A. Hastey (1847 – September 8, 1930) was mayor of Ottawa in 1906. He was born in Bytown in 1847. He worked in the stagecoach business for a number of years. Hastey served on city council as an alderman for twelve years and served as mayor for about a month after mayor James A. Ellis resigned to take a job with the city.

He died in Ottawa in 1930 and was buried in the Beechwood Cemetery.

Hastey Street in the Sandy Hill area of the city was named after him.

Preceded by James A. Ellis	Mayor of Ottawa; 1906	Succeeded by D'Arcy Scott
