= James Davidson (Canadian politician) =

Canadian politician

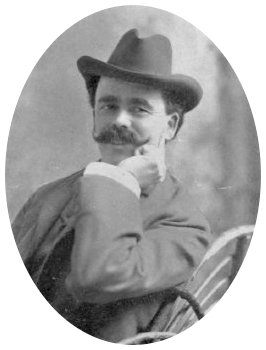

26th Mayor of Ottawa
- In office 1901–1901
- Preceded by: William Dowler Morris
- Succeeded by: Fred Cook

Personal details
- Born: November 1, 1856 Ottawa, Canada West
- Died: October 6, 1913 (aged 56) Ottawa, Ontario, Canada
- Occupation: timber trade and manufactured doors; alderman

James Davidson (November 1, 1856 – October 6, 1913) was mayor of Ottawa, Ontario, Canada in 1901.

He was born in Ottawa in 1856. With his brothers, he worked in the timber trade and manufactured doors. He served as alderman from 1898 to 1907; he became mayor when W.D. Morris was forced to resign. Davidson was replaced by Fred Cook two months later.

He died in Ottawa of a heart attack in 1913 and was buried in the Beechwood Cemetery.
