= Francis McDougal =

Canadian politician (1826–1910)

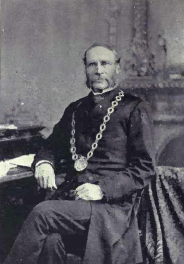

16th Mayor of Ottawa
- In office 1885–1886
- Preceded by: C. T. Bate
- Succeeded by: McLeod Stewart

Personal details
- Born: April 1826 Lancaster, Upper Canada
- Died: March 6, 1910 (aged 83) Ottawa, Ontario

Francis McDougal (April 1826 – March 6, 1910) was a Canadian businessman and mayor of Ottawa from 1885 to 1886.

He was born in Lancaster, Upper Canada in 1826 and came to Bytown in the 1840s. He worked as clerk in a hardware store and opened his own hardware business in 1851 on Sussex Street. He was an alderman from 1869 to 1876 and then from 1881 to 1883. During his term as mayor, electric street lights were introduced in Ottawa. During the 1890s, he was a director for J.R. Booth's Ottawa, Arnprior & Parry Sound Railway.

In 1858, McDougal married Amelia McGillis; the couple had three sons. One son Donald Joseph later served in the Ontario assembly.

He died of pneumonia in Ottawa in 1910, aged 83.
