= James A. Ellis =

Canadian politician

James Albert Ellis (June 1, 1864 – December 27, 1934) was mayor of Ottawa, Ontario, Canada, from 1904 to 1906 and in 1913. He represented Ottawa West in the Legislative Assembly of Ontario from 1911 to 1914.

He was born in Accrington, Lancashire, England, in 1864, the son of James Ellis. In 1884, he married Catherine Fishwick. Ellis came to Ontario in 1885. Hydro Ottawa was established during Ellis's period in office. Ellis resigned before the end of his term in 1906 to become city assessment commissioner. He served as city treasurer from 1907 to 1911. Ellis also served as a public school trustee.

He died in Ottawa in 1934 and is buried in Beechwood Cemetery.

Preceded by Fred Cook	Mayor of Ottawa; 1904–1906	Succeeded by Robert A. Hastey
Preceded by Edward H. Hinchey	Mayor of Ottawa; 1913	Succeeded by Taylor McVeity
