= D'Arcy Scott =

Canadian lawyer and politician

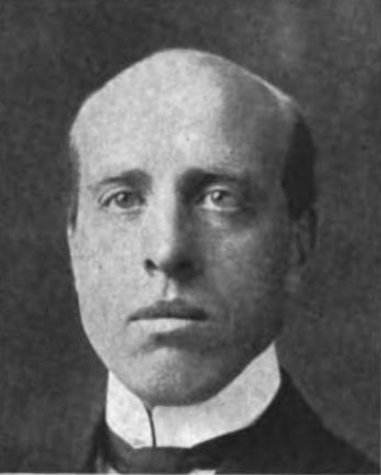

30th Mayor of Ottawa
- In office 1907–1908
- Preceded by: Robert A. Hastey
- Succeeded by: Napoléon Champagne

Personal details
- Born: 8 March 1872
- Died: 1 October 1926 (aged 54)
- Occupation: Lawyer

D'Arcy Scott (8 March 1872 – 1 October 1926), the son of Sir Richard William Scott, was mayor of Ottawa from 1907 to 1908.

Scott was a prominent Ottawa lawyer. Like his father before him, he handled the Canadian Pacific Railway's legal business in Ottawa. He played an important role in the construction of Union Station, now the Government Conference Centre in Ottawa. In 1908 he was appointed chief assistant commissioner of the Board of Railway Commissioners, the predecessor of the Canadian Transportation Agency.

In his youth Scott was an active member of the Ottawa Canoe Club and a competitive paddler; in 1893 and 1897 he won the American Canoe Association paddling championship and in 1894 and 1895 he placed second.
