= C. W. Bangs =

Canadian politician

Chauncey Ward Bangs

12th Mayor of Ottawa
- Incumbent
- Assumed office 1878
- Preceded by: William Henry Waller
- Succeeded by: Charles Herbert Mackintosh

Personal details
- Born: January 19, 1814 Standstead
- Died: March 21, 1892 (aged 78) Ottawa
- Spouse: Elizabeth Kirby

Chauncey Ward Bangs (January 19, 1814 – March 21, 1892) was mayor of Ottawa, Ontario, Canada in 1878.

He was born in Standstead in the Eastern Townships of Lower Canada in 1814, the son of Benjamin Bangs. His family came to Canada from the United States during the War of 1812 and later moved to L'Orignal. He entered the hat and fur business, the same as his father, and came to Bytown in 1847. In 1849, Bangs married Elizabeth Kirby from Hawkesbury. In 1867, he helped establish the Buckingham Manufacturing Company which operated a sawmill on the du Lièvre River. He was an alderman for nine years on city council, later becoming mayor. He ran unsuccessfully for a seat in the federal parliament in 1878.

Bangs was part owner of the Dominion Springs Company, which operated the first hotel at Carlsbad Springs during the 1870s. Guests came to take advantage of the mineral springs found there.
