= George Cox (Ottawa politician) =

Canadian politician and mayor of Ottawa (1834–1909)

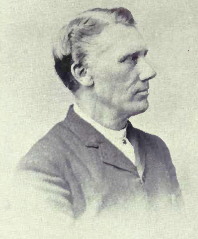

21st Mayor of Ottawa
- In office 1894–1894
- Preceded by: Olivier Durocher
- Succeeded by: William Borthwick

Personal details
- Born: November 17, 1834 Montreal, Quebec, Canada
- Died: December 17, 1909 (aged 75)

George Cox (November 17, 1834 – December 17, 1909) was mayor of the city of Ottawa, Ontario, Canada in 1894.

He was born on Saint Helen's Island in Montreal in 1834 and came to Ottawa in 1855. He served as alderman on city council from 1882 to 1888 and in 1891. He was unsuccessful in an attempt to become mayor in 1892, when Olivier Durocher was selected. He did not complete his term as mayor, resigning for health reasons.

He died in 1909 and is buried in Beechwood Cemetery.
