= Eugène Martineau (politician) =

Canadian politician

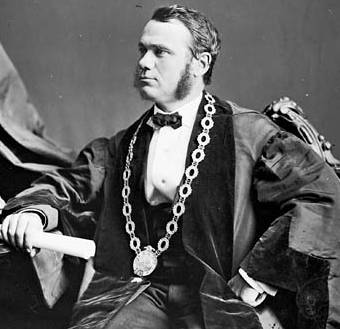
- Eugène Martineau Source: Topley Studio / Library and Archives Canada

8th Mayor of Ottawa
- In office 1872–1873
- Preceded by: John Rochester (politician)
- Succeeded by: John Peter Featherston

Personal details
- Born: 1837 Sainte-Nicholas, Lower Canada
- Died: 1880 (aged 42–43) Ottawa

Eugène Martineau (1837–1880) was mayor of Ottawa from 1872 to 1873, the first francophone mayor for Ottawa after the town's name was changed from Bytown.

He was born in Saint-Nicholas, Lower Canada in 1837. Martineau came to Ottawa some time before 1860. A stone building on Murray Street in the Byward Market area now known as Heritage House, previously known as the Martineau Hotel, was built by Martineau in 1872. He served at least 16 years as alderman on the City Council. Martineau promoted the building of an aqueduct across the Lebreton Flats to provide water to the city. Late in life, he encountered financial problems in his business interests and died in 1880.
