= William Pittman Lett =

Journalist, bureaucrat and poet

- Algonquin Honorary Chief Wah Bae Mimi (White Dove)
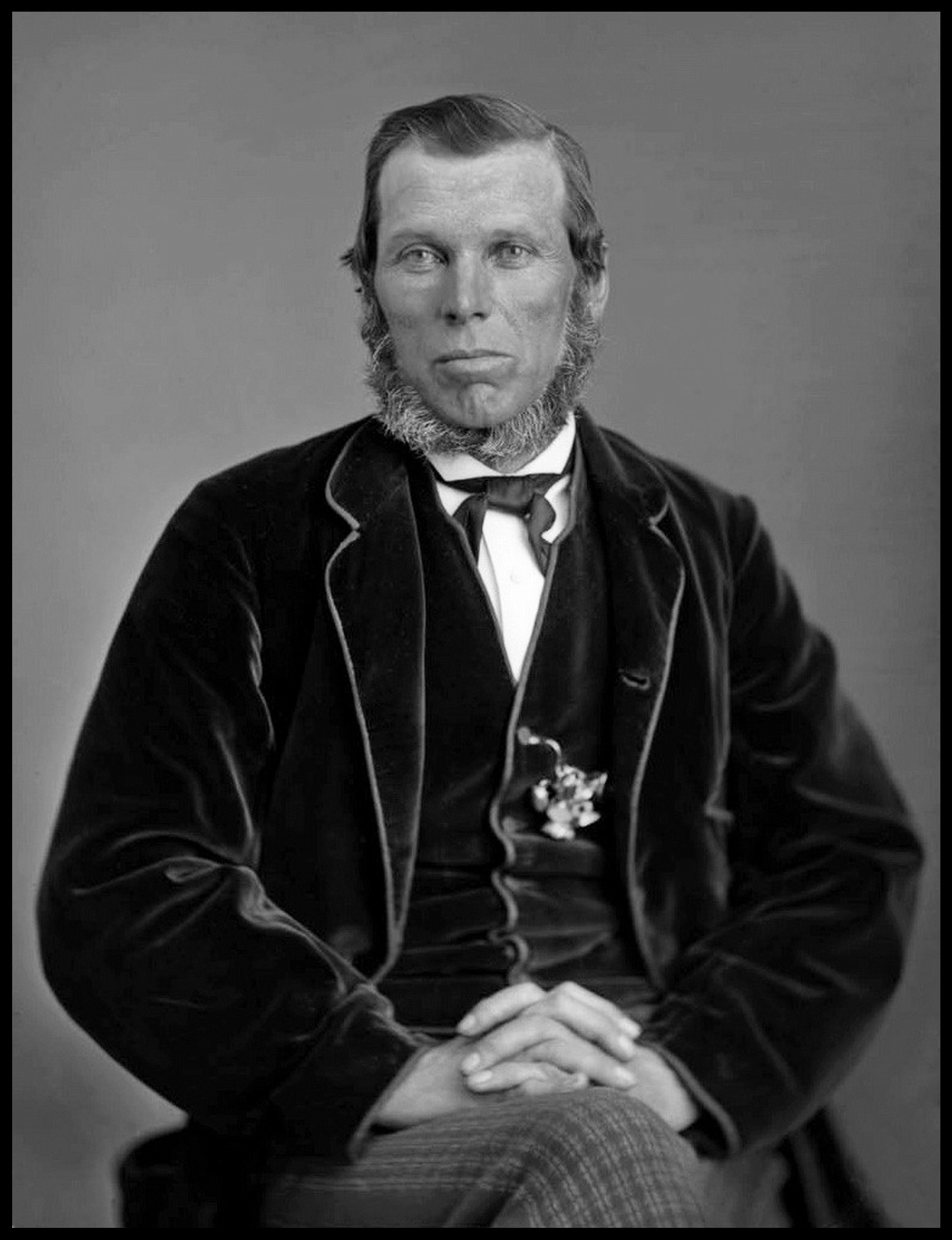
- Age 51, April 1870, Ottawa (Topley Studio / Library And Archives Canada)
- Born: 1819; Duncannon, Ireland
- Died: 1892 (aged 72–73); Ottawa, Ontario, Canada
- Burial place: Beechwood Cemetery, Ottawa, section 34, lot 28 NW
- Occupations: Journalist, bureaucrat
- Employer(s): First city clerk and a founding father of the City of Ottawa, 1855–1891
- Known for: 19th-century commentator and poet, theatre pioneer, naturalist and sportsman
- Political party: Tory
- Movement: Orangeman, Master Mason, Freemason, Militia captain (Fourth Battalion, Richmond Volunteer Military Company)
- Spouse: Maria Hinton (1828–1881 accidental death)
- Children: Andrews John (1854), Joseph Benjamin Havelock (1857), William Pittman (1859–1933), Frederick Piercy Austin (1863–1898), Norman Harold Hinton (1865–1940), Robert Chamberlain Westover (1870–1957), Rebecca (1852–1883), Anna Eliza (1861–1946), Maria Dulcibella (1867–1930)
- Parents: Captain Andrews Lett (28th Cameronian Regiment of Foot) (1783–1824) (father); Rebecca Lett (mother)
- Awards: Bronze Medal for Bravery, Royal Humane Society, 18 July 1881

Signature
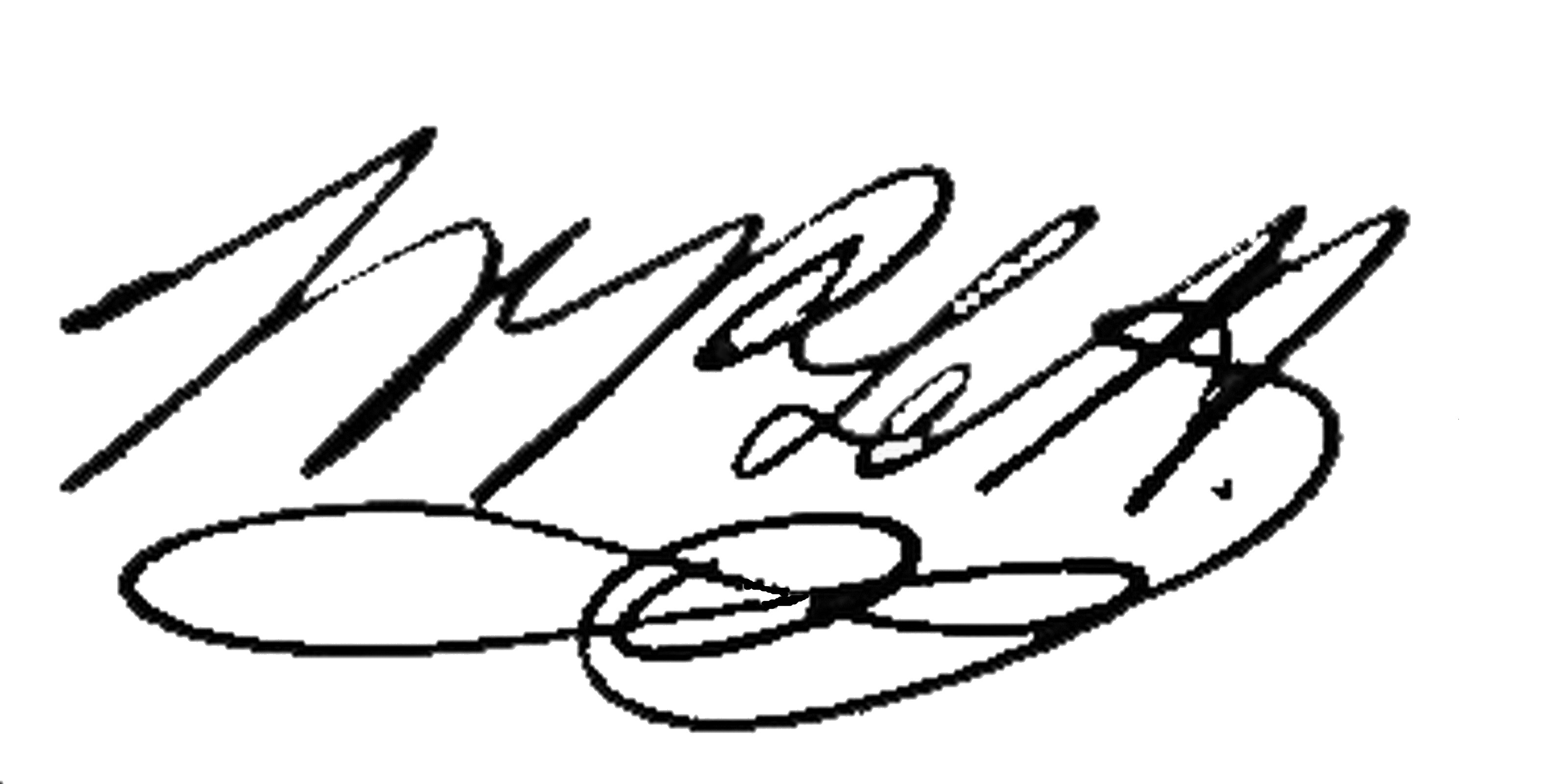

William Pittman Lett (12 August 1819 – 15 August 1892) was an Irish Canadian journalist, bureaucrat and poet. He arrived in Upper Canada as a 10-month-old baby in the family of Captain Andrews Lett, a veteran of the 28th Cameronian Regiment of Foot and a pioneer of the settlement of Richmond. A journalist for the Orange Order, a Tory and loyal to the British Crown, William Pittman was a founding father and chronicler of Bytown, subsequently the City of Ottawa, and its first and longest-serving civic clerk (1855–1891). He promoted theatre in Ottawa and its learned societies and was a prolific commentator and poet of public affairs throughout the second half of the 19th century.

== Early life ==
William Pittman Lett was the great-great-grandson of Thomas Lett (1600–1665), a puritan English captain in the New Model Army, who had moved from Worcestershire to Ireland when Oliver Cromwell invaded in 1649 to conquer an alliance of the Irish Catholic Confederation and English Royalists. William's father, Andrews Lett, continued the family's military and Protestant traditions in the British Imperial Army's 26th Cameronian Regiment of Foot, first mustered in 1689 from the Covenanters to fight for William of Orange to prevent any dilution of the Presbyterian faith. Andrews served under Sir John Moore in the Napoleonic Wars, particularly the Spanish Peninsular War. He married Rebecca Lett, a distant cousin from Ballyvergin, County Wexford and William Pittman was born in nearby Duncannon on 12 August 1819.

Andrews Lett had taken advantage of a land grant afforded pensioned soldiers by the British army which was establishing a reserve force in three Upper Canada townships, Lanark (1815), Perth (1816) and Richmond (1818), to deter and defend against American invasion of the colony at the end of the Anglo-American War of 1812–1815. William was 10 months old when the family stepped ashore at Richmond landing below the Chaudière Falls of the Ottawa River in June 1820 and trekked to the Richmond military settlement to clear land for a farm near Huntley. Andrews died in the Spring of 1824 and the farm was taken over by his son Andrews Lett with whom William stayed until moving with his devoutly Methodist mother to Bytown in 1828. She had remarried to Dr. James Stewart, Bytown's coroner from 1845 to 1858.

William was well educated at public and grammar schools in Hull and Bytown and the monitorial High School in Montreal, where his principal was the Reverend John Bethune (1791–1872), masonic master, Anglican Dean of Montreal and founding Principal of McGill University. He was subsequently tutored in the classics by an ex-university teacher, the Reverend Dr. Alexander Fletcher of South Plantagenet.

With his military ancestry and his Protestant loyalty to the Crown and Canada, William joined a regiment of volunteers mustered in 1837 in response to the Upper and Lower Canada Rebellions. William rose through the ranks of the militia to become captain of the Fourth Battalion of the Richmond Volunteer Military Company in July 1858. He did not see active service during the Rebellions or against the Fenian raiders (1866–1871).

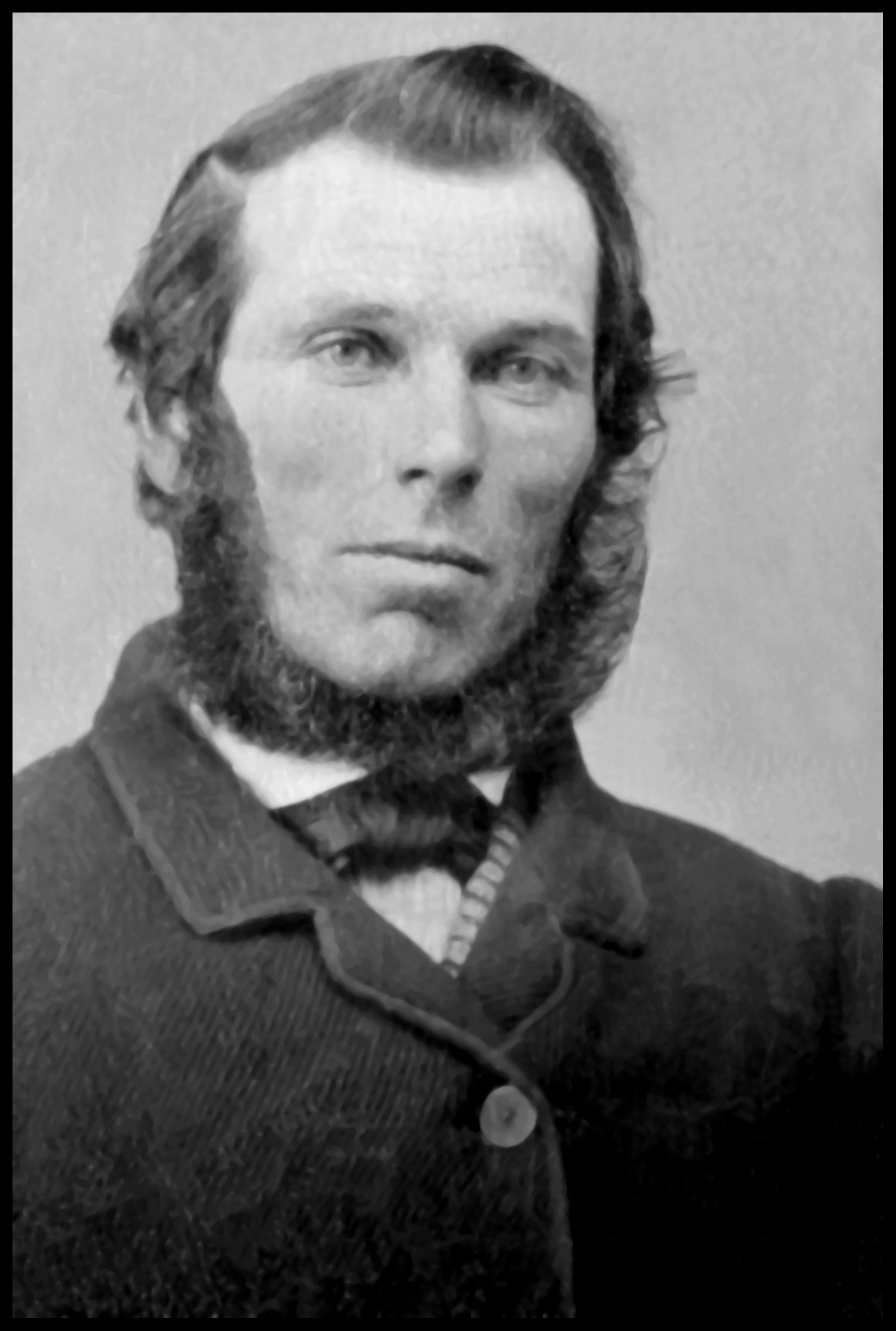
William Pittman Lett, Young Radical ca.1850, Bytown (City of Ottawa Archives)

== Orangeman journalist ==
In 1841, Dawson Kerr hired classically-educated Lett as editor- in-chief of an early Bytown Newspaper, The Advocate. In July 1849 he used this platform to found and print The Orange Lily and Protestant Vindicator, a semi-monthly literary newspaper devoted to the Protestant cause of the Orangemen, in which Lett wrote anti-Catholic editorials and posted some of his earliest poetry.

The Orange Lily circulated for several years during the sectarian strife in Canada of the late 1840s and early '50s. In his poem 17 September, published in the Orange Lily, documenting the 1849 'Stoney Monday' riot in the ByWard Market of Bytown, Lett sides with the Tories and Protestants against the Reformists and Catholics.

Although he moderated his views later in life, Lett remained an active and lifelong member of the Orange Order becoming Secretary for the Bytown District of the Royal Scarlett Lodge of Orangemen Number 119 in 1850.

By 1862, Lett had also risen to third degree standing in the Grand Doric (Ottawa) Lodge of the Masons of Canada and graduated as Master Mason in 1888.

His memberships in the Orange Order and the Freemasons were not only expressions of his Protestantism, temperance and loyalty to the British Crown, but also provided the contacts and networks important to furthering his career.

== Theatre pioneer ==
The first recorded theatrical performances in Bytown were by the Garrison Club of the 15th Regiment staged in the barracks on what is now Parliament Hill. However, this was followed by 13 years of thespian silence until, in 1850, Lett organised and presided over Bytown's first drama club in the town hall.

In 1854, he promoted his anti-slavery agenda with a staging of Uncle Tom's Cabin by a professional troupe from New York. The 12 performance reception prompted the building in the same year of Her Majesty's Theatre on Ottawa's Wellington Street with a seating capacity of one thousand people; one seventh of the city's population. Ottawa's boom in theatre construction and play production followed for the remainder of the century.

== Marriage, home and church ==
Thirty-year-old Lett married twenty-one-year-old Maria Hinton on 22 October 1849. She was born on 29 October 1828, the second daughter of Joseph Hinton (1798–1884) and Anna Mills (c1797-1876).

Joseph Hinton had arrived in the Richmond settlement in December 1818 with the first contingent of retiring soldiers from the 100th Prince Regent's County of Dublin Royal Regiment of Foot, to make his fortune as the storeowner. He had risen in social standing to become a justice of the peace, a coroner, and councillor, reeve and Warden in Carleton County. His father, William Hinton, had escaped being burned alive in a barn in Ireland during the Scullabogue Massacre of 1798, thanks to a warning by a faithful Catholic maid who lost her own life in the fire. Joseph deplored the fanatical strife in Ireland stoked in part by the Orange Order. He supported the alternative Protestant Benevolent Society of Ireland which was not anti-Catholic; thus he had little time for Lett, the Orangeman journalist.

Maria and William had to elope to be married in the Methodist chapel in Huntley. Maria was ostracised until her sister convinced Joseph Hinton to visit the Letts and their first baby at their rental home in Ottawa under a false pretense of accompanying her to the dressmakers. A forgiving Joseph built them a large house, 'Richmond Place', at 12 Dalhousie Street in a wealthy enclave of Ottawa's Lowertown overlooking the Ottawa River on the same bluff as the 'Earnscliffe' home of Lett's future friend and political ally, Prime Minister John A. Macdonald. Richmond Place became home to William and Maria's nine children.

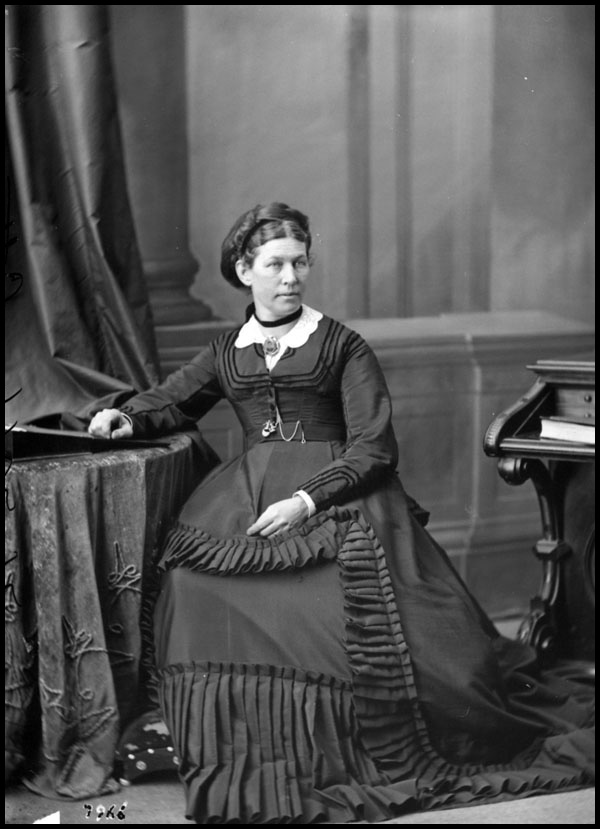
Maria Hinton Lett, 1871 (Topley Studio / City of Ottawa Archives)

William relied heavily on Maria to anchor the home and family while he pursued his career and many interests. His poetry reflects their abiding love. She was also a philanthropic woman, known to the poor, to society and to friends as wise, unselfish, dignified, kind, concerned for the happiness and welfare of others, energetic and of "stability of character". She promoted the rebuilding of the Carleton General Protestant Hospital in 1875 at the corner of Ottawa's Charlotte and Rideau Streets.

Although a Presbyterian, Maria supported William's lifelong Methodist conviction and service. As President of the Ladies Aid Society she led fund raising to rebuild the Dominion Methodist Church in 1875-76, located on Ottawa's Metcalfe Street at Queen Street and destroyed by fire in February 1961.

== City clerk ==
In January 1855, Tory Mayor, John Bower Lewis (1817–1874), appointed Lett as Clerk to the newly incorporated City of Ottawa. Lett learned quickly the arts of neutrality, circumspection and diplomatic persuasion necessary to be a successful Clerk for the next thirty-six years.

As Clerk, he had to ensure administrative unity between the various city departments and maintain custody of all records, by-laws, deeds and leases of property, contracts and agreements and minutes of council and committee meetings. He co-signed with the Mayor on all deeds, agreements and contracts. He posted notices of Council meetings in the newspapers. He was guardian of the corporate seal and applied the oath of corporate office. As electoral officer, he managed voter registrations and elections. He prepared the tax ledgers and adjudicated tax claims. He was registrar of births, marriages and deaths. He managed the initial selector of jurors to be referred to the Crown Attorney.

City Clerks in 19th century colonial Canada controlled small, but powerful bureaucracies and were a well-networked community. In his poem Exchanging Compliments and in a letter to the Kingston Daily News, Lett paid tribute to "my friend, Michael Flanagan, City Clerk of Kingston, Ontario on completion of his thirty-eighth year of official life" ... "the patriarch of our band".

Lett held the power of the civic pen and had the ear of nineteen Mayors of Ottawa. According to his obituary in the Ottawa Evening Journal, he proved an indispensable civic speechwriter, "To speak of Mr. Lett's merits without mentioning his usefulness outside of his mere routine duties, and of his large-hearted liberality, where his sympathy was enlisted, would be regrettable. Many a Mayor, in the earlier days of the City, had reason to rejoice that one better educated and better qualified for literary work than the occupant of the Chair was at hand when the address, motion or memorial had to be penned. The City Clerk had read extensively and was possessed of a memory reliable to the last degree. Give him the subject to be spoken of and in half an hour the document would be produced that would stand the test of the refined and the educated. So well was this understood, that no anxiety was manifested as to the words to be used on any public occasion for the parchment was ready when required and met the occasion acceptably".

Lett co-signed with Mayor J. B Lewis, the address to Queen Victoria of 4 May 1857, prepared by R. W. Scott, petitioning for Ottawa to become the capital of the Province of Canada.

He likely wrote and he co-signed the address by Mayor Francis McDougal (1826 –1910) on the return to Ottawa on 24 July 1885 of Captain Todd and the Ottawa Sharpshooters from their campaign during the North-West Rebellion.

He drafted and co-signed all the documents of transmittal and subsequent resolutions to the Governor General and to both Houses of Parliament. These requested compensation for the tax-exempt status of Government facilities and activities in Ottawa and financial aid to expand City infrastructure to accommodate the newly located Legislature and the Offices of the Government and pay for the construction of permanent office buildings. On 10 August 1877, Lett moved a motion to constitute a Committee, which included the Mayor of Ottawa, Members of Parliament, Aldermen and businessmen, to draft a constitution and new bylaws for the government of the "new society" of the City of Ottawa.

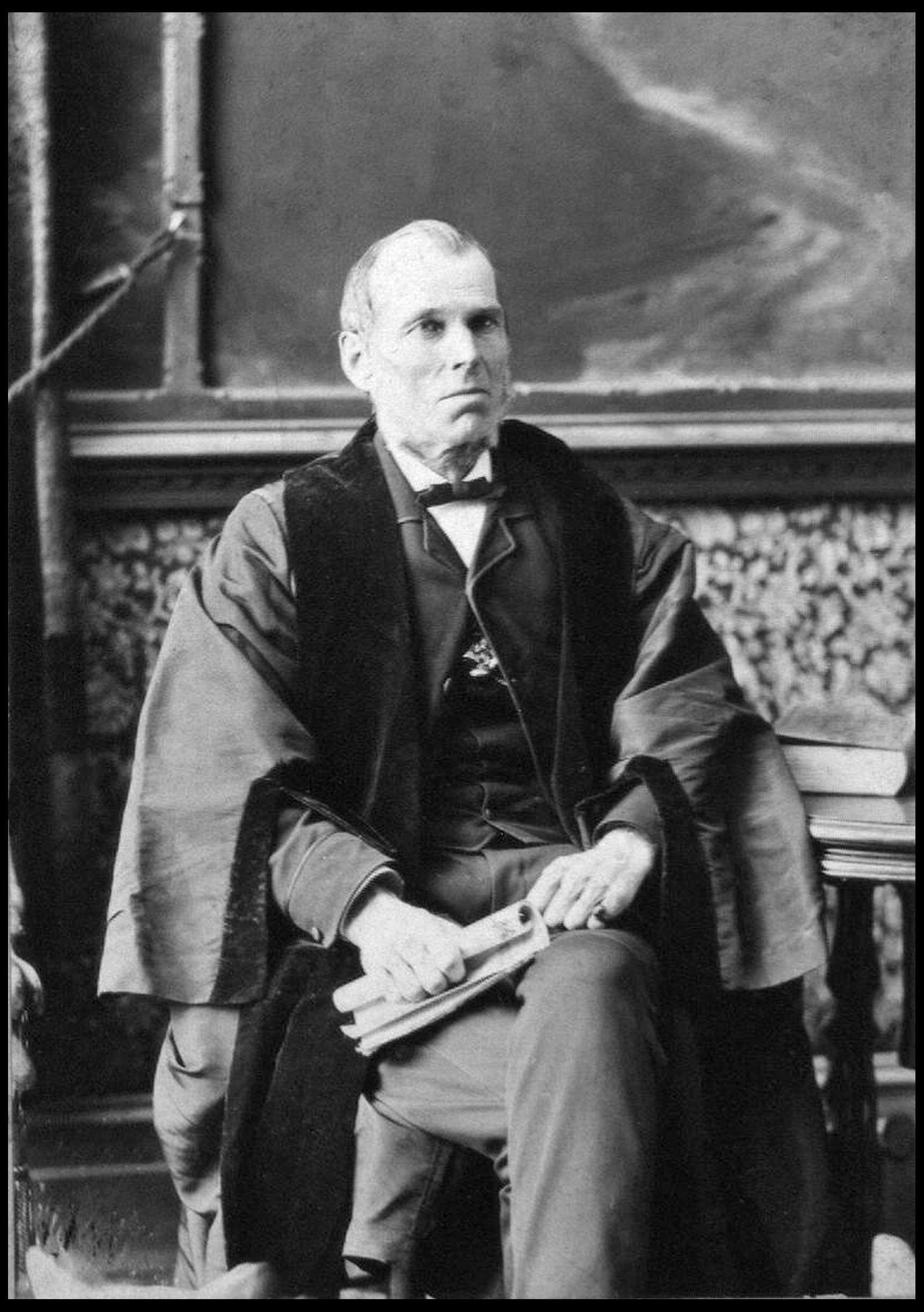
William Pittman Lett, First Clerk, City of Ottawa. 1855–1891 (Royal Studio / City of Ottawa Archives)

On 28 June 1867, he issued on behalf of the Celebration Committee of Council, the public announcement of the Inauguration of the Dominion of Canada to be held on Monday, 1 July 1867 and personally organised the commemorative lacrosse games and boat and canoe races. Fireworks and bonfires rounded out the evening in a tinder-box of a wood-framed City. Lett regulated these incendiaries with great caution and was Secretary of the Reliance Fire Engine Company.

He assumed the additional duty of acting Clerk to the Police Court of the new City until his son William Pittman junior took over in 1881. On occasion, he undertook the hazardous job of accompanying prisoners to the Carleton County jail in Perth along the bush road where accomplices often sought to free them.

Lett recognised the importance of having well-designed physical infrastructure to sustain a burgeoning Capital City. In 1871, he arranged for a fellow mason and subsequently his tenant, Arthur R. Sowdon to be hired away from his Deputy City Surveyor position in Montreal to the post of Ottawa City Engineer.

Lett eventually attained such stature as a civic leader as to have had his short biography published with those of the mayor and city council in 1887 for Queen Victoria's Golden Jubilee. The accompanying commemorative photographic card shows Lett in pride-of-place, flanked by the Prime Minister, Sir John A. Macdonald and Dominick Edward Blake, Leader of the Opposition Liberal Party, at the inverted apex of triangulation with the images of Queen Victoria and Prince Albert and as the foundation supporting Mayor Stewart McLeod and City Hall.

Lett's close friendship with Prime Minister John A. Macdonald is evident from frequent personal correspondence. City Council capitalised on this when instructing Lett to prepare resolutions and arrange for delegations to meet with the Prime Minister and Government Committees. A resolution was passed on 6 December 1882 that a Special Committee should meet with the 'Premier of Canada' to create a capital city district similar to the District of Columbia, under the immediate control of the Government of the Dominion. Although this fell on deaf ears, it may be taken as the earliest suggestion for a National Capital Region. Through resolutions to the Government and in his poetry, Lett also promoted schemes to link Bytown/Ottawa by railway to the rest of Canada and the United States.

== Public personality ==
=== Intellectual ===
Lett was active in the development of Bytown and Ottawa's intellectual societies.

The Bytown Mechanics' Institute was established in 1847 as a reading room for the professional class; Lett was a founder. It was replaced by the opening of the francophone Institute Canadien Français d'Ottawa in 1852 and the anglophone Bytown Mechanics' Institute and Athenaeum (BMIA) on 29 January 1853. The BMIA hosted many local lectures, allowed female, Catholic and working class memberships, held picnics for wives and their families and curated a large newspaper and periodical library and local natural history museum. In 1856, the BMIA changed its name to the Ottawa Mechanics' Institute and Athenaeum (OMIA) to reflect the City's incorporation. The Ottawa City Directories of 1867 and 1870 list Lett as a trustee and the corresponding secretary. In 1868/9, the Ottawa Natural History Society, of which Lett was also a member, and the OMIA were merged by Provincial Act into the Ottawa Literary and Scientific Society. Even the Institute Canadien Français d'Ottawa recognised Lett's intellectual contributions with an honorary membership on 31 May 1886, despite his anti-Catholic past and little engagement in French Canadian literature.

=== Naturalist ===
Lett had profound knowledge of local natural history and the Canadian wilderness derived from his lifelong passions for hunting and fishing. He published and lectured extensively and learnedly in zoology throughout the second half of the 19th century including detailed papers and observations on the wolf, American skunk, Canadian otter, black bear, caribou, deer, cougar, ducks and teals. He was a member (1882–1892) of the Ottawa Field Naturalists' Club and was the inaugural co-leader of its zoological branch in 1883, co-authoring annual reports and assisting as a leader until his death in 1892.

=== Orator ===
Lett was in great demand as a keynote speaker at church, societal and professional functions including the Mechanics' Institute, attended by the Prime Minister and Lady Macdonald, members of Cabinet and a large audience of Ottawa society. He was guest speaker at society weddings. He often used his sense of humor to convey an intellectual message, for example, spoofing the Ottawa Literary and Scientific Society in December 1876 with an extensive pseudo-scientific analysis of the rings of Saturn. He lampooned the Board of Trade and the etiquette of fancy balls. He reflected the national sentiment in his praise of Governor General and Countess Dufferin and called for national unity in his Address to the Annual Entertainment of the St. Patrick's Literary Association on Saint Patrick's Day 1878. He exchanged poetry with the Countess.

=== Principles and morality ===
Lett was an opinionated man of high principles and morality, unafraid to speak his mind forcefully and directly.

He frequently opposed slavery in his verse and prose. He was concerned that any revival of the movement to annexe Canada to the United States would reintroduce slavery into Canada, the destination to freedom for slaves using the Underground Railroad until abolition in 1865. In his Address to Brother Jonathan published in 1889, Lett publicly reprimanded the American President for not pursuing policies to "crush the aspirations of the South" and improve the conditions for former slaves after their "expedient emancipation".

In that same Address, he declared his moral positions on many issues in a vitriolic exhortation to the President. "Abolish the free love of your infamous Divorce Court…make your laws supreme…banish the bowie knife and the revolver (carried as concealed weapons)…purify your judicial bench…reconstruct your election laws…keep your greenbacks out of the ballot-box…endeavor to get an honest expression of political opinion…and try a dose of national probity... if moral blood-poisoning has not enervated your system beyond redemption".

His 1873 poem, "Concealed Weapons", argued for their banning in the wake of the assassinations of US presidents Lincoln and Garfield, and of Canadian politician and fellow poet, Thomas D'Arcy McGee in 1868, allegedly by the Feniann sympathiser and Catholic, Patrick J. Whelan. He penned political satire in the Ottawa Citizen newspaper under the pseudonym of Jeremiah O'Casey, writing from Washington, D.C.

He was proud that Canada embraced the Constitution secured by the British Revolution of 1688 as the ideal model for governance, with a constitutional monarchy subject to law but retaining some political power; a mixed constitution between absolute monarchy and republican democracy. However, Lett stopped short of total emancipation, fearing that British Chartism might give all classes the vote and that the ignorant may vote for a rebellious cause.

Made President of the Ottawa Temperance Society in 1873, Lett gave rallying speeches including a strident address on The Enemies of King Alcohol: The Fight between Cold Water and Whiskey. He wrote a temperance hymn.

Lett held mixed opinions towards the suffragette movement. He prefaced his poem Woman with the widely-held opinion that a woman's God-given mission is to procreate and train her children for life on Earth and in Heaven. However, he supported a view that injustice is done to woman by public opinion, compared with its treatment of man, under precisely similar adverse circumstances…society did not require to be any more severe, any more uncharitable as respects women in this particular, but justice did call for similar treatment, to men, under like circumstances. He defined woman as "the 'summon bonum' of existence, without whom this earth would be a desert and life blank. Women have humanising and refining influence upon society, an influence stronger than physical force, more potent than law. Women ought to be first, not merely as a courtesy, but because women are the mothers of us all".

Lett was charitable towards those who he felt deserving. In his 1847 poem, The Famine, he called for international aid to the starving of the Great Famine of Ireland (1845–1852). In his poetry he had little pity for The Deserter but, in 1880, urged forgiveness for a ninety-five-year Old Soldier of the Napoleonic Wars who was being punished for vagrancy.

=== Patriot ===
Lett was an avowed patriot of the British mother countries of England, Ireland and Scotland. His poetry is filled with accounts of British heroism, the glories and defence of the Empire and British cultural and engineering supremacy. Queen Victoria, her consort, her children and her vice-regal Canadian Governors' General are praised. He lambasts domestic and British politicians who challenged Throne or whose trade or foreign policies, such as those of William Ewart Gladstone, threatened Canada's economic or social security. He attacks political and provincial opponents of Confederation. The British Connexion had to be maintained at all costs. He campaigned in prose and verse to retain the Union Jack during the national flag debate that followed the signing of Confederation.

Lett could read of global news in the foreign dispatches of the newspapers. He was concerned about the defence of the British Empire especially in India and Africa, and the shifting balance of power in Europe. His poetry in the same newspapers reflects his fear of Russian and more particularly Prussic-German imperial ambitions for Europe and the world, believing prophetically that, in the long run, not even the Americas would be immune. He laments the fate of Poland and even that of France after the calamitous siege of Paris in 1871. He warns America not to fuel these conflicts through international trading in guns and munitions. He keeps a wary eye on the republican experiments in Europe and North and South America, fearing that Canada might deviate from a path towards a monarchical confederated constitution grounded in British law and emulating British parliamentary structure and process.

Lett's previously mentioned 1889 Address to Brother Jonathan, Annexation and the British Connection is an aggressive, twenty-page polemic on Canadian independence and patriotism. In the Address, he characterises Americans as having been "led astray by incorrect information…and with supreme self-possession, you smoke your cigar, you think of the 'Monroe doctrine', and ponder over the visionary dream that Canada will yet form a part of your country". He bluntly tells America to leave Canada to prosper under a system of government connected to the British monarchy and preferable to republicanism. He challenges America to stop its diplomatic and military belligerence toward Canada, and ends with a version of his patriotic poem of passionate loyalty to the British Connexion.

Until his death in 1892, Lett opposed any traitorous hint of annexation, even after the debate had shifted to trade reciprocity or stronger commercial union. Around 1891, an old and terminally ill Lett still had the conviction to pen a damning indictment of the Canadian politicians Sir Richard Cartwright and Solomon White, and journalist Erastus Wiman for their support of free trade by reciprocity and for rekindling the old Canada Annexation Debate of the mid-19th century: they are the badger, muskrat and skunk making treasonable misrepresentations to allure Canadians from their allegiance and supporting the bald headed eagle, the unfortunately selected emblem in the Yankee Escutcheon, [to be] the plundering harpy who wants to rob the Canadian Osprey of his dinner.

=== Chronicler ===
Lett chronicled the evolution of Bytown and Ottawa throughout his life.

He published his only collection of poetry, Recollections of Bytown and Its Old Inhabitants in 1874. The Recollections are a series of extended poems mostly in rhyming couplet form describing Bytown's notable residents, their locations, characters and occupations, portrayed on a detailed historical and geographic canvas. Much of Lett's other poetry details significant local events and personalities.

Lett gave at least three "carrier addresses" in verse, one to the Orangemen published in the Orange Lily in 1850, one as a poem for 1859/60 "To The Patrons of the Union (Hotel)", and one for 1871/72. These were a New Year's Day tradition of the 19th century when the paperboy, or 'carrier,' was paid for his winter's service and his review of the events of the old year with some prognostications for the new.

He compiled his 1827-Bytown to Ottawa-1877: Short Panoramic View of Ottawa's History for the New Year celebrations of the City's Golden Jubilee.,

Lett's The City of Ottawa and its Surroundings is a comprehensive tourist guide of twenty-two pages with photographs of key government buildings. Commissioned by the Ottawa City Council, it covers all matters of interest and convenience to attract tourists to attend the Grand Dominion and 39th Provincial Exhibition of Ottawa, on 22–27 September 1884. It provides a literary snapshot of the capital region for that year with historical reflections and some perspectives on its future.

== Sportsman ==
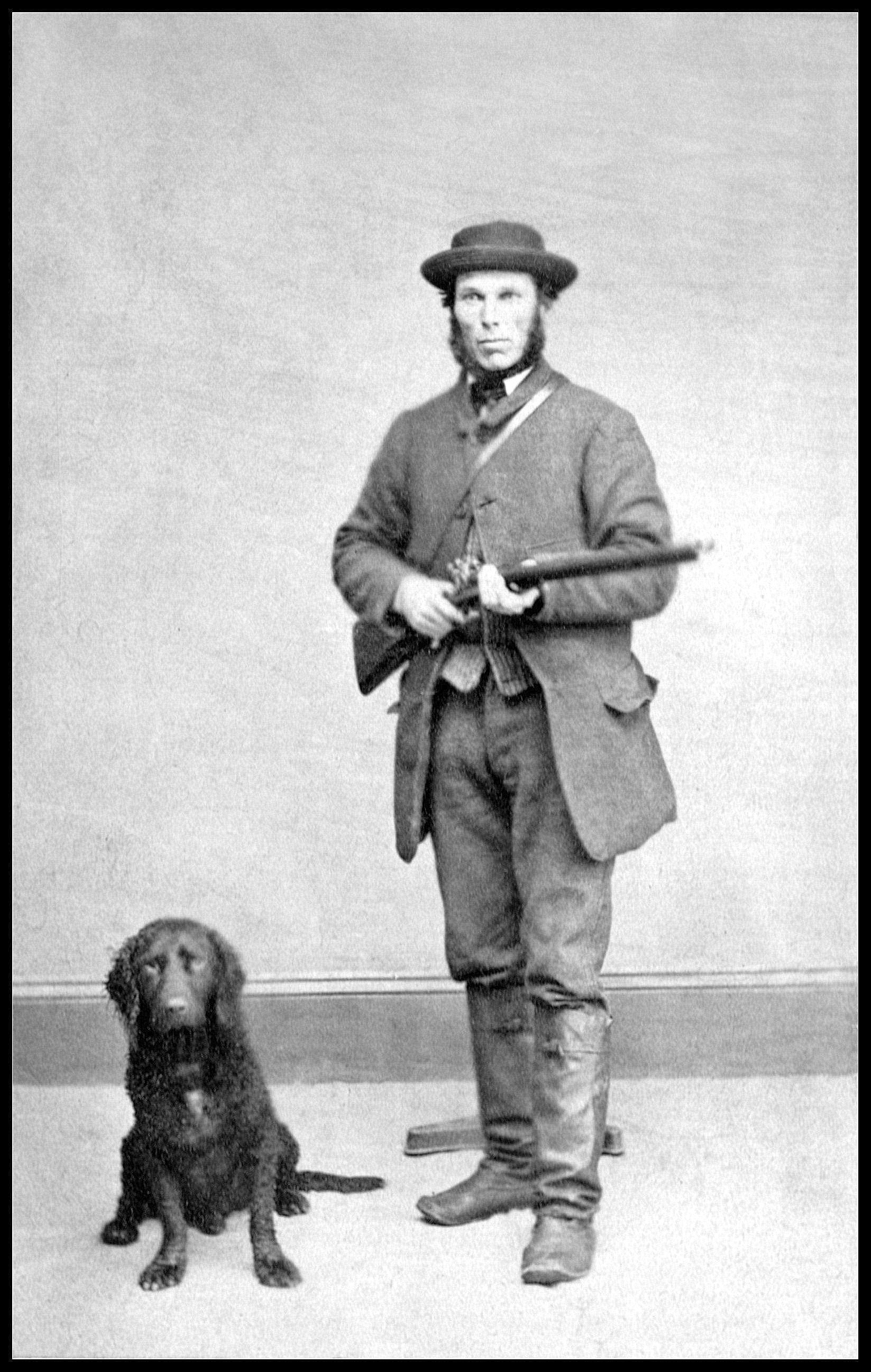
William Pittman Lett with Shot Gun and Hound, ca.1865 (E. Spencer / City of Ottawa Archives)

Lett was an enthusiastic sportsman. He shot birds, fished from his birch-bark canoe, and camped out on yearly deer hunting expeditions with his personal hounds and a band of close friends including the Iroquois hunter, Eustache. His was a nature born to love nature, and no boy was happier than he when he could leave the haunts of men and seek the solitudes along the banks of the Ottawa and Gatineau Rivers or minor streams and 'haul the silvery shining prey from the whirling eddy's spray'. As a huntsman in the early days of Bytown, he was acquainted with every nook and corner of Carleton, Russell and Ottawa counties and he admits in his own writings that it would have been well for him had he devoted less time to such pursuits. To the last days, when he was hardly able to make his way to his desk at city hall, he would long to get away into the silence of the woods or beside the stream for a quiet fishing expedition.

It is therefore understandable that Lett related to the aboriginal belief in the spiritual hierarchy of Manitou and wrote an article on the spirits of the Manitou Rapids on the Gatineau River. He became an Honorary Chief and blood brother of the Algonquins with the name Chief Wah Bae Mimi or White Dove, although the precise rationale is unknown beyond his close affinity to aboriginal culture and his companionship with aboriginal hunting guides.

There was no Ottawa Hunt Club in the 19th century, so formal hunts involving the highest in society were organised as the occasion warranted. In 1870, one such hunt was organised for Prince Arthur during his visit to Ottawa and tour of Canada; Lett controlled the deer runway where Governor General Lord Lisgar was shooting.

As an avid hunter and patriotic armchair warrior, Lett was well versed in cannon and guns. He often alluded to progress in efficiency, accuracy and distance brought by technological advancements from muzzle to breach loading and the internal rifling of barrels. He sketched a history of military weaponry in his poem The Snider and often praised the virtues of that British army-issue rifle in defence of the Empire. He authored under his pen name Algonquin, a 30-page history of his sporting life and the evolution of guns: From the Flintlock to the Hammerless. For his 25th anniversary as Clerk, Ottawa City Council presented Lett with a high-quality fowling piece (a choke-bore hunting rifle), manufactured by W.W. Greener (of Birmingham, England).

Lett also refereed sports and was still doing it for rowing events in his old age in 1888, much as he had done on the first Dominion Day.

== Hero ==
One Sunday in the late spring of 1881, a boy named Louis Robillard tipped from a boat into the Ottawa River beside the Queen's Wharf, Ottawa's former Cholera Wharf. Lett, by then 62 years old, dove in fully clothed and grappled with the panicking youth in a dangerous current close to the stern of a flat-bottomed barge. When they surfaced, a bargeman hauled them on to a boat before they were sucked beneath the barge. Newspaper headlines declared Narrow Escape From Drowning; Gallant Rescue by our City Clerk – The Latter Nearly Meets a Watery Grave and Lett was awarded the Bronze Medal of the Royal Humane Society on 18 July 1881.

== Later life and death ==
=== Widower ===
Lett's wife, Maria Hinton, was killed on Saturday, 3 September 1881, a month shy of fifty-three years old. The rear boxcar of a train of the St. Lawrence & Ottawa Railway (SL&OR) struck her phaeton while it was being driven northwards across the tracks at the intersection of Ottawa's Dalhousie and McTaggart Streets adjacent to the company's freight sheds and passenger depot.

Lett won his case against the SL&OR for negligence. He was awarded damages of $5,800, of which $1,500 was apportioned to himself and the balance divided among the children. The SL&OR was subsequently taken over by the Canadian Pacific Railway (CPR). The Supreme Court, on a split decision, dismissed the appeal of the CPR with costs: "Although, on the death of a wife caused by negligence of a railway company, the husband cannot recover damages of a sentimental character, yet the loss of household services accustomed to be performed by the wife, which would have to be replaced by hired services, is a substantial loss for which damages may be recovered, as is also the loss to the children of the care and moral training of their mother. (Taschereau and Gwynne dissenting)". . Her death was a devastating loss for William and their children. He kept two small photographs to remind him of Maria inscribed with the same words written on 12 November 1882: "Silent in death, She speaketh still, I hear her voice, I feel her hand Greeting me in the upward path Which leads me to the Spirit Land, And O! my heart's incessant prayer Is that I yet may meet her there."

=== Retirement ===
An ageing Lett of 65 years was tiring of his City Clerkship and applied in 1884 to become Librarian to the Parliament of Canada following the death on 22 January 1884 of the incumbent, Dr. Alpheus Todd (1821–1884). Prime Minister Macdonald did not reply.

Lett retired on 31 October 1891 due to ill health. Mayor Thomas Birkett and Ottawa City Council rewarded his long service for nineteen different mayors with an annuity, a framed testimonial address calligraphed by Arthur Arcand and a magnificent gold "watch chronometer".

The society photographer and Lett's long-time hunting companion, William Topley, wrote a touching letter on 4 October 1891 to his ailing friend enclosing a series of seasonal poems, "I have ventured to add a few verses, a poor tribute to one who has for so many years delighted us with his song".

=== Death ===
After a year of illness with seven months confined to bed by a painful cancerous growth on his hipbone, William Pittman Lett died peacefully surrounded by his family at 7:45 in the morning of Monday, 15 August 1892 in his seventy-third year. A postmortem was conducted as his long sickness has not been fully understood by his medical advisors. It proved to be metastasized cancer of the spine.

By order of the City Treasurer, Thomas Halder Kirby, the City Hall flag flew at half-mast; officials ordered a floral tribute; and Council unanimously approved a resolution of honour and a motion for a fully paid public funeral in recognition of his long and faithful services.

Lett's funeral cortege with a four-horse hearse was one of the largest ever seen in Ottawa, and included some of the oldest and most prominent citizens. It proceeded past closed stores along Ottawa's Sussex and Sparks Streets to the Dominion Methodist Church.

He was buried beside his beloved Maria on Wednesday, 17 August 1892 at Ottawa's Beechwood Cemetery, sharing a monument with the Hinton and Grant relatives.

Lett was a household name during his life and it became a source of pride for Ottawans to claim that their loved ones were immortalised in his works. Lett Street is a short residual street on Ottawa's LeBreton Flats. His grave is obscure and the monument almost indiscernible by the weathering of time. It is a poor tribute to one who had contributed so much to the heritage of Canada's capital.

== Bard ==
In all but title, Lett was Ottawa's first poet laureate producing some two hundred and twenty-two poems and songs in his lifetime not including the many snippets of verse with which he habitually embellished his public speeches. His poetry provides a poetic editorial on many personalities and events in Canada's 19th century. His topics include: affection and romance; religion; homelands; loyalty, royalty and the flag; imperial wars and warriors; sporting life; social commentary; Bytown to Ottawa; colony to nation; bereavement, grieving and solace; reflections; and poets, poetry and songsters. They are full of the religious and political fire-and-brimstone rhetoric of the time. One hundred and two were published in the newspapers or presented to an audience. In addition to newspaper publication and invited addresses to associations and society events, Lett orchestrated public recitals of traditional poetry, his favourite poets and his own works.

In his 1878 "Address to the Annual Entertainment of the St. Patrick's Literary Association", he saluted the "genius and immortality" of a long list of "statesmen, sages, warriors, philosophers, orators and poets" who had influenced his writing. His greatest influences were Burns, Walter Scott, Byron, Victor Hugo "that Moses of the modern gospel of Freedom, Humanity and Romance" and his favourite, the Irish bard Thomas Moore .

However, contemporary anthologists were not impressed. Mrs. C.M. Whyte-Edgar, in her Wreath of Canadian Song published in 1910, listed Lett "among others, writing since the middle of the last century, [who] won, in some cases, more than local attention". His short biography was included by C. C. James in A Bibliography of Canadian Poetry, published in 1899. One of his poems, "Call Me by My Christian Name", was included in E. H. Dewart's 1864 Selections of Canadian Poets.

Lett was too busy to take the time to publish an anthology of his own poetry other than his Recollections and the "British Connexion". The former, written in near doggerel cemented his obscurity in Canadian literary history. His archived papers show evidence that a personally selected anthology was in the works. If it had been carefully edited and published, he may well have gained a better recognition in the Canadian poetic canon.

William Pittman Lett is a poet in the Canadian Victorian tradition, who chronicled in verse the rise of Bytown to Ottawa and the evolution of the colony to nationhood, in the context of his own life and the international events of the nineteenth century. He was a Confederation poet, bridging the 19th century to the poetic innovations of the popularly named Confederation School of poets.
