= 1847 Bytown municipal election =

Town Council election in Bytown, Canada

September 11, 1847	1848 →
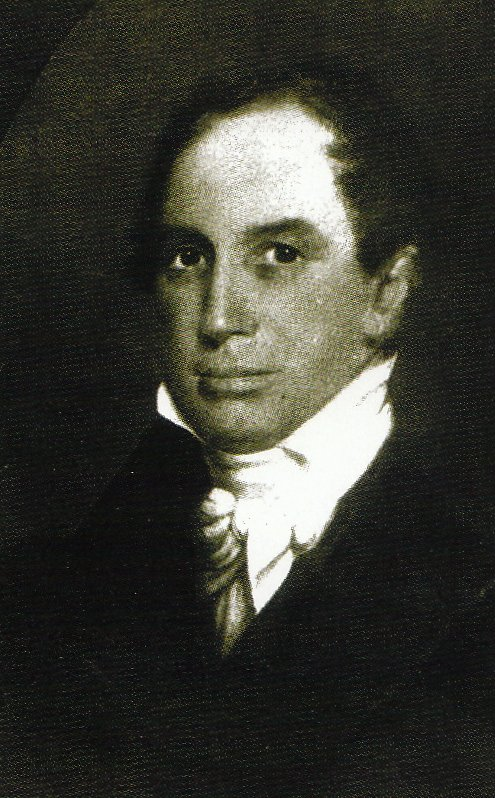

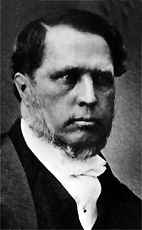
Nominee	John Scott	John Bower Lewis
Party	Reform	Tory
Council vote	4	3
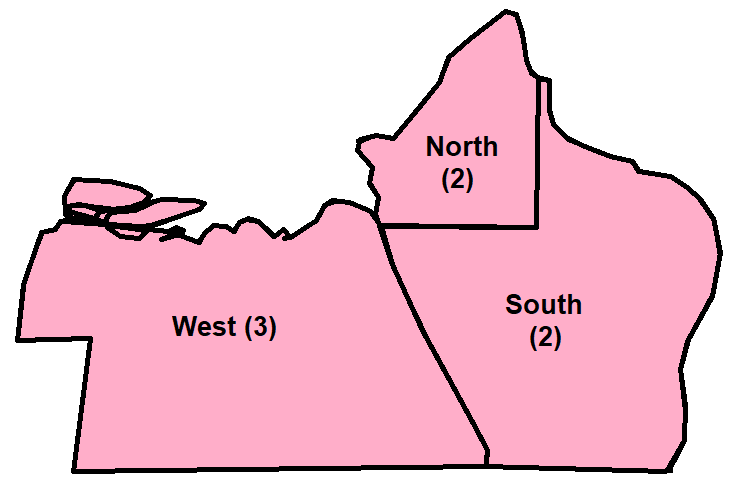
- Map of Bytown's Wards, used from 1847 to 1849
Mayor before election
None
Elected mayor
John Scott

The newly incorporated Town of Bytown, Canada West (now Ottawa) held a municipal election on September 11, 1847, to elect members of the first Bytown Town Council. Franchise was granted to men over the age of 21 who were freeholders with a land value of at least £30, tenants with an annual rent of at least £10, or leaseholders who had built a house with an annual rent of at least £10.

== Town Council ==
For the election, Bytown was divided into three wards, West, North and South. West Ward, consisting of the Upper Town portion of the town (now Downtown Ottawa) returned three councillors, while the North and South wards located in Lower Town returned two councillors each. Lower Town had a slight majority of councillors, but this did not fully reflect their large majority in numbers of householders. West Ward had three councillors for 234 householders, while the Lower Town wards had four councillors for 645 householders. This gerrymander was said to support the Tories living in Upper Town at the expense of the Reformers in Lower Town. Further, the division of Lower Town into two wards was seen as an attempt to divide the Francophone and Irish communities and commercial interests.

North Ward (2 to be elected)
Candidate	Votes	%
Henry J. Friel	131	38.19
John Bedard	109	31.78
Charles* Sparrow	103	30.03

South Ward (2 to be elected)
Candidate	Votes	%
Thomas Corcoran	92	42.40
John Scott	92	42.40
Andrew* Main	33	15.21

West Ward (3 to be elected)
Candidate	Votes	%
John Bower Lewis	89	28.53
Nicholas Sparks	78	25.00
Nathaniel Sherrald Blasdell	63	20.19
W. N.* Burrows	42	13.46
Robert* Stanley	28	8.97
James* Kennedy	9	2.88
Lyman* Perkins	3	0.96

* First names of candidates were omitted from the source document, so in these cases candidates' first names or initials were taken from 1851 Bytown Canada Directory, assuming they were the same people

== Mayor ==
On September 18, after the council election, the members voted for a mayor from among their ranks. The Tory councillors from Upper Town supported John Bower Lewis, and the Reform councillors from Lower Town supported John Scott. As Lower Town had four members to Upper Town's three, Scott was elected mayor.
