= Henry J. Friel =

Canadian politician

Henry James Friel
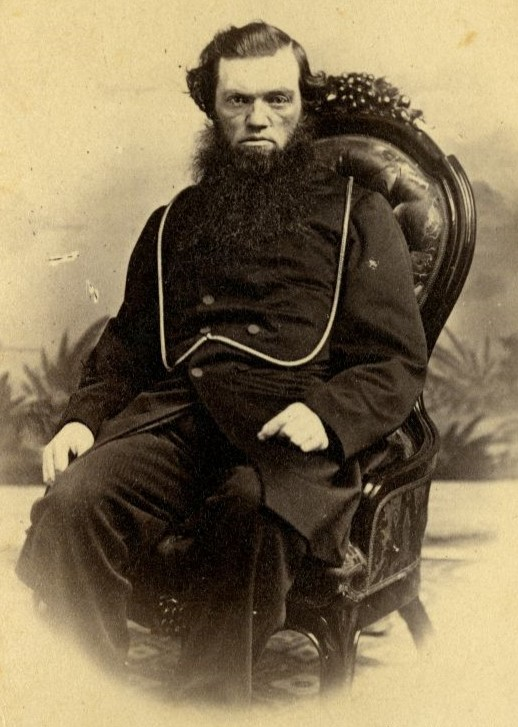
- Henry James Friel Henry J. Friel, 1863

Mayor of Bytown
- In office 1854–1854
- Preceded by: Joseph-Balsora Turgeon
- Succeeded by: John Bower Lewis

4th Mayor of Ottawa
- In office 1863–1864
- Preceded by: Alexander Workman
- Succeeded by: Moss Kent Dickinson
- In office 1868–1869
- Preceded by: Robert Lyon
- Succeeded by: John Rochester

Personal details
- Born: 15 April 1823 Montreal, Lower Canada, British North America
- Died: 16 May 1869 (aged 46) Ottawa, Ontario, Canada

Henry James Friel (15 April 1823 – 16 May 1869) was mayor of Bytown in 1854 and then of Ottawa in 1863 and 1868–1869.

He was born in Montreal to Irish Catholic parents Charles Friel and Cecila Brennan on 15 April 1823. His family moved to Bytown, which was later renamed Ottawa, in 1827.

== Political life ==
Friel was elected to Bytown's first town council in 1847. He was defeated the following year, but was elected alderman in 1850, 1853 and 1854, when he was elected mayor. He was part of the first Common School Trustees of Bytown in 1848, and was later a trustee for the Separate Schools in 1864 He also served on the executive of the Bytown Mechanics' Institute. In September 1849, he was arrested during the Stony Monday Riot, but was ultimately released.

The municipality of Bytown became the new City of Ottawa in 1855. Friel, as the last mayor of Bytown, was a major proponent of the municipality getting city status. He was elected alderman in Ottawa from 1855 to 1858 and in 1864, 1865 and 1867. He served as mayor in 1863, 1868, and 1869.

In 1863, he was a member of the first Board of Police Commissioners for Ottawa. The board, with the aim of avoiding unnecessary expense, originally concluded that there was no need for a salaried police force in the city. However, in May that same year, the militia had to be called in to control a riot in the city. In 1865, a bylaw was introduced establishing an official police force.

In 1868, while mayor, Friel posted a proclamation announcing a $2,000 reward for information leading to the conviction of the assassin of Thomas D'Arcy McGee. He also contributed $2,000 of his own money for the reward.

== Professional life ==
In his youth, Friel apprenticed under Alexander James Christie, owner of the Bytown Gazette.

In 1846, Friel purchased the Bytown Packet, a local newspaper, with John George Bell. It had been established the year prior by William Harris, with Bell serving as its printer. Friel & Bell, as they were called, published the Packet from a building beside the St. Lawrence or Rideau Hotel on Rideau Street. The office moved at the end of April 1847 to a building known as the Old Market-House on George St., which adjoined the Marketplace. They sold this paper at the end of October 1849 to Robert Bell, who renamed it the Ottawa Citizen in 1851.

In 1858, he established a new paper, the Ottawa Union, later called the Daily Union, which operated from Union Block at the corner of York and Sussex in Lowertown. Friel's brother-in-law, Roderick Edward O'Connor, who was originally a partner in the Union, also published the Ottawa Tribune, a Catholic newspaper, from this office from the early 1860s until 1865. In 1860, George Hugo Perry became a Friel's partner in the Union. Friel sold the Union in 1866 to George Cotton, who operated a rival paper, the Ottawa Times.

== Personal life ==
Friel was born on 15 April 1823 in Montreal to Charles Friel and Cecila Brennan. He was baptized at the Notre Dame Church in Montreal on 20 April 1823 under the name Henry Jacques Friel. His family moved to Bytown in 1827 when Friel was just four years old.

His father died on 17 February 1832 after accidentally falling in his home. His mother may have died about a year later, as a sermon about Henry's life, delivered after his death, stated that he had been orphaned at the age of ten. It is unclear if Friel had any siblings who survived childhood. He is known to have had four brothers, but two died in infancy, and the fate of the other two is unknown. They were the following:

- Charles Friel (c. 1820 - 27 Aug 1823)
- Charles John Friel (3 Apr 1824 - 18 Jun 1825)
- William Michael Friel (29 Sep 1825 - unknown)
- Charles Friel (7 Sep 1832 - unknown): Charles was born almost seven months after his father's death.

On 8 June 1848, he married Mary Ann O'Connor, daughter of Daniel O'Connor, a prominent local merchant, and Margaret Power. A. H. D. Ross's history of Ottawa stated that Mary Ann O'Connor was the first white girl born in Bytown, and that the name Mary Ann was requested by Colonel John By himself. However, Ross also gave her date of birth as 2 April 1827, which would precede the O'Connor's arrival in the settlement that May.

Based on baptismal and burial records, Henry and Mary Ann had at least 14 children together, but most died in infancy or early childhood. Only the youngest three lived to or beyond adolescence.

- Maria Margaret Friel (born and died 21 Jan 1849)
- Ann or Anna Friel (3 Sep 1849 - bef. 1852): Did not appear with the family in the 1851 Census (taken in Jan 1852) or any subsequent records. Based on the known birth of her older sister Maria Margaret, Ann would have been born premature.
- Mary Friel (14 - 15 Jun 1850)
- Teresa Cecilia Friel (9 - 23 May 1851)
- Elizabeth Friel (16 Feb 1852 - bef. 1861): Did not appear with the family in the 1861 Census or any subsequent records. Elizabeth may have been premature as she was born almost exactly nine months after her sister. Another daughter was born the following year with the middle name Elizabeth, indicating that this Elizabeth may have died before February 1853.
- Clara Elizabeth Friel (9 Feb 1853 - 23 Aug 1853)
- Mary Ann Friel (9 Jun 1854 - 24 Feb 1857)
- Charles O'Connor Louis Friel (8 Jul 1856 - 31 Aug 1857)
- Daniel O'Connor Friel (5 May 1858 - bef. 1861): Did not appear with the family in the 1861 Census or any subsequent records.
- Mary Clara Friel (13 Aug 1861 - bef. 1871): Did not appear with the family in the 1871 Census or any subsequent records.
- Henry James Friel (3 Nov 1862 - 10 Jul 1863)
- Henry Joseph Friel (also referred to as Henry James Friel) (13 Feb 1864 - 7 Jun 1940)
- Mary Theresa "Tessie" Friel (24 Jan 1866 - 25 Aug 1900)
- Francis Joseph Robert Friel (10 May 1869 - 7 Apr 1884)

He died in Ottawa on 16 May 1869 of pneumonia while still in office. He left a widow and three small children, the youngest only six days old. Flags on all public buildings were flown at half-mast until after his funeral, which was held on 19 May 1869 in Notre-Dame Cathedral (Ottawa). A funeral sermon was delivered by Aeneas Mcdonell Dawson. Businesses closed during the funeral as a mark of respect for Friel. A motion was passed in the House of Commons on 18 May, stating that when the House adjourned for the evening, it would not resume until after the funeral. Sir John A. Macdonald, who seconded the motion, noted that "from the high esteem in which the mayor of the city, Mr. Friel, was held, many members were anxious to attend the funeral." A report of the funeral noted that Macdonald was in attendance, along with his fellow Fathers of Confederation Sir Samuel Leonard Tilley and Sir George-Étienne Cartier.

Friel was originally buried at the Roman Catholic cemtetery in Sandy Hill. However, when Notre Dame Cemetery on Montreal Road was established in 1872, most of the grave markers and remains from the Catholic cemetery in Sandy Hill were moved there. His gravestone, now in Notre Dame Cemetery, reads:

Sacred to
the memory of
Henry James Friel

One of Ottawa's best friends
and most active public men.
Who in the bloom of manhood
and while in the discharge
of his duties, as mayor of
the city, was stricken down
by sickness and died May 16th
1869, aged 45 years.
His unexpected death cast a
gloom on the whole city. A public
funeral was decreed and his remains
were deposited here with all the honors
a grateful and sympathising people
could bestow.

May he rest in peace
