= Alexander Workman =

Canadian politician

3rd Mayor of Ottawa
- In office 1860–1862
- Preceded by: Edward McGillivray
- Succeeded by: Henry J. Friel

Personal details
- Born: 28 May 1798 Lisburn, County Antrim, Ireland
- Died: 12 December 1891 (aged 93) Ottawa, Ontario, Canada
- Spouse(s): Mary Abbot, m. 1820

Alexander Workman (28 May 1798 – 12 December 1891) was an Anglo-Irish-Canadian politician and the mayor of Ottawa from 1860 to 1862.

== Life ==
Workman was born in Lisburn, County Antrim, Ireland. He settled in Huntley Township in Upper Canada in 1820. In 1823, he joined his brother in Montreal, where he helped operate an academy, before moving to Bytown in 1845 and establishing a hardware business there with a fellow Unitarian Edward Griffin. He became influential in attempts to organise a Unitarian Church in Ottawa but was ultimately unsuccessful. He was a city council member for many years, finally becoming mayor in 1860 and 1861. His wife, Mary Abbot, died on 23 April 1874, at the age of 72. She is buried in Beechwood Cemetery. Workman died at the age of 93.

Preceded by Edward McGillivray	Mayor of Ottawa; 1860-1862	Succeeded by Henry J. Friel
