= Bytown Mechanics' Institute =

Upper Canada knowledge transfer organization

Bytown Mechanics' Institute.
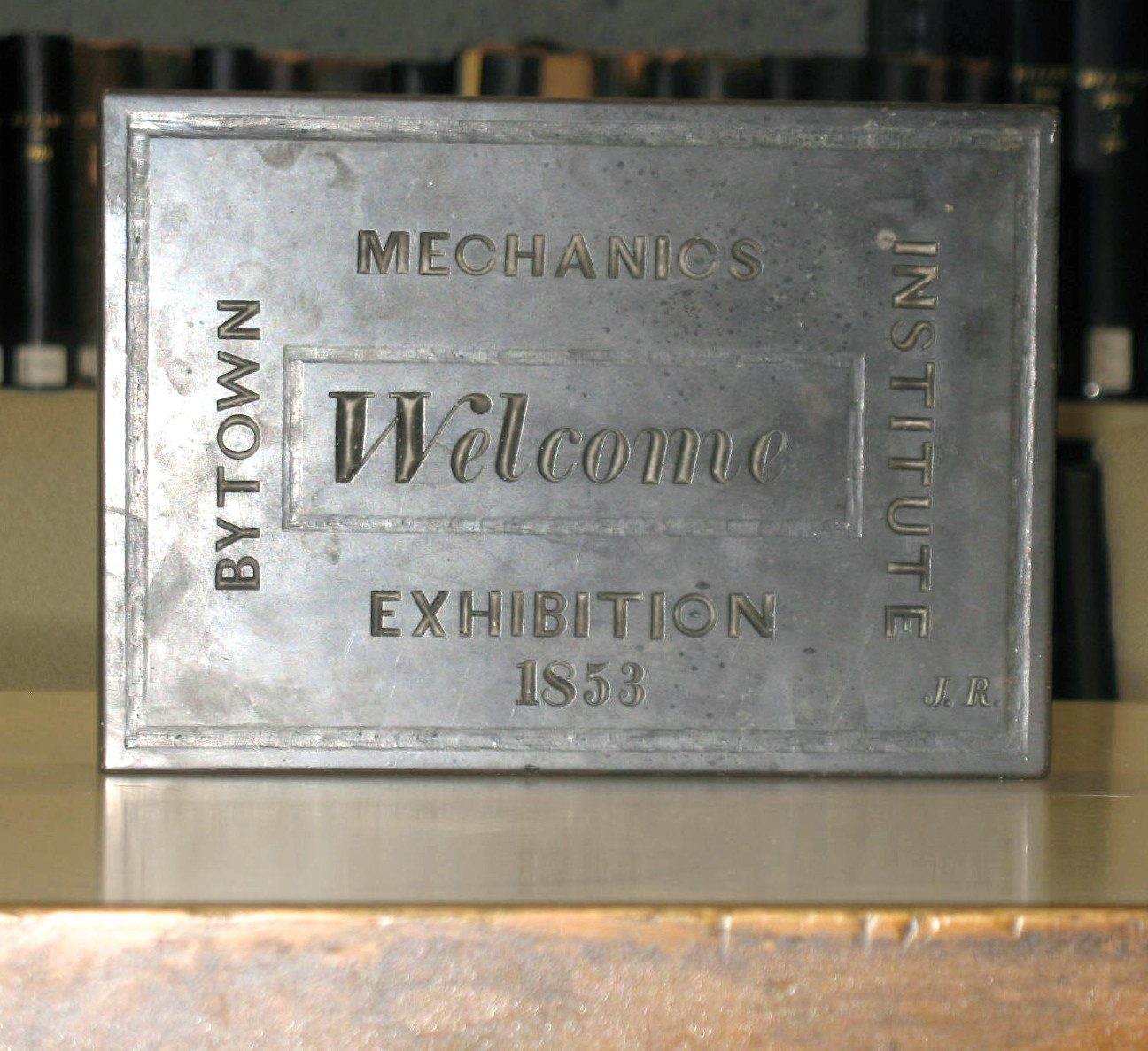
- Type: Mechanics' Institute
- Established: 1847
- Branches: Prior to 1863, in the Temperance Hall of the Congregational Church near Sappers' Bridge; post 1863.

Collection
- Items collected: Daily local papers; tri-weeklies including 2 French, one from Dublin, one from Glasgow; 29 weeklies including Scientific American and Canada West; 4 illustrated papers including Punch and London Illustrated News; United Kingdom periodicals.
- Size: In 1856, 1004 volumes
- Criteria for collection: The Library Associations and Mechanics' Institutes Act of 1851

Other information
- Budget: ad hoc, however $50-$600 annually might be expected from government sources
- Director: 1847: Hon. Thomas McKay -- President; G. W. Baker -- Vice President; Hamnett Hill -- 2nd Vice President; Elkanah Billings -- Corresponding Sec.; H. Bishoprick -- Recording Sec.; Andrew Drummond -- Treasurer
- Employees: 1 librarian

The Bytown Mechanics' Institute is an Upper Canada example of a knowledge transfer organization aimed at encouraging grassroots participation. These institutions were Victorian and moralistic in tone and class-oriented in structure which, in part, explains their failure. However, they show the tendency towards democratic institutions in the early history of Canada where the border between the United States and Canada was more fluid than in the present era and encourage such ideals. These institutions attempted to include the working class, French Canadians and women, where the British social model did not support these inclusions. The composition of the executive of the Bytown Mechanics' Institute in its various formations illustrates this and exemplifies the issues of cost and available leisure time that would eventually cause the institute's failure.

== Origins ==
In the 1830s, newsrooms were beginning to open in Bytown, Upper Canada. Newsrooms were spaces where reading materials, especially newspapers, were made available presumably to those who subscribed and paid for the materials. Newsrooms were set up in the British Hotel in Upper Town and another in McArthur's Hotel in Lower Town. The longevity of these organizations was influenced by the long hours of the working class.

In 1845, clerks in Bytown organized The Mercantile Library Association. This association appears to have been an extension of the Upper Town newsroom as both were housed in the British Hotel.

== Institute timeline ==
The lifespan of the BMI was relatively short, and the institute does not appear to have merged with any other organizations. The timelines of the BMIA, the Ottawa Natural History Society and the Ottawa Literary and Scientific Society are blended as three naturally related organizations.

- Bytown Mechanics' Institute — 1847–1849
- Bytown Mechanics' Institute and Athenaeum — 1853–1869
- Ottawa Natural History Society — 1863–1869
- Ottawa Literary and Scientific Society — 1869 – c. 1907

== History ==
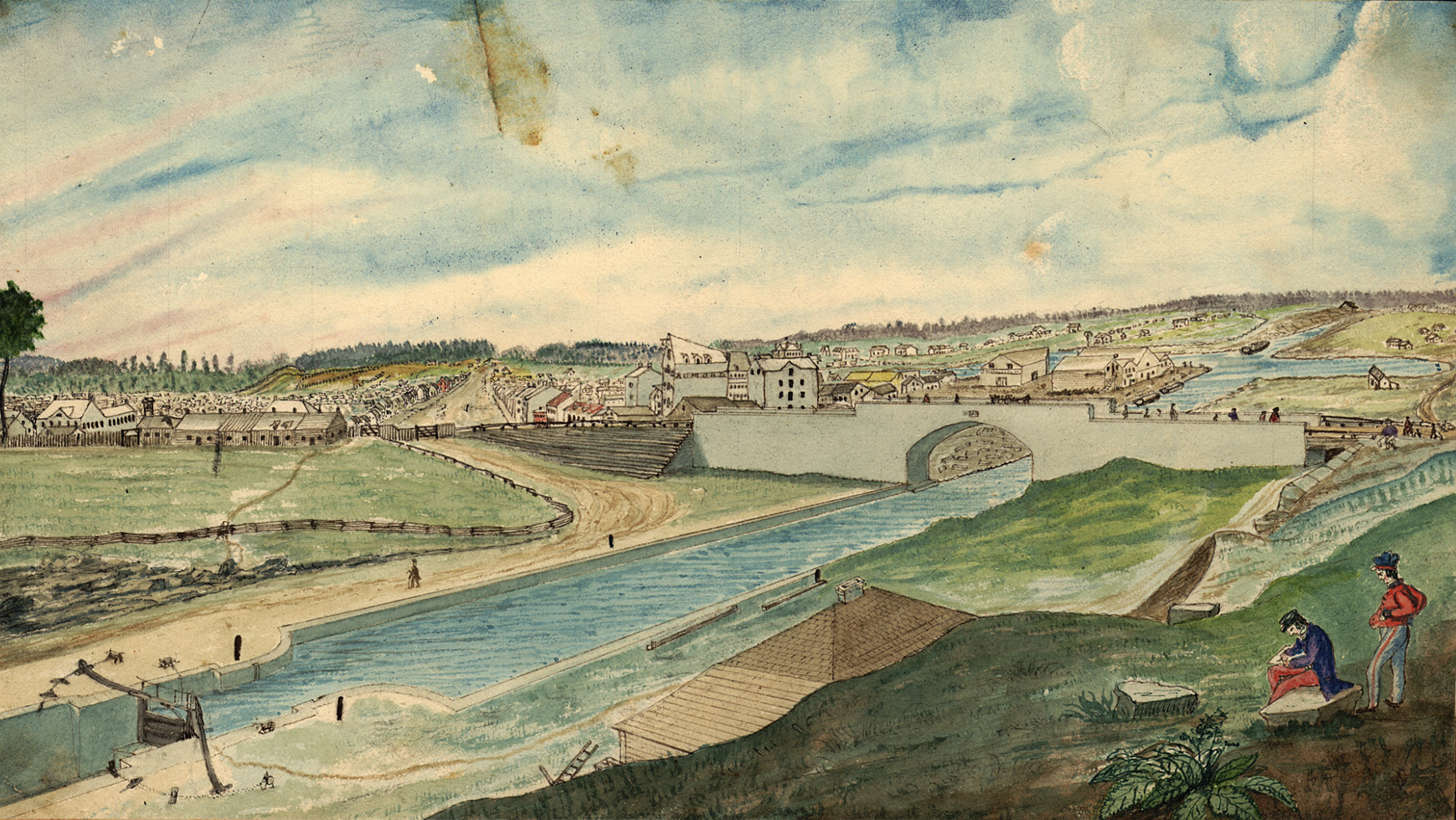
Lower Bytown, from the Barrack Hill, near the head of the Eighth Lock and Sappers' Bridge, 1845

=== Bytown Mechanics' Institute ===
The Bytown Mechanics' Institute (BMI) was established in 1847. This first Mechanics' Institute was not long-lived and closed two years later. The Bytown Mechanics' Institute and Athenaeum (BMIA) was officially established January 29, 1853.

The Bytown Mechanics' Institute differed from the newsrooms in that the founding fathers were not clerks or members of the working class; they were employers and professionals. The social leaders of Bytown formed the BMI: Hon. Thomas McKay, George W. Baker, Horatio Blasdell, John Scott, William P. Lett, John Bower Lewis and all resident clergymen.

Lack of participation had several causes. First, the subscription fee of five shillings was likely too high for the majority of the area's inhabitants. Second, it is unlikely that there were enough working men who would be attracted to such an organization. Lumberjacks were largely French-speaking and used French language institutions. For anglophones, the Carpenters' and Joiners' Society had largely the same purpose. Third, fund raising events were generally failures. Finally, and most critically, there was no newspaper support or advertising. The continuity of the BMI through to the BMIA was broken between 1850 and 1852.

French Canadian membership, although sparse, stopped in 1849 after the Stony Monday Riot in September. Local francophones formed their own similar organization, Institute canadien français d'Ottawa, in 1852. The stratification of Ottawa was both social and cultural.

=== Bytown Mechanics' Institute and Athenaeum ===
The Bytown Mechanics' Institute and Athenaeum began in January 1853. The BMIA had strong support from Robert Bell the publisher of The Ottawa Citizen. As required, a declaration dated January 29, 1853 was sent to the Provincial Government requesting incorporation. The Province of Canada provided the incorporation, and fees were set at one pound annually. Donations to the new BMIA included a recently shot heron, a hawk, a crow and a box of Indian stone implements.

In 1856, the BMIA changed its name to the Ottawa Mechanics' Institute and Athenaeum to reflect the name change of the town. Later, in 1868/9 the Ottawa Natural History Society and the Ottawa Mechanics' Institute and Athenaeum were merged by Provincial Act into the Ottawa Literary and Scientific Society.

The real change in fortune came in 1906 with the opening of the Carnegie Library. The change did not favour the BMIA, but rather favoured the Public Library movement in Ontario. Public libraries became the norm in Ontario after the private funding of the Carnegie Institute began. By February 28, 1855, the BMIA had 899 volumes, 33 newspapers and periodicals, and 850 natural specimens.

== Events ==
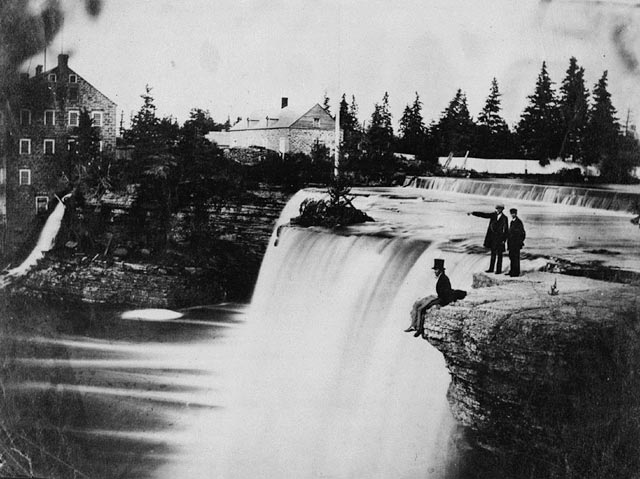
View of Rideau Falls. The buildings in the background are the McKay and McKinnon cloth mill.

Lord Elgin opened the first BMIA exhibition held in the West Ward Town Hall on July 28, 1853. The exhibition was primarily a local affair. On display were:

- • tweeds from Thomas McKay's factory
- • window blinds from Currier, Dickenson and Company
- • hemp from Hull-grown flax
- • a fine set of false teeth from a local dentist.

== Lecture sample ==
Lectures were considered a staple of the Mechanics' Institute. Improving the mind of the common man was the ultimate goal of the Mechanics' Institute. The following is a sample of lectures made available through the BMIA. Although never intended for them, women attended the lectures in significant numbers.

Year	Lecture Title	Lecture Type and Author
1856	War and Military Glory	Moralistic lecture by Rev. William Aitken
	Modes of detecting Criminal Poisonings	Scientific lecture by S. C. Sewell
	Woman, her Duties and her Rights	Moralistic lecture by Reverend Thomas Wardrope
1864	Conversazione	An evening of short popular essays
	Picnics	Meant to include women and families
1865	Human Happiness	Moralistic lecture by Rev. Johnson
	The Herpetology of the Ottawa	Zoological Lecture by Van Courtlandt
	Geological Structures of Ottawa	Scientific lecture by Grant
1866	Common Words and Phrases as Indicative of National Character	Moralistic lecture by E. A. Meredity

== Membership sample ==
Membership in the BMI had been based almost solely on high social status although the membership was intended to be working class status. While the BMIA was not immune to this type of social patronage in its executive, it did allow women membership and some limited democratic involvement in the executive. The democratic nature of the executive could be seen in the inclusion of Roman Catholics. This type of inclusion was not common across Upper Canada or, later, the province of Ontario and it speaks to the numbers of Irish immigrants and the relatively large francophone population in the area as a whole.

Name	Occupation
George Hay	Businessman
Braddish Billings	Senior Bookkeeper, Bytown and Prescott Railway
Henry J. Friel	City of Ottawa Politician
A. Workman	City of Ottawa Politician
Thomas Austin	Architect
Hamnet Hill	Physician
E. Van Cortlandt	Physician
J. Garvey	Labourer
J. A. Grant	Physician and Surgeon

== See also ==
- Libraries & the Cultural Record
- Bytown
- Ottawa Public Library
