= Robert Hervey =

Canadian politician (1820–1903)

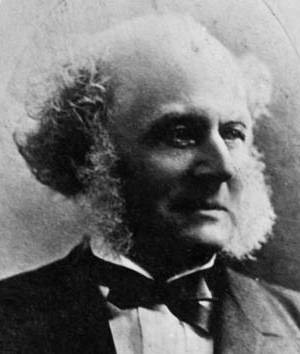
- Robert Hervey Source: Library and Archives Canada, C-002049

Mayor of Bytown
- In office 1849–1849
- Preceded by: John Bower Lewis
- Succeeded by: John Scott

Personal details
- Born: August 10, 1820 Glasgow, Scotland
- Died: December 16, 1903 (aged 83) Chicago, Illinois, United States

Robert Hervey (August 10, 1820 – December 16, 1903) was the third mayor of Bytown in 1849. He was a Canadian and later American lawyer.

He was born in Glasgow in 1820. He came to Canada where he studied law and was admitted to the bar in 1842. He partnered in a law practice in Bytown with John Bower Lewis. Hervey was mayor at the time of the Stony Monday Riot where supporters of Hervey, a Tory, clashed with Reformists in what is now the Byward Market area. In 1852, he moved to Chicago, where he continued to practice law. He was one of the founding members of the Chicago Bar Association.

Preceded by John Bower Lewis	Mayor of Bytown; 1849	Succeeded by John Scott
