= Bytown and Prescott Railway =

Canadian railway in Ottawa

The Bytown and Prescott Railway (B&PR) was a railway joining Ottawa (then called Bytown) with Prescott on the Saint Lawrence River, in the Province of Canada. The company was incorporated in 1850, and the first train ran from Prescott into Bytown on Christmas Day, 1854. The 84 kilometres (52 mi) railway, Ottawa's first to outside markets, was initially used to ship lumber collected on the Ottawa River for further shipping along the St. Lawrence to markets in the United States and Montreal.

Bytown became Ottawa in 1855, and the railway changed its name to match, becoming the Ottawa and Prescott Railway (O&PR). The operating company went bankrupt and re-formed in 1866 as the St. Lawrence and Ottawa Railway. The line was eventually taken over in 1884 by Canadian Pacific Railway who used it as a link between Ottawa and their mainlines along the St. Lawrence. Other routes, notably the Canada Central Railway running only 20 kilometres (12 mi) to the west, provided shorter runs to the Toronto area, and several direct routes to Montreal were already available. The Ottawa and Prescott saw decreasing use, and rails were eventually pulled up starting in 1966.

The railway's right of way parallels Highway 416 for much of its length, and is easily visible from the ground and air. It is particularly prominent where it passes under Highway 401 just west of the 416 terminus outside Prescott. Short portions in the Ottawa area remain in use for a variety of services, most notably O-Train Line 2.

== History ==
=== Origins ===
Bytowners had been promoting their town as the capital of Canada since the 1840s. At the time the town's only connections with the world were via dirt road, the Ottawa River to Montreal and the Rideau Waterway to Kingston. The Ottawa River was a major route for the shipping of logs from the interior of Upper Canada, especially the areas now part of Algonquin Park, to Quebec City where they were loaded on ships for sales in Europe.

The first mention of a rail link to the St. Lawrence River dates to 1848, Railways were developing in the United States at this point, and there were plans for a line to Ogdensburg, New York, directly opposite Prescott. There were also talks about a railway connecting Montréal to Toronto, which would form as the Grand Trunk Railway in 1852. It was expected these lines would pass along the north shore of the St. Lawrence, through Prescott.

Former Bytown mayor and cabinet minister Richard William Scott recalled that in early 1850, he and Edward McGillivray (Ottawa's second mayor) discussed the need for a rail connection of Bytown with the "contemplated trunk which was to unite Montreal and Toronto". This compelled Scott to prepare a petition asking for an act incorporating a company to construct a railway between Bytown and Prescott. The charter was obtained the following month in August 1850, and a meeting of the promoters was held in the Town Hall at the Lower Town Market, where Robert Bell, later to become secretary of the company, was meeting secretary. John McKinnon was chosen as president, and Walter Shanly was appointed engineer. Bell was the owner of what would become the Ottawa Citizen.

At the northern end of the proposed route, the natural location for the terminus would be just upstream of the Chaudière Falls, where logs could be loaded directly off the river onto trains. Only a few hundred meters upstream the river widened on the southern bank, forming a wide area of calm water with the small inlet of Nepean Bay in the southeastern corner. On the eastern side of the bay was a large area of flat land known as LeBreton Flats (now the name of the entire area), perfect for a railway yard. This area had originally been selected for the Rideau Canal, but a land swindle led to it being moved to a far less advantageous location downstream from the Chaudière Falls.

Initial purchases of stock were slow, far too small to pay for construction. Thomas McKay offered to buy a considerable proportion of the shares in exchange for moving the northern terminus to industrial land he owned in New Edinburgh, further down the Ottawa River. This location was not nearly as practical for logging, as it required logs to be formed into booms to transit a timber slide at the Chaudière Falls, moved only a few kilometres, and then un-boomed and hoisted up to the top of the hills near where the French embassy stands today.

Even with this infusion of cash there was not enough money; further funds were eventually raised from the towns along the proposed routes, which would be paid to the railway as a bonus on completion. These bonuses were highly controversial, as they were raised by local taxes. These bonuses were used by the Bytown government to take out loans: $60,000 in 1851 and $200,000 in 1853.

=== Selecting a route ===
The endpoints of the railway were effectively selected before surveying began; the southern terminus would be at the docks in Prescott, while the northern end would be in New Edinburgh. Between these two points was considerable swampland, and Shanly had to wait until winter froze the ground to survey a route. With two assistants, Shanly walked out three possible routes in March 1851. A route through Kemptville was chosen. In September 1851, a contract to clear the land was offered to French & Co., and Shanly had already advertised for certain sections of the grading. Ground was broken with great fanfare on 9 October 1851, starting with a parade.

=== Construction ===
In 1852, the company acquired land, ordered rails and other materials, and started to clear and grade the route. But it was slow work, and it was not until early 1854 that the route was prepared and various rivers and streams fully bridged by wooden trestles. The first half of the rail shipment had arrived in the fall of 1853 and the second in the spring of 1854.

At this point an odd dispute broke out between the railway and the Grand Trunk Telegraph Company, which had laid poles along the route. The railway sent out men to cut down the poles, claiming that the Telegraph did not obtain permission to use the lines. The outcome of this dispute is not recorded, but the telegraph was in operation when the railway opened.

Laying the rails began on 24 April 1854, starting in the Prescott yards. (Note: S. Robert Elliot's unpublished work on the Bytown and Prescott places the date on 1 May) By May the main lines were being run. On 9 May the first steam locomotive for the line reached Ogdensburg. This was an 0-4-0 switcher, named "Oxford", that shipped across the river on the 19th, along with a number of gravel and lumber cars. On 21 June the railway carried its first official passengers between Prescott and Spencerville, at a price of three York Shillings each way. On 8 July two additional locomotives, freight 4-4-0's "St. Lawrence" and "Ottawa", together with several gravel cars, were brought over the river.

On 10 August the line reached Kemptville. Passenger service from Bytown opened at the end of the month, starting with a steamer ride down the Rideau Canal to Beckett's Landing, then a short distance by stage coach to the station in Kemptville. Regular service opened on 9 September. By 4 November the line had reached (South) Gloucester and the passenger route now started with a stage coach to what became Manotick Station. The line reached Billings Bridge on 2 December, and Montreal Road on the 16th. However, the bridge over the Rideau south of Green Island, from the eastern New Edinburgh side of the river to the downtown area, was not completed at this time.

The original (Bytown) Sussex Street Station, was located at what is today External Affairs' Lester B. Pearson Building. The station had opened in late December 1854 or early January 1855, although the trains did not yet reach this point. There were numerous spurs in the area, as well as across the river on the New Edinburgh side.

The actual date of arrival of the first train is in doubt. There is considerable oral history stating that the St. Lawrence arrived at Sussex on Christmas Day 1854, with Robert Graham as engineer and Mike Mahar as fireman. However, there are also published accounts stating that the trains still stopped at Montreal Road on that same day, and passengers were carried to Sussex on horse drawn cabs. According to Scott, it wasn't until April 1855 that "the first train crossed the bridge over the Rideau River to the station at Sussex Street".

=== Persistent rumour ===
One persistent rumour about the railway is that the company once again ran out of money just after reaching Billings, and the rest of the rails were initially laid as "snakeheads", wooden beams capped with iron. This was ostensibly done in order to reach the town in time for the Christmas Day opening. However, rails for the entire length of the line had already been bought and paid for, arriving months earlier. There is no reason for snakeheads to have been laid, and no documentary evidence from the era to back up the claim.

This particular story traces back to the 1894 book "Railways and Other Ways" by Myles Pennington. Other authors speculate that Pennington was actually referring to a wooden causeway of the same length far to the south of Ottawa. Although the story was known to be false even at that time, it continues to be repeated in new works, as recently as Donald Wilson's book from 1984, "The Ontario and Quebec Railway".

=== Running the line ===
In April, only a few months after the line opened, the bridge over the Rideau was damaged by ice and the station was cut off. It may be the re-opening of the bridge that Scott refers to as the "first train". The bridge continued to be a sore point for operations and suffered numerous closures. A second bridge was built over the winter of 1865-66 and the three masonry piers were rebuilt. The old bridge was removed before the spring run off in 1866. The new bridge also added a pedestrian walkway. A third wooden frame bridge was erected during the winter of 1874-1875 and opened on 2 April 1875.

One early source of income for the line was the construction of Parliament Hill. Stones for the buildings were quarried outside of Cleveland, Ohio, and shipped to Ottawa through Prescott on a scheduled train that ran every day for three years. On 7 May 1860 the Sussex station buildings caught fire, burning to the ground along with numerous freight cars.

=== St. Lawrence and Ottawa ===
Following its completion, financial difficulties ensued leading to decisions for the raising to funds to pay the debts. City council had been indebted for $60,000 in 1851 and $200,000 in 1853. In 1865, the property of the company was foreclosed in a Toronto auction at a huge loss, and money invested by towns was lost.

The company re-formed as the St. Lawrence and Ottawa Railway in 1867. On 13 December 1871 the new company completed a spur that ran northwest from a location south of Billings Bridge christened "Chaudière Junction", to the new Broad Street Station close to the current City Center Ave and Albert St. This spur followed the original planned B&PR route quite closely, finally providing freight service upstream from the Chaudière Falls at Nepean Bay.

=== Part of the CPR ===
The Canadian Pacific Railway began to examine the St. Lawrence and Ottawa as early 1881 and a formal 999-year lease was signed on 26 September 1884. The majority of the line became the Prescott Subdivision, with the original alignment between Chaudière Junction and the Sussex Street Station becoming the Sussex Street Subdivision. In January 1882, CP officials, including Van Horne, inspected the line and decided to switch away from the Sussex Street station to Broad Street, where CP was consolidating lines of the Canada Central Railway to Carleton Place and the Quebec, Montreal, Ottawa and Occidental Railway lines to Montreal and Aylmer. The station became Ottawa West Station, and a large freight switching yard opened to the north along Nepean Bay on the LeBreton Flats.

These plans were put astray when the bridge over the canal near Billings was itself rendered unsafe and traffic on the Chaudière branch was closed on 5 September 1882. All traffic was handled through Sussex Street until October 1883. On 24 August 1885, passenger service was transferred to Broad Street, leaving Sussex providing freight services only. This led to a series of back and forth measures while the city tried to keep the Sussex station in use. The Rideau bridge was once again re-built and opened on 10 June 1889, this time having been raised in an attempt to fix problems with ice, although these proved to be futile. The station was given a new lease on life due to it being a convenient location for inbound coal shipments, as well as the newly opened sawmills which provided cut lumber downstream from Chaudière.

In 1898 the Ottawa and New York Railway was about to open service when their original plans to lease lines into Ottawa along the Canada Atlantic Railway to Union Station in the downtown fell through. A new agreement was quickly arranged with CP, and passenger service returned to Sussex on 29 July 1898. The O&NYR used the station until 1 October 1901, although the bridge continued to be a problem and yet another was built in 1900, this time of steel. This finally solved the problems. CP's original plans to close Sussex Street fell by the wayside, and it continued to be used right through World War II.

In the post-war era, the National Capital Commission wanted to abandon many of the lines in the downtown area as part of their efforts to beautify the city. These plans included the removal of most of the industrial areas around the Byward Market area, and the closure of many of the existing rail lines throughout the city. The section of the Sussex Sub from Beechwood Avenue to Sussex was last used on 15 June 1964, and the section from Beechwood to Hurdman Junction on 15 June 1966. These sections were later used to form the Vanier Parkway between Highway 417 and Beechwood, with the short section north of Beechwood having run through what is today the New Edinburgh Park. The piers that carried the bridge across the river are still visible, although some of them are under the Park grounds after backfilling. King Edward Ave. uses the alignment for a short distance before turning north to cross the Ottawa River.

=== The line today ===
Several portions of the line are still in use.

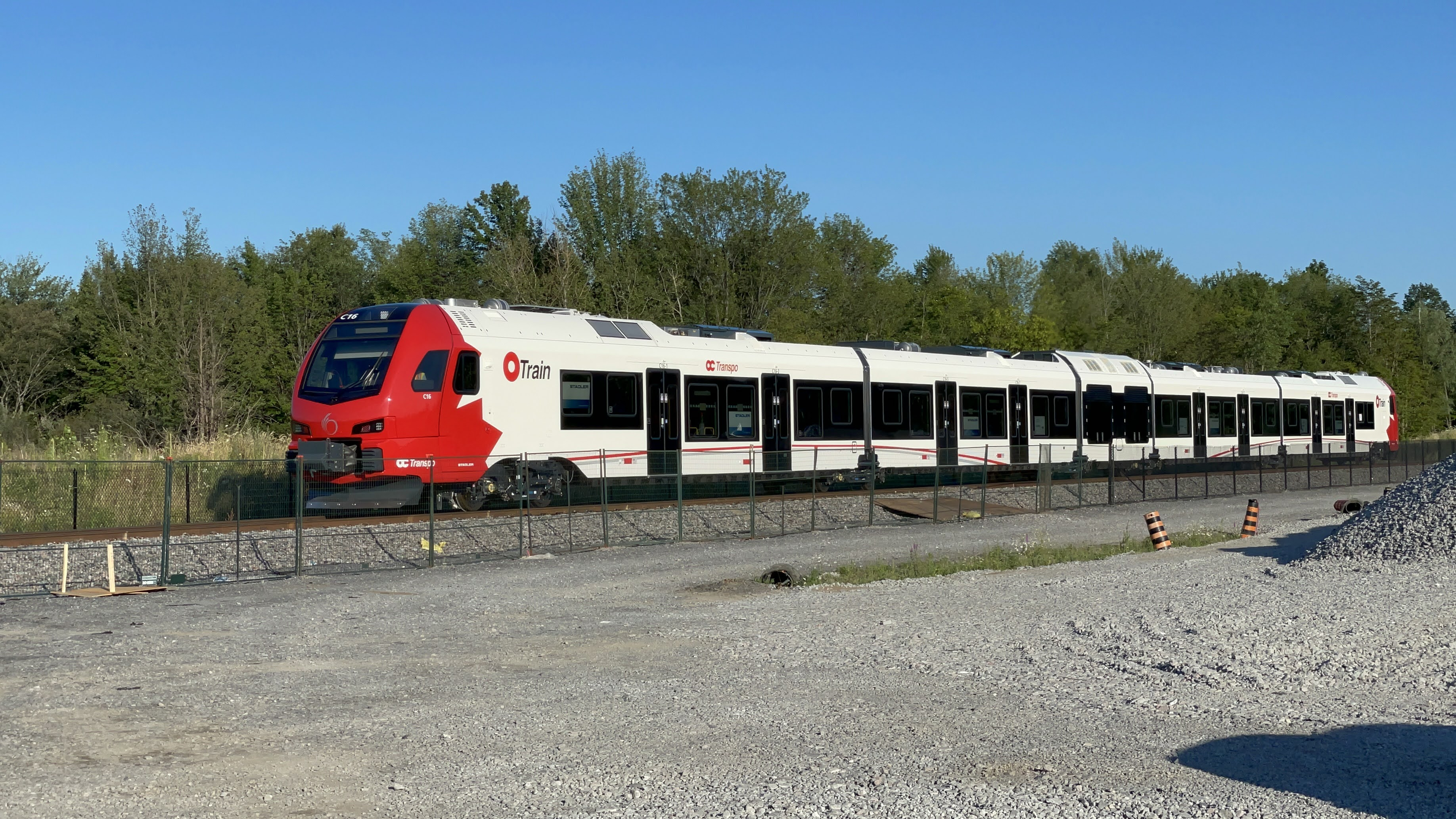
O-Train Line 2 near the airport on the former right-of-way of the Ottawa and Prescott Railway

In Ottawa, O-Train Line 2 uses the original B&PR route north from Leitrim Station, following the route to the Chaudière Falls area, and ending at Bayview Station. Bayview is some distance to the west of the original Broad Street Station. The line originally curved to the east just south of Bayview Station, a route that can still be seen in the layout of roads and buildings in the area. Line 2 runs under the Canal where Dow's Lake narrows towards the canal again, whereas the spur formerly ran over it at a location just south of Dow's Lake. The original route can easily be seen as the smoothly curving line of trees just west of the Lake, running southeast out of Dow's Lake station and continuing through the Carleton University campus. Initially, the train only runs through sections between Bayview and Greenboro, sections between Greenboro and Leitrim were opened in January 2025.

In terms of serving the airport itself, a spur at Lester Road continues to be used to supply freight cars to the National Research Council buildings. O-Train Line 2 has also used this spur as a repair depot. An extension of this spur to allow the O-Train access to the main terminal has been considered on and off on many occasions. The rails currently continue south to the border of the airport lands at Leitrim Road. The second spur, near South Keys station and toward to Ottawa International Airport, was opened in 2025 for Line 4.

The newly-build section of Line 2, after Leitrim station, spun off from the original B&PR route and towards to west. Starting at Leitrim Road, the railbed forms the Osgoode Link Pathway, running south about 20 kilometres (12 miles). to the town of Osgoode. The railbed south of Osgoode to Kemptville, about 15 kilometres (9.3 miles) away, is not currently part of the Pathway.

The line formerly became active again at a highway maintenance depot in Kemptville, and ran the short 2 kilometres (1.2 miles) distance south to the CPR lines (the former Ontario and Quebec Railway), before being taken up during the summer of 2014. The town of Kemptville was formed, in part, in order to escape paying the bonuses for construction of the B&P promised by the town of Oxford Mills, a few kilometres to the southwest. The lines meet in a large Y junction, the former straight-line route across the CPR lines no longer evident. The rails continue south of the CPR, serving a large quarry about 1 km south of the lines on Beach Road, and then continuing another 5 km south to Oxford Station where they feed a highway maintenance depot.

The section from Chaudière Junction to Hurdman was previously used by both CPR's Sussex Sub, and CNR's Beachburg Sub ran beside it. The Beachburg Sub rails are still used, connecting to the Chaudière line at a new junction. A spur from the original alignment of the Chaudière Junction was used for a short time, but was pulled up some time between 1991 and 1999. The Beachburg Sub leads to the Ottawa Train Station, which took over passenger services for Ottawa in 1966. Leading east from this point is the Montreal & Ottawa Railway, now CPR's M&O Subdivision. Just south of the original Chaudière Junction is a new wye that leads to Walkley Yard, a new freight switching yard.

=== Historic Plaque ===
Here is the text of a plaque erected in the town of Prescott, as it read in 2004: "This company, incorporated in 1850, built a railway from Prescott to Bytown (Ottawa) for the shipment of lumber and farm products to the markets of the northeastern United States and Montreal. Substantial funds were raised at Bytown, Prescott and other municipalities along the line. In 1851, Walter Shanly, Chief Engineer, started construction, and a train first ran from Prescott to Bytown on Christmas Day, 1854. The railway, renamed the Ottawa and Prescott in 1855, was the first to serve the nation's future capital, giving it access at Prescott to the St. Lawrence River and the Grand Trunk Railway. In 1867, it became the St. Lawrence and Ottawa Railway and in 1884 was leased to the Canadian Pacific Railway for 999 years."

== Officers And Directors ==
Officers And Directors Of The Bytown And Prescott Railway Company, 1851:

- President: John McKinnon
- Vice-president: Alfred Hooker
- Secretary: Robert Bell
- Treasurer at Bytown: Edward Masse
- Treasurer at Prescott: C. H. Peck
- Directors:
  - Joseph Aumond
  - John Egan
  - Charles Sparrow
  - N. Sparks
  - Wm. Patrick
  - John Moran
  - D. McLachlin
  - Joseph Bower
  - J. S. Archibald
  - Alpheus Jones
  - Wm. Creighton

Office: Aumond's building, Bytown.

== See also ==
- New York and Ottawa Railway
- List of Ontario railways
- List of defunct Canadian railways
