= John Bower Lewis =

Canadian politician

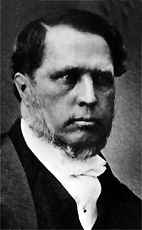
- John Bower Lewis

2nd Mayor of Bytown
- In office 1848–1849
- Preceded by: John Scott
- Succeeded by: Robert Hervey

1st Mayor of Ottawa
- In office 1855–1857
- Preceded by: Henry J. Friel
- Succeeded by: Edward McGillivray

Personal details
- Born: March 18, 1817 Paris, France
- Died: January 24, 1874 (aged 56) Ottawa
- Party: Conservative Party of Canada
- Spouse(s): Anna Eccles (1840); Helen Street (1843); Elizabeth Susan Wilson (1856)

John Bower Lewis, QC (March 18, 1817 – January 24, 1874) was the second mayor of Bytown in 1848, the first mayor of Ottawa from 1855 to 1857, and a member of the 2nd Canadian Parliament from 1872 to 1873.

He was born in Paris, France in 1817 and came to Canada with his family in 1820. He studied law in Toronto, was admitted to the bar in 1839, and became a Queen's Counsel in 1867.

He was elected to the first council for Bytown in 1847 and became mayor in 1848. After Bytown was renamed to Ottawa in 1854, he became its first mayor. He was police commissioner for the city in 1863. In 1872, he was elected to the House of Commons as a Conservative in the two-member riding of Ottawa City but resigned in 1873 due to the Pacific Scandal.

He died in Ottawa in 1874; he was the city solicitor and was also campaigning for reelection to the House of Commons at the time of his death.

== Archives ==
There is a John Bower Lewis and family fonds at Library and Archives Canada. Archival reference number is R5348.
