= John Scott (Canadian politician) =

1st mayor of Ottawa

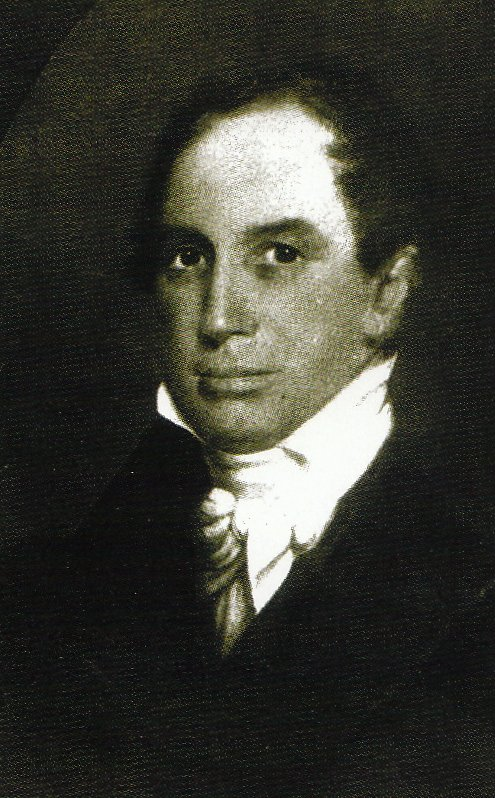

Mayor of Bytown
- In office 1847–1847
- Succeeded by: John Bower Lewis
- In office 1850–1850
- Preceded by: Robert Hervey
- Succeeded by: Charles Sparrow

Personal details
- Born: 1822 Brockville , Upper Canada
- Died: May 1, 1857 (aged 34–35) New York City, New York, United States
- Spouse: Nancy Louisa Wright

John Scott (1822 – May 1, 1857) was the first mayor of Bytown, later Ottawa, Canada West in 1847. He also served a second term as mayor in 1850. He concurrently served in the Legislative Assembly of the Province of Canada representing Bytown from 1848 to 1851.

He was born in Brockville, Upper Canada in 1822. He studied law in Toronto, Upper Canada and was called to the bar in the early 1840s. He came to Bytown to practice law in 1845.

Scott stood for Bytown council in the 1847 Bytown municipal election in South Ward. He tied with 92 votes with Thomas Corcoran. On September 18, after the council election, the members voted for a mayor from among their ranks. The Tory councillors from Upper Town supported John Bower Lewis, and the Reform councillors from Lower Town supported John Scott. As Lower Town had four members to Upper Town's three, Scott was elected mayor.

Scott married Nancy Louisa Wright (1830–1901), daughter of Tiberius Wright and Lois Ricker and a granddaughter of Philemon Wright, in 1850. By the 1850s, Scott moved to Goderich, Canada West, where he served as county judge. He died in New York City and was buried in Hull, Quebec.

Preceded by None	Mayor of Bytown; 1847	Succeeded by John Bower Lewis
Preceded by Robert Hervey	Mayor of Bytown; 1850	Succeeded by Charles Sparrow
