= Nicholas Sparks (politician) =

Canadian landowner (1794–1862)

Nicholas Sparks (1794–27 February 1862) was an early landholder of Bytown, Upper Canada who owned most of the lands in the present day commercial core of Downtown Ottawa.

== Biography ==
Sparks was born in Darrah parish, County Wexford in Ireland and came to Canada in 1816. He was recruited by Ruggles Wright (or by other accounts Ruggles's brother Philemon Jr.) at age twenty-four to voyage to Canada as a labourer in the Wright family's logging and farming enterprises in the location of modern Gatineau. By 1819 he was traveling to Montreal and Quebec, purchasing supplies for Wright.

On 25 September 1823, after saving his salary for several years, Sparks purchased 200 acres (0.8 km^{2}) of land - along with some food and chattels - on the south side of the Ottawa River. He purchased the lot from John Burrows Honey (later known as John Burrows), a surveyor. The land was lot C, concession C, Nepean Township, which covered much of what is today downtown Ottawa stretching from what is today Wellington Street in the north to Laurier Avenue in the south. It stretched west to modern Bronson Avenue and extended eastwards further than the Rideau Canal (to Waller) into what is today Sandy Hill. South of his land was the land of Colonel By. Sparks borrowed £95, to complete the transaction for land that today is in the central business core of Ottawa.

Historian Michael S. Cross wrote:

Lot C would become Sparks's life, the basis of his fortune and status. Defending his right to the property would preoccupy him for much of his career. Sparks's difficulties over the lot began immediately. Burrows Honey, it appears, had sold land he did not own. Although the original sale took place on 25 Sept. 1821, Burrows Honey did not receive clear title until 1823 for the south half and 1824 for the north half. The sale to Sparks, therefore, was not recorded at the county registry office until 20 June 1824. The confusion, which has led to considerable controversy among local historians over the purchase date, did not end there. Burrows Honey's title remained in doubt. As a result, Sparks repurchased the south 100 acres on 20 June 1826. Still there were doubts; Sparks made token payments of 5s. to John Burrows Honey and to his wife for title to the full 200 acres on 6 May and 10 July 1830 respectively. Out of this tangle it appears the famous purchase was not made on the usually accepted date of 20 June 1826 but rather nearly five years earlier on 25 Sept. 1821, although the legal technicalities were not resolved until 1830.

The 1826 date, however, has a fine touch of drama about it. Late in 1826 the decision was made to build the Rideau Canal through lot C. As the village of Bytown (Ottawa) sprang up around the canal terminus, Sparks became landlord for a whole community. Those months also saw Sparks cement the other foundation of his fortune. On 2 Nov. 1826 a marriage license was issued to Sparks and Sally Olmstead, widow of Philemon Wright Jr. The marriage solidified Sparks's link with the leadership of the Ottawa timber trade.

It was in land that Sparks reaped the greatest dividends. He began to sell portions of lot C as early as 18 Dec. 1826 when he sold land west of the canal mouth for £200 an acre, the same land he had bought for 9s. 6d. an acre. Land sales and leases quickly made Sparks wealthy. As one of the few people with ready cash he also became Bytown's leading moneylender and often enough was able to regain land he had sold. For example, in January 1832 he accepted a lot in payment of a debt of £75. In May 1832 Sparks sold an adjacent lot for £600. The nicest irony in all of Sparks's complex dealings came in July 1844 when he leased part of a town lot, 66 ft by 99 ft, for £200 to John Burrows.

The building of the final section of the canal saw the government expropriate the eastern section of his land, taking everything east of modern Elgin Street (then known as Biddy's Lane). While losing some of his land, this proved a benefit for Sparks as the location of the canal greatly increased the value of his other holdings. Sparks donated about 20 acres of land towards the canal's construction.

Sparks also donated land for civic buildings. He donated land for St. Andrew's Presbyterian Church, and for a new court house and fire station. When his West Ward Market, unable to compete with Lower Town's Byward Market, failed he donated the building to become Bytown's first city hall. In 1832, he donated some land at the northwest corner of his property to the Anglican Church and that is still the site of Ottawa's Christ Church Cathedral.

Sparks set out to encourage the establishment of commercial ventures on his property, which had proven to be poor farmland. Thus he established a market. While Ottawa remained a small town and commerce centered somewhat to the north of Sparks's holdings he became wealthy as a result of his land; further enhanced after 1857, with the selection of Ottawa as the capital of Province of Canada.

In 1827, the government had seized some of Sparks's holdings intending to construct a fortress to defend the new canal. Sparks challenged this appropriation of the land, between Bank Street and the Canal, which lay unused for years. He succeeded and was awarded a fortune of 27,000 pounds for the land. With this money he invested in enterprises across the region, and became a financier in the town. The Rideau Canal Act of February 1827, by the Legislative Assembly of Upper Canada expropriated 104 acres (42 ha) of Nicholas Sparks's land, not returned to him until 1847 or late 1849.

Around 1848, he had a street created through the center of his holdings; this would later be known as Sparks Street, one of Ottawa's central commercial areas.

In 1847, he became a member of Bytown's first town council. When the new city of Ottawa was created to replace Bytown in 1855, Sparks also served on its council until 1860.

Sparks's descendants continued to be prominent citizens in Ottawa for many generations, for example Percy Sparks spearheaded the creation of Gatineau Park. Today there are many Sparks still living in Ottawa.

== See also ==
- History of Ottawa
- Sparks Street
- Christ Church Cathedral (Ottawa)
