= Charles Sparrow =

Canadian politician (1808–1897)

Mayor of Bytown
- In office 1851–1851
- Preceded by: John Scott
- Succeeded by: Richard William Scott

Personal details
- Born: 1808 Quebec, Quebec
- Died: January 26, 1897 (aged 87) Ottawa, Ontario

Charles Sparrow (1808 – January 26, 1897) was the fifth mayor of Bytown.

He was born in Quebec in 1808 and moved to Bytown while still young. Sparrow owned a general store and tannery on Sussex Street in the Lower Town part of Bytown. He was elected to municipal council in 1850 and became mayor in 1851. He is buried at Notre-Dame Cemetery.

| Preceded by John Scott | Mayor of Bytown; 1851 | Succeeded by Richard William Scott |
