= Edward McGillivray =

Canadian politician

Edward McGillivray (September 15, 1815 – November 24, 1885) was the second mayor of Ottawa, Ontario, Canada from 1858 to 1859.

He was born in Glengarry County in 1815, and moved to Bytown at the age 20. He opened a general store there in 1836 and was involved in the fur trade. He was an alderman on the first city council for Ottawa in 1855.

He was president of the Bytown Telegraph Company and one of the founders of the Bytown and Prescott Railway. In 1882, he became president of J.R. Booth's Canada Atlantic Railway.

He died in 1885, aged 70, and was buried in the Beechwood Cemetery.
