= Stony Monday Riot =

Riot in former Bytown, Ontario in 1849

The Stony Monday Riot took place in Bytown (now Ottawa), Ontario on Monday, September 17, 1849. Lord Elgin, governor-general of the Province of Canada, wanted to inspect Bytown as a permanent site for the capital following the burning of the Parliament Buildings in Montreal. Tories opposed the proposed visit; Reformers wanted to honor his arrival. A violent confrontation occurred, wounding 30 and killing one. Lord Elgin eventually did choose Bytown for capital, and Bytown was renamed Ottawa.

In 1849 the peregrinating Canadian Parliament was located at Montreal. The Rebellion Losses Bill passed in the House of Assembly by 47 to 18; there was a majority not only amongst the British members of Lower Canada but also in Upper Canada. In spite of all protests, Lord Elgin, then Governor-General had signed the bill, compensating Lower Canadians for losses suffered during the Rebellions of 1837-38 in April 1849.

The bill was unpopular with Loyalists, known as Tories because it compensated those who had participated in the rebellion unless they had been convicted of treason. In the riots that ensued in Montreal, then the capital of Canada, Lord Elgin was assaulted and the Parliament Buildings were burned.

Lord Elgin let it be known that he was considering relocating the nation's capital and scheduled a visit to Bytown. Tory supporters, including the mayor Robert Hervey, opposed organizing a reception for Lord Elgin. At a meeting to plan for the visit organized by Reformists in the North Ward Market, now the Byward Market area, the two opposing sides clashed, first with sticks and stones, but later with firearms. 30 people were wounded and one man, David Borthwick, was shot and died.

Two days later, the two political factions, armed with cannons, muskets and pistols faced off on the Sappers Bridge over the Rideau Canal, but the military arrived in time to defuse the situation.

Lord Elgin delayed his visit until July 1853 and received a warm reception. Bytown, renamed Ottawa in 1855, became the capital of Canada in 1867.

== See also ==
- List of incidents of civil unrest in Canada
- Rebellion Losses Bill
- 1849 in Canada
