= Bytown =

Former name of Ottawa, Canada's capital city

Coordinates: 45.42451°N 75.694817°W

Bytown is the former name of Ottawa, Ontario, Canada. It was founded on September 26, 1826, incorporated as a town on January 1, 1850, and superseded by the incorporation of the City of Ottawa on January 1, 1855. The founding was marked by a sod turning, and a letter from Governor General Dalhousie which authorized Lieutenant Colonel John By to divide up the town into lots. Bytown came about as a result of the construction of the Rideau Canal and grew largely due to the Ottawa River timber trade. Bytown's first mayor was John Scott, elected in 1847.

== Overview ==
Bytown was located where the Rideau Canal meets the Ottawa River and consisted of two parts centred around the canal, Upper Town and Lower Town. Upper Town, situated to the west of the canal, was situated in the area of the current downtown and Parliament Hill. Lower Town was on the east side of the canal where today's Byward Market and general area of Lower Town still exists. The two areas of town were connected over the Rideau Canal by the Sappers Bridge, constructed in 1827.

The town took its name from John By who, as a lieutenant colonel in the British Royal Engineers, was instrumental in the construction of the canal. The name "Bytown" came about, somewhat as a "jocular reference" during a small dinner party of some officers, and it appears on official correspondence dated 1828.

Bytown Plan, 1842 1. Parliament Hill then called Barracks Hill 2. Wellington Street 3. Lyon St. (Previously, Sally St.)4. Kent St. 6. Sparks Street. 7. Barracks' Hill Cemetery. Rideau Canal is on the top right. Vittoria St. ran east-west between Lyon & Kent. Wellington St. was incomplete; a path curved around the hill, leading to Sappers Bridge over the canal.

Joseph Bouchette in the summer of 1828 wrote:

The streets are laid out with much regularity, and of a liberal width that will hereafter contribute to the convenience, salubrity and elegance of the place. The number of houses now built is about 150, most of which are constructed of wood; frequently in a style of neatness and taste that reflects great credit upon the Inhabitants. On the elevated banks of the Bay, the Hospital, an extensive stone building, and three Barracks stand conspicuous; nearly on a level with them, and on the eastern side of the Bay, is the residence of Colonel By, Command Royal Engineer at that Station.

Colonel By laid out the streets of Bytown, a pattern that mostly exists today. Wellington Street, Rideau Street, Sussex and Sparks Street were some of the earliest streets in use. Sappers Bridge actually connected Sparks Street to Rideau Street at that time. Nicholas Sparks owned Bytown's land west of the canal, except for the lands north of Wellington, which were considered "Ordnance" lands. The area east of Bank Street to the canal was acquired by the military and not used for houses for around two decades, after which it was returned to him.

The Ottawa River timber trade spurred the growth of Bytown, and it saw an influx of immigrants, and later entrepreneurs hoping to profit from the squared timber that would be floated down the Ottawa River to Quebec. Bytown had seen some trouble in the early days, first with the Shiners' War in 1835 to 1845, and the Stony Monday Riot in 1849.

Some early buildings that still stand had been erected in Bytown. In 1826, Thomas McKay was contracted to build the commissariat building, now the Bytown Museum. McKay also built Rideau Hall (which has since been expanded), and parts of the Union Bridge connecting LeBreton Flats to Hull. Notre-Dame Cathedral Basilica was also built early on in the developing town. The University of Ottawa had its 1846 origins as a college, and it received its present location in 1856.

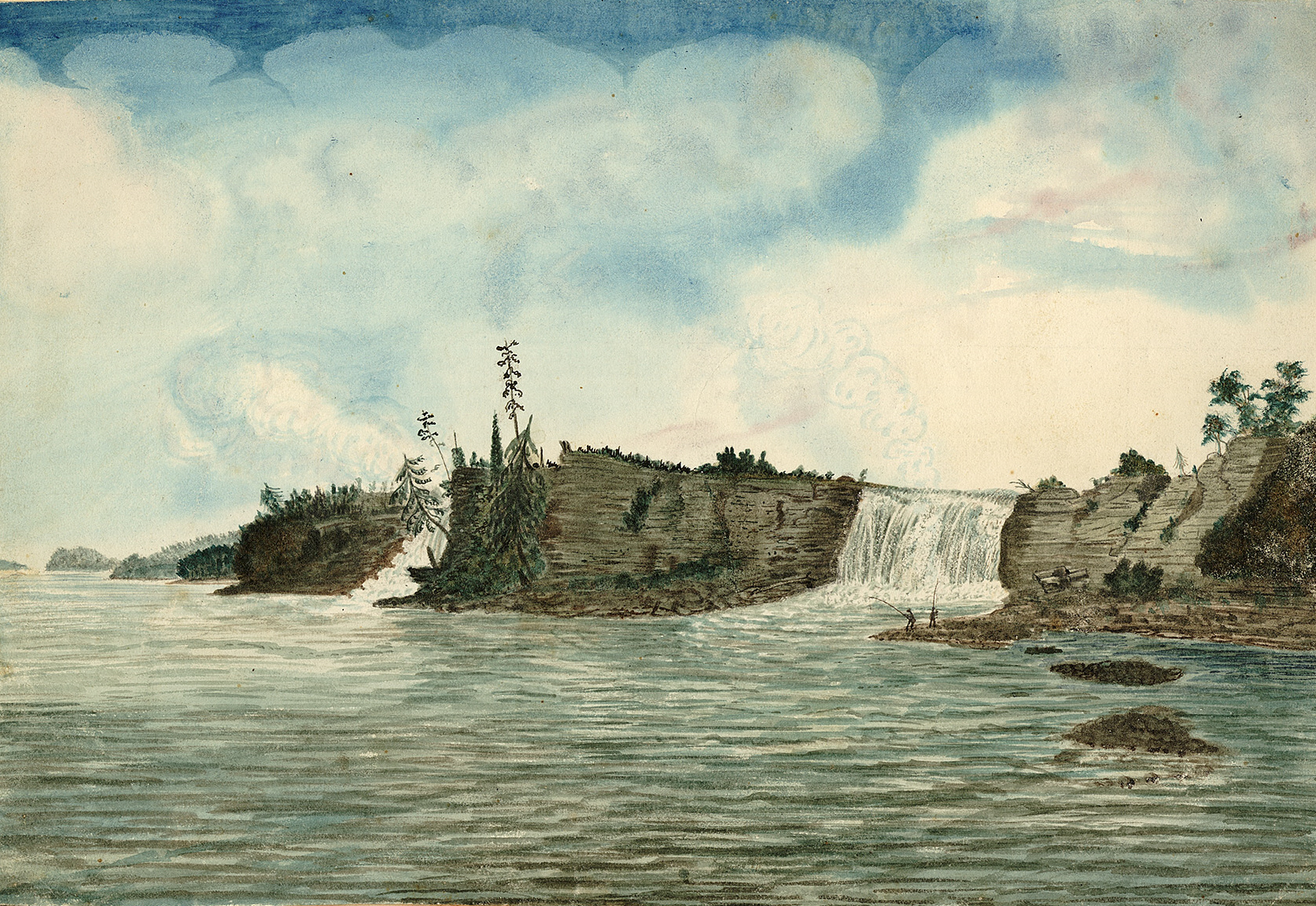
Falls of the Rideau River, at the Ottawa River, 1826 by Thomas Burrowes

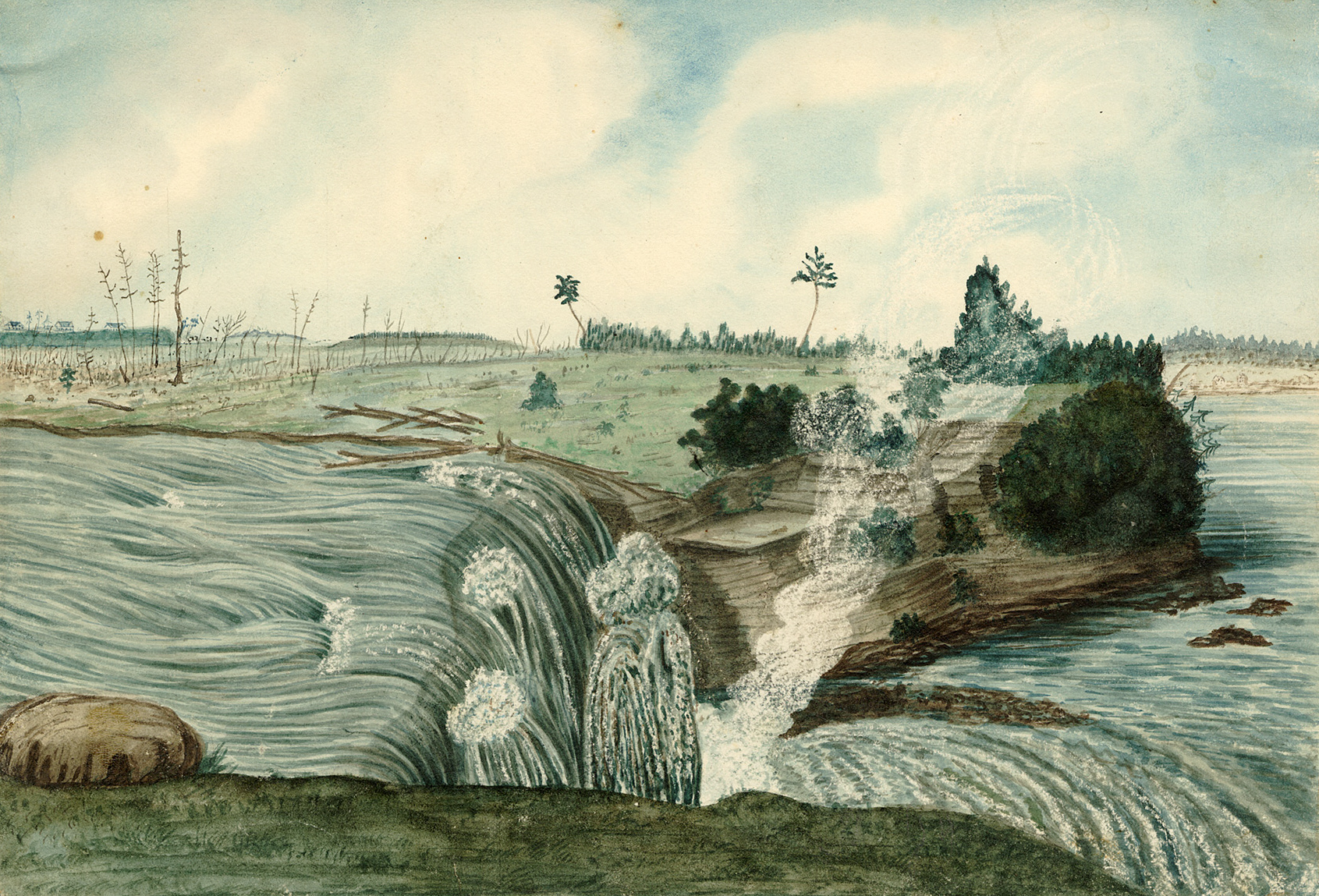
Western and Lesser Fall of the Rideau River; Barrack Hill and Upper Bytown in the left Distance, 1826 by Thomas Burrowes

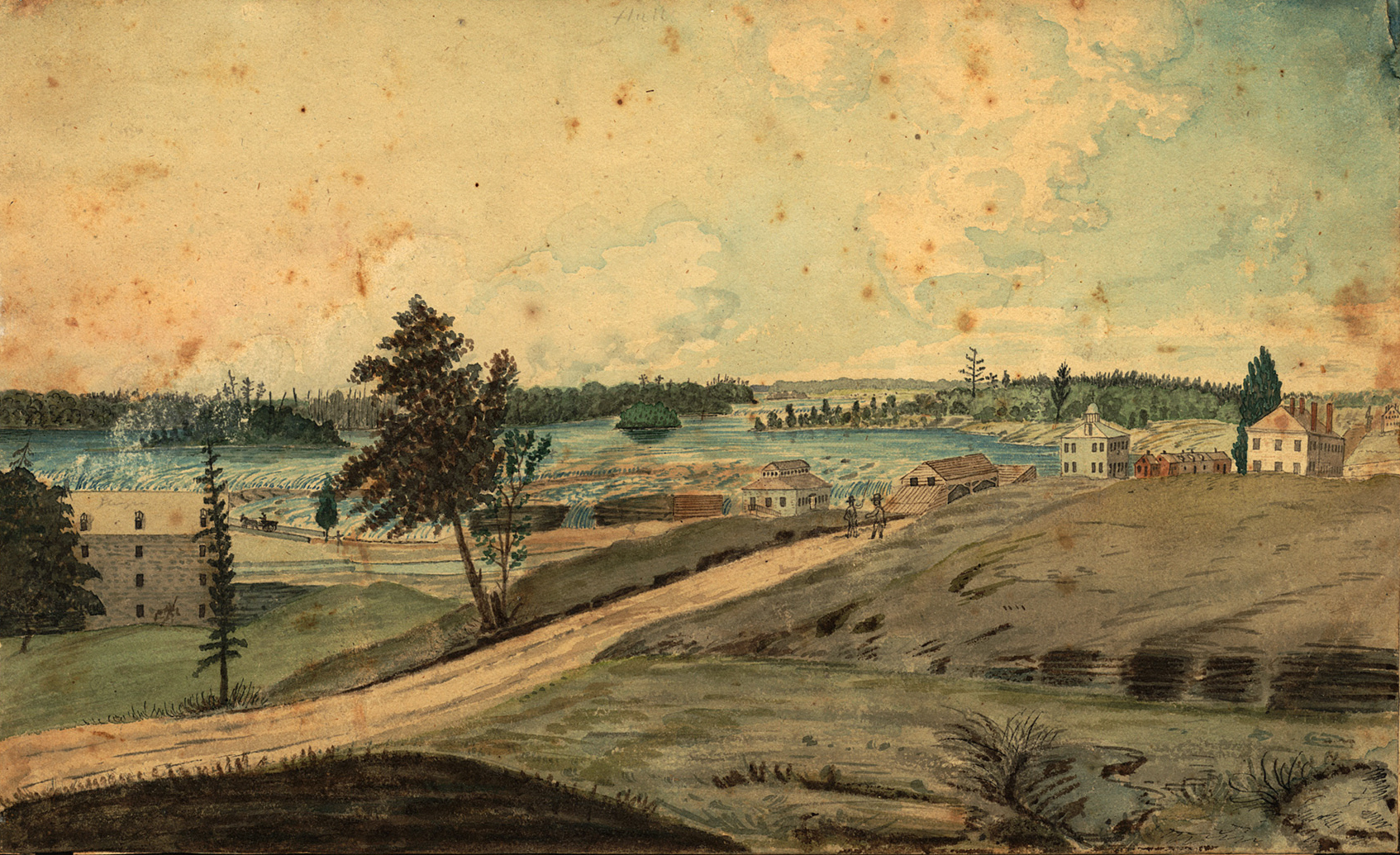
Hull, (Lower Canada), on the Ottawa River; at the Chaudière Falls, 1830 by Thomas Burrowes

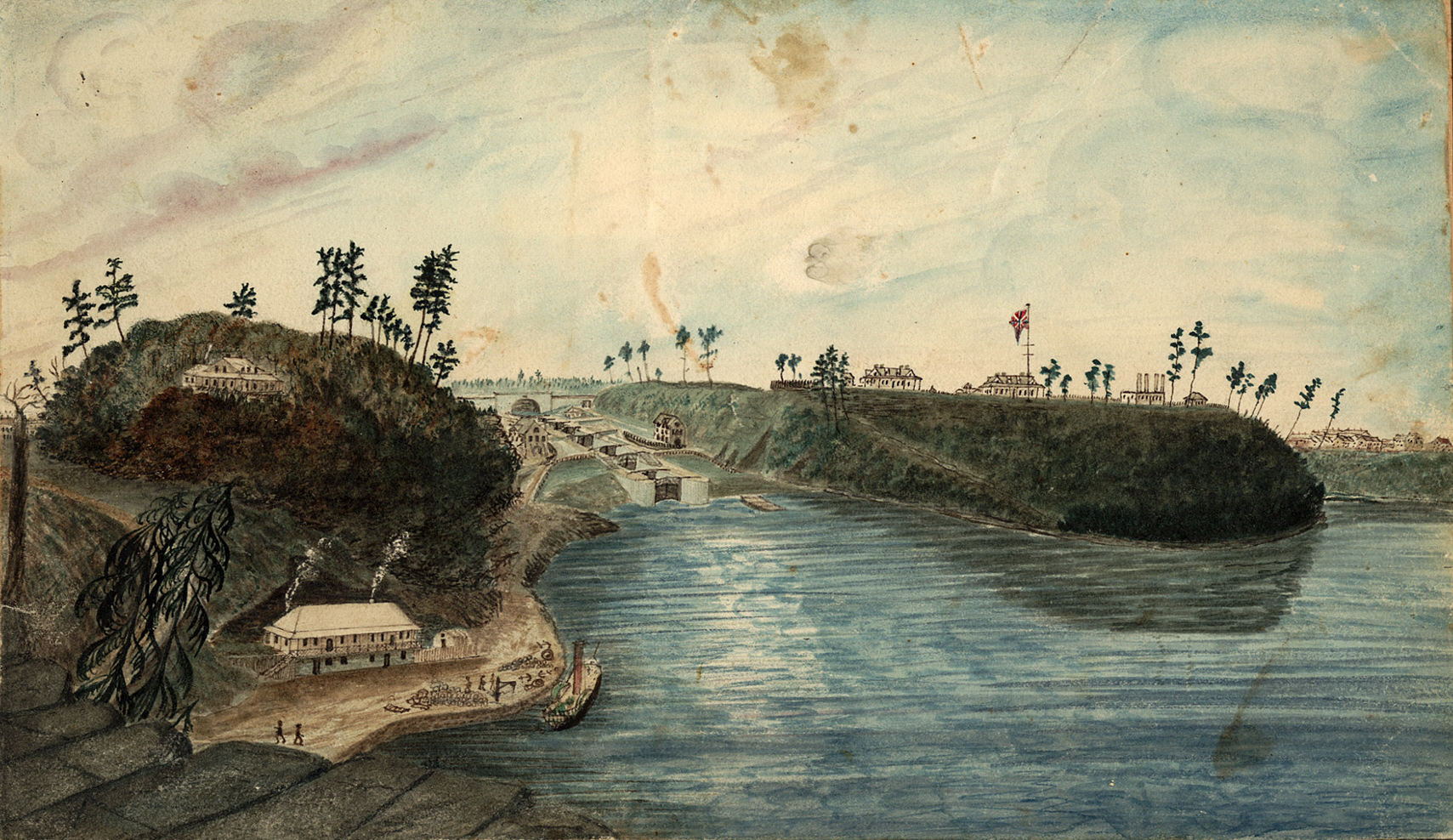
First Eight Locks of the Rideau Canal, the North entrance from the Ottawa River, 1834 by Thomas Burrowes

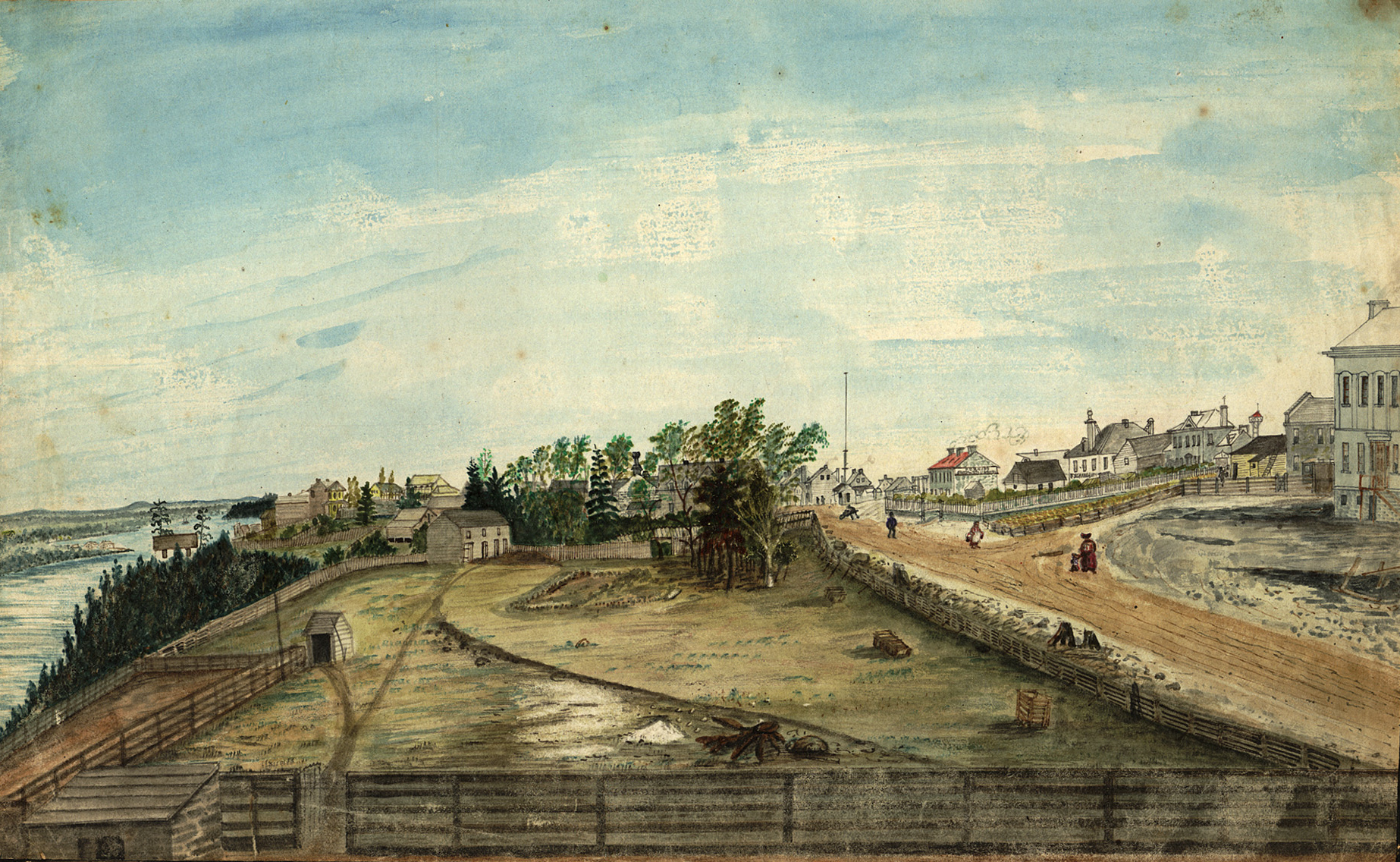
View at the West end of Wellington Street, Upper Bytown, looking east towards Lower Town in 1845 by Thomas Burrowes

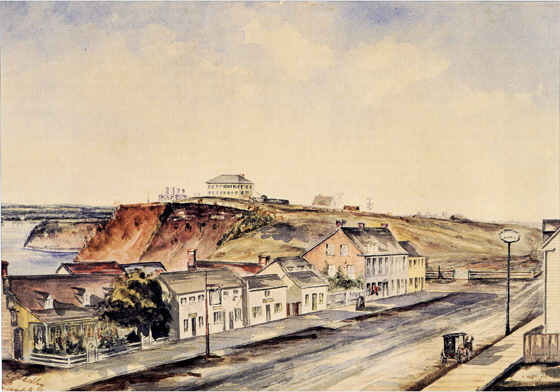
Bytown in 1853. Military Barracks on hill top was occupied by "A" Company of the Royal Canadian Rifle Regiment, presently home to Parliament Hill.

Though administration of Bytown had been conducted by civil authorities since 1828, the town did not become incorporated until much later. Various attempts at incorporation had been initiated since 1845. The Ordnance Department had held lands in the town's core (dividing Upper Town from Lower Town), lands which had been the property of Nicholas Sparks. These lands were considered by many to be blocking economic progress as well as being held for speculative reasons only. When Ordnance eventually returned the lands to Sparks through the Vesting Act, the major obstacle to incorporation was removed. Bytown was initially incorporated on July 28, 1847, and sanctioned by both the Legislative Assembly and the governor, but eventually this was disallowed by the Queen, possibly due to the perceived threat to Ordnance. An act of the Legislative Assembly further facilitated the incorporation of municipalities, and on January 1, 1850, Bytown was incorporated.

== Richmond Landing ==
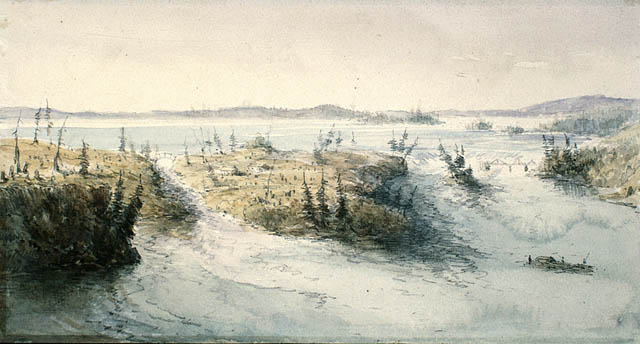
The Chaudière Falls and Chaudière Island in 1838 before damming.

Richmond Landing was a small settlement started in 1809 with Jehiel Collins' store, which preceded Bytown in present-day Ottawa. It was located just south of Victoria Island east of the present-day Portage Bridge in present-day Lebreton Flats. Wright's Town (Hull, Quebec), just across the Ottawa River, also near the Chaudière Falls, had already been founded by this time.

Collins built a log cabin and store on the south shore of the Ottawa River, near the Chaudière Falls area. Later the property was acquired by Caleb T. Bellows, an assistant in the store. Collins is credited as the first settler of what would become Bytown. By 1819, the little settlement at the landing got its first tavern operated by the Firths.

The settlement was named Bellows Landing until the fall of 1818, when a group of settlers responsible for the creation of a new road to Richmond, Ontario stayed there. The road became Richmond Road and Richmond Landing acquired its name. Sergeant Hill, had directed the creation of Richmond Road, Ottawa's first thoroughfare, a road which contained tree stumps, whose origin likely began at a portage trail bypassing the Chaudière Falls.

Richmond Landing was an area where those heading to and from Richmond could dock and receive correspondence and supplies from the outside world. A tavern constructed in 1819, whose existence had been shown since Bytown's earliest maps, was excavated prior to the construction of the Canadian War Museum whose east side currently covers it. Early maps also show the locations of buildings, and a Governmental store, constructed later. A building had been requested by early settlers to hold items that had previously been left near or on the dock by boats providing items for the settlements.

== Corktown ==
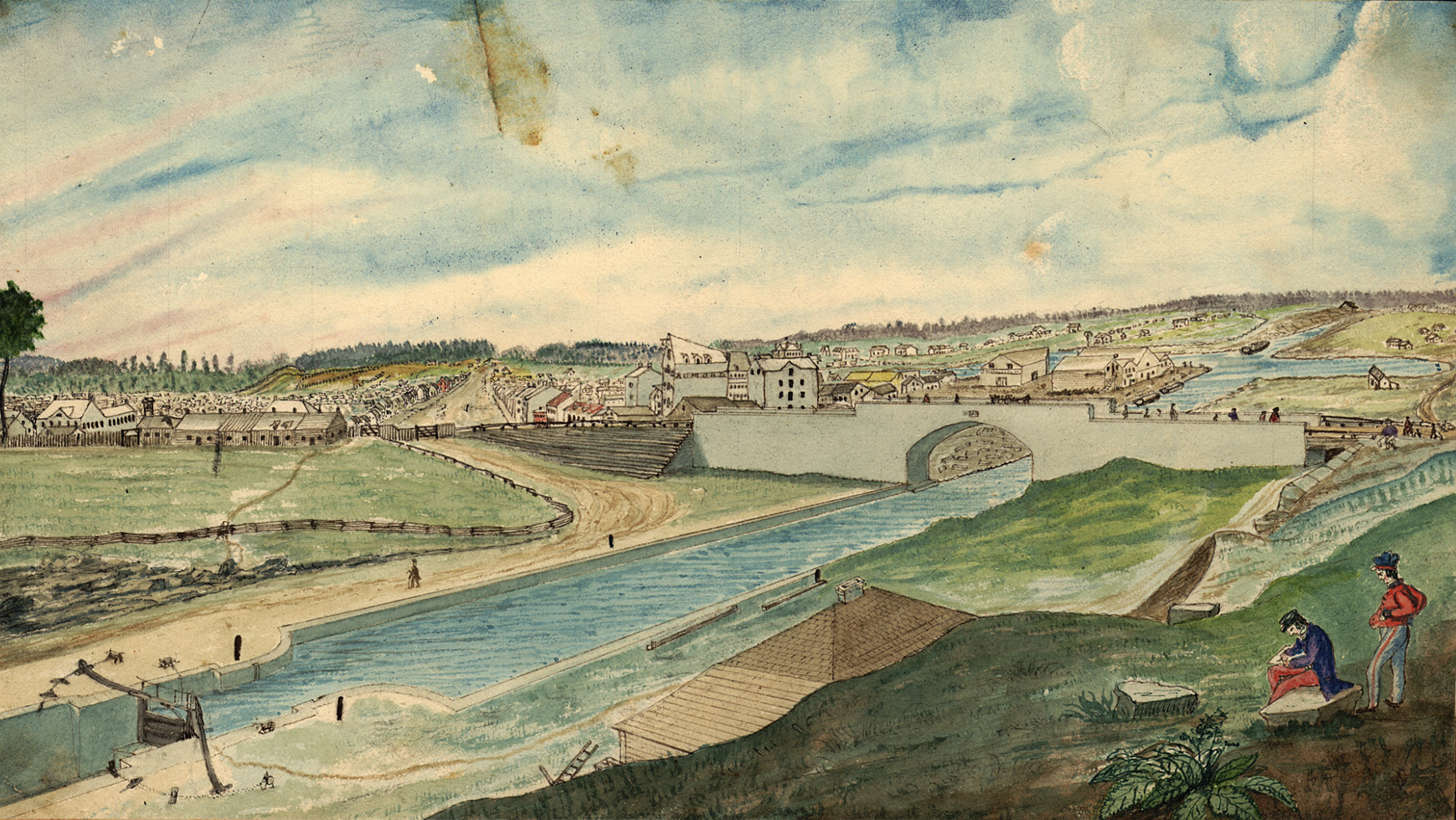
1845 painting of the Rideau Canal, Sappers Bridge, and Lower Town by Thomas Burrowes

Corktown, not a town at all, was a series of shanties along the "Deep Cut" section of the Rideau Canal in Ottawa which existed during its construction and were erected by some of its Irish labourers. Many of the workers came penniless from County Cork in Ireland, giving it its name. The settlement along both sides of the canal was allowed by Colonel By due to their desperate poverty and inability to pay rent. These men, separated from the others, had done some of the hard labour required of the canal's construction. They built turf or log shanties along the muddy bank, and possibly without sanction extended the settlement as far as through the Lower Town swamp and the banks of the Rideau River. Eventually, women and children moved to the area living among the approximately 150 houses built by 1829. Corktown disappeared shortly after the completion of the canal, which was under construction between 1826 and 1832.

== Legacy ==
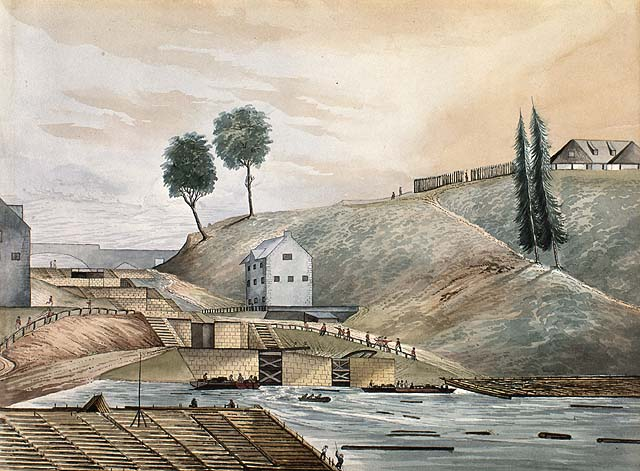
Today's Bytown Museum as seen in an 1839 painting of the Rideau Canal

- Bytown remains a nickname for Ottawa.
- There is a Bytown Museum in Ottawa in the oldest stone building in the city, built by Thomas McKay, containing artifacts dating back to the Bytown era.
- The name Bytown survives in the name of Bytownite, a calcium-rich plagioclase feldspar mineral, named from its occurrence near Ottawa.
- The ByTowne Cinema, one of Ottawa's oldest movie theatres, was originally named the Nelson Cinema, but later renamed to honour the city's original name.
- The Rideau Canal remains, a lot of it looks very much as it originally did, and it is a heritage site.
- The Corktown Footbridge was opened on September 21, 2006, in honour of the sacrifices made by the Irish settlers in constructing the Rideau Canal.
- Colonel By's house was located in Majors Hill Park; today a monument stands at its location. At the location, unmarked, are two large chunks of the Sappers Bridge.

== See also ==
- Bytown Mechanics' Institute
- History of Ottawa
- Ottawa River Timber Trade
