= 1978 Ottawa-Carleton Regional Municipality elections =

1978 Ottawa-Carleton Regional chair election
- Nov. 13, 1978 (popular vote); Dec. 13, 1978 (chair vote)
Nominee	Andy Haydon	Bill Tupper
Council vote	17	13
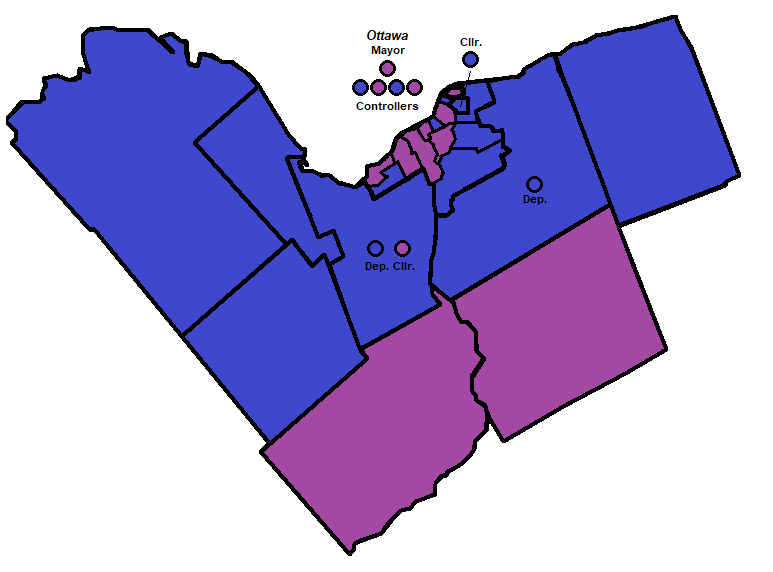
- Council vote for chair
Chair before election
Denis Coolican
Elected Chair
Andy Haydon

Municipal elections were held on November 13, 1978 in the Regional Municipality of Ottawa-Carleton (RMOC), Ontario, Canada. This page lists the election results for local mayors, reeves, councils and hydro commissions of the RMOC in 1978.

== Regional Chair of Ottawa-Carleton ==
Nepean mayor Andy Haydon was elected as Regional Chair, defeating Rideau Township reeve Bill Tupper, 17–13 among elected regional councillors.

== Regional Council ==
The following were elected to regional council either directly on election day or by the local councils afterwards.

Position	Representing	Councillor	Chair vote
Chair	At-large	Andy Haydon	—
Councillor	Reeve of Cumberland	Henri Rocque	Haydon
Councillor	Reeve of Gloucester	Betty Stewart	Haydon
Councillor	Deputy reeve of Gloucester	Fred Barrett	Haydon
Councillor	Mayor of Goulbourn	Betty Hill	Haydon
Councillor	Mayor of Kanata	Marianne Wilkinson	Haydon
Councillor	Mayor of Nepean	Ben Franklin	Haydon
Councillor	Deputy mayor of Nepean	Al Loney	Haydon
Councillor	Nepean, Councillor	Margaret Rywak	Tupper
Councillor	Mayor of Osgoode	Al Bouwers	Tupper
Councillor	Mayor of Ottawa	Marion Dewar	Tupper
Councillor	Ottawa Controller	Brian Bourns	Tupper
Councillor	Ottawa Controller	Bill Law	Haydon
Councillor	Ottawa Controller	Don B. Reid	Haydon
Councillor	Ottawa Controller	Ralph Sutherland	Tupper
Councillor	Ottawa, Alderman (Alta Vista)	Don Kay	Haydon
Councillor	Ottawa, Alderman (Britannia)	Marlene Catterall	Tupper
Councillor	Ottawa, Alderman (By-St. George's)	Georges Bedard	Tupper
Councillor	Ottawa, Alderman (Capital)	Michele MacKinnon	Tupper
Councillor	Ottawa, Alderman (Carleton)	Toddy Kehoe	Haydon
Councillor	Ottawa, Alderman (Dalhousie)	Rolf Hasenack	Tupper
Councillor	Ottawa, Alderman (Elmdale-Victoria)	Chris Chilton	Tupper
Councillor	Ottawa, Alderman (Gloucester)	Joe Quinn	Haydon
Councillor	Ottawa, Alderman (Queensboro)	Trip Kennedy	Tupper
Councillor	Ottawa, Alderman (Rideau)	Rhéal Robert	Haydon
Councillor	Ottawa, Alderman (Wellington)	Joe Cassey	Haydon
Councillor	Mayor of Rideau	Dave Bartlett	Tupper
Councillor	Reeve of Rockcliffe Park	Beryl Plumptre	Tupper
Councillor	Mayor of Vanier	Bernard Grandmaître	Haydon
Councillor	Vanier, Councillor (chosen from council)	Marcel Chaput	Haydon
Councillor	Reeve of West Carleton	Frank Marchington	Haydon

== Cumberland ==
=== Reeve ===
Candidate	Vote	%
Henri Rocque	Acclaimed	

=== Council ===
Four to be elected

Candidate	Vote	%
Don Boudria	2,654	25.79
Frank Kenny	1,787	17.36
Paul MacDonnell	1,648	16.01
Ray Friel	1,486	14.44
Patricia Wright	1,444	14.03
Ray Danis	1,272	12.36

== Gloucester ==
=== Reeve ===
Candidate	Vote	%
Betty Stewart	6,045	51.50
Mitch Owens	5,694	48.50

=== Deputy reeve ===
Candidate	Vote	%
Fred G. Barrett	7,789	66.82
Doris Schackleton	3,868	33.18

=== Council ===
(Five to be elected)

Candidate	Vote	%
Harry Allen	6,831	14.17
Eugène Bellemare (X)	6,061	12.57
William Hunter	4.868	10.10
Mary A. Bryden	4,615	9.57
Harold G. Keenan	4,096	8.50
Jim Arnold	3,798	7.88
Vincent Barsona	3,570	7.41
Andre Ladouceur	3,337	6.92
Andre Sarault	3,005	6.23
David Duncan	2,852	5.92
Charles Dolan	1,989	4.13
Leona Davignon	1,858	3.85
Neil Lewer	1,31	2.74

=== Hydro commission ===
(Two to be elected)

Candidate	Vote	%
Robert Basallion	Acclaimed	
A. J. Bowker	Acclaimed	

== Goulbourn ==
=== Mayor ===
Candidate	Vote	%
Betty Hill (X)	2,486	60.11
Fred H. A. Campbell	1,650	39.89

=== Council ===
Candidate	Vote	%
Ward 1
Gilmour Brown	538	69.33
M. J. Fergus	126	16.24
McGill Aboud	112	14.43
Ward 2
Bob Fredericks	351	35.93
Roger Griffiths (X)	288	29.48
Jim Whiteside	217	22.21
Bud Haw	121	12.38
Ward 3
J. Don Green	703	57.81
Cy Warner (X)	513	42.19
Ward 4
Anton Wytenburg	612	54.50
Nancy Laws	511	45.50

== Kanata ==
=== Referendum ===
This was the first municipal election in Kanata's history, which amalgamated March Township with parts of Nepean and Goulbourn. As the city had yet to be named, voters voted in a referendum to choose the new city's name. Kanata was the choice of a plurality of voters, thanks to winning the support of voters in March Township.

Choice	Vote	%
Kanata	3,094	39.73
Hazeldean	2,964	38.06
March	1,162	14.92
Kairnwood	568	7.29

=== Mayor ===
Candidate	Vote	%
Marianne Wilkinson	3,599	46.24
Ihor Nakonecznyj	2,811	36.12
Pat Carroll	1,373	17.64

=== Council ===
Candidate	Vote	%
Ward 1 (rural March)
Carroll Foley	Acclaimed	
Ward 2 (Kanata)
Bob Kingham	910	65.28
Maurice Dubras	484	34.72
Ward 3 (Kanata)
Bill Lund	781	54.54
Chris Robinson	651	45.46
Ward 4 (Katimavik)
Doug Nash	452	42.88
John Perchall	359	34.06
Doug Foster	201	19.07
J. Harold Moore	42	3.98
Ward 5 (Glen Cairn-Hazeldean)
Charles Rogers	887	50.74
Bob Cunningham	861	49.26
Ward 6 (Glen Cairn-Bridlewood)
Jean Gabby	732	50.27
G. R. Godin	724	49.73

== Nepean ==
=== Reeve ===
Candidate	Vote	%
Ben Franklin	10,426	51.17
Bob Mitchell	9,950	48.83

=== Deputy Reeve ===
Candidate	Vote	%
Al Loney	10,403	52.31
Bob Kimmerly	4,195	21.10
J. Kenneth Kerr	3,184	16.01
Victoria Mason	2,104	10.586

=== Council ===
(Five to be elected)

Candidate	Vote	%
Margaret Ellen Rywak (X)	10,626	13.03
Ed Puccini (X)	9,869	12.10
Al Brown	9,419	11.55
Beryl Gaffney	8,320	10.20
Hugh McDonald	8,106	9.94
Frank Reid	7,528	9.23
Paul Charlebois	5,826	7.15
Ray Smith	5,063	6.21
Hank Van Der Horn	4,260	5.22
Terrence Bell	4,254	5.22
Reba Kingston	3,760	4.61
Harry Splett	3,492	4.28
Albert W. Jeans	1,010	1.24

=== Hydro commission ===
(Four to be elected)

Candidate	Vote	%
Martin J. Montague (X)	10,784	18.20
Wayne Phillips (X)	9,925	16.75
Edward R. Lauer	6,794	11.47
Mervyn Sullivan (X)	6,656	11.24
Steve Shore	5,959	10.06
Tom Dewar	5,946	10.04
John Wentzell	4,688	7.91
Lawrence J. Craig	4,418	7.46
A. Bruce Burton	4,071	6.87

== Osgoode ==
=== Reeve ===
Candidate	Vote	%
Albert Bouwers (X)	Acclaimed	

=== Council ===
Four to be elected

Candidate	Vote	%
Mary Cooper (X)	1,500	18.90
Albert McKeown (X)	1,414	17.82
Fred Alexander (X)	1,322	16.66
Philip McEvoy (X)	1,192	15.02
Doug Thompson	1,112	14.01
Paul Coulson	852	10.74
Brent Reid	544	6.85

== Ottawa ==
=== Mayor ===
Candidate	Vote	%
Marion Dewar	51,791	54.24
Pat Nicol	32,033	33.55
Bernard Pelot	8,439	8.84
Alphonse Frederick Lapointe	1,858	1.95
Eddie Turgeon	730	0.76
Ian Orenstein	597	0.63

== Rideau ==
=== Mayor ===
Candidate	Vote	%
David Bartlett	2,207	57.16
Glenn Brooks	1,654	42.84

=== Council ===
Two to be elected from each ward

Candidate	Vote	%
Ward 1
Bill Schouten	846	38.06
Don Ayres	649	29.19
Jack Pratt	433	19.48
Frank Ritskes	295	13.27
Ward 2
Joyce Bigley	626	29.16
John B. Wilson (X)	562	26.18
Alton Good (X)	525	24.45
Ward 3
Richard McDonald (X)	1,041	50.17
Dorothy Bickerton	781	37.64
Bruce Kent	253	12.19

== Rockcliffe Park ==
=== Referendum ===
Voters were asked if they were in favour of licensed liquor premises in the village, which would make the village "wet".

Choice	Vote	%
Yes	744	76.15
No	233	23.85

=== Reeve ===
Candidate	Vote	%
Beryl A. Plumptre (X)	526	51.07
Ronald Clark	504	48.93

=== Council ===
Four to be elected

Candidate	Vote	%
Peter Newcombe (X)	770	21.28
Sandy Watson	685	18.93
Patrick Murray	683	18.88
John M. Coyne	623	17.22
Gordon Shearly (X)	445	12.30
J. Duncan Edmonds	412	11.39

== Vanier ==
=== Mayor ===
Candidate	Vote	%
Bernard Grandmaître (X)	Acclaimed	

=== Council ===
Two elected from each ward

Candidate	Vote	%
Ward 1
Paul St. George (X)	503	34.62
Bunny McCann	413	28.42
Marcel Champagne	327	22.51
Joseph Gariepy	132	9.08
Paul Tomaro	78	5.37
Ward 2
Marcel Chaput (X)	1,321	52.15
Ronald Killeen (X)	891	35.18
Yvette Bigras	321	12.67
Ward 3
Wilfred Champagne	710	33.22
Robert Madore (X)	677	31.68
Gilles Barbary (X)	586	27.42
Gerard Gagne	164	7.67
Ward 4; 2 to be elected
Guy Cousineau (X)	Acclaimed	
Florian Gauthier (X)	Acclaimed	

== West Carleton ==
=== Mayor ===
Candidate	Vote	%
Frank Marchington	2,554	55.08
Donald Munro	2,083	44.92

=== Council ===
Two to be elected from each ward

Candidate	Vote	%
Torbolton Ward
Betty Smith		
Bill Edwards (X)		
Andrew Baldwin (X)		
Fitzroy Ward
Bert Reitsma (X)	Acclaimed	
Eric Greene (X)	Acclaimed	
Huntley Ward
Ivan Baird (X)	Acclaimed	
Gerald Belisle (X)	Acclaimed	
