= 1978 Ottawa municipal election =

Election in Ontario, Canada

1978 Ottawa mayoral election
- November 13, 1978
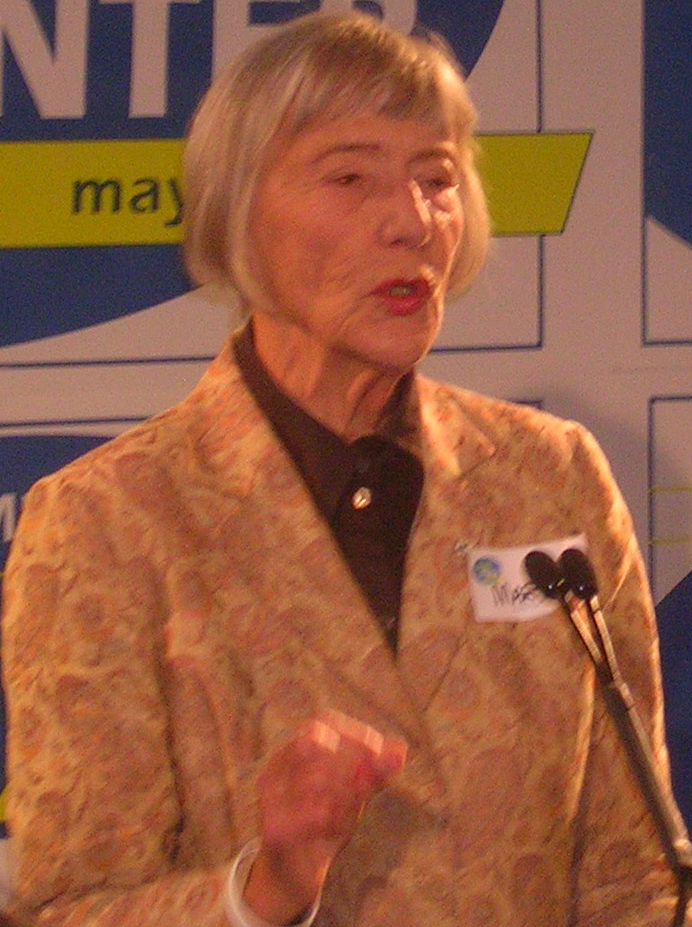
Candidate	Marion Dewar	Pat Nicol
Popular vote	51,791	32,033
Percentage	54.24%	33.55%
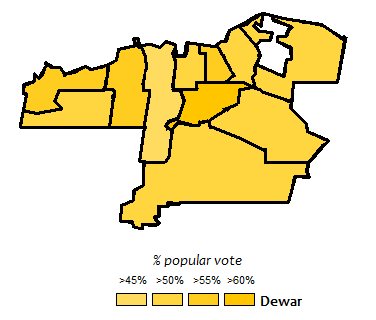
- Results by ward
Mayor before election
Lorry Greenberg
Elected mayor
Marion Dewar

The city of Ottawa, Canada held municipal elections on November 13, 1978.

Controller Marion Dewar became the second woman and first New Democratic Party (and to date, only) affiliated person to become mayor of Ottawa. She defeated former alderman Pat Nicol. This would mark the last elections for Ottawa's Board of Control.

== Mayor ==
Dewar won all of the city's 11 wards. Her strongest ward was Capital, where she won 62.8% of the vote. Her worst ward was Elmdale-Victoria, where she won 48.9%. Elmdale-Victoria was the only ward where she did not get a majority of the vote. Elmdale-Victoria was Nicol's home ward, but Dewar still beat her there by 545 votes.

Candidate	Votes	%
Marion Dewar	51,791	54.24
Pat Nicol	32,033	33.55
Bernard Pelot	8,439	8.84
Alphonse Frederick Lapointe	1,858	1.95
Eddie Turgeon	730	0.76
Ian Orenstein	597	0.63

== Ottawa Board of Control ==
(4 elected)

Candidate	Votes	%
Don Reid (X)	50,171	17.11
Brian Bourns	36,363	12.40
William Law	33,220	11.33
Ralph Sutherland (X)	29,716	10.13
Roy Bushfield	26,314	8.97
Gerry Trudel	24,382	8.31
Jules Morin	22,718	7.75
Doug Payne	18,464	6.30
David Dehler	11,245	3.83
Cyril Goulet	11,015	3.72
Richard Calagoure	10,912	3.72
Sam MacLean	8,994	3.07
Joseph Louis Paradis	7,476	2.55
George Theckeddath	2,251	0.77

== Ottawa City Council ==
Map of Ottawa's Wards used in this election: 1. Rideau Ward; 2. By-St. George's Ward; 3. Wellington Ward; 4. Capital Ward; 5. Dalhousie Ward; 6. Elmdale-Victoria Ward; 7. Queensboro Ward; 8. Britannia Ward; 9. Carleton Ward; 10. Alta Vista Ward; 11. Gloucester Ward.

Alta Vista Ward
Candidate	Votes	%
Don Kay (X)	5,749	48.85
Keith Martin	3,571	30.35
Darrel Kent	2,448	20.80

Gloucester Ward
Candidate	Votes	%
Joe Quinn (X)	4,429	38.72
Terry Denison	3,832	33.50
Gordon Lennox	3,177	27.78

Britannia Ward
Candidate	Votes	%
Marlene Catterall (X)	5,925	58.47
Sandy Boyce	4,209	41.53

Rideau Ward
Candidate	Votes	%
Rhéal Robert (X)	5,312	53.62
Bruce Grant	4,298	43.39
Ed Howard	296	2.99

Capital Ward
Candidate	Votes	%
Michele MacKinnon	4,107	45.76
Thom Bennett	2,661	29.65
Dave Hagerman	1,735	19.33
Doug Coupar	356	2.97
Michael John Houlton	116	1.29

Carleton Ward
Candidate	Votes	%
Toddy Kehoe (X)	5,935	69.68
Bill Bangs	2,582	30.32

Queensboro Ward
Candidate	Votes	%
Trip Kennedy (X)	5,758	69.47
Richard MacDonald	2,531	30.53

Dalhousie Ward
Candidate	Votes	%
Rolf Hasenack (X)	2,688	62.83
Phil Aston	648	15.15
Gary Larkin	543	12.69
John Campbell	399	9.33

Elmdale-Victoria Ward
Candidate	Votes	%
Chris Chilton	1,930	24.53
Roland Wall (X)	1,763	22.40
Byron Hyde	1,661	21.11
Richard Albert	1,296	16.47
Kathleen Tuskey	1,219	15.49

By-St. George's Ward
Candidate	Votes	%
Georges Bedard	4,035	51.00
Marcel Lauzon	3,112	39.33
Clotilde Berube	765	9.67

Wellington Ward
Candidate	Votes	%
Joe Cassey (X)	2,057	44.88
Brian Atkinson	1,545	33.71
Gary Beach	981	21.41

== Ottawa Board of Education Trustees ==
Six to be elected in each zone

Eastern Zone	Vote
Jane Dobell (X)	16,371
Don Francis (X)	13,239
Helen Slater (X)	10,743
Ted Best (X)	10,696
John Samuel (X)	8,803
Michael McKenna	8,491
Herbert Armstrong	8,019
Marion Atwell	7,764
Norman MacDonald	7,381
Marnie Bennett	6,700
Peg Mathews	6,421
Rosemary McNarin	6,015
Allan Simpson	5,543
Gary Hough	2,723
Terry Carlson	2,675

Western Zone	Vote
Robert Beatty (X)	14,064
Mary Gilmour (X)	13,948
Nick van Duyvendyk (X)	12,626
Sinclair Abell (X)	12,614
William Harback (X)	8,624
Sandra R. Goldstein	7,856
Wayne Wilson	7,810
John Wright	7,794
John Callan	6,816
Frank Edwards	6,506
Denis Cooney	5,261
Richard Bounsall	4,996
Cal Kempffer	4,839
John Gorry	3,996

4 to be elected

Separate school supporters	Vote
Jacques Beauchamp (X)	17,271
Robert Bélanger	16,873
Dalton McGuinty, Sr. (X)	16,244
Lucien Bradet (X)	15,140
Jacques Faucher (X)	12,850
Thomas F. Kent	11,407

1 to be elected

Vanier Trustee	Vote
Denise Matte	Acclaimed
