= 1974 Ottawa municipal election =

Election in Ontario, Canada

1974 Ottawa mayoral election
- December 2, 1974
Candidate	Lorry Greenberg	Tom McDougall
Popular vote	36,035	31,358
Percentage	50.00%	43.51%
- Results by ward
Mayor before election
Pierre Benoit
Elected mayor
Lorry Greenberg

The city of Ottawa, Canada held municipal elections on December 2, 1974. Controller Lorry Greenberg defeated fellow controller Tom McDougall. Greenberg became the first Jewish mayor of the city.

== Mayor of Ottawa ==
Both Greenberg and McDougall ran on similar platforms, but were divided on transit, which became the focal point of the campaign. McDougall supported rapid transit, while Greenberg preferred improved bus service, including exclusive busways and bus-only lanes. Greenberg ran on a vision of Ottawa as a "very special city", opposing rapid growth in the region.

Candidate	Votes	%
Lorry Greenberg	36,035	50.00
Tom McDougall	31,358	43.51
Stuart Langford	3,030	4.20
Alphonse Frederick Lapointe	1,642	2.28
Total valid votes	72,065	93.97
Blank and spoiled votes	4,622	6.03
Total votes	76,687	
Source: Ottawa Municipal Election: 1974 (Detailed Results)

=== Results by ward ===
Despite the close race, Greenberg won every ward in the city. He saw his strongest results in the west end, where he lived, and in Lower Town, where he grew up.

Ward	Greenberg	Langford	Lapointe	McDougall
Rideau (1)	3,569	289	298	3,157
By-St. George's (2)	3,246	319	452	2,304
Wellington (3)	2,106	275	79	1,887
Capital (4)	3,617	459	105	3,363
Dalhousie (5)	1,891	208	121	1,611
Elmdale-Victoria (6)	3,121	229	118	3,078
Queensboro (7)	3,409	249	111	2,912
Britannia (8)	3,388	221	83	2,652
Carleton (9)	3,802	224	71	2,959
Alta Vista (10)	4,173	274	112	3,848
Gloucester (11)	3,713	283	92	3,589

=== Candidates ===
- Lorry Greenberg, 40, former house builder, and co-founder of Minto Construction. Alderman for Wellington Ward (1968–1969); Controller (1970–1974); Deputy Mayor (1972–1974).
- Stuart Langford, 28, law student.
- Alphonse Lapointe, 51, businessman.
- Tom McDougall, 32, lawyer. Alderman for Rideau Ward (1970–1972); Controller (1972–1974).

== Ottawa Board of Control ==
(4 elected)

Candidate	Votes	%
Marion Dewar	37,574	
Don Reid	35,635	
Gary Guzzo	34,703	
Bill Law	24,888	
Joe Cassey	23,776	
Walter Ryan	21,772	
Gale Kerwin	21,212	
Byron Hyde	20,214	
Joseph Louis Paradis	5,617	

== City council ==
Map of Ottawa's Wards used in this election: 1. Rideau Ward; 2. By-St. George's Ward; 3. Wellington Ward; 4. Capital Ward; 5. Dalhousie Ward; 6. Elmdale-Victoria Ward; 7. Queensboro Ward; 8. Britannia Ward; 9. Carleton Ward; 10. Alta Vista Ward; 11. Gloucester Ward.

Alta Vista Ward
Candidate	Votes	%
Don Kay (X)	4,596	
Phil Graham	3,429	

Gloucester Ward
Candidate	Votes	%
Joe Quinn (X)	2,601	
Mary Mills	1,950	
Bill Havaris	1,744	
Bill Zlepnig	840	
Bill Mason	212	

Britannia Ward
Candidate	Votes	%
Sandy Boyce	2,412	
Diane Birch	2,203	
Maurice Royer	706	
Anthony Gray	536	

Rideau Ward
Candidate	Votes	%
Rhéal Robert (X)	3,878	
Roy Mayer	1,659	
Jim Steinhart	1,599	

Capital Ward
Candidate	Votes	%
Don Lockhart (X)	2,039	
Thom Bennett	1,389	
Lionel Britton	1,306	
Bill Kincaid	1,030	
Wendell Atchison	785	
Jim Wright	387	
Leo Morency	216	

Carleton Ward
Candidate	Votes	%
Toddy Kehoe	1,786	
Mike Moore	1,405	
Alison Bowick	1,289	
Syd Ford	788	
Ted Rickar	770	
Ken Read	604	

Queensboro Ward
Candidate	Votes	%
Trip Kennedy	2,343	
Richard Waddell	1,980	
Aline Akeson	1,156	
Brooke McNabb	906	

Dalhousie Ward
Candidate	Votes	%
Rolf Hasenack	1,105	
Garry Kerwin	994	
John Piazza	725	
Rudy Capogreco	543	
Pinky Mitchell	436	
Ron O'Connell	94	

Elmdale-Victoria Ward
Candidate	Votes	%
Pat Nicol	2,139	
Bruce Harvey	1,467	
Rolly Wall	1,306	
Keith Hearn	1,237	

By-St. George's Ward
Candidate	Votes	%
Georges Bedard	2,456	
Jules Morin (X)	1,938	
Gerard Levesque	1,292	
Sam McLean	446	

Wellington Ward
Candidate	Votes	%
Brian Bourns	1,917	
Matt McGrath	1,366	
Trudy Wiltshire	811	
Paul Macdonnell	124	
