= 1976 Ottawa municipal election =

Election in Ontario, Canada

1976 Ottawa mayoral election
- December 6, 1976
Candidate	Lorry Greenberg	Alphonse Frederick Lapointe	Bill Foster
Popular vote	49,788	3,482	3,172
Percentage	84.39%	5.90%	5.38%
- Results by ward
Mayor before election
Lorry Greenberg
Elected mayor
Lorry Greenberg

The city of Ottawa, Canada held municipal elections on December 6, 1976.

Mayor Lorry Greenberg was easily re-elected.

== Mayor ==
Candidate	Votes	%
Lorry Greenberg (X)	49,788	84.39
Alphonse Frederick Lapointe	3,482	5.90
Bill Foster	3,172	5.38
Mike Sammon	2,556	4.33
Total valid votes	58,998	99.42
Rejected votes	342	0.58
Total votes	59,340	
Source: Ottawa Municipal Election: 1976 (Detailed Results)

=== Results by ward ===
Ward	Foster	Greenberg	Lapointe	Sammon
Rideau (1)	339	5,190	603	301
By-St. George's (2)	211	3,702	540	168
Wellington (3)	228	2,386	200	161
Capital (4)	321	5,182	271	333
Dalhousie (5)	281	2,826	265	242
Elmdale-Victoria (6)	298	4,480	334	217
Queensboro (7)	338	4,911	283	251
Britannia (8)	272	5,061	265	225
Carleton (9)	252	5,044	195	170
Alta Vista (10)	311	6,072	300	238
Gloucester (11)	321	4,934	226	250

=== Candidates ===
Bill Foster, 27, owner of Tender Touch, a massage parlour. Entered the race after several raids on his business. Ran on a law and order platform, promising to reduce violent crime in the city, and better security at local detention centres. He also supported the reduction in speed limits on residential streets, revitalization of the city core, reduction of red tape and taxes on small business, and opposed the development of satellite cities outside the Ottawa Greenbelt. He lived in Kanata.

Lorry Greenberg, 42, incumbent mayor of the city since 1974, and former alderman and controller. Previously worked as a home builder, and was vice president of Minto Construction Ltd. Ran on his record of neighbourhood planning, community involvement in civic affairs, and "keeping a reasonably firm grip on the city's purse strings". As mayor, he attracted attention for his opposition to body rub parlours, and for calling out the federal government for "failing to deal openly and equally with the city on planning matters".

Alphonse Lapointe, 53, businessman, owner of Wheel-a-Way Transport, Ltd., a tree pruning and lighting maintenance firm. Perennial candidate for mayor. Promised free parking at the Civic Centre and at local hospitals, astroturf at Lansdowne Park, lower housing costs, more industry in the city, elderly and handicapped exemptions to property taxes, and opposed the city's new anti-smoking by-law.

Mike Sammon, 33, OC Transpo bus driver, and owner of a small pet cemetery. Previously ran for deputy reeve of Nepean in 1974 and as an Independent candidate in the 1975 Ontario general election in Carleton. He ran on a platform of putting "healthy welfare recipients to work", creating a task force to investigate welfare cases, "cutting back on... overpaid bureaucrats", and more spending on fire and police services.

== Ottawa Board of Control ==
(4 elected)

Candidate	Votes	%
Marion Dewar (X)	37,288	
Don Reid	34,091	
Pat Nicol	28,565	
Ralph Sutherland	23,970	
Doug Payne	14,694	
Ernest Bouchard	8,985	
Joseph Louis Paradis	5,861	

== City council ==
Map of Ottawa's Wards used in this election: 1. Rideau Ward; 2. By-St. George's Ward; 3. Wellington Ward; 4. Capital Ward; 5. Dalhousie Ward; 6. Elmdale-Victoria Ward; 7. Queensboro Ward; 8. Britannia Ward; 9. Carleton Ward; 10. Alta Vista Ward; 11. Gloucester Ward.

Alta Vista Ward
Candidate	Votes	%
Don Kay (X)	3,702	
Nancy McGee	3,145	

Gloucester Ward
Candidate	Votes	%
Joe Quinn (X)	2,399	
Patrick MacAdam	1,746	
Bill Zlepnig	1,242	
Brian Tracey	169	

Britannia Ward
Candidate	Votes	%
Marlene Catterall	3,041	
Sandy Boyce (X)	2,790	

Rideau Ward
Candidate	Votes	%
Rhéal Robert (X)	3,378	
Karl Parks	2,104	
Cyrille Goulet	1,096	

Capital Ward
Candidate	Votes	%
Joe Cassey	3,441	
Don Lockhart (X)	1,885	
Thom Bennett	1,812	
Leo Morency	148	

Carleton Ward
Candidate	Votes	%
Toddy Kehoe (X)	3,296	
Robbins Elliott	2,221	

Queensboro Ward
Candidate	Votes	%
Trip Kennedy (X)	4,402	
Ian Connerty	926	
Marina Robillard	452	

Dalhousie Ward
Candidate	Votes	%
Rolf Hasenack (X)	2,384	
Gale Kerwin	1,440	

Elmdale-Victoria Ward
Candidate	Votes	%
Rolly Wall	1,670	
Walter Ryan	1,509	
Chris Chilton	1,450	
Alice Morin	538	
Ignazio Maniscalo	164	

By-St. George's Ward
Candidate	Votes	%
Georges Bedard (X)	3,785	
Mauril Bélanger	694	

Wellington Ward
Candidate	Votes	%
Brian Bourns (X)	2,091	
John Rankin	586	
Sam McLean	322	

== Ottawa Board of Education Trustees ==
Results for the OBE Trustees were as follows:

Six to be elected in each zone

Eastern Zone (Vanier, Rockcliffe Park, Alta Vista, Gloucester, Rideau, By-St. Georges, Capital)
Candidate	Vote
Jane Dobell	9,364
Don Francis	7,830
Roy Bushfield	6,376
Ted Best	6,144
Helen Slater	4,460
John Samuel	4,078
Robert Burns	3,593
Adolph Feingold	3,239
Michael McKenna	3,206
Gwen Bower-Binns	3,200
Gerry Trudel	2,774
Larry Geller	2,719
Gordon Simester	2,226
John Butterworth	2,065
Wayne Kay	2,054
Tim Craig	1,832
Donald Graham	1,507
Christa Richardson	1,315
Gary Kellam	967
Boshra Feltaous	579

Western Zone (Britannia, Carleton, Queensboro, Elmdale-Victoria, Dalhousie, Wellington)
Candidate	Vote
Bill Law	10,310
Mary Gilmour	8,582
Nick van Duyvendyk	8,370
Sinclair Abell	8,276
Robert Beatty	7,816
William Harback	7,025
Wayne Wilson	5,193
Donald Smith	4,823
Kathleen Tuskey	4,347
Goldstein	4,300
Ian Maclennan	3,020
Daniel Gray	2,452

4 to be elected

Separate school supporters: Ottawa
Candidate	Vote
Dalton McGuinty, Sr.	7,752
Jacques Faucher	6,915
Lucien Bradet	6,770
Jacques Beauchamp	6,321
Daniel Kealey	5,749
Leonard Trudel	5,178
Cathy Kerr	5,145
Barbara Champagne	5,073

1 to be elected

Separate school supporters: Vanier
Candidate	Vote
Edouard Gagnon	1,882
Denise Matte	1,535
