= 1982 Ottawa municipal election =

Election in Ontario, Canada

1982 Ottawa mayoral election
- November 8, 1982
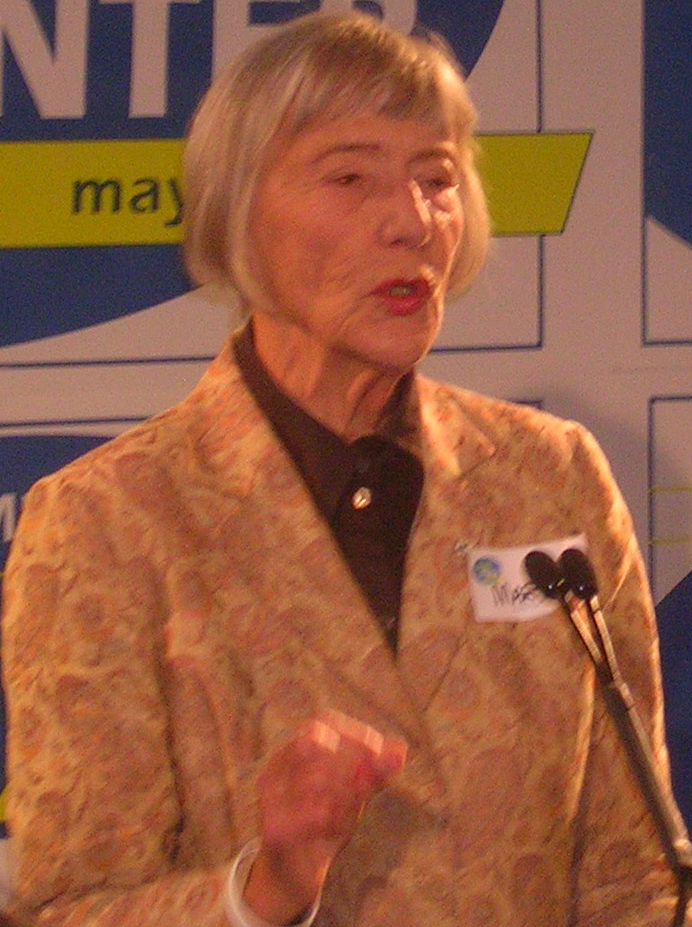
Candidate	Marion Dewar	Darrel Kent
Popular vote	57,167	48,461
Percentage	52.02%	44.10%
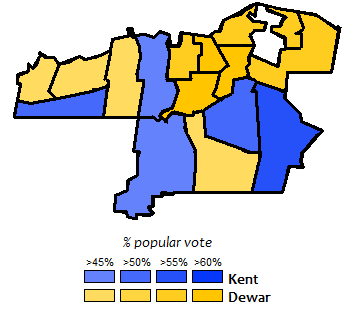
Mayor before election
Marion Dewar
Elected mayor
Marion Dewar

The city of Ottawa, Canada held municipal elections on November 8, 1982.

Mayor Marion Dewar was re-elected, defeating conservative alderman Darrel Kent.

== Mayor ==
Official results

Dewar was re-elected, thanks to support from the city's urban wards, plus her home region in the suburban west and the Francophone east end of the city. She won 10 of the city's 15 wards, with her strongest support in the city's core, where she won over 60% of the vote in three wards: St. George's (63.7%), Wellington (63.2%) and Capital (61.6%). Kent was the strongest in the city's suburban south end, doing his best in his home ward of Canterbury, where he won 59% of the vote.

Candidate	Votes	%
Marion Dewar (X)	57,168	52.02
Darrel Kent	48,461	44.10
T. Joseph McCarthy	2,060	1.87
Marc Gauvin	1,725	1.57
Arnold Guetta	487	0.44

== Ottawa City Council ==
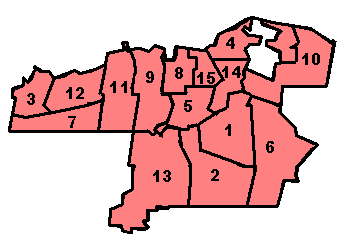
Map of Ottawa's Wards used in this election: 1. Alta Vista Ward; 2. Billings Ward; 3. Britannia Ward; 4. By-Rideau Ward; 5. Capital Ward; 6. Canterbury Ward; 7. Carleton Ward; 8. Dalhousie Ward; 9. Elmdale Ward; 10. Overbrook-Forbes Ward; 11. Queensboro Ward; 12. Richmond Ward; 13. Riverside Ward; 14. St. George's Ward; 15. Wellington Ward .

Alta Vista Ward
Candidate	Votes	%
Greg MacDougall (X)	6,413	79.31
Earle MacPhail	1,673	20.69

Billings Ward
Candidate	Votes	%
Brian Bourns (X)	3,703	55.25
Bill Zlepnig	2,999	44.75

Britannia Ward
Candidate	Votes	%
Marlene Catterall (X)	2,840	49.80
Paul MacKay	1,487	26.07
Terry O'Neill	1,376	24.13

By-Rideau Ward
Candidate	Votes	%
Marc Laviolette (X)	4,466	54.53
Pierre Labelle	3,724	45.47

Capital Ward
Candidate	Votes	%
Howard Smith (X)	3,150	43.22
Dave Hagerman	2,795	38.35
David Brasset	1,343	18.43

Canterbury Ward
Candidate	Votes	%
Michael McSweeney	3,706	44.44
Sue Snider	3,154	37.82
Sig Schmidt	1,479	17.74

Carleton Ward
Candidate	Votes	%
Toddy Kehoe (X)	2,631	36.56
Bob Morrison	2,395	33.28
Barbara Lajeunesse	2,171	30.17

Queensboro Ward
Candidate	Votes	%
Terry Denison (X)	5,476	75.97
Gordon MacMichael	1,732	24.03

Dalhousie Ward
Candidate	Votes	%
Rolf Hasenack (X)	3,285	56.66
Warren Ralph	2,513	43.34

Elmdale Ward
Candidate	Votes	%
Graham Bird (X)	4,742	81.94
Geoffrey Sharpe	1,045	18.06

Overbrook-Forbes Ward
Candidate	Votes	%
Rhéal Robert (X)	4,383	58.53
Fernande Casey	2,819	37.64
Marion Cray	287	3.83

Richmond Ward
Candidate	Votes	%
Jacquelin Holzman	4,796	48.51
Bob Chiarelli	4,214	42.63
Rick Stewart	876	8.86

Riverside Ward
Candidate	Votes	%
Jim Durrell (X)	6,856	87.53
Gregory Minion	977	12.47

St. George's Ward
Candidate	Votes	%
Nancy Smith (X)	4,644	77.41
Sam MacLean	826	13.77
Serge Girard	529	8.82

Wellington Ward
Candidate	Votes	%
Diane Holmes	2,920	46.28
Joe Cassey (X)	2,522	39.97
Jack Bowie-Reed	867	13.74

== Ottawa Board of Education Trustees ==
Six to be elected in each zone

Eastern Zone (529/530 polls)	Vote
Jane Dobell (X)	17,501
Russ Jackson	13,053
Ted Best (X)	12,781
Roy Bushfield	12,423
Don Francis	11,942
John Smart	10,587
Marjorie Loughrey (X)	9,701
John Samuel	8,872
David Armstrong	9,027
Michael McKenna (X)	8,540
Ken Ellis	6,069
Anne Dupuis	6,156
Anne-Marie Kolinski-Corneau	5,230
Allan Simpson	4,483
David Delisle	3,953
George Denison	3,709
Colin Simpson	2,997
Barry Lemoine	2,344
William Voller	2,283

Western Zone	Vote
Bill Law (X)	13,733
Robert Beatty (X)	12,769
Sandra Goldstein (X)	10,903
Bill Gowling	10,817
Kathy Yach	9,058
Alexander Cullen	8,595
Wayne Wilson (X)	7,527
John Jackson (X)	7,310
John Wright (X)	7,262
Abby Pollonetsky	7,221
Marion Lothian	6,377
Robert Grace	6,366
Harry Albright	5,381
Stephen Delaney	5,306
Barbara Mollon	4,455
Calvin Kempffer	3,041
Dale Alkerton	2,373

4 to be elected

Separate school supporters: Ottawa (937/938 polls)	Vote
Jacques Beauchamp (X)	18,925
Robert Belanger (X)	17,877
Dalton McGuinty, Sr. (X)	16,585
Lucien Bradet (X)	15,755
Thomas Kent	15,442
Edouard Gagnon	10,905
Ken Bruton	8,152

1 to be elected

Separate school supporters: Vanier	Vote	%
Claudette Boyer	3,378	56.21
Alain Gougeon	2,632	43.79
