= 1972 Ottawa municipal election =

Election in Ontario, Canada

The city of Ottawa, Canada held municipal elections on December 4, 1972.

Controller Pierre Benoit is easily elected without significant opposition. Ottawa's city council is divided in two, as this marks the first election where only one alderman is elected from each ward, as opposed to two.

== Mayor of Ottawa ==
Candidate	Votes	%
Pierre Benoit	57,634	90.26
Alphonse Frederick Lapointe	2,520	3.52
Oscar Orenstein	2,095	3.28
Jack Ridout	1,602	2.51

== Ottawa Board of Control ==
(4 elected) 859/861 polls reporting

Candidate	Votes	%
Lorry Greenberg (X)	40,438	
Garry Guzzo (X)	30,357	
Tom McDougall (X)	30,267	
Ernie Jones (X)	24,721	
Charlie St. Germain	23,702	
Eileen Scotton	20,027	
Byron Hyde	16,599	
Sam McLean	6,853	
Joseph Louis Paradis	5,167	
Brian Bourns	3,856	

== City council ==
Map of Ottawa's Wards used in this election: 1. Rideau Ward; 2. By-St. George's Ward; 3. Wellington Ward; 4. Capital Ward; 5. Dalhousie Ward; 6. Elmdale-Victoria Ward; 7. Queensboro Ward; 8. Britannia Ward; 9. Carleton Ward; 10. Alta Vista Ward; 11. Gloucester Ward.

Alta Vista Ward
Candidate	Votes	%
Don Kay (X)	Acclaimed	

Gloucester Ward
Candidate	Votes	%
Joe Quinn (X)	4,803	
William Mason	1,176	

Britannia Ward
Candidate	Votes	%
Marion Dewar	1,367	
Sandy Boyce	862	
Brian McNally	714	
Mike McMullen	566	
Ken Creppin	452	
Charles Strang	384	
Suzanne Saunders	199	
Richard MacDonald	198	
Gerald Cammy	197	
Gary Hugh	19	

Rideau Ward
Candidate	Votes	%
Rhéal Robert (X)	3,218*	
Des Bender (X)	3,192*	
Bob Edwards	350	

*Official results published on December 7. A recount held on December 27 indicated Robert had only won by 12 votes.

Capital Ward
Candidate	Votes	%
Don Lockhart	1,652	
Ron Wood	1,206	
Ian Kimmerly	1,692	
Randal Marlin	1,066	
Claude Burchill	821	
Ed Henry	517	
Leo Morency	273	
Tad Pachulski	153	

Carleton Ward
Candidate	Votes	%
Bill Law (X)	4,373	
Ken Read	1,310	

Queensboro Ward
Candidate	Votes	%
Ed Mulkins (X)	2,422	
Len Trudel	1,718	
Eleanor Parmelee	987	
Grant Johnston	369	
Douglas Brown	252	
George Ayoub	134	

Dalhousie Ward
Candidate	Votes	%
Gale Kerwin (X)	1,618	
Rudy Capogreco (X)	1,368	
Kitty Duggan	236	
Gerald Tremblay	169	

Elmdale-Victoria Ward
Candidate	Votes	%
Walter Ryan (X)	2,511	
Keith Hearn	1,980	
Pat Nicol	1,403	

By-St. George's Ward
Candidate	Votes	%
Jules Morin (X)	2,383	
Georges Bedard	1,479	
Gerard Levesque	1,209	
Bernard Wood	1,175	

Wellington Ward
Candidate	Votes	%
Joe Cassey	1,516	
Matt McGrath (X)	1,110	
Jim Robinson	1,083	
Les Jones	481	
