= 1980 Ottawa municipal election =

Election in Ontario, Canada

1980 Ottawa mayoral election
- November 10, 1980
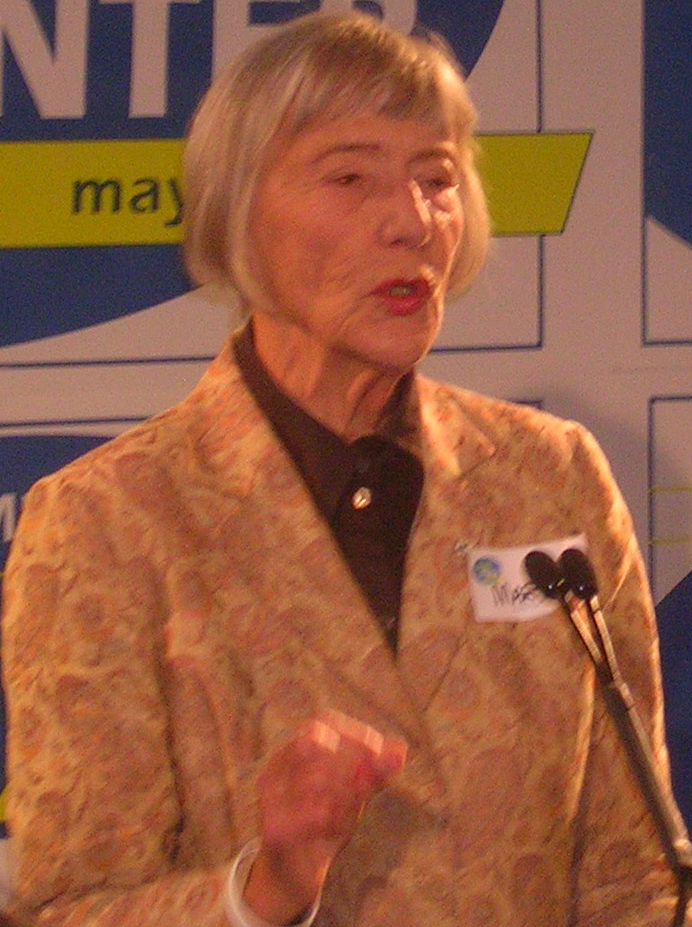
Candidate	Marion Dewar	Pat Nicol
Popular vote	49,687	33,151
Percentage	57.03%	38.05%
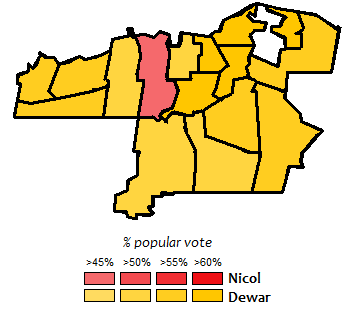
Mayor before election
Marion Dewar
Elected mayor
Marion Dewar

The city of Ottawa, Canada held municipal elections on November 10, 1980.

Mayor Marion Dewar defeated former alderman Pat Nicol in a re-match of the 1978 race. This is the first election in 70 years without the Ottawa Board of Control, as it had been abolished. Council stayed the same size however, as four wards were added.

== Mayor ==
Marion Dewar swept the city in her re-election, winning all but one ward. Her best results came in the city's urban wards, with her best ward being Capital, where she won 63.4% of the vote. She also topped 60% in By-Rideau, St. George's and Wellington wards. Her only loss was in Elmdale, which Nicol won narrowly by 43 votes. Nicol represented Elmdale on city council.

Candidate	Votes	%
Marion Dewar (X)	49,687	57.03
Pat Nicol	33,151	38.05
Alphonse Frederick Lapointe	2,357	2.71
John Turmel	1,928	2.21

== City council ==
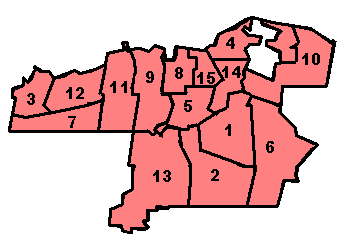
Map of Ottawa's Wards used in this election: 1. Alta Vista Ward; 2. Billings Ward; 3. Britannia Ward; 4. By-Rideau Ward; 5. Capital Ward; 6. Canterbury Ward; 7. Carleton Ward; 8. Dalhousie Ward; 9. Elmdale Ward; 10. Overbrook-Forbes Ward; 11. Queensboro Ward; 12. Richmond Ward; 13. Riverside Ward; 14. St. George's Ward; 15. Wellington Ward .

Alta Vista Ward
Candidate	Votes	%
Greg MacDougall	2,927	43.38
Roy Bushfield	2,124	31.48
John Coe	1,005	14.90
Fern Payne	691	10.24

Billings Ward
Candidate	Votes	%
Brian Bourns	2,057	41.60
Bill Zlepnig	1,647	33.31
Geraldine Trudel	1,241	25.10

Britannia Ward
Candidate	Votes	%
Marlene Catterall (X)	3,354	80.11
Paul MacKay	833	19.89

By-Rideau Ward
Candidate	Votes	%
Marc Laviolette	3,590	53.69
Bruce Grant	3,096	46.31

Capital Ward
Candidate	Votes	%
Howard Smith	3,358	57.03
Dave Haggerman	1,746	29.65
Vince Capogreco	784	13.32

Canterbury Ward
Candidate	Votes	%
Darrel Kent	3,892	56.88
Don Kay (X)	2,951	43.12

Carleton Ward
Candidate	Votes	%
Toddy Kehoe (X)	Acclaimed	

Queensboro Ward
Candidate	Votes	%
Terry Denison	3,215	49.45
Bob Fox	1,822	28.02
Vic Grostern	1,026	15.78
Cyprian Campbell	439	6.75

Dalhousie Ward
Candidate	Votes	%
Rolf Hasenack (X)	2,137	55.19
Gale Kerwin	1,587	40.99
Dave Parent	148	3.82

Elmdale Ward
Candidate	Votes	%
Graham Bird	2,543	43.31
Byron Hyde	1,927	32.82
Chris Chilton (X)	1,401	23.86

Overbrook-Forbes Ward
Candidate	Votes	%
Rhéal Robert (X)	3,873	67.83
Elwood Armour	1,413	24.75
Jos-Louis Paradis	424	7.43

Richmond Ward
Candidate	Votes	%
Don Reid	4,274	56.77
Sandy Boyce	1,995	26.50
Bill Harback	1,259	16.72

Riverside Ward
Candidate	Votes	%
Jim Durrell	3,503	48.50
Gordon Lennox	1,877	25.99
Natalie MacPhee	1,075	14.89
Sig Schmidt	767	10.62

St. George's Ward
Candidate	Votes	%
Nancy Smith	1,978	36.95
Gail Lord	1,578	29.48
Thomas Richard	1,339	25.01
Sam McLean	167	3.12
Serge Girard	160	2.99
Robert Farquharson	131	2.45

Wellington Ward
Candidate	Votes	%
Joe Cassey (X)	Acclaimed	

== Ottawa Board of Education Trustees ==
Six to be elected in each zone

Eastern Zone	Vote
Jane Dobell (X)	16,917
Don Francis (X)	15,100
Ted Best (X)	13,316
John Smart	12,347
Michael McKenna (X)	11,592
Marjorie Loughrey	10,800
John Samuel (X)	10,468
Rosemarie McNairn	9,390
Ken Campbell	8,330
Hershell Sax	5,569
Robert Kolbeins	3,235

Western Zone	Vote
Bill Law	15,559
Robert Beatty (X)	14,420
Wayne Wilson (X)	11,824
Sandra Goldstein (X)	11,469
John Wright	11,175
John Jackson	10,924
Calvin Kempffer	8,077
Norman Fera	6,453

4 to be elected

Separate school supporters	Vote
Jacques Beauchamp (X)	17,564
Robert Bélanger (X)	17,484
Dalton McGuinty, Sr. (X)	15,967
Lucien Bradet (X)	14,918
Thomas Kent	13,200

1 to be elected

Vanier Trustee	Vote
Denise Matte	Acclaimed
