= Ernie Jones (politician) =

Canadian politician (1910–2005)

Nepean Township Councillor
- In office January 1, 1948 – December 31, 1949

Ottawa Alderman
- In office January 1, 1950 – December 31, 1952
- Preceded by: Ward annexed by Ottawa
- Succeeded by: Lon Campbell
- Constituency: Westboro Ward

Ottawa Controller
- In office January 1, 1955 – December 31, 1960
- Preceded by: John Powers
- Succeeded by: Lloyd Francis, Don Reid
- In office January 1, 1963 – December 31, 1974
- Preceded by: Paul Tardif, Wilbert Hamilton
- Succeeded by: Marion Dewar, Don Reid, Bill Law

Deputy Mayor of Ottawa
- In office September 5, 1972 – December 31, 1972
- Preceded by: Claude Bennett
- Succeeded by: Lorry Greenberg

Personal details
- Born: October 6, 1910 Westboro, Ontario
- Died: May 15, 2005 (aged 94) Arnprior, Ontario
- Spouse: Ruth Irene Munro (m. 1934; died 1991)
- Children: 1

Ernest William Jones (October 6, 1910 – May 15, 2005) was a Canadian politician. He was an alderman on Ottawa City Council from 1950 to 1952, and was a member of the Ottawa Board of Control from 1955 to 1960 and from 1963 to 1974. He unsuccessfully ran for mayor of Ottawa in 1960, and was Deputy Mayor of the city in 1972.

Known for living his life "fast and aggressive", he was a believer in "grass-roots contact with the electorate", his electoral base was the small businessman and the suburban homeowner, whose main concern he stated was "careful spending of their tax buck ... When taxes go up, they want to know exactly why". He presided over the city's recreation and parks department during its infancy, and helped obtain an agreement with the Ottawa Board of Education for sharing playgrounds and other recreational facilities.

== Early life ==
Jones was born on October 6, 1910, at his family home on Churchill Avenue to William Donald Jones, a Canadian bicycle rider champion and son of a Welsh immigrant, and Elizabeth Harriet Sullivan, a descendant of a pioneering family who operated a farm in the City View area. He attended Westboro and Broadview Avenue public schools, Nepean High School, the High School of Commerce, Willis Business College and Carleton College. In his youth he worked as a cake baker at Standard Bread, as an office boy and a clerk in the Department of Veterans Affairs. He then went to work in the Finance and Treasury Department, later becoming an administration officer.

== Early political career ==
Jones was elected to Nepean Township Council in the 1947 municipal elections, the only newcomer elected to council that year. He finished third in the three-seat at-large council race with 2,063 votes. While a member of the Nepean council, Jones supported the annexation of the entirety of the Township into Ottawa, but preferred ratepayers have a say on the matter. Jones was re-elected in the 1948 municipal election, this time winning 3,558 votes and finishing second.

With the urban northern part of Nepean Township set to be annexed by Ottawa in 1950, Jones ran to represent part of newly annexed territory (Westboro Ward) on Ottawa City Council in a special election held on December 19, 1949. Jones won one of two seats in the ward, finishing second behind former Nepean Reeve Harry Parslow with 1,189 votes. Jones declared that his first action as an alderman would be extending water mains and sewers into the newly annexed territory. Both Jones and Parslow ran unopposed in the 1950 Ottawa municipal election.

Outside of politics, Jones became a Life Underwriter with London Life Insurance in 1951, a position he held throughout his political career.

== Board of Control, 1952–1960 ==
Jones decided to run for a spot on Ottawa's Board of Control for the 1952 Ottawa municipal election, running on "a more efficient administration in the city". In the election, Jones finished sixth for the four-seat board, with 22,188 votes, and was not elected. Jones ran again for a spot on the Board in the 1954 Ottawa municipal election, and this time was successful, finishing fourth with 28,385 votes. During the campaign, he promised "a fair deal in civic affairs to one and all".

Jones was re-elected to the Board of Control in the 1956 Ottawa municipal election, finishing in second place and winning 26,480 votes. He ran for re-election in the 1956 Ottawa municipal election. At the time, he was the Controller of Finance. Jones was re-elected again, finishing second with 30,473 votes.

== 1960 run for mayor ==
On March 15, 1960, Jones announced at the closing ceremony of the City of Ottawa Bonspiel at the Ottawa Curling Club that he was intending to run for mayor of the city in the 1960 Ottawa municipal election. Jones ran on a platform of "full and ultimate development" of the city, where it would be "recognized as a full co-partner with the federal government in the planning of the National Canada", and "above all ... wants to see that development effect with the least possible cost to the taxpayers as a whole". He also wanted the city to diversify away from being just a city of civil servants into a "diversified industrial city (where) its people will have many avenues of employment". He also wanted to find new sources of tax revenue, suggesting that crown corporations such as the CBC, the Central Mortgage and Housing Corporation and the National Research Council "should ... be paying a business tax as does any small businessman and factory owner in Ottawa". In the election, Jones finished a distant third winning just 9,317 votes, over 26,000 votes behind the winner, Charlotte Whitton.

== Board of Control, 1963–1974 ==
After two years outside of politics, Jones announced he would run for his old job on the Ottawa Board of Control in the 1962 Ottawa municipal election, promising to "serve faithfully, with integrity, dignity, action and foresight". In the election, he finished fourth with 36,495 votes, earning the fourth spot on the board. During the 1963–64 term, Jones was credited for reviving the Ottawa Winter Carnival (a predecessor of Winterlude) in 1963, for which he was the chairman. During the term of office, Jones grew increasingly frustrated with the mayorship of Charlotte Whitton, and was "tired of angry fights and arguments" on council. Considering running for mayor gain, in the end Jones opted to run for re-election on the Board in the 1964 Ottawa municipal election. His "chief concern" in the election being the works department, which "spend about 70 percent of the city's budget". In the election, Jones was re-elected to his Board of Control seat, winning 47,331 votes, and finishing second. Meanwhile, Charlotte Whitton lost her bid for re-election as mayor. During the 1965–66 term, Jones continued his work as the chief organizer of the Winter Carnival, and was the "architect" of a new equipment pool, and was the negotiator with civic unions at contract time. Jones was re-elected to his board seat in the 1966 Ottawa municipal election, this time placing fourth with 39,488 votes. His drop to fourth was blamed on his "verbal jousts" with mayoral candidate Rev. Donald Stirling. During a candidate meeting, after Stirling quipped that Jones should talk about how much insurance he sold to developer Robert Campeau, Jones replied "you lie.. [t]hat is a dirty, rotten stinking thing for a minister to say. You're a disgrace to the cloth; you are a vicious liar.". Stirling also claimed that Jones called him a "bastard".

Jones ran for re-election in the 1969 Ottawa municipal election, the first election with Ottawa as part of the new Regional Municipality of Ottawa–Carleton. Regarding the new two-tier arrangement in the region, Jones stated that he would "support any workable plan to reduce the size of Ottawa's council, but ... [it is] more important to try and make sure regional government is the only local administration [in the region] by 1973." He also campaigned on the city insisting on "being told of the federal government's long range plans" for the region. In the election, Jones finished fourth again, with 29,831 votes, 385 votes ahead of the fifth place candidate.

In 1970, Jones was appointed chairman of the finance committee of Ontario Association Mayors and Reeves. During the 1970–72 term, Jones was chairman of the Ottawa planning board, and a member of the regional planning board. He was named deputy mayor of Ottawa in August 1972 following the resignation of Claude Bennett. After promising to retire from politics at the end of his term, mayor Pierre Benoit convinced Jones to run for re-election to the Board of Control in the 1972 Ottawa municipal election. One facet of his platform was making an "immediate start on preparing a rapid transit system for the future". He also stressed his past accomplishments, access to power-holders at senior levels of government, and his experience, which would balance the "youthful board of control". In the election, Jones once again won the fourth spot on the Board of Control, winning nearly 25,000 votes.

Jones officially resigned his position at London Life Insurance January 1, 1973 to focus entirely on his job at city hall. Jones announced his retirement from politics in August 1974. During his final term, he worked to expand the Highland Games competitions at Lansdowne Park, which he helped launch in 1971.

== Outside of politics ==
After retiring from politics, Jones became the first President of the SAGE Kiwanis Club in 1975. He also became the president of the Central Canada Exhibition Association (CCEA). As president of the CCEA, he supported moving the Exhibition from Lansdowne Park to a site in the Greenbelt.

Outside of politics, Jones was a Charter Member (and first secretary) of the Granite Curling Club. A keen curler, he participated in several City of Ottawa bonspiels. He lost a bet when the 1967 Macdonald Brier could not be played at the Ottawa Civic Centre, as it had not been completed yet (it was played across the river in Hull, Quebec instead). He was also the President of the Westoboro Kiwanis and President of the Ottawa Humane Society. He attended Westboro United Church, where he was a steward, and was a member of the Orange Order, becoming grand master of the Grand Lodge of Orange Young Britons of British America in 1941.

He died at the Arnprior Hospital in Arnprior, Ontario on May 15, 2005.
