= 1978 Ontario municipal elections =

All municipalities in the Canadian province of Ontario held elections on November 13, 1978, to elect mayors or reeves, councillors, school trustees, and (in some areas) public utilities commissioners. Some municipalities also held referendums on various issues.

The most closely watched contest was in Toronto, where John Sewell was elected as mayor.

== Elected mayors and reeves ==
- Ajax: Clark Mason
- Barrie: Ross Archer
- Belleville: J. Ben Corke
- Brampton: Jim Archdekin
- Brantford: Charles Bowen (details)
- Brockville: Robert Sheridan
- Burlington: Roly Bird
- Caledon: John Clarkson
- Cambridge: Claudette Millar
- Chatham: Curtis Carter
- Cornwall: Gerald Parisien
- Dundas: Joe Bennett
- East York: Alan Redway (details)
- Etobicoke: Dennis Flynn (details)
- Flamborough: Betty Ward
- Fort Erie: Stella Ziff
- Georgina: Joe Dales
- Gloucester: Betty Stewart (details)
- Grimsby: Bob Arkell
- Guelph: Norm Jary
- Haldimand: David Peirson
- Halton Hills: Pete Pomeroy
- Hamilton: Jack MacDonald
- Kingston: Ken Keyes
- Kingston (Township): Peter Beeman
- Kitchener: Morley Rosenberg
- London: Al Gleeson
- Markham: Tony Roman
- Milton: Don Gordon
- Mississauga: Hazel McCallion (details)
- Nanticoke: George Dmetriuc
- Nepean: Ben Franklin (details)
- Newcastle: Garnet Rickard
- Newmarket: Bob Forhan
- Niagara Falls: Wayne Thomson
- North Bay: Merle Dickerson
- North York: Mel Lastman (details)
- Oakville: Harry Barrett
- Orillia: Dave Macdonald
- Oshawa: Jim Potticary
- Ottawa: Marion Dewar (details)
- Owen Sound: Bob Rutherford
- Peterborough: Cam Wasson
- Pickering: Jack Anderson
- Port Colborne: Bob Saracino
- Rayside-Balfour: Gilles Pelland
- Richmond Hill: Dave Schiller
- Sarnia: Andy Brandt
- Sault Ste. Marie: Nick Trbovich
- Scarborough: Gus Harris (details)
- St. Catharines: Roy Adams
- Stoney Creek: Gordon Dean
- Stratford: Ted Blowes
- St. Thomas: Donald Hitch
- Sudbury: Jim Gordon
- Thunder Bay: Dusty Miller
- Timmins: Michael Doody
- Toronto: John Sewell (details)
- Trenton: Duncan McDonald
- Valley East: Howard Armstrong
- Vanier: Bernard Grandmaître (details)
- Vaughan: Garnet Williams
- Waterloo: Marjorie Carroll
- Welland: Eugene Stranges
- Whitby: Jim Gartshore
- Windsor: Bert Weeks
- Woodstock: Wendy Calder
- Woolwich: Ken Seiling
- York: Gayle Christie(details)
