= Ralph Sutherland =

Canadian civil servant (1925–2023)

Ottawa Alderman
- In office January 1, 1970 – December 31, 1972
- Preceded by: Howard Henry and Lloyd Francis
- Succeeded by: Bill Law
- Constituency: Carleton Ward

Ottawa Controller
- In office January 1, 1977 – December 1, 1980
- Preceded by: Garry Guzzo, Bill Law
- Succeeded by: Board abolished

Personal details
- Born: October 19, 1925 Pouce Coupe, British Columbia
- Died: June 28, 2023 (aged 97) Perth, Ontario
- Party: New Democratic Party
- Spouse(s): Dr. Eleanor Sutherland (m. 1951; div. 1986); Jeannette Bennett (m. 1995; died 2019)
- Children: 4

Ralph William Sutherland (born October 19, 1925 – June 28, 2023) was a Canadian physician, administrator, professor, politician, forester and author. He served on Ottawa City Council as an alderman from 1970 to 1972 and as a controller from 1977 to 1980. While serving on council, he was sometimes considered the council's conscience, and one of its most intelligent, principled members. A member of the left-wing New Democratic Party, he believed in getting the public involved in municipal affairs. Despite his party affiliation, he had a fiscally conservative streak, garnering a reputation as a 'slasher' during budget meetings.

== Early career ==
Sutherland was born in Pouce Coupe, British Columbia, the son of H. T. Wesley Sutherland and Eleanor Sharp, and grew up in Dawson Creek. He served with the Royal Canadian Air Force from 1943 to 1945, allowing him to enrol at the University of Alberta. He graduated with a degree in medicine from there in 1952. After graduating, he interned in Edmonton for two years and Camrose, Alberta for one. He then practised medicine in Eastend, Saskatchewan for four years. He then obtained a diploma in hospital administration from the University of Toronto and joined the Saskatchewan health department in 1961. In 1963, Sutherland became the director of the Saskatchewan Medical Care Insurance Commission. While serving as director, he oversaw the roll out of medicare in the province as well as the Saskatchewan doctors' strike. He resigned his position in 1964. He moved to Ottawa in 1965 to help the federal government implement medicare on a national level, but only stayed in that position until 1966 when he became the associate professor of hospital administration at the University of Ottawa.

== Political career ==
Sutherland first entered the political foray when he was nominated to be New Democratic Party candidate in the riding of Ottawa West for the 1968 Canadian federal election. Upon being nominated, he criticized the Liberal government's "failure to provide its civil servants with goals or philosophical objectives" and was "distressed over the prospect of the ... election being turned into a French-English battleground". In the election, Sutherland won 11% of the voting, finishing third behind Liberal Lloyd Francis and Progressive Conservative Dick Bell.

The following year, Sutherland entered municipal politics, running for a seat on Ottawa City Council in Carleton Ward. In the election, he supported a gradual establishment of single-tier government, and a quick establishment of rapid transit. In the 1969 Ottawa municipal election, he won a seat on council, after finishing second in the two-seat ward. He was one of three municipal candidates endorsed by the Ottawa West NDP, along with Evelyn Gigantes who ran in Queensboro Ward and Joan Gawn who ran for a seat as a trustee for the Ottawa Board of Education. During his term as alderman, he "revolutionized city council" by setting up a municipal action group in his ward, which called for the increase in public participation in municipal affairs.

In February 1971, Sutherland was unopposed in his nomination to be the Ontario New Democratic Party's candidate in Ottawa West in the 1971 Ontario general election. In the election, Sutherland finished second behind the Progressive Conservative's Don Morrow, winning over 11,000 votes to Morrow's over 18,000.

Sutherland did not run for re-election in the 1972 Ottawa municipal election, electing to be the campaign manager for future-mayor Marion Dewar, who was running to be the alderman for Britannia Ward. Following his retirement, Sutherland headed the City hall citizen's information committee, which pushed for the establishment of a 24-hour information service.

Sutherland re-entered politics by throwing his hat in the ring for a seat on Ottawa's Board of Control in the 1976 Ottawa municipal election. He ran on a platform of making Ottawa "a place to live at a price you can afford", access to reasonable recreation space, improving services and facilities for senior citizens and the handicapped. In the election, Sutherland won the fourth and final seat on the Board. Following the election, which also gave him a seat on the Ottawa-Carleton Regional Municipality Council, he served on the region's planning and social services committees.

Sutherland ran for re-election to the Board of Control in the 1978 Ottawa municipal election. He ran on a platform of that re-affirmed "the importance of 'quality of life' in a city 'designed for people'", and advocated a "'responsible administration' of tax dollars... but not if holding the line works to the detriment of social services". He wanted to help "senior citizens and others in need, and... continue to support public housing". He was also the only controller who supported abolishing the board. In the 1978 election, Sutherland was re-elected to the fourth seat on the Board of Control.

In 1979, Sutherland's motion to abolish the Board of Control passed city council by an 11–4 vote, and would therefore be abolished in time for the 1980 Ottawa municipal election. During his second term on regional council, he served on the region's board of health and Civic Hospital board.

With the Board of Control abolished, Sutherland announced he wouldn't run for election as an alderman in his ward, unless "he doesn't think any of the adermanic candidates in his neighbourhood are adequate". He ultimately did not run for a seat on council.

== Post political career ==
Following his retirement, Sutherland returned to teaching full-time at the University of Ottawa, teaching courses in hospital administration. In 1988, he co-authored a book with M. Jane Fulton, entitled Health Care in Canada: A Description and Analysis of Canadian Health Services. In 1974, he bought 460 acres of property outside Plevna, Ontario. He died in Perth, Ontario in 2023.

- "Professor Ralph William Sutherland MPH, MD", FamilySearch
