= Kenson =

Kenson may refer to:

- River Kenson, a river of South Wales
- Steve Kenson (born 1969), writer and designer of fantasy role-playing games and related fiction
- Kenson Park, a neighborhood in Ottawa, Canada
- Kenson Lee, visual artist and composer previously part of Wong Fu Productions
