= Tom McDougall =

Canadian lawyer and politician (1942–2019)

Ottawa Alderman
- In office January 1, 1970 – December 31, 1972
- Preceded by: John Powers
- Succeeded by: Rhéal Robert
- Constituency: Rideau Ward

Ottawa Controller
- In office September 5, 1972 – December 31, 1974
- Preceded by: Claude Bennett
- Succeeded by: Marion Dewar, Don Reid, Bill Law

Personal details
- Born: 1942 Ottawa
- Died: August 5, 2019 (aged 76–77) Ottawa
- Party: Liberal Party of Canada
- Spouse: Suzanne Panet (m. 1969)
- Children: 3

Thomas Andrew McDougall QC (1942 - August 5, 2019) was a Canadian lawyer and politician. He was an alderman on Ottawa City Council from 1970 to 1972 and was a member of the Ottawa Board of Control from 1972 to 1974. He unsuccessfully ran for mayor of Ottawa in 1974.

== Early life ==
McDougall was born in Ottawa to Thomas Frederick Kenny McDougall and Christina Pauline Stuart McNaughton. McDougall was educated at Lisgar Collegiate Institute, Carleton University, and attended law school at the University of Ottawa and Osgoode Hall.

== Political career ==
McDougall first ran for office in the 1969 Ottawa municipal election in Rideau Ward, citing a "need for restructuring of our municipal government with a view to reducing its present cost and complexity". His platform also consisted of "[i]mproved long-term planning ... in transportation, air and water pollution and urban development." On election day, McDougall won a seat on city council, finishing in second place in the two-seat ward. In his term as alderman, McDougall spearheaded the creation of an air and water anti-pollution committee, of which he was made chairman. Soon after, he was accused of overstepping his authority as chairman after seeking to investigate effluent into the Ottawa River by the E. B. Eddy Company plant across the river in Hull, Quebec, outside the city's jurisdiction.

Following the announcement of the retirement of George McIlraith, McDougall entered the race for the Liberal nomination in Ottawa Centre for the 1972 Canadian federal election. McDougall lost the nomination to Hugh Poulin on the third ballot, 728 votes to 667. Poulin went on to win the seat in the October federal election.

On September 5, 1972, McDougall was elected to the Ottawa Board of Control, defeating his ward counterpart, Des Bender after a 10-9 council vote. The seat had been vacated when Claude Bennett had to resign due to a new provincial law prohibiting individuals from sitting on a municipal council and in the Legislative Assembly of Ontario, which Bennett had won election to in 1971. McDougall opted to run for a full-time spot on the board in the 1972 Ottawa municipal election. McDougall campaigned on not increasing taxes, "even if it means cutting back on some programs". He also continued to support a single-tier municipal government in the region, and an injection of federal and provincial funds to solve the city's water pollution problems. He also supporter an early start on rapid transit, and the preservation of the character and integrity of older neighbourhoods, but also avoid concentrating low-rental housing in large developments. In the election, McDougall finished in third spot on the four-seat board, electing him to a position. As a member of the board of control, he was involved in a number of controversial issues as chairman of the organization and procedures committee. He was responsible for new election expenses legislation, and new controls of the taxi industry.

After sitting on the Board of Control for 2 years, McDougall opted to run for mayor in the 1974 Ottawa municipal election against fellow controller Lorry Greenberg. Both McDougall and Greenberg ran on similar platforms, but were divided on transit, which became the focal point of the campaign. McDougall supported rapid transit, while Greenberg preferred improved bus service, including exclusive busways and bus-only lanes. McDougall also campaigned on "[g]etting (the) board of control to function as a unit", environmental concerns, and opposed arterial roads being built through Vanier and Britannia. On election day, Greenberg defeated McDougall by less than 5,000 votes.

== Post defeat ==
After his defeat, McDougall got more involved in Liberal Party politics. He was the campaign manager for Gerald Kirby, the Liberal candidate in Ottawa Centre in the 1975 Ontario general election. He also ran the Eastern Ontario campaign for Albert Roy's bid in the 1976 Ontario Liberal Party leadership election. In 1976, he ran for the federal Liberal Party nomination in the riding Ottawa—Carleton, which was having a by-election due to the resignation of John Turner. McDougall lost the nomination to Henri Rocque on the third ballot, 1026 votes to 706. Rocque went on to lose the by-election to Tory Jean Pigott.

McDougall mostly stayed out of politics after that, except for a stint as John Manley's senior campaign fundraiser for his aborted campaign in the 2003 Liberal Party of Canada leadership election.

== Legal career ==
Outside of politics, McDougall was a high profile international arbitration, litigation, and business lawyer in the city. He was chairman emeritus and founding partner of Perley-Robertson, Hill & McDougall. In 2015, he won the Ottawa International Arbitration "Lawyer of the Year" award. He was a member of the County of Carleton Law Association, an Honorary Member of the Canadian Bar Association, was a Life Member of the Law Society of Upper Canada and was member of the Advisory Committee on Judicial Appointments for the Government of Canada.
