= Pat Nicol =

Canadian municipal politician in Ottawa

Patricia (Pat) Nicol

Ottawa Alderman
- In office January 1, 1975 – December 31, 1976
- Preceded by: Walter Ryan
- Succeeded by: Roly Wall
- Constituency: Elmdale-Victoria Ward

Ottawa Controller
- In office January 1, 1977 – December 1, 1978
- Preceded by: Garry Guzzo, Bill Law
- Succeeded by: Brian Bourns, Bill Law

Personal details
- Born: March 23, 1935 Ottawa
- Died: October 20, 2023 (aged 88)
- Party: Liberal Party of Canada
- Spouse: Robert John Nicol (m. 1956; d. 2006)
- Children: 4

Patricia Marilyn Nicol (née Ready; March 23, 1935 – October 20, 2023) was a Canadian politician, developer, television commentator and newspaper columnist. She served as an alderman on Ottawa City Council from 1975 to 1976, and on the Ottawa Board of Control from 1977 to 1978. Considered to be on the "extreme right end" of the political spectrum at city hall, she was known for her "fiery speaking style" and her divisiveness led her to stand "alone... against the rest of city council on big issues". She was also known for her political rivalry with Ottawa's left leaning mayor, Marion Dewar, whom she ran against twice for Ottawa's top job.

== Early life ==
Nicol was born and raised in Elmdale-Victoria Ward in Ottawa, the daughter of Catholic farmer Thomas P. Ready and Hilda Margaret Waters. She grew up in a large, poor family in the Westboro neighbourhood during the Depression. She was taught as a child that "anything (she) wanted was there to go after". Nicol attended Immaculata High School, and married Robert John Nicol in 1951 after graduating. Their first home was an apartment above a supermarket at the corner of Beech Street and Loretta Avenue, in the city's Civic Hospital neighbourhood.

Nicol's first career was as a public servant in the department of finance, and as a clerk at the Ottawa Civic Hospital, but she stopped working to raise a family. Prior to her entry into politics, she was active in a parent teachers' association and in local community associations, and was a housewife.

== Political career ==
Nicol first ran for office in the 1972 Ottawa municipal election, running for alderman in Elmdale-Victoria Ward. She ran on a platform of improving communications between city hall and the people, and to have a lawyer available to interpret city by-laws for free for the public. She supported building an arena and a community centre in her ward, encouraged opportunities for youth programs, re-establish local health clinics in the ward, a new day-care centre, better snow removal, road maintenance and supported a rapid transit system. In the election, she placed third, with just over 1400 votes, losing by over 1100 votes to Walter Ryan.

Following Ryan's retirement as alderman, Nicol ran again for the seat in the 1974 Ottawa municipal election. Running on a platform of improved rapid transit, curbing urban sprawl and more recreational and daycare facilities in the ward, she won the seat, defeating three male candidates, including former alderman Rolly Wall in the process. At the time of her election, Nicol was active in the Liberal Party, and was on the executive of the Ottawa and District Liberal Association. During her time as alderman, she claimed to have "served on more committees and had a better attendance record than any other city councillor", and she "looked after her ward like a mother hen, fighting to keep citizens groups happy and fulfil her campaign promises". She gave herself credit for the approval of the Tom Brown Arena in Mechanicsville, the completion the "Ottawa Wset Plan" and the designation of Hintonburg for neighbourhood improvement grants. On council, she voted with the "right wing" bloc and was criticized as being the "developer's voice" due to her husband's job as a building contractor and her brother-in-law being the head of Tartan Development Ltd.

Instead of running for re-election in her ward, Nicol opted to run for a seat on the Ottawa Board of Control in the 1976 Ottawa municipal election. Nicol ran on a "business sense" platform of reducing taxes by elimination some duplication in the various levels of government, stripping all regional government departments except planning, transportation and social services, increasing aid to employables spent on retraining programs. She was also opposed to the 'overbuilding' of roads which she felt disrupted communities. In the election, Nicol won a seat on the board, placing third on the four-seat group. The election was the start of a rivalry with the more left wing Marion Dewar, deputy mayor of Ottawa, who won re-election to the Board of Control, winning the top spot. The two had been "embroiled in pre-election tangles". During her time as a controller, Nicol was known for her "quick temper", but also her "political smarts". She would often get into arguments with her colleagues but "usually (didn't) lose". Nicol was fiercely opposed to the Board's planned abolition, and was one of only two councillors to oppose a motion for its abolition in a 1977 vote. Nicol sat as chairman of the city's procedures committee before resigning in 1977, after holding a press conference to accuse several aldermen of "deliberately circumventing established procedure to achieve their goals".

Following the retirement of mayor Lorry Greenberg, Nicol opted to run for the city's top job in the 1978 Ottawa municipal election, rather than contest the Liberal nomination in the 1978 federal by-election in Ottawa Centre. She ran because she felt the feeling of frustration with "inefficient municipal government ... is widespread". She believed she was speaking on behalf of the 'little guy', be they the small-business man thwarted by bureaucracy, or the tax-payer "choking on the hypocrisy of 'do-gooders'". During the campaign, she was called a "dragon lady" live on-air by news anchor Ab Douglas of CBOT, who thought his microphone was off. Nicol ran against her political rival, deputy mayor Marion Dewar, known for her ties to the social democratic New Democratic Party. The campaign was considered a "hard-fought battle", with Nicol driving the "city council's left wing into a fury with her partisan shots". On election day, Dewar defeated Nicol by nearly 20,000 votes.

Citing public dissatisfaction with Dewar, Nicol announced in August 1980 that she would run against the mayor in the 1980 Ottawa municipal election in a re-match of the 1978 race. She accused Dewar of "indecisive leadership", "(failing) to bring more industry and jobs to Ottawa", and not "(balancing) expensive reforms with economic growth". Nicol decided to change her image for her 1980 mayoral run, running as a "new person with a low-key, more positive style", claiming that she was "being herself" this time. She had cited that once of the possible reasons what she lost in 1978 was that she was not being herself. Indeed, the Dewar-Nicol race of 1980 was less contentious than their 1978 battle, with Nicol running more a more centrist campaign. One of her main attacks was accusing the Dewar administration of inefficient management, bringing up the example of the city taking too long to pick a site for a new police station, which was also over budget. Among her promises in 1980 were bringing "businesslike leadership" to the mayor's chair, seeking government assistance to build an industrial park, more flights to Ottawa, building a bridge across the Rideau River at Hunt Club Road, and better daycare for working mothers. Her new image barely made a dent in Dewar's margins however, as Nicol lost to her by over 16,000 votes.

== Post politics ==
Nicol was a delegate for John Turner at the 1984 Liberal Party of Canada leadership election.

Following her political career, Nicol would become the vice-president of her husband's company, R.J. Nicol Construction (1975) Ltd., which built thousands of homes, government buildings, churches, high rises, schools and non-profit units in the Ottawa region. However, in April 1993, three creditors successfully petitioned in court to have the company declared bankrupt. During the hearing, Nicol was twice cited for contempt of court, and her lawyer quit after a public argument in the middle of the trial. In response to a reporter asking her about the judge commenting that the company had been run "willy nilly", Nicol responded "If I accused you of being a real little slut, does that mean you are? Does it, does it?" The hearing meant that the company would no longer be owned by her family. In December 1993, the last of their business holdings, R.J. Nicol Homes Ltd. and R.J. Nicol Construction were forced into bankruptcy by a petition brought by the Royal Bank of Canada. As part of the bankruptcy, sheriff's officers seized Nicol's clothing from her Island Park residence, including underpants, bras, nylons, shoes, and reading glasses. They even seized Christmas presents and a teddy bear, plus her husband's medical records and prescriptions. In a final blow to the family, an Ontario court judge ruled in 1996 that the Royal Bank could repossess their home on Island Park. In 1998, there was a further blow to the family, when their bankrupt company and the Royal Bank (RBC) lost a class-action lawsuit which stated that R.J. Nicol Homes Ltd. breached contractual obligations to former golf course members and that RBC benefited as a result. The judge ordered R.J. Nicol Homes Ltd. to pay $5,000 to each of the 169 members in punitive damages, though it was doubtful they would be able to pay.
