= Brian Bourns =

Canadian politician

Ottawa Alderman
- In office 1975–1978
- Preceded by: Joe Cassey
- Succeeded by: Joe Cassey
- Constituency: Wellington Ward

Ottawa Controller
- In office 1978–1980
- Preceded by: Marion Dewar, Donald Bartlett Reid, Pat Nicol
- Succeeded by: Position abolished

Ottawa Alderman
- In office 1980–1985
- Preceded by: Joe Quinn
- Succeeded by: Joan O'Neill
- Constituency: Billings Ward

Personal details
- Born: 1951 (age 74–75) Deep River, Ontario
- Party: New Democratic Party
- Spouse: Donna Holtom
- Children: Owen, Evan and Gordon (adopted; wife's nephew)

Brian V. Bourns (born 1951) is a former Canadian politician. He was an Ottawa City Councillor from 1975 to 1985, serving on the city's Board of Control from 1978 to 1980 before it was abolished.

== Early life ==
Bourns was born in Deep River, Ontario, where he attended Mackenzie High School. He went to university in Waterloo, Ontario, where he dropped out of a math program after receiving a scholarship. Afterward, he worked in Labrador City for the Iron Ore Company. He moved to Ottawa in 1971. Before entering politics, Bourns was a journalist working as the co-editor for the city's "counter-culture" newspaper, A Usually Reliable Source and as a writer/salesman for The Centre Town News. Bourns first ran for office in the 1972 municipal election for a spot on the city's Board of Control. He ran on a platform of replacing the property tax system with an income tax, changes in zoning by-laws, and the closing of establishments which profit from the exploitation of sex, the cancellation of the Central Canada Exhibition's lease at Lansdowne Park and a fully subsidized rapid transit system. Bourns ended up finishing in last place in his bid, with just under 4,000 votes. After losing, Bourns worked on the Centretown development plan, becoming the head of the Centretown citizens' planning committee. The goals of the committee included increasing residential building in the neighbourhood, and to make it "a better place to live".

== First term ==
Bourns ran again in the 1974 municipal election for Wellington Ward alderman, a seat which was opened up by Joe Cassey who was running for a seat on the Board of Control. He ran on a reform platform, advocating for the creation of non-profit housing, adequate day-care, recreation facilities and more greenspace in Downtown Ottawa. At just 23 years old, Bourns won the seat in a surprise victory, winning the seat with 45% of the vote, defeating Matthew McGrath, who finished in second place with 32% of the vote.

After being elected, Bourns ran for a spot on the city's executive committee, but lost by two votes in what was seen as a "setback for an informal alliance of reform (members of council)". In 1976, he resigned from five organizations (including the Centretown Citizens' Corp.) he was a member of to avoid being caught in a conflict of interest. Bourns ran for re-election in the 1976 municipal election on a platform of "[s]tabilizing the ward socially and economically." He called for a freeze on the development of new office complexes until the federal government can agree on the direction in growth in the ward. He was opposed by law and order candidate John Rankin and perennial candidate Sam McLean, a businessman who criticized Bourns' "left-wing leanings", calling him a "goddamn commie". Bourns easily defeated his conservative challengers, winning 70% of the vote in an election which saw city council shift to the left.

== Second term ==
After his re-election, Bourns was elected to the city's planning committee. He was also appointed to the Regional Municipality of Ottawa-Carleton's planning and transportation committees. On January 21, 1978, Bourns married city hall staffer Donna Holtom in Dunrobin. When he was first elected to council, Bourns was seen as a thorn in the side of developers and the city's downtown business committee. However, Bourns worked with businesses to help revitalize Bank Street, the city's main downtown thoroughfare. In 1978, Bourns ran for a spot on the city's Board of Control in that year's municipal election. Bourns ran a more conservative campaign compared to the "radical" campaigns of his past. He ran on a campaign promoting "fiscal responsibility", with a desire to keep tax-rate increases below the rate of inflation, and skepticism toward expensive capital ventures, which he believed were being promoted by city council's right wing. Bourns was elected to the Board of control, finishing in second place with over 35,000 votes. After the election, Bourns' wife was appointed as the executive assistant to mayor Marion Dewar, which some aldermen complained was a conflict of interest. Bourns, whose spot on council also made him a regional councillor supported Rideau Township's Bill Tupper for Regional Chair of Ottawa-Carleton, whose bid lost to Andrew S. Haydon.

== Controller ==
During his first term on the Board of Control, while he continued to develop contacts in the business community, Bourns continued to fight for the same principles as earlier in his career, such as for social services and better public transit, and kept a keen interest in his former ward, supporting revitalizing the downtown core. City council voted to abolish the board of control in 1979 (whose abolition Bourns supported), so Bourns ran for a spot on city council instead, opting to run in the new suburban Billings Ward. Bourns lived in Dalhousie Ward at the time, but did not want to run against incumbent Rolf Hasenack, who he believed was doing a good job. Bourns won the seat with 41% of the vote, defeating conservative motel owner Bill Zlepnig who won 34% and Ottawa Board of Education trustee Geraldine Trudel who won 25%. After his election, Bourns was elected chairman of the city's planning board.

== Final term ==
In 1981, Bourns was named "man of the year" by the Ottawa JayCees for his work with the Special Olympics. During his first term as the alderman for Billings, he worked with South Keys residents to persuade developers to reduce the number of townhouses proposed in the neighbourhood. He also helped improve Pushman Park, recreation facilities and opened a day care centre in the ward. These measures he claimed reduced vandalism in the ward. He also advocated for the widening of Walkley Road and Heron Road. He continued to advocate for downtown revitalization through his work with the Commercial and Industrial Development Corporation. Bourns was once again opposed by Zlepnig, who this time received the endorsement of Geraldine Trudel, who finished third in 1980. The endorsement did not help Zlepnig however, as Bourns went on to defeat Zlepnig with 55% of the vote to Zlepnig's 45%. After his re-election, Bourns ran for re-election as chair of the planning board, but there was an 8–8 tie in the council vote with Graham Bird. A compromise gave Bird the job for the first half of the council's 1982–1985 term, and Bourns the second half. In 1983, he lost his bid for re-election as the region's transportation committee chairman.

Bourns was rumoured as a possible NDP candidate in the 1985 Ontario general election, but decided against it. He was also considered likely to run for mayor in the 1985 municipal election, but decided against it, citing a desire to spend time with his family, his side-career as a business consultant and getting a master's degree in business administration from the University of Ottawa. In August 1985, he announced he would not be running for re-election as alderman either and endorsed fellow progressive alderman Marlene Catterall in the mayoral race. During his time on council, he was "instrumental" in getting Ottawa's non-profit housing corporation "City Living" started, and played a "major role" in developing Ottawa's Transitway rapid bus network as chair of the region's transportation committee. Bourns was succeeded on council by his executive assistant Joan O'Neill who defeated Zlepnig who ran for the seat once again.

== Post political life ==
On November 21, 1985, Bourns and his wife opened up the "Sussex Club", a women-only health spa located at 45 Rideau Street. In 1987, he was again rumoured to run for the NDP in Ottawa South for the Ontario general election, 1987, but opted against it. After politics, he continued his consulting work with a firm that dealt with native issues. He received his MBA and became a financial analyst for Peat Marwick Thorne, helping companies in financial trouble. At this time, he was urged to run for Regional Chair in the 1991 municipal elections (the first direct election for the job), but ultimately did not do so. In 1993, while working as an accountant for KPMG, he was appointed by the provincial government to study the possible amalgamation of the region's five school boards. His report ultimately rejected board amalgamation (though the regions's two school boards would eventually be amalgamated in 1998).

Today, Bourns is the founder of Maclaren Municipal Consulting. The Brian Bourns Place apartments in Centretown are named in his honour.
