= Kenson Park =

- Neighbourhood
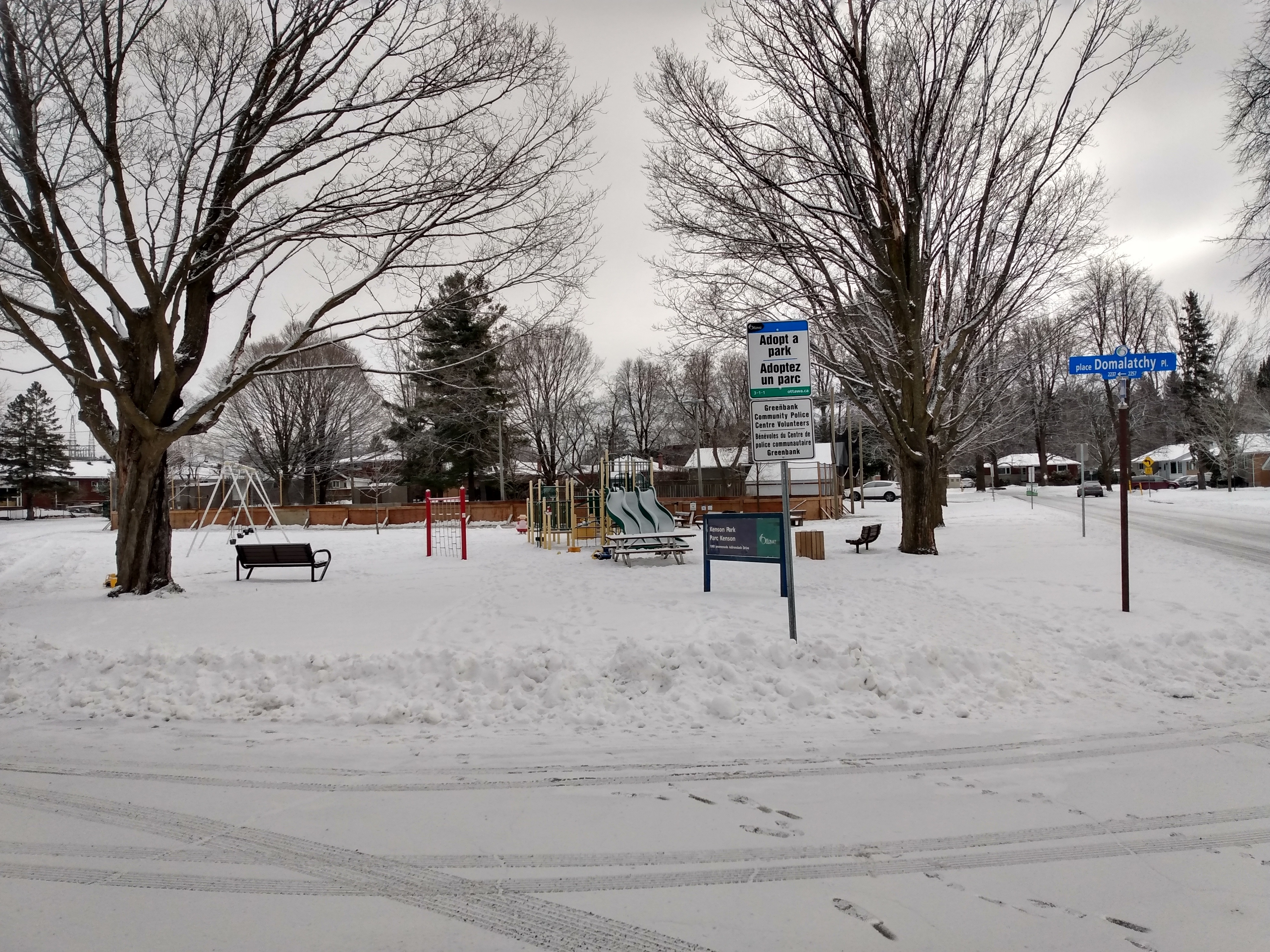
- Kenson Park

- Location in Ottawa
- Coordinates: 45.356428°N 75.768334°W
- Country: Canada
- Province: Ontario
- City: Ottawa

Government
  - MPs: Anita Vandenbeld
  - MPPs: Chandra Pasma
  - Councillors: Laine Johnson
  - Governing body: Kenson Park Community Association
  - President: Matthew McBain

Area
  - Total: 0.32 km^{2} (0.12 sq mi)
- Elevation: 80 m (260 ft)

Population (2016)
  - Total: 429
  - Density: 1,300/km^{2} (3,500/sq mi)
- Canada 2016 Census
- Time zone: UTC−5 (Eastern (EST))
  - Summer (DST): UTC−4 (EDT)
- Forward sortation area: K2C
- Website: Community Association

Kenson Park is a neighbourhood located in College Ward in the west end of Ottawa, Ontario, Canada. It's bounded to the east by Woodroffe Avenue, to the north highway 417, to the south Baseline Road, and to the west "past Adirondack Drive". The population for this area, according to the Canada 2016 Census was 429.

The neighbourhood was built in the late 1950s by Kenson Construction Co. Ltd. and sold by Mervin Greenberg Realtors. The area south of Iris Street was built first (before 1958), while the area north of Iris was built soon after.

The neighbourhood features Kenson Park, which is located on Adirondack Drive. Iris Street runs through the neighbourhood. Iris Bus Station is a short distance away from the neighbourhood as well as the NCC bike path.
