= Rick Chiarelli =

Canadian Politician

Ottawa City Councillor
- In office January 1, 2001 – November 15, 2022
- Preceded by: Brian Mackey
- Succeeded by: Laine Johnson
- Constituency: College Ward (2006-present); Baseline Ward (2001-2006)

Nepean City Councillor
- In office 1988–1991
- Preceded by: Al Brown
- Succeeded by: Shayna Shuster
- Constituency: Borden Ward

Nepean City Councillor
- In office 1994–2000
- Constituency: Nepean Centre Ward

Carleton Roman Catholic Separate School Board Trustee Serving with Basil MacDonald, Mel Thompson and Hans Haigeler
- In office 1982–1985
- Preceded by: Yvonne O'Neill, Mary Haydon, Joe Mangione
- Succeeded by: Sylvia Bredson
- Constituency: Nepean

Personal details
- Born: c. 1964
- Party: Independent
- Other political affiliations: Ontario Liberal Party
- Spouse: Lida Chiarelli (née Fiala)
- Children: 3
- Profession: Politician

Richard "Rick" Chiarelli (born c. 1964) is a politician in Ontario, Canada. He was an Ottawa City Councillor, and is the second cousin of former Ottawa mayor and 2022 mayoral candidate Bob Chiarelli. He represented the College Ward covering part of Nepean and Ottawa's west end. On council, Chiarelli was known for being an "independent voice, often voicing dissent on issues his fellow councillors support" and now for "offensive and disreputable behaviour" and "incomprehensible incidents of harassment" against staff. He was for a time the longest serving municipal politician on Ottawa's city council.

== Early years ==
Chiarelli grew up in the Qualicum-Graham Park neighbourhood of Nepean, and has lived in Nepean his whole life. His father owned a real estate agency and a restaurant and co-started Ottawa/Algonquin Travel with Lowell Green, while his mother was a homemaker.

At age 16, while attending St. Pius X High School in Ottawa, Chiarelli formed the Ontario Students Alliance for Fair Funding (OSAFF) to fight for the equality that was promised in the Canadian Constitution. At this time, Ontario’s separate schools were funded only to grade 10. Beyond this, a high school student was required to pay substantial tuition fees.

Chiarelli began to speak at hundreds of schools and the OSAFF quickly grew to over 70,000 members across Ontario.

OSAFF launched a legal challenge against the Government of Ontario’s treatment of separate schools and convinced Ian Scott, a prominent Canadian lawyer, to represent them in court. The action was timed to coincide with the visit to the Premier by Pope John Paul II. The court imposed deadlines on the Province to file its full defence to the action. As a result, Premier Bill Davis announced a change in the Province’s century old policy and granted full funding to separate schools. The case was unanimously won by OSAFF 9-0 at the Supreme Court of Canada.

During OSAFF’s legal challenge, at the age of 19, Chiarelli ran for school trustee of the Carleton Separate School Board and won in the 1982 elections. This resulted in Chiarelli becoming the youngest ever elected official in the province.

Chiarelli has a law degree from the University of Ottawa, but is not a member of the Law Society of Ontario. He also has a Communications and Economics Degree.

== City Council ==
At the age of 22, Chiraelli ran for a seat on the council of the Regional Municipality of Ottawa–Carleton in the 1985 elections, but lost by nearly 2,000 votes.

In the 1988 municipal election, he was elected to the Nepean City Council for the Borden Ward. In the 1991 municipal election, he once again ran for a seat on regional council, but lost by 500 votes. He ran for election on Nepean City Council in 1994 in the newly created Nepean Centre Ward and was re-elected by acclamation in 1997. While on Nepean City Council, he briefly served as acting mayor of the city. On September 17, 1998, Chiarelli won the Ontario Liberal Party nomination for the new riding of Ottawa West—Nepean for the 1999 Ontario general election. Chiarelli defeated sitting Liberal MPP Alex Cullen, who was an "outspoken and independent minded MPP" and would later cross the floor to join the NDP in his defeat. Chiarelli would go on to lose the election to Progressive Conservative Gary Guzzo.

The 2000 municipal election in November was the first for the about-to-be amalgamated City of Ottawa. Chiarelli, who had been a leading opponent of amalgamation, faced long-time Councillor Al Loney in what was thought would be one of the tightest election battles of the year. Chiarelli prevailed by nearly 2,000 votes, and became councillor for Baseline Ward. In 2003, Chiarelli was re-elected by acclamation. In 2006, after ward boundary changes, Chiarelli faced a challenge from cycling activist Brett Delmage in the newly created College Ward. Chiarelli won by a wide majority, securing 73% of the votes. He won despite criticisms that he appeared to be "bored with his job", and sometimes slept at council meetings. His campaign focused on improving police and fire services in his ward and a desire to keep property tax increases to a minimum. During his time on council, he voted against expanding Ottawa's north-south light rail plan and served as chairman of the Ottawa Public Library Board. He was easily re-elected in 2010 running on a campaign of wanting to "keep taxes down" and having council focus on "'core' services", as well as his work with the plan to redevelop Lansdowne Park, improving Centrepointe Town Centre and the launch of the Bells Corners business Improvement association. He was again easily re-elected in 2014, an election which made him the longest serving city councillor (including his time on Nepean council). During the campaign, he spoke out against illegal rooming house conversions and his ward becoming a "party scene" student ghetto for Algonquin College. Chiarelli faced tougher competition in 2018, defeating lawyer Emilie Coyle by 1,300 votes. Voters in the ward had called for renewal of city facilities and infrastructure and student housing. Chiarelli campaigned on maintaining roads and infrastructure in the short-term.

Chiarelli did not run in the 2022 municipal election.

== Alleged harassment of staff and police investigation ==
Beginning in September 2019, several former employees have come forward with allegations of inappropriate statements in the Councillor's office. Two complaints concerned Chiarelli asking female staffers if they were comfortable not wearing a bra and one of the women recalled during her interview how Chiarelli described revealing outfits worn by others and asked her what her thoughts were about wearing shirts that showed the side of a woman's breasts. Also, five women claimed they heard Chiarelli making inappropriate comments in the workplace, including a joke repeatedly told about "needing to sanitize one of the office desks because a former employee had had sex on it with another councillor". According to an official complaint filed by someone who interviewed for a position at Chiarelli's office - and an unnamed source contacted by CBC News - Chiarelli described a strategy for signing up volunteers by having women from his office go to bars and flirt and drink with men in order to pressure them into volunteering at the Councillor's office. The complainant said Chiarelli did not explicitly tell her that her job offer was conditional on her willingness to go to bars and flirt with men or on her willingness to not wear a bra and said it wasn't clear if she'd be pressured to do those things once she got the job. By October 23 a total of 13 women had come forward with allegations concerning inappropriate behaviour and comments made by Chiarelli, including asking women to not wear bras to functions.

In response, Chiarelli issued a statement denying all the allegations: "This situation has reached a level of seriousness, and has adopted what I can only describe as an apparent ‘mob-mentality’ approach to the inaccurate characterization of past events, where I need to write this to step forward and defend my good name, reputation, and three decades of public service, irrespective of any potential adverse health consequences". In October, Chiarelli threatened to seek a judicial review to stop the Integrity Commissioner from looking into the complaints on the grounds that the Commissioner was exceeding his power, while also accusing the City of bias against him throughout the investigation. No such action ended up being taken at that time, though he ended up filing the request for a judicial review in July 2020 as the first of two reports was about to be published.

The first of two reports by the City's Integrity Commissioner was published in July 2020 after a ten- month-long investigation of three complaints. He recommended Chiarelli's pay be suspended for ten months at a value of more than $79,000. The breakdown was three months for each of the complaints added back-to-back, which is the harshest possible punishment for the allegations. The Commissioner recommended the sanctions against Chiarelli for his "offensive and disreputable behaviour [which] has been going on for a very long time...". The Commissioner found that Chiarelli's behaviour qualified as harassment under the City's policies by "...exploit[ing] the power dynamic of the situation, in which the Respondent held out the possibility of employment, to sexualize the discussion and questions in a manner that was upsetting and unacceptable" and that "such a comportment by an elected public office holder deeply harms the public interest and seriously damages the trust covenant with the citizens who elect them". By the end of the month, City Council voted to implement the recommended 270-day pay suspension, at the maximum allowed ceiling of 90 days per incident. Chiarelli filed for judicial review of the Commissioner's report as well as the Council-imposed suspension, alleging that they were biased against him.

On November 20, 2020 the second report was published and recommended Chiarelli be removed from all committees and have an additional six month's pay withheld for "incomprehensible incidents of harassment" against staff. On November 25, city council voted unanimously to impose the recommended sanctions on Chiarelli and also demanded his immediate resignation.

On December 4, 2020 it was reported that following the City's Integrity Commissioner referring information from his investigation to the appropriate authorities, the Ontario Provincial Police were investigating Chiarelli.

On September 2, 2021, Chicago-based comedian Cassidy Kulhanek posted publicly to her Twitter account alleging that Chiarelli had invited her on "a vaguely sexual trip to Europe using state funds," including various screenshots of messages Chiarelli had sent her over the course of several days. Kulhanek, who did not know of Chiarelli before receiving his messages, learned from a friend about his prior allegations and then decided to entertain herself by responding to him. In response to Kulhanek's post, several additional women came forward revealing inappropriate messages they received from Chiarelli. The Councillor's official response is that his twitter was hacked, despite being used to tweet in an official capacity about the city of Ottawa at the same time as these messages occurred.

On December 22, 2021, the Ontario Divisional Court ruled on Chiarelli's application for judicial review in respect to the July 2020 report and suspension. It found that the City Integrity Commissioner had reasonably accommodated Chiarelli's medical needs and had not been biased. The court granted Chiarelli's application against City Council because several councillors and Mayor Jim Watson had made public statements against Chiarelli, including some saying that they believed the allegations, before the suspension vote, meaning that they had not approached the vote in their adjudication capacity with an open mind. However, the court found that Chiarelli's request that he not be suspended and be protected from future suspensions was inappropriate given the clear evidence of his misconduct, and imposed the maximum sentence available, a judicial 270-day suspension in place of the City's. Chiarelli was ordered to pay the Commissioner $40,000 in legal costs and the City was ordered to pay Chiarelli $20,000 in legal costs.

On November 4, 2022, the City's Integrity Commissioner published a third report on Chiarelli, finding that he had used the power he held as an employer to bully and harass a younger female staffer who worked in his office from 2013 to 2015 in violation of the Council's Code of Conduct. The report found on a balance of probabilities that two complaints by the staffer were substantiated: that Chiarelli had ordered her to change into a sheer outfit for an event, and that Chiarelli had offered to pay her to perform sexual acts on men she picked up in nightclubs after he drove her to Montreal. Two other complaints were not substantiated and one was outside the Commissioner's jurisdiction because it allegedly occurred before the Code of Conduct came into effect in 2013. Chiarelli had denied all the allegations. The report recommend that Chiarelli's pay be suspended for 90 days and that he should make a public apology.

== Personal life ==
Rick Chiarelli is a second cousin of former Mayor Bob Chiarelli. Chiarelli is married to Lida and has three daughters. They live in the Lynwood neighbourhood of Bells Corners. He had heart surgery in December 2019.

== Election results ==
Results:

2018 Ottawa municipal election
College Ward
Council candidate	Vote	%
Rick Chiarelli	7,079	46.79
Emilie Coyle	5,751	38.01
Ryan Kennery	2,299	15.20

2014 Ottawa municipal election
College Ward
Council candidate	Vote	%
Rick Chiarelli	9,601	70.39
Guy Annable	2,084	15.28
Craig MacAulay	1,065	7.81
Scott Andrew McLarens	889	6.52

2010 Ottawa municipal election
College Ward
Council candidate	Vote	%
Rick Chiarelli	10,531	65.54
Lynn Hamilton	2,367	14.73
Julia Ringma	1,139	7.09
Catherine Gardner	606	3.77
Ralph Anderson	513	3.19
John Campbell	423	2.63
William McKinnon	249	1.55
Craig MacAulay	239	1.49

2006 Ottawa municipal election
College Ward (Ward 8)
Candidate	Votes	%
Rick Chiarelli	13,761	72.59%
Brett Delmage	3,765	19.86%
Laura Lee Doupe	1,432	7.55%
Source(s) "2006 Municipal Election Results". City of Ottawa. Archived from the original on 2010-10-29.

2003 Ottawa municipal election
Baseline Ward (Ward 8)
Candidate	Votes	%
Rick Chiarelli	ACCLAIMED	
Source(s) "2003 Municipal Election Results". City of Ottawa. Archived from the original on 2010-10-29.

2000 Ottawa municipal election
Baseline Ward (Ward 8)
Candidate	Votes	%
Rick Chiarelli	5,738	59.67
Al Loney	3,879	40.33

1999 Ontario general election: Ottawa West—Nepean
Party	Candidate	Votes	%	Expenditures
Progressive Conservative	Garry Guzzo	22,834	47.79	$ 52,524.00
Liberal	Rick Chiarelli	16,419	34.36	69,057.01
New Democratic	Alex Cullen	7,701	16.12	32,467.74
Green	Richard Warman	453	0.95	0.00
Independent	Megan Hnatiw	129	0.27	0.00
Independent	John Turmel	94	0.20	0.00
Confederation of Regions	Anthony C. Silvestro	79	0.17	806.00
Natural Law	Lester J. Newby	70	0.15	0.00
Total valid votes/expense limit		47,779	100.0	$ 78,526.08
Total rejected ballots		393	0.82	
Turnout		48,172	58.89	
Eligible voters		81,798		
Source(s) "General Election of June 3 1999 – Summary of Valid Ballots by Candidate". Elections Ontario. "General Election of June 3 1999 – Statistical Summary". "1999 Candidate and Constituency Associations – Candidate Campaign Return (CR-1)".

1997 Nepean municipal election
Nepean Centre Ward
Council candidate	Vote	%
Rick Chiarelli	Acclaimed	

1994 Nepean municipal election
Nepean Centre Ward
Council candidate	Vote	%
Rick Chiarelli	3,202	51.70
Beth Graham	2,840	45.86
Jim Wisking	151	2.44

1991 Nepean municipal election
Ottawa-Carleton Regional Council
Council candidate	Vote	%
Three to be elected
Gord Hunter	16,105	24.43
Al Loney	16,009	24.29
David Pratt	14,947	22.68
Rick Chiarelli	14,592	22.14
Curt Nielson	4,262	6.47

1988 Nepean municipal election
Borden Ward
Council candidate	Vote	%
Rick Chiarelli	2,685	39.97
Margaret Rywak	1,831	27.26
Barbara Bowman	1,753	26.09
Richard Stead	449	6.68

1985 Nepean municipal election
Ottawa-Carleton Regional Council
Council candidate	Vote	%
Three to be elected
Gord Hunter	11,691	24.04
Frank Reid	9,606	20.37
Beryl Gaffney	9,519	19.57
Margaret Ellen Rywak	8,873	18.24
Rick Chiarelli	7,649	15.73
Andrew Dynowski	997	2.05

1982 Carleton Separate School Board election
Nepean
Trustee candidate	Vote	%
Four to be elected
Basil MacDonald	3,903	22.18
Mel Thompson	3,826	22.74
Richard Chiarelli	3,751	21.32
Hans Daigeler*	3,057	17.37
Maurice Walsh*	3,059	17.38

* Daigeler would later win by 8 votes on a recount.
