= College Ward =

College
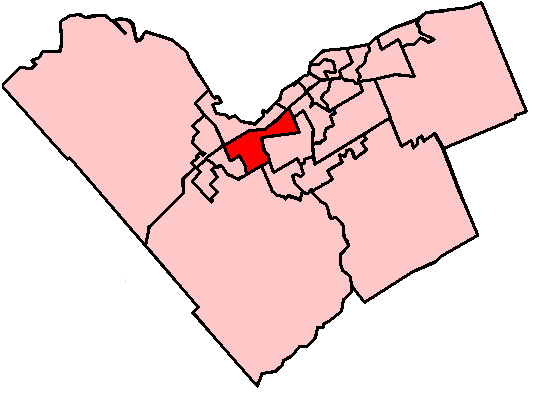
- Location within Ottawa
- Coordinates: 45°20′N 75°49′W
- Country: Canada
- Province: Ontario
- City: Ottawa

Government
  - Councillor: Laine Johnson

Population (2016)Canada 2016 Census
  - Total: 48,665

Languages (2016)
  - English: 71.5%
  - French: 8.3%
  - Arabic: 2.5%
  - Italian: 2.3%
  - Mandarin: 2.1%
  - Cantonese: 1.4%
  - Spanish: 1.2%

College Ward or Ward 8 (French: Quartier Collège) is a city ward in Ottawa, Canada's west end. The ward covers the neighbourhoods of Bells Corners, Qualicum, Graham Park, Leslie Park, Redwood, Kenson Park, Parkway Park, Bel-Air Park, Bel-Air Heights, Braemar Park, Copeland Park, Briargreen, Centrepointe, Navaho, City View, Ryan Farm, Meadowlands and Crestview.

Prior to the 2006 election, College Ward was known as Baseline Ward, and didn't include Bells Corners. It was incorporated into the city with amalgamation in 2001 (elections were held in 2000). Previously, the ward existed on the earlier Ottawa-Carleton Regional Council. The ward is represented on city council by Laine Johnson. The ward has an estimated population of 55,000 (2006) and an area of 46.2 km^{2}. The ward is named for Algonquin College.

Prior to amalgamation, the area now covered by College Ward in Ottawa's west end was in Carleton Ward. It was created in 1950, when Ottawa's west end was annexed from Nepean Township. The ward eventually became smaller and smaller, and by 1972 it only consisted of the area south of the Queensway and west of Clyde Avenue.

== City councillors ==
- Frank Boyce (1950–1958)
- Howard Henry (1950–1969)
- Lloyd Francis (1959–1960)
- Frank Boyce (1961–1964)
- Maurice Egan (1965–1967)
- Lloyd Francis (1968–1969)
- Ralph Sutherland (1970–1972)
- Bill Law (1970–1974)
- Toddy Kehoe (1975–1985)
- Bob Morrison (1985–1988)
- Tim Kehoe (1988–1994)
- Brian Mackey (1994–2000)
- Rick Chiarelli (2001–2022)
- Laine Johnson (2022–present)

== Election results ==
=== 1949 special election ===
Two aldermen elected for the newly created Carleton Ward

City council
Candidate	Votes	%
Frank Boyce	996	34.55
Howard Henry	789	27.37
George Ault	605	20.99
R. E. Denison	493	17.10

=== 1950 ===
Two to be elected

Carleton Ward
Candidate	Votes	%
Frank Boyce	1,952	41.59
Howard Henry (X)	1,882	40.09
William Simpson	860	18.32

=== 1952 ===
Two to be elected

Ward 9
Candidate	Votes	%
Howard Henry	Acclaimed	
Frank Boyce	Acclaimed	

=== 1954 ===
Two to be elected

Ward 9
Candidate	Votes	%
Howard Henry	3,432	33.86
Frank Boyce	2,796	27.59
Don Charboneau	2,671	26.35
George C. Brown	1,236	12.20

=== 1956 ===
Two to be elected

Carleton Ward
Candidate	Votes	%
Howard Henry	3,186	36.93
Frank Boyce	2,487	28.82
Lloyd Francis	2,124	24.62
G. C. Brown	831	9.63

=== 1958 ===
Two to be elected

Carleton Ward
Candidate	Votes	%
Howard Henry	3,965	37.67
Lloyd Francis	3,700	35.15
Frank Boyce	2,861	27.18

=== 1960 ===
Two to be elected

Carleton Ward
Candidate	Votes	%
Howard Henry	8,795	37.05
Frank Boyce	5,777	24.34
Margaret Hamilton	4,756	20.03
Robert Fauknen	4,411	18.58

=== 1962 ===
Two to be elected

Carleton Ward
Candidate	Votes	%
Howard Henry	11,185	43.01
Frank Boyce	9,746	37.48
Brian McNally	5,074	19.51

=== 1964 ===
Two to be elected

Carleton Ward
Candidate	Votes	%
Howard Henry	9,806	37.23
Maurice Egan	8,431	32.01
Frank Boyce	6,142	23.32
Robert Ripley	1,957	7.43

=== 1966 ===
Two to be elected

Carleton Ward
Candidate	Votes	%
Maurice Egan	9,976	47.42
Howard Henry	9,355	44.47
Alfred Lapointe	1,706	8.11

=== 1969 ===
Two to be elected

Carleton Ward
Candidate	Votes	%
Bill Law	6,331	31.29
Ralph Sutherland	5,514	27.25
Ed Mulkins	2,835	14.01
Philip Coulter	2,515	12.43
Charles Strong	1,870	9.24
Alfred Lapointe	1,168	5.77

=== 1972 ===
Carleton Ward
Candidate	Votes	%
Bill Law	4,373	76.95
Ken Read	1,310	23.05

=== 1974 ===
Carleton Ward
Candidate	Votes	%
Toddy Kehoe	1,786	26.89
Mike Moore	1,405	21.15
Alison Bowick	1,289	19.41
Syd Ford	788	11.86
Ted Rickar	770	11.59
Ken Read	604	9.09

=== 1976 ===
Carleton Ward
Candidate	Votes	%
Toddy Kehoe	3,296	59.74
Robbins Elliott	2,221	40.26

=== 1978 ===
Carleton Ward
Candidate	Votes	%
Toddy Kehoe	5,220	69.60
Bill Bangs	2,280	30.40

=== 1980 ===
Carleton Ward
Candidate	Votes	%
Toddy Kehoe	Acclaimed	

=== 1982 ===
Carleton Ward
Candidate	Votes	%
Toddy Kehoe	2,631	36.56
Bob Morrison	2,395	33.28
Barbara Lajeunesse	2,171	30.17

=== 1985 ===
Carleton Ward
Candidate	Votes	%
Bob Morrison	2,377	36.81
Tim Kehoe	2,288	35.43
Barbara Lejeunesse	1,792	27.75

=== 1988 ===
Carleton Ward
Candidate	Votes	%
Tim Kehoe	2,480	49.03
Bob Morrison	1,378	27.24
Mary Nash	1,200	23.72

=== 1991 ===
Carleton Ward
Candidate	Votes	%
Tim Kehoe	3,442	54.93
Jim Bonner	2,824	45.07

=== 1994 ===
Regional council: Ward 8
Candidate	Votes	%
Al Loney	4,269	38.10
Jay Acton	3,595	32.09
Stan McBride	1,748	15.60
Kevin Kinsella	1,592	14.21

1994: Ward 2
Candidate	Votes	%
Brian Mackey	4,206	70.45
Roberta Anderson	1,764	29.55

=== 1997 ===
Regional council: Baseline Ward
Candidate	Votes	%
Al Loney	6,291	64.17
Mike Patton	3,512	35.83

City council: Carleton Ward
Candidate	Votes	%
Brian Mackey	3,552	74.51
Michael O'Byrne	1,215	24.49

=== 2000 ===
Baseline Ward
Candidate	Votes	%
Rick Chiarelli	5,738	59.67
Al Loney	3,879	40.33

=== 2003 ===
Baseline Ward
Candidate	Votes	%
Rick Chiarelli	ACCLAIMED	

=== 2006 ===
Longtime incumbent Rick Chiarelli faced opposition from Brett Delmage a software developer, and activist Laura Lee Doupe.

City council
Candidate	Votes	%
Rick Chiarelli	13,761	72.59
Brett Delmage	3,765	19.86
Laura Lee Doupe	1,432	7.55

=== 2010 ===
City council
Candidate	Votes	%
Rick Chiarelli	10,531	65.54
Lynn Hamilton	2,367	14.73
Julia Ringma	1,139	7.09
Catherine Gardner	606	3.77
Ralph Anderson	513	3.19
John Campbell	423	2.63
William McKinnon	249	1.55
Craig MacAulay	239	1.49

=== 2014 ===
City council
Candidate	Vote	%
Rick Chiarelli	9,601	70.39
Guy Annable	2,084	15.28
Craig MacAulay	1,065	7.81
Scott Andrew McLarens	889	6.52

Ottawa mayor (Ward results)
Candidate	Vote	%
Jim Watson	9,627	74.50
Mike Maguire	2,710	20.97
Rebecca Pyrah	160	1.24
Robert White	112	0.87
Darren W. Wood	104	0.80
Anwar Syed	90	0.70
Bernard Couchman	70	0.54
Michael St. Arnaud	50	0.39

=== 2018 ===
Council candidate	Vote	%
Rick Chiarelli	7,079	46.79
Emilie Coyle	5,751	38.01
Ryan Kennery	2,299	15.20

=== 2022 ===
Council candidate	Vote	%
Laine Johnson	8,899	52.64
Pat McGarry	5,652	33.43
Wendy Davidson	1,338	7.91
Granda Kopytko	649	3.84
Vilteau Delvas	368	2.18

=== 2026 ===
2026 Ottawa municipal election: College
Candidate	Popular vote			Expenditures
Candidate	Votes	%	±%	Expenditures
Laine Johnson (X)	14,327	92.00		
Malloum Abakar	1,245	8.00		
Total valid votes	16,111			
Total rejected, unmarked and declined votes				
Turnout		39.09		
Eligible voters	41,211			
Note: Candidate campaign colours are based on the prominent colour used in campaign items (signs, literature, etc.) and are used as a visual differentiation between candidates.
