= City View, Ottawa =

Neighbourhood in Ontario, Canada

Coordinates: 45°21′12″N 75°44′35″W

City View (also known as St. Claire Gardens) is a neighbourhood in College Ward in the west end of the city of Ottawa, Ontario, Canada. It is located within the former city of Nepean.

Most of the homes in it were built from the 1930s to the 1960s. By the early 2000s some of the home were beginning to be demolished and replaced with in-fill. That has continued into the mid-2020s.

The area existed as a police village from 1954 to 1974. Its boundaries at the time were:

- North: the former Ottawa city limits (parallel to Baseline Road) to the north;
- East: Clyde Avenue until its intersection with Merivale, then east to a line behind the homes on the east side Gibey Dr then south to Capilano Dr then west to Merivale then south to the southern boundary;
- South: Meadowlands Drive
- West: The now in-filled section of Pinecrest creek behind the homes on the west side of Thatcher Street to David Dr and continuing east in a straight line past Withrow Avenue until what is now Lentini Way and then due north along the eastern boundary of what is now Algonquin College.

Due to its older history, the neighbourhood is set up with a grid pattern of streets.

According to the Canada 2011 Census, the population of this area was approximately 3,321. The neighbourhood is right next to Algonquin College, and contains Elizabeth Wynwood High School. It contains a number of small parks; St. Nicholas Park, Starwood Park, City View Park and Doug Frobel Park. The neighbourhood also contains the Nepean Museum. The City View Curling Club is on the other side of Merivale on Capilano Drive.
