= Toddy Kehoe =

Canadian politician (1918–2024)

Ottawa Alderman
- In office January 1, 1975 – November 30, 1985
- Preceded by: Bill Law
- Succeeded by: Bob Morrison
- Constituency: Carleton Ward

Personal details
- Born: Margaret Mary Leore; October 19, 1918 Ottawa
- Died: February 8, 2024 (aged 105)
- Party: Liberal
- Spouse: Peter Raymond Kehoe (m. 1946; died 1977)
- Children: 6

Margaret Mary "Toddy" Kehoe (née Leore; October 19, 1918 – February 8, 2024) was a Canadian politician, philanthropist and disabilities activist. She served as an alderman on Ottawa City Council from 1975 to 1985.

== Early life ==
Margaret Mary Kehoe was born in Ottawa's Centretown neighbourhood on October 19, 1918, the daughter of John Andrew Leore and Mary Anne (née O'Neil). She grew up in Centretown and was educated at Notre Dame Convent.

Kehoe graduated from the Notre Dame College (part of the University of Ottawa) in 1940, receiving a Bachelor of Arts. In 1947, she gave birth to her first child, Janie, who had Down syndrome. At the time, there was nowhere for a child with intellectual disabilities to go to school. Kehoe fought to open a school in Ottawa for the mentally disabled, which resulted in the opening of the Brighthope School in 1956. It started with Kehoe renting a classroom for eight students before she could get a separate building.

== Political career ==
Kehoe was elected to Ottawa City Council in the 1974 Ottawa municipal election during a "progressive wave of politics" in the city. She ran for office because she had "no land or development interests", and wanted to keep nature in the ward and curb spending and tax increases. She was elected in Carleton Ward in the city's west end, winning 1,786 votes (26.9%) in her first election. She was re-elected in the 1976 election by over 1,000 votes, and in the 1978 election by over 3,300 votes. She was acclaimed in 1980, and was narrowly re-elected in a three-way race in 1982. She did not run in the 1985 election, and instead endorsed her son, Tim.

One of her main achievements as councillor was being part of Project 4000 (led by mayor Marion Dewar), which brought in thousands of Vietnamese boat people into the city, refugees of the Vietnam War. She also opened the first Ottawa Office of Women's Issues, led the commissioning of a statue of Terry Fox which is now located on Parliament Hill, and helped provide low-income housing for single mothers. She was involved in a minor scandal in 1984 when she hired her daughter as an assistant, though it was allowed. While considered a progressive on council, Kehoe was active in the Liberal Party. Her progressive leanings put her at odds with more right leaning Liberals, such as her opponent in the 1978 election, Bill Bangs, who said she had "been swung to the left by some of the left wingers on council". In the 1976 election, she lost the support of Lloyd Francis, the local Liberal Member of Parliament.

== Post politics ==
Kehoe later joined the board of directors for L'Arche, an organization which helps provide community living for the intellectually disabled. She also was a volunteer with Alzheimer's patients at the Élisabeth Bruyère Health Centre. She spent much of her retirement at her family cottage in Tenaga, Quebec (in Chelsea) and wintered in Barbados. She was honoured with a Lifetime Achievement award in 2011 at the local YMCA Women of Distinction Awards.

== Personal life ==
Kehoe's nickname as a child was "Totty", which later became Toddy. Her brother, Jack Leore played for the Ottawa Rough Riders from 1935 to 1938. In 1946, she would marry Jack's friend, Ray Kehoe after he came back from fighting in World War II. He died in 1977. One of their six children, Tim, served on Ottawa city council as well, from 1988 to 1994. She attended St. Basil's Catholic Church. Her close friend, future mayor Marion Dewar, encouraged her to get into politics.
