= Terry Denison =

Canadian municipal politician

Terrance "Terry" Denison (born c. 1947) was a member of the Ottawa City Council, in Ottawa, Ontario, representing the Queensboro Ward from 1981 to 1985.

== History ==
Terrance Denison, a graduate in common law from the University of Ottawa, was first elected to the Ottawa City Council in 1980, and re-elected in 1982. He later became a senior solicitor for the City of Toronto government.
