= Confederation Club =

Service club in Ontario, Canada

- Logo of the Confederation Club
- Formation: 1975
- Type: service club
- Headquarters: Kitchener, Ontario, Canada
- Official language: English
- President: Barbara Shackleton
- Key people: Wayne Wettlaufer (Founder)
- Website: www.confederationclub.ca

The Confederation Club is a local service club whose stated mission is a networking organization whose purpose is to promote awareness and inform members on matters of economic, social or national interest with a conservative focus. While maintaining a partisan bias, it is a secular organization open to all persons regardless of race, colour, creed, religion, gender, or political preference. Their club is in located in the Waterloo Region of Ontario, Canada. Members and guests usually meet on the third Thursday of every month for lunch at the Kitchener Crowne Plaza Hotel while listening to a guest speaker.

The primary motto of the Confederation Club is to be a "Speakers forum for a Canadian viewpoint" as luncheon guest speakers present on distinctly Canadian topics.

== History ==
For several years before its creation, executive members in the Waterloo Region of Progressive Conservative Party of Ontario Associations had talked about some kind of joint project to network and discuss political and economic issues.

In late 1975, Wayne Wettlaufer, newly arrived from the Honourable Walter Baker's riding in Ottawa, suggested the idea of a Confederation Club that was a lunch time project of several Ottawa Riding Associations.

Wayne Wettlaufer became the founding President and first Honorary Life Member in 1976. The first executive would include Monty Monteith, Christina Weylie, Jeanne Foster and Brock Foster.

Other members of the first executive that were actively involved included representatives of the riding associations from Waterloo Region and Wellington County: Carl Sulliman who was President of the Waterloo Federal Progressive Conservative Riding; Rich Hobson who wrote the Constitution; Barb Hull and Rod Nelson who were the early secretaries; and Dave Zimmer, Bill Barlow, John Cosman, Dorothy Beke, Jack Wallace and Marjorie Kunza.

At the founding meeting, a relatively young unknown, Joe Clark was the honoured guest speaker. Within a month after his appearance at the Confederation Club he had become Party Leader, Leader of Her Majesty's Loyal Opposition and the Honorary President of Confederation Club..

== Student History Awards ==
The idea of presenting Confederation Club Student History Awards was put forward in 1980 by John Boulden, a history teacher at then Kitchener Collegiate Institute. John was a Director of the Confederation Club for a number of the Club's early years and advocated for the idea that students should learn about and participate in the democracy in which we live while taking an active role in civic life.

The Confederation Club endorsed this idea and in May 1980 the Confederation Club Student History Awards were commenced to encourage this learning and participation. Each year students in the graduating classes in high schools of the Waterloo Region are chosen by their teachers for their high standings in their history studies.

== Notable Speakers ==
Notable past political speakers:

- The Right Honourable Joe Clark - 16th Prime Minister of Canada (1979-1980)
- Stephen Lewis - Ontario MPP (1963 - 1978), 2nd Leader of the Ontario New Democratic Party
- The Right Honourable Brian Mulroney - 18th Prime Minister of Canada (1984-1993)
- The Right Honourable Paul Martin - 21st Prime Minister of Canada (2003-2006)
- The Honourable Maxime Bernier - Minister of State (Small Business and Tourism)

Notable past business speakers:

- Mike Lazaridis - President and Co-CEO, Research In Motion
- Carlos Leitao - Chief Economist, Laurentian Bank
- Dr Darrell Bricker - CEO of Ipsos Public Affairs

Notable past academic speakers:

- Dr Max Blouw - President and vice-chancellor of Wilfrid Laurier University
- Dr Barry Kay - Associate Professor of Political Science at Wilfrid Laurier University
- Dr Rob Leone - Assistant Professor of Leadership and Journalism at Wilfrid Laurier University - Brantford
- Dr Andrew Hunt (historian) - Associate Professor of History, University of Waterloo

== See also ==
- Waterloo Region
- Progressive Conservative Party of Ontario
- Conservative Party of Canada
