= Bill Law (politician) =

Canadian politician (1913–2004)

Ottawa Alderman Serving with Ralph Sutherland (1970–1972)
- In office January 1, 1970 – December 31, 1974
- Preceded by: Howard Henry and Lloyd Francis
- Succeeded by: Toddy Kehoe
- Constituency: Carleton Ward

Ottawa Controller
- In office January 1, 1975 – December 31, 1976
- Preceded by: Lorry Greenberg, Tom McDougall, Ernie Jones
- Succeeded by: Pat Nicol, Ralph Sutherland
- In office December 1, 1978 – December 1, 1980
- Preceded by: Marion Dewar, Pat Nicol
- Succeeded by: Board abolished

Ottawa Board of Education Trustee
- In office January 1, 1977 – December 1, 1978
- Preceded by: Alan Murdock, Robbins Elliott
- Succeeded by: Sandra Goldstein
- Constituency: Western Zone
- In office December 1, 1980 – December 1, 1985
- Preceded by: Mary Gilmour, Sinclair Abell, Nick van Duyvendyk, William Harback
- Succeeded by: Zone system abolished
- Constituency: Western Zone

Personal details
- Born: William A. H. Law; 1913
- Died: September 4, 2004 Ottawa
- Spouse: Norah
- Children: 4

Ret. Lt. Col. William A. H. Law (1913 – September 4, 2004) was a Canadian politician. Known as being non-partisan and as a moderate, he served on Ottawa's Board of Control for four years and as an alderman on City Council for five.

== Early life ==
Originally from Calgary, Law joined the Canadian Army in 1933 as a Trouper in Lord Strathcona's Horse (Royal Canadians). During World War II he served domestically, and in Europe, Middle East, India and Burma, and retired from the military in the early 1960s. He served as Canadian representative on several NATO committees from 1957, and worked as a senior staff officer with the Army, and set up the United Nations Emergency Fun post in Gaza in 1957. In civilian life, he became the executive director of the Ottawa and District Association for the Mentally Retarded, was an executive member of the Social Planning Council of Ottawa, a member of the Ontario Association of School Business Officials and a former district chairman of the United Appeal of Ottawa.

== Politics ==
Law was elected in the 1969 Ottawa municipal election as the alderman for Carleton Ward, in the city's west end. As the top-vote getting in the two-seat ward, he also won a seat on Ottawa-Carleton Regional Council. An opponent of party politics in municipal elections, he ran on a platform of getting education and civic spokesmen discussing mutual interests, reducing local councils without sacrificing ward representation and planning for rapid transit. He also supported widening the Queensway, building a safety barrier around it, and wanted more day-care programs for children and extending training facilities for handicapped children. In his first term on council, he was a member of the traffic, welfare and civic procedures committees, the latter of which made the decision to cut the city's council size in half (reducing the number of aldermen in each ward from two to one).

Law ran for re-elected in Carleton Ward in the 1972 Ottawa municipal election on a platform of property tax concessions for elderly residents on limited incomes, establishing a five-year plan to clean up the Ottawa and Rideau Rivers, and improving recreational facilities. At the time of the 1972 election, he was also a director of the local Children's Aid Society, and a trustee at the Ottawa Civic Hospital. In the 1972 election, he easily defeated his opponent, Ken Read. In his second term, he served on the regional planning committee, procedures committee, welfare committee, and was chairman of the community development committee.

Law ran for a seat on the Ottawa Board of Control in the 1974 Ottawa municipal election. At the time, he was a part-time sessional lecturer at Algonquin College, teaching in early childhood development. In the election, he wan on a platform of increasing housing, and increasing attention to neighbourhood rehabilitation programs. In the 1974 election, he won a spot on the city's four-seat board of control, finishing in fourth place.

Instead of running for re-election to the Board of Control, Law ran for a seat as a School Trustee for the Ottawa Board of Education in the 1976 Ottawa municipal election, citing that "city hall was generally heading in the right direction and (he) was ready for a change". In the election, he topped the poll in the city six-seat West zone, winning over 10,000 votes.

Concerned about the 'political squabbling' at city hall, and its 'inability to make decisions', Law ran for a seat on Ottawa's Board of Control once again in the 1978 Ottawa municipal election. He was also frustrated that the Board of Education "didn't seem to make any decisions". In the election, he ran on a platform of starting up discussions with the federal government on the issue of "thorny grants in lieu of taxes". In the 1978 election, he was elected to the Board of Control once again, placing third in the race for the four-seat board.

Ottawa's Board of Control was abolished in 1980, and Law announced his retirement from politics in August of that year, citing that he felt it was time for "someone younger with fresh ideas to move into his council seat". He changed his mind however, and ran for a seat as a Trustee for the Ottawa Board of Education in the 1980 Ottawa municipal election. In the 1980 election, he once again topped the poll in the city's six-seat Western Zone. He was re-elected in 1982, and retired from the board in 1985.

== Death ==
He died at the Perley Veterans Health Centre in Ottawa in 2004.
