= Laine Johnson =

Canadian politician

Ottawa City Councillor
- Incumbent
- Assumed office November 15, 2022
- Preceded by: Rick Chiarelli
- Constituency: College Ward

Personal details
- Born: Ottawa
- Children: 2
- Education: Carleton University

Laine Elizabeth Johnson is a politician in Ontario, Canada. She is the city councillor for College Ward on Ottawa City Council. Johnson is the first woman to represent the ward in its history.

== Background ==
Johnson was born in Ottawa, and grew up near Hog's Back Falls. She attended Canterbury High School, specializing in drama. She has a bachelor's degree in psychology and a master's degree in philanthropy and non-profit leadership, both from Carleton University.

Prior to being elected, Johnson was the Director of Tenant and Community Engagement the Centretown Citizens Ottawa Corporation, a non-profit housing provider. She was also the executive director of Synapcity, a non-profit that provides municipal civics education. Johnson co-founded the Ottawa Community Land Trust. She has also taught at Algonquin College, worked as a researcher for the Public Policy Forum, and was a volunteer for Ottawa Victim Services.

== Politics ==
Johnson originally planned to volunteer in the 2022 election. Johnson was backed by the progressive Horizon Ottawa group along with politicians Diane Deans and Penny Collenette in her run for council. Johnson's campaign placed particular emphasis on affordable housing and road safety. Johnson won a majority of the vote, with her strongest support coming from Leslie Park and Westcliffe Estates.

During her term on city council Johnson has advocated for stronger public participation in municipal politics. She has also promoted the expansion of pedestrian and cycling infrastructure.

She voted against "Landsdowne 2.0" which would provide over $400 million of subsidies for the redevelopment of Lansdowne Park. The project was approved by a vote of 16 to 9. She also voted against reductions in the frequency of the O-Train which were approved by city council in 2024. Johnson spoke against the City of Ottawa's "return to office" mandate in 2026.

== Electoral record ==
2026 Ottawa municipal election: College
| Candidate | Popular vote | | | Expenditures |
| Candidate | Votes | % | ±% | Expenditures |
|---|---|---|---|---|
| Laine Johnson (X) | 14,327 | 92.00 | | |
| Malloum Abakar | 1,245 | 8.00 | | |
| Total valid votes | 16,111 | | | |
| Total rejected, unmarked and declined votes | | | | |
| Turnout | | 39.09 | | |
| Eligible voters | 41,211 | | | |
Note: Candidate campaign colours are based on the prominent colour used in campaign items (signs, literature, etc.) and are used as a visual differentiation between candidates.

2022 Ottawa municipal election: College Ward
| Candidate | Popular vote | | | Expenditures |
| Candidate | Votes | % | ±% | Expenditures |
|---|---|---|---|---|
| Laine Johnson | 8,899 | 52.64 | – | $46,702.32 |
| Pat McGarry | 5,652 | 33.43 | – | $42,760.92 |
| Wendy Davidson | 1,338 | 7.91 | – | $6,942.93 |
| Granda Kopytko | 649 | 3.84 | – | $3,880.01 |
| Vilteau Delvas | 368 | 2.18 | – | $2,264.50 |
| Total valid votes | 16,906 | 97.54 | | |
| Total rejected, unmarked and declined votes | 427 | 2.46 | | |
| Turnout | 17,333 | 46.90 | +2.10 | |
| Eligible voters | 36,958 | | | |
Note: Candidate campaign colours are based on the prominent colour used in campaign items (signs, literature, etc.) and are used as a visual differentiation between candidates.
