= Garry Guzzo =

Canadian politician

Ontario MPP
- In office 1999–2003
- Preceded by: Riding established
- Succeeded by: Jim Watson
- Constituency: Ottawa West—Nepean
- In office 1995–1999
- Preceded by: Yvonne O'Neill
- Succeeded by: Riding dissolved
- Constituency: Ottawa–Rideau

Ottawa City Councillor
- In office 1969–1972
- Preceded by: Don Lockhart
- Succeeded by: Jules Morin
- Constituency: Capital Ward

Ottawa Controller
- In office 1972–1976
- Preceded by: Pierre Benoit
- Succeeded by: Pat Nicol, Ralph Sutherland

Personal details
- Born: November 18, 1941 (age 83); Ottawa, Ontario
- Political party: Progressive Conservative
- Profession: Lawyer

Garry Guzzo (born November 18, 1941) is a former politician in Ontario, Canada. He was a Progressive Conservative member of the Legislative Assembly of Ontario from 1995 to 2003. He represented the ridings of Ottawa–Rideau and Ottawa West—Nepean.

== Background ==
Guzzo was educated at the University of Ottawa. He graduated with a Bachelor of Commerce degree and a law degree. He practiced as a lawyer with the firm of Chiarelli and Guzzo from 1969 to 1976, and was a provincial court judge from 1978 to 1989. He briefly served as counsel with the firm Kelly, Howard, and Santini and then operated a private practice in Ottawa until 1999. He also served as a director of the city's Riverside Hospital.

== Politics ==
Guzzo was elected for a three-year term to Ottawa City Council as an alderman for Capital Ward in 1969.

In the provincial election of 1971, he ran as the Progressive Conservative candidate in Ottawa Centre. He came within 182 votes of defeating future New Democratic Party leader Michael Cassidy. From 1974 to 1976, he served as a Councillor in the regional municipality of Ottawa-Carleton.

Guzzo ran for the Ontario legislature a second time in the provincial election of 1995, and defeated Liberal incumbent Yvonne O'Neill by about 1,500 votes in the riding of Ottawa—Rideau. The Progressive Conservatives won a majority government in this election under Mike Harris; despite being the only Tory Member of Provincial Parliament (MPP) from Ottawa, however, Guzzo was not appointed to cabinet.

In the 1999 provincial election, Guzzo won re-election in the redistributed riding of Ottawa West—Nepean against Liberal Rick Chiarelli and New Democratic incumbent Alex Cullen. (The Harris government had previously reduced the number of ridings from 130 to 103, forcing several incumbents to face one another for re-election.) He was again left out of the cabinet in the parliament which followed, and became best known for a private member's bill calling for an investigation into rumours of an organized child sex ring in Cornwall, Ontario.

In 2003, Guzzo criticized his own government for unveiling its budget at the headquarters of Magna International, rather than in the legislature. Later in the year, he courted controversy by making favourable comments about former United States Senator Joseph McCarthy, and criticizing "illegal refugees" for burdening the province's taxation system. These comments may have contributed to his defeat in the provincial election of 2003; Guzzo lost to former Ottawa Mayor Jim Watson by just under 3,000 votes.

== Electoral record ==
1995 Ontario general election: Ottawa—Rideau
Party	Candidate	Votes	%	Expenditures
Progressive Conservative	Garry Guzzo	14,796	45.11	$ 42,588.00
Liberal	Yvonne O'Neill	13,273	40.47	42,982.18
New Democratic	Dan McIntyre	4,138	12.62	29,016.02
Green	Lenora Burke	412	1.26	0.00
Natural Law	Richard Wolfson	178	0.54	0.00
Total valid votes/expense limit		32,797	100.0	$ 47,240.00
Total rejected ballots		274	0.83	
Turnout		33,071	61.29	
Eligible voters		53,961		
Source(s) "General Election of June 8 1995 – Summary of Valid Ballots by Candidate". "General Election of June 8 1995 – Statistical Summary". Elections Ontario. "1995 Details of Candidate Income and Expenses" (3.16MB). & "1995 Summary of Income and Campaign Expenses" ( Word'95 .doc files (146KB)).

1999 Ontario general election: Ottawa West—Nepean
Party	Candidate	Votes	%	Expenditures
Progressive Conservative	Garry Guzzo	22,834	47.79	$ 52,524.00
Liberal	Rick Chiarelli	16,419	34.36	69,057.01
New Democratic	Alex Cullen	7,701	16.12	32,467.74
Green	Richard Warman	453	0.95	0.00
Independent	Megan Hnatiw	129	0.27	0.00
Independent	John Turmel	94	0.20	0.00
Confederation of Regions	Anthony C. Silvestro	79	0.17	806.00
Natural Law	Lester J. Newby	70	0.15	0.00
Total valid votes/expense limit		47,779	100.0	$ 78,526.08
Total rejected ballots		393	0.82	
Turnout		48,172	58.89	
Eligible voters		81,798		
Source(s) "General Election of June 3 1999 – Summary of Valid Ballots by Candidate". Elections Ontario. "General Election of June 3 1999 – Statistical Summary". "1999 Candidate and Constituency Associations – Candidate Campaign Return (CR-1)".

2003 Ontario general election: Ottawa West—Nepean
Party	Candidate	Votes	%	±%	Expenditures
Liberal	Jim Watson	23,127	47.04	+12.68	$ 67,833.00
Progressive Conservative	Garry Guzzo	20,277	41.24	−6.55	60,734.31
New Democratic	Marlene Rivier	4,099	8.34	−7.78	17,396.47
Green	Neil Adair	1,309	2.66	+1.71	2,684.09
Independent	Robert G. Gauthier	353	0.72		Unavailable
Total valid votes/expense limit		49,165	100.0	+2.90	$ 76,392.96
Total rejected ballots		272	0.55	−0.27	
Turnout		49,437	62.13	+3.24	
Eligible voters		79,576		−2.72	
Source(s) "General Election of October 2, 2003 – Summary of Valid Ballots by Candidate". Elections Ontario. "General Election of October 2, 2003 – Statistical Summary". "2003 Candidate and Constituency Associations – Candidate Campaign Return (CR-1)".
