= Don B. Reid =

Canadian politician (1926–2001)

48th Mayor of Ottawa
- In office 1965–1969
- Preceded by: Charlotte Whitton
- Succeeded by: Kenneth Hubert Fogarty

Ottawa Controller
- In office 1961–1964
- Preceded by: Ernie Jones, Sam Berger
- Succeeded by: Kenneth Hubert Fogarty, Murray Heit
- In office 1975–1980
- Preceded by: Lorry Greenberg, Tom McDougall, Ernie Jones
- Succeeded by: Board abolished

Ottawa Alderman
- In office 1955–1960
- Preceded by: Fred Journeaux
- Succeeded by: Bob Simpson
- Constituency: Wellington Ward
- In office 1980–1982
- Preceded by: Marlene Catterall
- Succeeded by: Jacquelin Holzman
- Constituency: Richmond Ward

Personal details
- Born: Donald Bartlett Reid; 30 June 1926 Ottawa
- Died: 11 August 2001 (aged 75) Ottawa
- Party: Liberal
- Spouse: Jean Beulah Armstrong (m. 1949)

Donald Bartlett Reid (30 June 1926 – 11 August 2001) was a Canadian politician who served as the Mayor of Ottawa, Ontario from 1965 to 1969.

== Personal life ==
Reid died at the Ottawa Heart Institute aged 75, leaving behind his wife Jean Reid (née Armstrong) and five children.

== Political career ==
Reid was first elected to office in the 1954 municipal election as the alderman for Ward 4. At the time, he was the general manager of Reid's Furniture and Appliances, attended Westboro United Church, was a member of the Kinsmen Club, was president of the Junior Board of Trade, and the Ottawa Radio, TV and Appliance Deals Association, and had previously been a director of the Central Canada Exhibition Association. He lived at 224 Bank Street.

Reid won a spot on the Ottawa Board of Control in the 1960 municipal election. At the time, he was still operating his furniture store, and had also been a director of the Ottawa Winter Fair. He owned a farm in Osgoode, Ontario where he raised Shetland ponies and beef cattle. He lived with his family at 474 Picadilly Avenue near Island Park Drive.

Reid was elected as mayor of Ottawa in the 1964 mayoral election, defeating Charlotte Whitton. As mayor, he helped start the Children's Hospital of Eastern Ontario and announced the building of the Ottawa Civic Centre. Reid served as mayor for four years. He re-entered politics in 1975, returning to the Board of Control until 1980, when he was elected for one term as alderman for Richmond Ward. After retiring from politics, he continued to serve on the board of the Central Canada Exhibition until 1992. He turned his farm in Osgoode into a subdivision called Fairfield Estates.

In terms of partisan politics, Reid was noted as being a member of the Confederation Club, a Conservative Party organization earlier in his life, but had switched to being a Liberal prior to 1964.
