= Trip Kennedy =

Canadian politician

Trip Kennedy (born 24 December 1946) was an Ottawa City Councillor.

Moving to Ottawa in the fall of 1971, he quickly became involved in community affairs and rose to notice through leading the fight against Highway 416. Its proposed alignment through the “Merivale Corridor” bisected near west-end residential communities. In the fall of 1974 at the age of 27, he was elected to Ottawa City Council and the council of the Regional Municipality of Ottawa-Carleton (RMOC). He served three 2-years terms and represented the City of Ottawa on RMOC's executive committee for four years. A noted community activist, he was a member of the Algonquin College Community Development Program Community Advisory Committee and developed a community consultation process for reviewing proposed city and regional budgets with his constituents. This process may have provided a model for similar, subsequent initiatives by more senior governments.

On his retirement from city and regional councils, he went on to direct Algonquin College’s Adult Basic Education department and then worked for 8 years as the Town of Renfrew’s Chief Administrative Officer. During both his elected and appointed municipal service he was active in the Association of Municipalities of Ontario as a member of its board of directors and executive committee and representing the association on the Provincial-Municipal Liaison Committee. He also represented Ontario local governments at the 1976 United Nations Habitat Conference and Forum in Vancouver and as a member of the 1978 Provincial-local Government Committee on Property Tax Reform.
