= Lorry Greenberg =

Canadian politician

51st Mayor of Ottawa
- In office 1975–1978
- Preceded by: Pierre Benoit
- Succeeded by: Marion Dewar

Ottawa Controller
- In office 1970–1974
- Preceded by: Kenneth Fogarty, Ellen Webber, Murray Heit
- Succeeded by: Marion Dewar, Donald Bartlett Reid, Bill Law

Ottawa Alderman
- In office 1 May 1968 – 31 December 1969
- Preceded by: Lionel O'Connor
- Succeeded by: Michael Cassidy & Matt McGrath
- Constituency: Wellington Ward

Personal details
- Born: Lawrence Greenberg; 31 December 1933 Ottawa, Ontario
- Died: 30 June 1999 (aged 65) Ottawa, Ontario
- Party: Liberal
- Spouse: Carol Gardner
- Profession: Real estate

Lawrence "Lorry" Greenberg (31 December 1933 – 30 June 1999) was Mayor of Ottawa, Ontario from 1975 to 1978. He was the city's first Jewish mayor.

Greenberg was the son of Roger Greenberg, a Russian Jew who immigrated to Canada in 1913, and provided for the family as a fruit peddler. The family struggled in poverty until 1950 when their bag cleaning business won a federal contract to supply sand bags for the 1950 Red River flood.

Greenberg graduated from Lisgar Collegiate in 1952. He was one of the founding members of Minto Developments Inc., but left the company in 1963.

Greenberg first ran for a seat on Ottawa City Council in 1966 in Wellington Ward, but finished fourth in the two seat ward. However, he was appointed by council to fill the seat on 22 April 1968 (effective 1 May), following the death of Lionel O'Connor. The third place finisher in the 1966 election had since died. His appointment was backed by the Bank Street and Elgin Street merchant associations. He was elected by council on the eighth ballot, defeating businessman Leonard Baker, Mathew McGrath, and former aldermen Don Armstrong and Cecile O'Regan. Greenberg was elected to the city's Board of Control in the 1969 municipal elections, and as the city's mayor in 1974.

While mayor, Greenberg was a proponent of community-based planning.

Despite his wealth, he was a reformer. As mayor, he ran a campaign against body rub parlours, and an anti-smoking by-law. Following his term as mayor, he became an antique dealer. He was rumoured to be a candidate for the federal Liberals for Ottawa Centre in the 1979 Canadian federal election, but decided against the idea.

He died of heart failure in 1999 at the Ottawa Heart Institute, aged 65.
