= Dalhousie Ward =

Dalhousie Ward (pronounced dal-HOW-zee or dal-HOO-zee) is a former ward in the city of Ottawa, Ontario, Canada. It was created in 1888 when it was annexed by Ottawa from Nepean Township, becoming Ottawa's eighth ward. It was merged with Wellington Ward in 1994 to become Somerset Ward. It consisted mainly of the neighbourhood of Centretown West, which includes Ottawa's Chinatown and Little Italy. Before it was merged, the ward contained Hintonburg, Mechanicsville and parts of the Civic Hospital and Centretown neighbourhoods.

== City councillors ==
- Levi Crannell (1889-1890)
- William Hill (1889-1892)
- David Scott (1889-1890)
- William H. Hewlett (1891-1892)
- R. Thackray (1891)
- James Peterkin (1892-1893)
- J. C. Jamieson (1893-1895)
- Terrence McGuire (1893-1895)
- Robert Davidson (1894-1901)
- William H. Hewlett (1896)
- William Hill (1896)
- Joseph Foster (1897-1900)
- Terrence McGuire (1897)
- William H. Hewlett (1898-1900)
- William Hill (1901)
- Moïse Plouffe (1901-1905)
- Thomas Cleary (1902-1903)
- G. W. Shouldis (1902)
- Charles Hopewell (1903)
- Joseph Foster (1904)
- G. W. Shouldis (1904)
- William Farmer (1905)
- George R. Ross (1905-1907)
- Charles Hopewell (1906)
- Edward P. McGrath (1906-1909)
- William Farmer (1907-1908)
- George R. Ross (1909)
- Victor Boisvert (1910)
- Jim Forward (1910-1913)
- John H. Slack (1911-1913)
- William C. Rowe (1913-1914)
- T. T. Beattie (1914-1915)
- Edward P. McGrath (1915)
- W. C. Leech (1916)
- Jim Forward (1916-1923)
- Edward P. McGrath (1917)
- John P. Balharrie (1918-1920)
- Fred Hunt (1921)
- W. E. O'Meara (1922)
- Fred Hunt (1923-1924)
- Jim Forward (1925-1929) [ran in Elmdale Ward in 1930]
- Sam Crooks (1924-1929) [ran in Elmdale Ward in 1930]
- Dan McCann (1930-1931)
- Clarence M. Denneny (1930)
- E. P. McGrath (1931-1933)
- Wilbert Hamilton (1932-1933)
- James J. McVeigh (1934)
- Dan McCann (1934-1948)
- Wilbert Hamilton (1935-1956)
- James McAuley (1949-1968)
- Charles Parker (1957-1966)
- Rudy Capogreco (1967-1972)
- Pat Doherty (1968-1969)
- Gale Kerwin (1970-1974)
- Rolf Hasenack (1975-1985)
- Mac Harb (1985-1988)
- Peter Harris (1988-1989)
- Michael Janigan (1989-1991)
- Peter Harris (1991-1994)
