= Wellington Ward =

Wellington Ward was one of the original five wards of the city of Ottawa, Ontario, Canada created in 1855 from West Ward in Bytown, Upper Canada. It existed until 1994 when it was amalgamated with Dalhousie Ward to become Somerset Ward. The original ward consisted of the city west of the Rideau Canal and south of Wellington Street. It has traditionally consisted of Ottawa's Centretown and Downtown neighbourhoods. Prior to 1952, it consisted of the area between Bank Street and Bronson Avenue (and north of the Grand Trunk Railway following the creation of Capital Ward). In 1952, it merged with Central Ward, to its east, and lost some of its former territory to Dalhousie Ward on its west.
