= 1969 Ottawa municipal election =

The city of Ottawa, Canada held municipal elections on December 1, 1969.

Controller Kenneth Fogarty is easily elected as mayor. This would be the last election where two aldermen would be elected from each ward.

== Mayor of Ottawa ==
| Candidate | Votes | % |
|---|---|---|
| Ken H. Fogarty | 57,890 | 81.26 |
| John Kroeker | 5,182 | 7.27 |
| Joseph Louis Paradis | 3,781 | 5.31 |
| David E. Porter | 2,304 | 3.98 |
| Lucien A. Dube | 2,083 | 2.92 |

== Ottawa Board of Control ==
(4 elected)

| Candidate | Votes | % |
|---|---|---|
| Claude Bennett | 47,739* | |
| Pierre Benoit | 43,237* | |
| Lorry Greenberg | 37,926* | |
| Ernie Jones (X) | 29,831* | |
| Murray Heit (X) | 29,446* | |
| Ellen Webber (X) | 18,097 | |
| Roy Donaldson | 13,325 | |

== City council ==
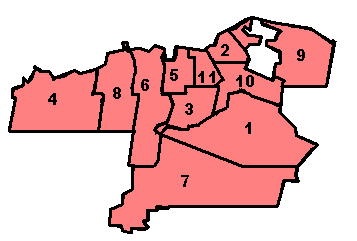
Map of Ottawa's Wards used in this election: 1. Alta Vista Ward; 2. By Ward; 3. Capital Ward; 4. Carleton Ward; 5. Dalhousie Ward; 6. Elmdale-Victoria Ward; 7. Gloucester Ward; 8. Queensboro Ward; 9. Rideau Ward; 10. St. George's Ward; 11. Wellington Ward .

(2 elected from each ward)

Alta Vista Ward
| Candidate | Votes | % |
|---|---|---|
| Don Kay (X) | 6,979* | |
| Jeff King | 6,476* | |
| Gwendeline Power-Binns | 2,250 | |
| Ross Potter | 1,982 | |

Gloucester Ward
| Candidate | Votes | % |
|---|---|---|
| Joe Quinn (X) | 2,780* | |
| Pat Doherty | 1,643* | |
| Bill Zlepnig | 1,506 | |
| Ralph Boone | 1,096 | |
| Leo Gallien | 857 | |

Rideau Ward
| Candidate | Votes | % |
|---|---|---|
| Desmond Bender (X) | 1,976* | |
| Tom McDougall | 1,950* | |
| Colin Matheson | 1,644 | |
| Pierre Belanger | 1,143 | |
| Tom Farrell | 1,003 | |
| Dorothea O'Brien | 697 | |

Capital Ward
| Candidate | Votes | % |
|---|---|---|
| Charlotte Whitton (X) | 4,254* | 35.57 |
| Garry Guzzo | 2,620* | 21.90 |
| Dave Gourlie | 2,013 | 16.83 |
| Ed Henry | 1,511 | 12.63 |
| George Hynna | 1,159 | 9.69 |
| Leo Morency | 404 | 3.38 |

Carleton Ward
| Candidate | Votes | % |
|---|---|---|
| Bill Law | 6,343* | |
| Ralph Sutherland | 5,520* | |
| Ed Mulkins | 2,835 | |
| Philip Coulter | 2,515 | |
| Charles Strong | 1,870 | |
| Alfred Lapointe | 1,168 | |

Queensboro Ward
| Candidate | Votes | % |
|---|---|---|
| Kenneth Workman (X) | 4,366* | 39.01 |
| H. O. Waddell (X) | 3,737* | 33.39 |
| Evelyn Gigantes | 1,346 | 12.03 |
| Edward Ayoub | 1,011 | 9.03 |
| M. J. Besharah | 733 | 6.55 |

Dalhousie Ward
| Candidate | Votes | % |
|---|---|---|
| Gale Kerwin | 1,994* | |
| Rudy Capogreco (X) | 1,737* | |
| Angelo Licari | 1,719 | |
| Frank Chiarelli | 1,454 | |
| Gerry Tremblay | 1,130 | |

Elmdale-Victoria Ward
| Candidate | Votes | % |
|---|---|---|
| Roland Wall (X) | 3,650* | |
| Walter Ryan | 2,403* | |
| Bruce Harvey (X) | 2,383* | |
| Keith Hearn | 1,573 | |
| James Nichol | 601 | |
| George Ayoub | 335 | |
| Ferdinand Clement | 335 | |

By Ward
| Candidate | Votes | % |
|---|---|---|
| Jules Morin (X) | 3,531* | |
| Ralph Brunet (X) | 2,518* | |
| Andre Grattan | 1,113 | |
| James Conway | 947 | |
| Hubert Mantha | 476 | |

St. George's Ward
| Candidate | Votes | % |
|---|---|---|
| Charles St. Germain (X) | 3,353* | |
| R. A. Robert (X) | 3,107* | |
| Thomas Edwards | 1,302 | |
| Raoul Levesque | 1,187 | |

Wellington Ward
| Candidate | Votes | % |
|---|---|---|
| Michael Cassidy | 2,288* | |
| Matthew McGrath | 1,566* | |
| Jim Robinson | 1,525* | |
| Mary Harrison (X) | 1,302 | |
| Sam McLean | 656 | |
| James Doig | 475 | |

*Results official for winning candidates only, or those in close races.
