= 1966 Ottawa municipal election =

The city of Ottawa, Canada held municipal elections on December 5, 1966.

Mayor Don Reid is easily re-elected.

== Mayor of Ottawa ==
| Candidate | Votes | % |
|---|---|---|
| Don Reid (X) | 59,082 | 75.99 |
| Donald V. Sterling | 15,445 | 19.87 |
| John Kroeker | 2,273 | 2.92 |
| Lucien A. Dube | 947 | 1.22 |

== Ottawa Board of Control ==
(4 elected)

| Candidate | Votes | % |
|---|---|---|
| Kenneth Fogarty (X) | 53,449 | |
| Ellen Webber (X) | 42,552 | |
| Murray Heit (X) | 40,074 | |
| Ernie Jones (X) | 39,488 | |
| Louis Titley | 30,346 | |
| Irving Greenberg | 15,536 | |
| Joseph Louis Paradis | 8,638 | |

== City council ==
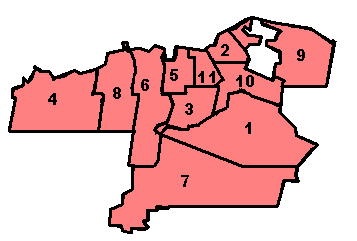
Map of Ottawa's Wards used in this election: 1. Alta Vista Ward; 2. By Ward; 3. Capital Ward; 4. Carleton Ward; 5. Dalhousie Ward; 6. Elmdale-Victoria Ward; 7. Gloucester Ward; 8. Queensboro Ward; 9. Rideau Ward; 10. St. George's Ward; 11. Wellington Ward .

(2 elected from each ward)

Alta Vista Ward
| Candidate | Votes | % |
|---|---|---|
| Don Kay (X) | 6,879 | |
| Pierre Benoit | 4,309 | |
| Jack Stanton | 2,957 | |
| Ralph Stewart | 2,645 | |
| Charles Kruger | 1,560 | |

Gloucester Ward
| Candidate | Votes | % |
|---|---|---|
| James Knubley | 1,528 | |
| Joe Quinn | 1,460 | |
| Pat Doherty (X) | 1,407 | |
| James Robinson | 848 | |
| Ralph Boone | 628 | |
| R. P. Stewart | 579 | |

Rideau Ward
| Candidate | Votes | % |
|---|---|---|
| Des Bender (X) | 2,692 | |
| John Powers (X) | 2,544 | |
| A. L. H. Farrell | 2,010 | |
| Peter Belanger | 1,349 | |

Capital Ward
| Candidate | Votes | % |
|---|---|---|
| Claude Bennett (X) | 5,865 | |
| Charlotte Whitton | 5,013 | |
| Wilfrid Marshall | 1,647 | |
| J. Paul Boril | 1,362 | |

Carleton Ward
| Candidate | Votes | % |
|---|---|---|
| Maurice Egan (X) | 9,976 | |
| Howard Henry (X) | 9,355 | |
| Alfred Lapointe | 1,706 | |

Queensboro Ward
| Candidate | Votes | % |
|---|---|---|
| Ken Workman (X) | 5,164 | |
| Harold Waddell (X) | 3,737 | |
| James A. Donaldson | 2,789 | |
| Gerald Smallshaw | 1,890 | |

Dalhousie Ward
| Candidate | Votes | % |
|---|---|---|
| James McAuley (X) | 2,903 | |
| Rudy Capogreco | 2,224 | |
| Gale Kerwin | 1,609 | |
| Ken Brownlee | 1,248 | |
| John Saracino | 484 | |

Elmdale-Victoria Ward
| Candidate | Votes | % |
|---|---|---|
| Rolly Wall (X) | 5,385 | |
| Bruce Harvey (X) | 3,814 | |
| Harry Weldon | 3,079 | |

By Ward
| Candidate | Votes | % |
|---|---|---|
| Jules Morin (X) | 4,808 | |
| Ralph Brunet (X) | 3,454 | |
| Hubert Plouffe | 1,751 | |

St. George's Ward
| Candidate | Votes | % |
|---|---|---|
| Charlie St. Germain (X) | 3,737 | |
| Rhéal Robert | 2,740 | |
| Cecile O'Regan (X) | 1,919 | |
| Sam McLean | 1,690 | |

Wellington Ward
| Candidate | Votes | % |
|---|---|---|
| Lionel O'Connor (X) | 2,700 | |
| Mary Harrison (X) | 2,591 | |
| Gertrude Douglas | 2,137 | |
| Lorry Greenberg | 1,810 | |
