= 1964 Ottawa municipal election =

The city of Ottawa, Canada held municipal elections on December 7, 1964.

Controller Don Reid is elected as mayor, defeating incumbent mayor Charlotte Whitton, who placed third behind broadcaster Frank Ryan.

== Mayor of Ottawa ==
Candidate	Votes	%
Don Reid	43,991	45.03
Frank Ryan	26,996	27.63
Charlotte Whitton (X)	25,608	26.21
Joseph Louis Paradis	706	0.72
Alfred Lapointe	395	0.40

== Referendums ==
Fluoridation
Option	Votes	%
Yes	58,234	61.75
No	36,079	38.25

Sunday Sports
Option	Votes	%
Yes	61,896	64.97
No	33,375	35.03

== Ottawa Board of Control ==
(4 elected)

Candidate	Votes	%
Kenneth Fogarty	51,280	
Ernie Jones (X)	47,331	
Ellen Webber (X)	39,409	
Murray Heit	32,880	
David Dehler	29,430	
Roy Donaldson	27,878	
Irving Greenberg	21,440	
Arthur E. Wood	17,537	
Serge Tardif	15,125	
Charles Kruger	7,157	
Julia Villeneuve	3,889	

== City council ==
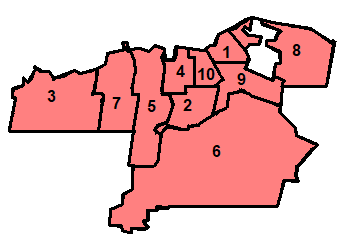
Map of Ottawa's Wards used in this election: 1. By Ward; 2. Capital Ward; 3. Carleton Ward; 4. Dalhousie Ward; 5. Elmdale-Victoria Ward; 6. Gloucester Ward; 7. Queensboro Ward; 8. Rideau Ward; 9. St. George's Ward; 10. Wellington Ward .

(2 elected from each ward)

Gloucester Ward
Candidate	Votes	%
Don Kay (X)	10,267	
Pat Doherty	7,301	
Joe Quinn	6,128	
Bob Stewart	4,506	

Rideau Ward
Candidate	Votes	%
Des Bender (X)	3,820	
John Powers (X)	3,339	
Tom Farrell	2,308	
Charles Roberts	1,739	

Capital Ward
Candidate	Votes	%
Claude Bennett (X)	8,121	
Don Armstrong (X)	5,409	
Lillian Courtenay	2,991	

Carleton Ward
Candidate	Votes	%
Howard Henry (X)	9,806	
Maurice Egan (X)	8,431	
Frank Boyce	6,142	
Robert Ripley	1,957	

Queensboro Ward
Candidate	Votes	%
Ken Workman (X)	5,913	
Harold Waddell	3,937	
Tom Fogarty	3,556	
Brian McNally	2,623	

Dalhousie Ward
Candidate	Votes	%
James McAuley (X)	4,586	
Charles Parker (X)	3,210	
Rudy Capogreco	3,104	

Elmdale-Victoria Ward
Candidate	Votes	%
Rolly Wall (X)	5,741	
Bruce Harvey (X)	4,400	
Jack Norris	3,602	

By Ward
Candidate	Votes	%
Jules Morin	6,033	
Ralph Brunet (X)	3,805	
Clem Aubin	1,920	

St. George's Ward
Candidate	Votes	%
Charlie St. Germain (X)	4,864	
Cecile O'Regan (X)	2,155	
Rhéal Robert	2,073	
Sam McLean	1,634	
Ken Sparling	1,013	
Rex LeLacheur	702	

Wellington Ward
Candidate	Votes	%
Lionel O'Connor (X)	3,191	
Mary Harrison	2,326	
Gertrude Douglas	2,276	
Ivan Sparks (X)	1,803	
John Tidman	911	
Bill Woods	686	
