= 1962 Ottawa municipal election =

The city of Ottawa, Canada held municipal elections on December 3, 1962.

Charlotte Whitton is re-elected as mayor, defeating former controller and owner of the Ottawa Rough Riders, Sam Berger in a re-match of the 1960 election.

== Mayor of Ottawa ==
Candidate	Votes	%
Charlotte Whitton (X)	40,062	43.38
Sam Berger	34,044	36.86
R.J. Groves	18,245	19.76

== Referendums ==
Fluoridation
Option	Votes	%
No	45,428	51.11
Yes	43,457	48.89

Sunday Movies
Option	Votes	%
Yes	55,246	60.99
No	35,329	39.01

== Ottawa Board of Control ==
(4 elected)

Candidate	Votes	%
Lloyd Francis (X)	53,327	
Don Reid(X)	50,046	
Ellen Webber	40,095	
Ernie Jones	36,466	
Roy Donaldson	31,766	
Horace Racine	30,866	
Matt McGrath	16,686	
Serge Tardif	14,818	
Sam McLean	7,647	
Joseph Louis Paradis	6,684	

== City council ==
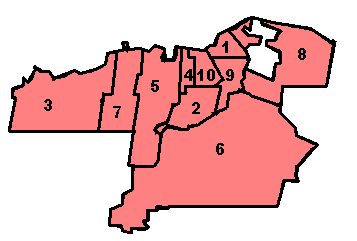
Map of Ottawa's Wards used in this election: 1. By Ward; 2. Capital Ward; 3. Carleton Ward; 4. Dalhousie Ward; 5. Elmdale-Victoria Ward; 6. Gloucester Ward; 7. Queensboro Ward; 8. Rideau Ward; 9. St. George's Ward; 10. Wellington Ward .

(2 elected from each ward)

Gloucester Ward
Candidate	Votes	%
Murray Heit (X)	7,034	
Don Kay	6,373	
Pat Doherty (X)	6,119	
Joe Quinn	4,817	

Rideau Ward
Candidate	Votes	%
John Powers (X)	3,807	
Des Bender	3,208	
Rhéal Robert	3,112	
Cecil Duncan	2,344	
Lucien Raymond	1,706	
Ralph Boone	1,665	
Lucien Bleeo	440	

Capital Ward
Candidate	Votes	%
Claude Bennett (X)	8,720	
Don Armstrong (X)	6,561	
Elmer Fairfield	1,957	

Carleton Ward
Candidate	Votes	%
Howard Henry (X)	11,185	
Frank Boyce (X)	9,746	
Brian McNally	5,074	

Queensboro Ward
Candidate	Votes	%
Kenneth Fogarty	7,125	
Ken Workman (X)	6,672	
Tom Fogarty	1,939	

Dalhousie Ward
Candidate	Votes	%
James McAuley (X)	4,621	
Charles Parker (X)	3,447	
Rudy Capogreco	2,436	

Elmdale-Victoria Ward
Candidate	Votes	%
Rolly Wall (X)	4,905	
Bruce Harvey (X)	3,654	
Jack Norris	2,960	
Julia Villeneuve	790	
Ferdinand Clement	692	

By Ward
Candidate	Votes	%
Jules Morin (X)	4,232	
Ralph Brunet	2,952	
Clem Aubin (X)	2,236	

St. George's Ward
Candidate	Votes	%
Charlie St. Germain (X)	4,950	
David Dehler	3,263	
Cecile O'Regan (X)	3,077	
Donald F. Prot	739	

Wellington Ward
Candidate	Votes	%
Lionel O'Connor (X)	3,353	
Bob Simpson	2,987	
Gertrude Douglas	2,447	
Morris Kertzer	1,514	
William Percy Kerwin	1,385	
