= Jeffrey King (politician) =

Canadian politician, lawyer, and priest (1940–2020)

Ottawa Alderman
- In office 1970–1972
- Preceded by: Pierre Benoit
- Succeeded by: Don Kay
- Constituency: Alta Vista Ward

President of the Ontario Liberal Party
- In office 1973–1976
- Preceded by: Joe Cruden
- Succeeded by: Pat Reid

Personal details
- Born: September 18, 1940 Ottawa
- Died: May 20, 2020 (aged 79)
- Party: Liberal Party of Canada, Ontario Liberal Party

Ecclesiastical career
- Religion: Christianity
- Church: Roman Catholic Church
- Ordained: 1999
- Congregations served: St. Elizabeth's Parish, Ottawa; Our Lady of Fatima Parish, Ottawa

Jeffrey Lyman deWitt King (September 18, 1940 – May 20, 2020) was a Canadian politician, lawyer and priest. He was an alderman on Ottawa City Council from 1970 to 1972, and was President of the Ontario Liberal Party from 1973 to 1976.

== Early life ==
King was born September 18, 1940, at the Ottawa General Hospital, the son of Mary Irma Crawford and Victor Thomas King.

King graduated from St. Patrick's College in 1961 with a Bachelor of Science degree, then from the University of Ottawa where he received a law degree in 1964, and from Osgoode Hall Law School in 1966.

== Early career ==
King was active within the Liberal Party of Canada and the Ontario Liberal Party. He was the assistant manager for the party's campaign in Ottawa South in the 1967 Ontario general election, and was president of the riding association. He worked for the John Turner campaign in the 1968 Canadian federal election. He was one of the delegates for the riding of Ottawa—Carleton at the 1968 Liberal Party of Canada leadership election. Following the passage of the Criminal Law Amendment Act, 1968–69 in early 1969 which legalized abortion in Canada, King became acting president of the Ottawa—Carleton Liberal Association, as its previous president, Dalton McGuinty Sr. resigned in opposition. King was a lawyer and the vice-president of the Ottawa Junior Board of Trade (Ottawa Jaycees).

== Alderman ==
King announced he was running for election to Ottawa City Council in late October 1969 for the 1969 Ottawa municipal election in his home Alta Vista Ward. He pledged to "work for better planning, taxing and administering, better communication with ratepayers and better welfare programs." King ran on a platform of better recreation facilities and protection against disruptive, short-sighted construction. When elected, he said he would "encourage citizen participation in municipal government, ... seek better playgrounds (such as for the families in the rent-to-income homes on Russell Road), more provincial money for education, and more federal money in lieu of taxes. He also believed senior government "must be persuaded to help finance rapid transit and bus service", and opposed "centralization of police, fire-fighting and transportation systems. King won election to city council, finishing second with 6,476 votes in the two-seat contest. He attributed his win to "a hard-slugging door-to-door canvass of 10,000 to 12,000 homes in the ward".

After swearing in, King was appointed to the tourist and convention committee on council. A month later, he was appointed to the city's new committee on air and water pollution, which included four aldermen and five members of the public. The committee appointed King as its vice chairman, and was tasked with studying provisions of the Canada Water Act and the Ontario Air Pollution Control Act.

While in office as alderman, King was re-elected as president of the Ottawa—Carleton Liberals in 1970.

In his first year of office, King supported providing means for property owners to seek compensation if it was determined the city was at fault for flood damage, opposed spending $1,400,00 on a second industrial park site, when a surplus of industrial land already existed, and opposed the city's decision to spend $353,000 servicing an industrial site on Hawthorne Road. He supported a community information centre in southeast Ottawa, and opposed a plan to build a development for senior citizens on Walkley Road. He did support the construction of 420 public housing units in an area which would eventually become the Foster Farm social housing project, but opposed the construction of 2,200 apartment and housing units, including a 1,630-unit development proposed to be built at the northeast corner of Russell and Walkley Roads (now the Sheffield Glen area), stating that it was "cheap land not fit for residential purposes".

To begin the 1971 council year, following a tie-beak vote by mayor Kenneth Fogarty, King was elected to the new Canada's Capital Visitors and Convention Bureau board of directors, after council dissolved the Tourist and Convention Committee.

Rumours swirled about King possibly running for the Ontario Liberal Party in Ottawa South in the 1971 Ontario general election, but he did not end up running for the nomination.

King, by now the chair of the city's air and water pollution committee supported a plan to allow experts to question the merits and the extent of pollution in the construction of a proposed artificial lake in Britannia Park. On city council, King vote in favour parking restrictions in the city, including increasing parking meter rates from 10 to 20 cents per hour. He also voted to create a special board of inquiry to delve into the cause of major flooding in the city in June. He opposed a plan to spend $140,000 to upgrade the Coliseum at Lansdowne Park.

King was again rumoured to be interested in higher office, this time to seek the Liberal Party of Canada nomination in Ottawa Centre for the 1972 Canadian federal election. King was president of the Eastern Ontario Liberal Association from 1969 until the Ontario Liberals abolished the party's regional structure in 1972.

For the 1972 year on council, King was re-appointed to the Canada's Capital Visitors' Convention Bureau, and was appointed to the Air and water pollution committee and as a Riverside Hospital trustee. On council, King proposed the city make a recoverable loan to provide extra money needed for artificial turf at Lansdowne Park which the Canadian Football League deemed mandatory to for the city to host the 1973 Grey Cup, but ended up voting against the city spending any money on the project. King was one of four councillors to oppose a proposed bylaw that would abolish provincial residency requirements for city employees. King voted against a proposed rent-to-income development in his ward at Virginia and Featherston Drives. Residents of the ward were very vocal in their opposition to the project, with King stating that "residents were not opposed to public housing but rather feared 'cheap, unco-ordinated development in the area'" and that the development would "overload schools and parks". Later in the summer, King supported rehiring the city's lifeguards that had been dismissed due to all the city's beaches being closed for the rest of the summer due to pollution, as they had been promised full summer employment. A week later, King voted against a proposal to for the city to consolidate the city's 14 departments into six, cautioning that council should not "move too quickly", and presented a motion "recommending the re-organization proposals be tabled until precise means of implementation are known". Following a vacancy on Ottawa's Board of Control in September 1972, King voted for fellow alderman and Liberal Tom McDougall to fill the spot over Des Bender. He also voted for controller Lorry Greenberg over Ernie Jones to become deputy mayor when that position became vacant at the same time. King opposed a proposal to lower the speed limits on city streets from 30 to 25 miles per hour, stating that "[i]t's unenforceable. And it's a vote-getting, foolish proposal... (and it) doesn't have much support from Ottawa drivers". Toward the end of the term, King voted against a temporary development control in Sandy Hill and the Pinecrest-Queensway areas, and opposed a bid to have taxpayers produce $143,830 to buy paid-up pensions for councillors. With the size of city council being divided in half, King opted not to run for re-election in the 1972 Ottawa municipal election, leaving his seat mate Don Kay to be re-elected without opposition.

== Liberal Party politics ==
King was elected as Treasurer of the Ontario Liberal Party in 1973. The following year, King was elected president of the Party, defeating David Weatherhead. He wanted to seek the presidency because "he wanted to see changes made within the party to make people more conscious of the riding associations with assistance flowing between... the federal and provincial wings." He was re-elected at the 1975 party convention. In his re-election, King called the governing Progressive Conservative Party of Ontario "corrupt" in their attitude toward party fundraising, to which Premier Bill Davis replied "What sewer did (King) emerge from with his observations?". Later that year when the party set the date of the 1976 Ontario Liberal Party leadership election, King was named as chairman of the convention. One issue King had to contend with as President was a handful of riding associations made public rejections of Prime Minister Pierre Trudeau's comments that "permanent controls on big business and labor (sic) may replace the traditional free enterprise system". At the time, both provincial party and the federal party in Ontario were organizationally the same party. King supported splitting the provincial and federal wings of the party at the 1976 party convention, which party members ended up supporting.

In 1976, King was elected president of the St. Patrick's Home board of directors.

King was rumoured to be a Liberal candidate in the 1979 Canadian federal election in the riding of Ottawa—Carleton, but did not run. King was the official agent of the Bryce Mackasey campaign in the 1978 federal by-election in Ottawa Centre. King became president of the Ottawa Centre federal Liberal association in 1979. King endorsed John Turner in the 1984 Liberal Party of Canada leadership election.

== Later career ==
In 1986, King was appointed as "Gentiluomo" (Papal gentleman) to Pope John Paul II, the highest papal honour that can be granted to a layman. The appointment meant that he could be called to Rome whenever an English speaking dignitary visits the Pope. At the time of the appointment, King was working as a lawyer at Macdonald Affleck and Cooligan, and was a member of two parishes; Immaculate Heart of Mary and Resurrection of Our Lord. He was the chairman of the board at St. Patrick's Home and vice-president of the Seminary Students Aid Society, and was the chairman at the Rideauwood Institute.

King did not run in another election until the 1991 Ottawa municipal election, when he ran for a spot as a trustee on the Ottawa Separate School Board. He ran on a platform to "critically review and rationalize school budgets", restraining education taxes, and for "[a]ll school boards in the region (to) develop and maintain dialogue and co-operation". On election day, he won 2,419 votes, finishing 10th in Zone 1, where the top 7 candidates were elected.

King tried again for a spot on the Ottawa Separate Board in the 1994 Ottawa municipal election, wanting to "save money on administration costs", and to have the board "accept a new provincial plan of introducing common curriculum and common standards", and for the board to "participate in cost-saving ventures with other boards". On election day, he won 1,302 votes, finishing 7th in Zone 2, where the top 4 candidates were elected.

Following a career in politics and law, King graduated from the Pontifical University of Saint Thomas Aquinas with a degree in Theology, and then as a Canon Law lawyer from the Catholic University of America. He was ordained as a priest in the Roman Catholic Archdiocese of Ottawa in 1999. He would later become the pastor at St. Elizabeth's Parish and Our Lady of Fatima Parish. King was the chairman of the committee promoting former Governor General Georges Vanier and Pauline Vanier into possible sainthood.

He died on May 20, 2020.
