= Urbandale, Ottawa =

Urbandale
- Neighbourhood
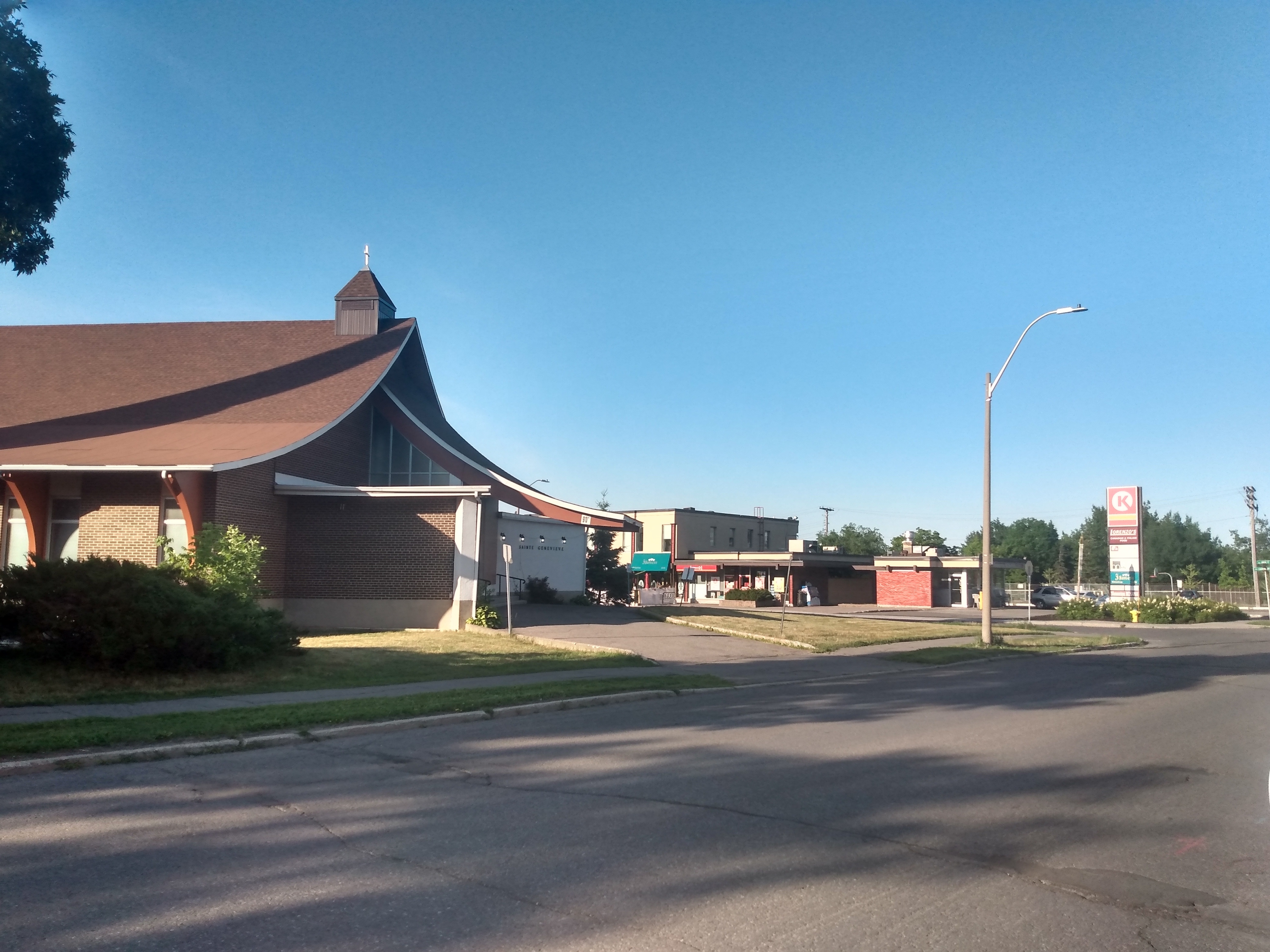
- Sainte-Geneviève Parish

- Location within Ottawa
- Coordinates: 45°23′20″N 75°37′03″W
- Country: Canada
- Province: Ontario
- City: Ottawa
- Established: 1958

Government
  - MPs: David McGuinty
  - MPPs: John Fraser
  - Councillors: Marty Carr
  - Governing body: Canterbury Community Association

Area
  - Land: 1.554 km^{2} (0.600 sq mi)
- Elevation: 80 m (260 ft)

Population (2016)
  - Total: 4,622
  - Density: 2,974/km^{2} (7,703/sq mi)
- Canada 2016 Census
- Time zone: UTC-5 (Eastern (EST))
- Forward sortation area: K1G
- Website: Canterbury Community Association

Urbandale (also known as Canterbury) is a neighbourhood in Alta Vista Ward in Ottawa, Ontario, Canada. The neighbourhood is roughly located south of Pleasant Park Road, west of St. Laurent Boulevard, north of Walkley Road and east of the Kilborn Allotment Garden. The total population for this area was 4,622 according to the Canada 2016 Census.

The neighbourhood was built in the late 1950s and early 1960s, and was first named Urbandale Acres and was built by Economy Home Builders Ltd. Today, the name "Urbandale Acres" usually refers to an adjacent subdivision. The Canterbury Square apartment complex would begin being built in 1964, while the Lord Halifax Place apartments would be built by the end of the decade.

The neighbourhood was part of the Elmvale-Urbandale-Sharel Community Association, which changed its name to the Canterbury Community Association in 1968.

== Amenities ==
In the middle of the neighbourhood is Canterbury Park, which is home to the Canterbury Community Centre, Brian Kilrea Arena, the Canterbury Pool and the Jim Tubman Chevrolet Sens Rink. The neighbourhood is also home to Canterbury High School, Sainte-Geneviève Catholic Elementary School, Arch Street Public School and Hawthorne Public School.
