= 1960 Ottawa municipal election =

The city of Ottawa, Canada held municipal elections on December 5, 1960.

Former mayor Charlotte Whitton returns to the mayoral chair, defeating controller and owner of the Ottawa Rough Riders, Sam Berger.

== Mayor of Ottawa ==
Candidate	Votes	%
Charlotte Whitton	35,532	43.68
Sam Berger	33,825	41.58
Ernie Jones	9,317	11.45
Lucien A. Dube	2,675	3.29

== Referendums ==
Extension of Franchise
Option	Votes	%
Yes	49,856	71.12
No	20,248	28.78

With the result, franchise was extended to all "British subjects" over 21, effectively giving the right to vote for "roomers and boarders".

Sunday Sports
Option	Votes	%
No	37,831	51.16
Yes	36,121	48.84

== Ottawa Board of Control ==
(4 elected)

Candidate	Votes	%
Lloyd Francis	47,736	18.52
Don Reid	47,575	18.45
Paul Tardif (X)	41,591	16.13
Wilbert Hamilton (X)	38,611	14.98
Roy Donaldson	37,112	14.39
Michael Chomyn	18,323	7.11
Jack May	17,815	6.91
Joseph Louis Paradis	9,059	3.51

== City council ==
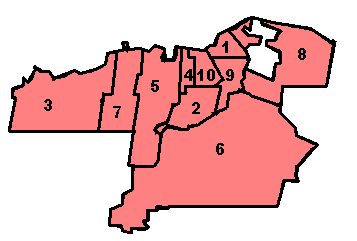
Map of Ottawa's Wards used in this election: 1. By Ward; 2. Capital Ward; 3. Carleton Ward; 4. Dalhousie Ward; 5. Elmdale-Victoria Ward; 6. Gloucester Ward; 7. Queensboro Ward; 8. Rideau Ward; 9. St. George's Ward; 10. Wellington Ward .

(2 elected from each ward)

Gloucester Ward
Candidate	Votes	%
Murray Heit (X)	4,474	
Pat Doherty	3,748	
Alex Roger (X)	3,463	
Don Kay	3,126	
Charles Kruger	2,239	
Cameron Weagant	1,917	

Rideau Ward
Candidate	Votes	%
Jessen Wentzell	3,655	
Ellen Webber	3,464	
Cecil Duncan	2,460	
Robert Thomas	1,865	
Zenon Sametz	1,682	
Ralph Boone	1,028	

Capital Ward
Candidate	Votes	%
Claude Bennett	6,404	
Don Armstrong (X)	4,882	
Noel Ogilvie	2,715	
Hugh Bell	1,475	
Elmer Fairfield	749	

Carleton Ward
Candidate	Votes	%
Howard Henry (X)	8,795	
Frank Boyce	5,777	
Margaret Hamilton	4,756	
Robert Fauknen	4,411	

Queensboro Ward
Candidate	Votes	%
Kenneth Fogarty	6,079	
Ken Workman (X)	5,899	
Allan Kemmis	2,486	
Dorothy Flaherty	2,240	

Dalhousie Ward
Candidate	Votes	%
James McAuley (X)	4,451	
Charles Parker (X)	3,546	
Rudy Capogreco	2,119	

Elmdale-Victoria Ward
Candidate	Votes	%
Rolly Wall (X)	4,696	
Bruce Harvey	3,100	
Jack Norris	2,750	
Ferdinand Clement	813	
Moise Robillard	467	

By Ward
Candidate	Votes	%
Jules Morin (X)	3,601	
Clem Aubin (X)	2,425	
Lucien Vincent	1,946	

St. George's Ward
Candidate	Votes	%
Charlie St. Germain (X)	4,733	
Cecile O'Regan	3,025	
Sam McLean	1,987	
Donald Prot	918	

Wellington Ward
Candidate	Votes	%
Bob Simpson	3,392	
Lionel O'Connor (X)	2,139	
Gertrude Douglas	1,726	
Gib Caldwell	1,471	
George Taylor	881	
Robert Robinson	820	
James Beauchamp	695	
W. T. Lewis	545	
