= Darrel Kent =

Ottawa City Councillor

Ottawa Alderman/City Councillor
- In office 1985–1991
- Preceded by: Greg MacDougall
- Succeeded by: Peter Hume
- Constituency: Alta Vista Ward

Ottawa Alderman
- In office 1980–1982
- Preceded by: Don Kay
- Succeeded by: Michael McSweeney
- Constituency: Canterbury Ward

Personal details
- Born: 1942 (age 83–84)
- Party: Progressive Conservative Party of Canada; Ontario Progressive Conservative Party
- Spouse: Alia Khan

Darrel Brock Kent (born October 1942) is a former Ottawa City Councillor. He served on council from 1980 to 1982 and from 1985 to 1991. He ran for mayor of Ottawa in 1982 and for Chair of the Regional Municipality of Ottawa-Carleton in 1991.

== Early career ==
Kent was involved in politics as a student at Carleton University, where he was a member of the Progressive Conservative Party of Canada Student Federation.

Before entering politics, he was an elementary school history teacher at Alta Vista Public School. Kent first ran for city council in 1978 in Alta Vista Ward, but lost to incumbent alderman Don Kay. Kent had been a supporter of Kay's in the previous election, but became disillusioned citing an inattentiveness to projects in the ward and taking an "irresponsible stand" on the Quebec-Ontario construction border war. He ran on a platform on providing services to the Eastway Gardens neighbourhood and turning the CN railway into a rapid transit route. At the time of the election, he was living on Southvale Cres. Kent ended up placing third with 21% of the vote, well behind Kay who won with 49% of the vote.

== First term ==
Kent tried again to unseat Kay in the 1980 municipal election in the newly created Canterbury Ward. During the campaign, Kent cited traffic problems, a buffer around Sheffield Glen, improved day care services and making the NCC green space into an all-age recreation area, and for the NCC to clean up a swampy area behind Eastway Gardens.

During the campaign, Kent was the target of election sign vandalism (which resulted in Kay being charged with public mischief) and "hate literature", where pamphlets were handed out with headlines re-arranged in "obscene, sexual ways" and which said that Kent should be murdered and is a sexual deviate. Kent would go on to defeat Kay, winning 57% of the vote to Kay's 43%.

Following his election, Kent was appointed to the city's policy and priorities committee. In his first term on council (which also gave him a seat on the Ottawa-Carleton Regional Council), Kent supported the re-election of Andrew S. Haydon for regional chair. Kent was a member of the so-called "gang of nine" on city council, a group of conservative-leaning aldermen who would often vote as a majority bloc to curb social spending, against the wishes of the city's left leaning mayor, Marion Dewar.

== Mayoral run ==
On February 26, 1982, Kent announced that he would be challenging Dewar for mayor of the city in the 1982 mayoral election. He had been a vocal critic of Dewar, and played a role in cutting the city's budget for 1982. The main issue of the campaign would be over Dewar's support of an $8.4 million arts centre at the Ottawa Teacher's College, which Kent opposed. Kent would go on to lose to Dewar, winning 44% of the vote to her 52%. The election was also a rebuke of the "conservative tide" that swept into power in the 1980 election as the new council was more left leaning.

Following his defeat, Kent returned to teaching, moving to Manor Park Public School. During this period, he and some other individuals thought of forming a municipal political party to oppose the "influence of the New Democratic Party" in municipal politics. Kent also got involved in federal politics, and was elected as a Joe Clark delegate for the riding of Ottawa—Vanier for the 1983 Progressive Conservative leadership election. He also ran for the nomination for the Tories in Ottawa—Carleton to run in the 1984 Canadian federal election, but lost to Barry Turner on June 26, 1984, 630 votes to 441 on a second ballot.

== Second term ==
After losing his mayoral race, Kent moved to Florida Avenue in neighbouring Alta Vista Ward. In 1985, he entered the race to run for alderman for the ward, which was an open seat, as incumbent Greg MacDougall was retiring. At the time, he was teaching history and geography at Fielding Drive Public School. Kent ran on a platform to make sure green space in the city was preserved, to monitor the "spiralling" costs for the city's rapid bus Transitway, to see an easement of property taxes, and to attract 'clean industry' to the city. On election day, Kent defeated Dylan McGuinty (brother of future Ontario Premier Dalton McGuinty) in a close race, winning with 37% of the vote to McGuinty's 34%. Overall, the 1985 election saw a comparatively right-ward shift for the city council, with the election of Jim Durrell as mayor, a past supporter of Kent's. After his election, Kent was appointed to the city's executive committee. While on council - and despite their friendship, Kent led a defeated motion to condemn Durrell for his "unilateral decision" to fight against plans to build a new regional headquarters.

While there was some speculation that Kent would run against Durrell for mayor in the 1988 mayoral election, he opted against it, choosing to run for re-election as alderman. Kent would be acclaimed in his re-election bid, with no candidates running against him. Despite running on a platform of more green spaces in 1985, during the '88 campaign, Kent was optimistic to the building of the "Alta Vista Parkway", a proposal to build a parkway on NCC land to alleviate congestion in the ward, but which was never built.

At the beginning of the 1988–1991 term, Kent was seen as "shifting to the middle" on council, in a perceived move to run for mayor in 1991. In 1989, Kent led a 'crusade' denouncing Quebec's Bill 178 French-only law, calling it a "violation of human rights" and suggested the city end its language advisory committee.

While serving on council, Kent ran in the 1990 Ontario general election in Ottawa South for the Progressive Conservative Party of Ontario. He announced he would run after meeting PC leader Mike Harris. Kent was acclaimed as the candidate on August 11. Kent ran on local issues, in addition to the party's pledge to freeze tax-hikes. Future councillor Peter Hume served as his campaign manager. Liberal candidate Dalton McGuinty easily won the seat, with Kent finishing third. While it was seen as a winnable riding for the Tories, it was suggested that many would-be Tories voted Liberal to stop the NDP.

== Run for regional chair ==
Instead of running for mayor, Kent opted to run for Regional Chair in the 1991 Regional elections, the first time there would be a direct election for chair. He decided against running for mayor, as he supported the candidacy of Jacquelin Holzman. Kent ran on a platform of "no more than zero to three per cent" increase in taxes and for the "choking off capital projects". He also supported eliminating the regional government altogether by 1994. Kent also supported instituting light rail under Downtown Ottawa instead of buses, an idea which received a "chilly reception" by OC Transpo commissioners. On election day, Kent finished in third in a close three-way race, with 28% of the vote, losing to Peter D. Clark.

== Post politics ==
Following his loss, Kent became a consultant. He endorsed Peter Clark for Regional Chair in the 1994 Regional elections.

== Personal life ==
Kent is the son of Lieutenant Colonel G. Leighton Kent and Elizabeth LeVernois.

Kent married Alia Khan in 1972.
