= Don Kay =

Don Kay may refer to:

- Don Kay (composer) (born 1933), Tasmanian composer
- Don Kay (politician) (died 2007), alderman on the Ottawa City Council

== See also ==
- Don Kaye (1938–1975), co-founder of Tactical Studies Rules, the game publishing company
