= Hawthorne Public School =

Hawthorne Public School may refer to:

- Hawthorne Public School (Ottawa)
- Hawthorne Public Schools, New Jersey
