= Murray Heit =

Canadian politician and dentist

Murray A. Heit

Ottawa Alderman
- In office 1959–1964
- Preceded by: Pat Doherty
- Succeeded by: Pat Doherty
- Constituency: Gloucester Ward

Ottawa Controller
- In office 1965–1969
- Preceded by: Don B. Reid, Jules Morin
- Succeeded by: Claude Bennett, Pierre Benoit, Lorry Greenberg

Personal details
- Born: 1923 Toronto
- Died: September 11, 1997 (aged 73–74) Milton, Ontario
- Party: Progressive Conservative Party of Canada; Ontario Progressive Conservative Party
- Spouse: Eleanor Spector
- Children: 4

Murray Albert Heit (1923 – September 11, 1997) was a Canadian politician and dentist. He served as an alderman on Ottawa City Council from 1959 to 1964 and as a controller on the Ottawa Board of Control from 1965 to 1969.

== Early life ==
Heit played Junior 'C' OHA hockey in Toronto, and attended the Ontario College of Art on tuitional scholarship.

Heit served in World War II in the Royal Canadian Air Force, from 1942 to 1945. Heit first came to Ottawa in 1943 when he was stationed at CFB Rockcliffe.

Heit received his doctorate of dental surgery from the University of Toronto in 1951, and moved to back to Ottawa the same year. He would become a staff dentist at the Ottawa General Hospital, the chairman of the Ottawa Citizens' Committee for Fluoridation, a member of the Canadian Legion, the Rideau Kiwanis Club and a member of the Junior Board of Trade. He also became the vice president of the Progressive Conservative Association of Ottawa South, served on the executive of the PC Association of Russell, was a member of the Ottawa West Conservatives, and was a member of the YMCA and B'nai B'rith.

== Aldmerman career ==
He first ran for office in the 1958 Ottawa municipal election, running for a spot on Ottawa City Council in Gloucester Ward. Heit won a seat to council along with incumbent Alex Roger in the two-seat ward. While serving his first term on council, he was named to the Civic Traffic Committee, the Committee on Train Speeds and the Civil Emergency Committee.

Heit ran for the nomination of the Ontario Progressive Conservative Party against sitting MLA Gordon Lavergne in Russell ahead of the 1959 Ontario general election. Lavergne easily defeated Murray 756 votes to 166.

Heit was re-elected to council in the 1960 Ottawa municipal election, representing Gloucester Ward along with Pat Doherty.

Heit ran for the Progressive Conservative Party of Canada nomination in Russell ahead of the 1962 Canadian federal election, but lost to hotelier Leo Kelly on the third ballot, 233 votes to 215.

Heit ran for re-election in Gloucester Ward in the 1962 Ottawa municipal election, campaigning on better roads and recreation facilities. As a dentist, he also campaigned on the 'yes' side in the local fluoridation plebiscite. Heit was re-elected in a close election, while the fluoridation plebiscite failed. Heit blamed his stance for his loss of votes, and stated that the "anti-fluoridationists [were] not able to quote any Ottawa dentist or doctor against fluoridation [and] had used anti fluoridation quotations from 'pseudo authorities largely from the United States'".

During the 1963–64 term, one of Heit's main battles was his opposition to building a bridge over the Rideau River at Smyth Road, as it would "funnel heavy commercial traffic" through a neighbourhood in his ward, preferring to instead improve Billings Bridge and Hurdman Bridge. He also successfully pushed a motion for the city to hold another fluoridation plebiscite in the 1964 Ottawa municipal election. He also opposed the constructing of a 72-unit low-rental housing project being built on Station Blvd. in Riverview Park, preferring to instead build a school for handicapped children.

== Board of Control ==
Heit announced on September 14, 1964, his intentions to run for the city's Board of Control in the 1964 municipal election, and got bit by a dog on the same day while campaigning. During the campaign, he supported improving recreational facilities, building a children's hospital, a "stepped-up program" for more public housing and to see the city's water fluoridated. In the election, Heit was elected to the Board, finishing in fourth place on the four-seat board. The plebiscite on fluoridating Ottawa's water was also successful.

During the 1965–66 council, Heit got in an angry debate with fellow controller Kenneth Fogarty about the re-location of Ottawa's new train station. City council could have insisted the National Capital Commission (NCC) spend millions of dollars to move the Beachburg Subdivision railway line, or else not see the building of the city's new station. Fogarty was on the side of the NCC, and claimed Heit might not have his position had he "taken the trouble to attend the meeting with the NCC". The following year, he gained publicity for attempting to enter a painting contest at the construction site of the National Arts Centre by painting his interpretation of Mad magazine's character Alfred E. Neuman's standing "knee-deep in a pothole", entitled "Pothole Inspector". The painting was removed by city officials, as Heit failed to submit the official forms, but it was sold for a "high price" at auction, with proceeds going to the Children's Hospital Fund. Elsewhere, Heit was responsible for implementing efficiency reforms at the police department, and also successfully proposed the architectural design at the centre of Lansdowne Park.

Heit was re-elected to the city's Board of Control in the 1966 Ottawa municipal election, finishing third. Ever the hobby artist, Heit painted a caricature of mayor Don B. Reid in 1967 called "The Pollution Patrol", showing the mayor "astride a rubber swan floating along the garbage strewn Ottawa [R]iver [with] [c]ity [h]all loom[ing] in the background". He entered the painting into the Rideau Street outdoor painting exhibition known as "Artarama", the only humorous entry. After loaning the painting to the Centennial Commission, the painting went missing, and was presumed stolen.

Heit won the Progressive Conservative Party of Canada nomination in Ottawa Centre ahead of the 1968 Canadian federal election, defeating housewife Gwendoline Bower-Binns. During the campaign he indicated the "shortage of housing" in the riding as a major issue, suggesting the National Capital Commission should turn over 600 acres of proposed industrial land. He also highlighted the "government's failure to adequately increase civil servant pensions", and support for "equal opportunity" for civil servants, "regardless of language proficiency" in opposition to the government's promotion of bilingualism in the civil service. Heit ended up losing to Liberal incumbent George McIlraith, winning 34% of the vote to McIlraith's 58%. Heit blamed the defeat on McIlraith's popularity and Trudeaumania.

In 1969, Heit had speculated on running for mayor of Ottawa, as he had "fundamental disagreement[s]" with fellow controller Kenneth Fogarty, who was also planning on running for mayor. One of his biggest disagreements with Fogarty was Heit's support for building large new buildings in the city to ease the "strain on the average taxpayer", while Fogarty supported having a height limitation on downtown buildings. Heit ultimately did not run for mayor, opting to run for re-election on the Board of Control in the 1969 Ottawa municipal election. He ended up finishing fifth, missing the final spot on the board by 385 votes. Heit attributed his loss to "the winds of change are blowing through the city", suggesting that the adoption of a regional government had "stimulated" voters to want a younger, and newer faces on the board.

== Post-politics ==
Heit moved to St. Catharines, Ontario, in 1970 to be closer to a graduate school in Buffalo, New York. While there, he had practised dentistry in St. Catharines and Hamilton, Ontario. He returned to Ottawa in 1971, opening a practise on Metcalfe St. He later became a dog breeder, travelling around North America showing his Boston Terriers Rogue of Royal York and Duke. He later became the president of the Ottawa Kennel Club.

Heit moved away from Ottawa in the early 1980s to join a group dental practice in Mississauga, citing a "need for a change of scenery".

== Personal life ==
He was married to Eleanor, and had four children. He was a member of the Beth Shalom Congregation in Ottawa.
