= Peter Hume =

Peter Hume may refer to:

- Peter Hume (politician) (born 1963), city councillor in the city of Ottawa, Ontario, Canada
- Peter Hume (musician) (born 1985), member of New Zealand rock band, Evermore

== See also ==
- Peter Hume Brown (1849–1918), Scottish historian and professor
