= Ellen Webber =

Canadian politician and lawyer

Ottawa Alderman
- In office 1961–1962
- Preceded by: Robert Groves
- Succeeded by: Des Bender & John Powers
- Constituency: Rideau Ward

Ottawa Controller
- In office 1963–1969
- Preceded by: Paul Tardif, Wilbert Hamilton
- Succeeded by: Claude Bennett, Pierre Benoit, Lorry Greenberg

Personal details
- Born: October 10, 1926 Bruno, Saskatchewan
- Died: April 6, 2003 (aged 76) Souris, Prince Edward Island
- Party: Liberal
- Spouse: Simon Webber (m. 1947; died 1961)

Ellen Douglas "Dougie" Webber, née Macdonald (October 10, 1926 – April 6, 2003) was a Canadian politician and lawyer. She served as an alderman on Ottawa City Council from 1961 to 1962 and on the Ottawa Board of Control from 1963 to 1969. She was the second woman ever to be elected to the city's Board of Control.

== Early life ==
Webber was born October 10, 1926, in Bruno, Saskatchewan, the daughter of Joseph W. MacDondald, a Charlottetown-based lawyer and Charlotte Hughes. She came from a family involved in Liberal Party politics on Prince Edward Island. Her grandfather was James Joseph Hughes, an MP and Senator, and her uncle William Wade Hughes was a provincial cabinet minister.

Webber grew up in Ottawa, Prince Edward Island and Newfoundland.

Webber attended Saint Dunstan's University for a year prior to joining the Canadian Women's Army Corps (CWAC) during World War II, where she was stationed at Kitchener and Ottawa, and achieving the rank of corporal. After 10 months with the CWAC, she was commissioned lieutenant for eight years with the Royal Canadian Army Service Corps militia. Webber spent two years in arts and journalism at Dalhousie University, before enrolling at Dalhousie Law School in 1951, and graduating with a law degree in 1954. She practised law in Halifax, Nova Scotia for two years before moving to Ottawa in 1956 or 1957. After moving to Ottawa, she joined the legal staff at Central Mortgage and Housing Corporation.

== Alderman ==
Webber decided on the last day of nominations to run for a seat on Ottawa City Council in the 1960 Ottawa municipal election. She was convinced to run after receiving discouraging phone calls the night before suggesting she shouldn't run because she didn't grow up in Ottawa, and because "women had no business participating in municipal politics". She ran on a program of "'must do', 'should do', 'could do'", with her must dos being public housing plans, more hospital beds, attracting new industry and construction of subsidized and low-lost housing and building a new centre for the performing arts.

She was elected with 3,354 votes in Rideau Ward, in second place in the two-seat ward. Her election along with Cecile O'Regan marked the first time two women held alderamic seats at the same time in Ottawa At the time of her election, she was president of the Dalhousie Alumnae, a past president of the Elizabeth Fry Society, a director of the Federal Lawyers' Club and the International Law Association, a member of the Canadian Bar Association, the Business and Professional Women's Club, the Soroptimists and the University Women's Club. Following her election, Webber planned to ask for sidewalks near schools and an access to the MacArthur shopping centre, the hospital bed situation and urban renewal of public housing. In her first year on council, Webber was appointed to the Children's Aid Society, Arena Council, Air Pollution Control, Emergency Measures Organization, Tourist and Convention, and Train Speeds committees. She would later become the chairman of the air pollution committee.

== Controller ==
After two years as an alderman, Webber decided to run for a spot on the Ottawa Board of Control in the 1962 Ottawa municipal election. Her main campaign focus was establishing closer liaison between City Hall departments. Much to her surprise, Webber was elected to the Board winning over 40,000 votes, placing third on the four seat board. With her election, Webber became only the second woman to be elected to Ottawa's Board of Control. She only spent a little over $1,500 on her campaign. Upon taking office, Webber was given the responsibilities of social services and emergency measures, and was appointed chairman of the civic procedures and reorganization committee and chairman of the committee for training the unskilled unemployed and was made a member of the Island Lodge Board.

Tempted to retire from politics, but encouraged to run for mayor by friends, Webber ultimately decided to run for re-election to the Board of Control in the 1964 Ottawa municipal election as the "'best arena' ... to serve the people of Ottawa". She ran on a platform of re-organization of the city's major spending departments, and on accomplishments in public welfare including a 'revamped method of budgeting to provide for essential services without overburdening the taxpayer; and co-ordination of the city's services with others". In the election, she was re-elected winning nearly 40,000 votes, and placing third again. To begin the 1965–66 term, Webber was given the responsibilities of welfare, housing and re-development, training for the unemployed and was made the board's liaison with the school boards. Webber decided to run for re-election to the board for the 1966 Ottawa municipal election, unsure at first at wanting to commit to a longer three-year term. She ran on a platform of "attraction of industry, more public housing, urban renewal and 'continuation of a bit of harmony at city hall'". On election day, Webber was re-elected with over 42,000 votes, placing second.

Beginning the 1967 council year, Webber was appointed to the Retarded children's educational authority committee. In early November 1969 she decided against running for re-election in the 1969 Ottawa municipal election, after facing charges she did not file an income tax return for 1966, a charge which she at first denied, and had been advised a relative had engaged a lawyer to enter a guilty plea in her name. It was not the first time she had tax issues, as she had on more than one occasion owed back taxes to the city for her house. However, a week later she re-entered the race, running on a platform of that "would strive for elimination of red date which... is delaying construction of public housing and discouraging new industry from locating to Ottawa" and would "make every effort to see that any public servants displaced by federal staff cutbacks would be provided with suitable alternate jobs and spared unnecessary hardship". On election day, Webber won just 18,000 votes, finishing in sixth, and therefore losing her spot on the Board. During the campaign, she spent little money had made few public appearances. She did not feel her tax issues played a large role in losing.

== Post politics ==
Following her defeat, Webber moved back to Nova Scotia to practise law, but would later return to the capital. Webber was arrested August 9, 1972 following a car crash, where she had a blood alcohol level above the legal limit. She faced more legal issues later in the year when she was summoned to provincial court for leaving her vacated house in Manor Park in a derelict condition, and was declared a fire hazard. The city ended up spending $1000 to clean the building up.

She died on April 6, 2003, in Souris, Prince Edward Island. She is buried at St. Alban's Cemetery there.
