= Peter Hume (politician) =

Canadian politician (born 1963)

Peter Ernest Hume

Ottawa City Councillor
- In office January 1, 2001 – November 30, 2014
- Preceded by: Allan Higdon
- Succeeded by: Jean Cloutier
- Constituency: Alta Vista Ward

Ottawa-Carleton Regional Councillor
- In office December 1, 1991 – December 31, 2000
- Preceded by: Darrel Kent
- Succeeded by: position abolished

Ottawa City Councillor
- In office December 1, 1991 – November 30, 1994
- Preceded by: Darrel Kent
- Succeeded by: Allan Higdon

Personal details
- Born: June 19, 1963 (age 62)
- Party: Ontario Progressive Conservative Party
- Spouse: Ann Marie Hume

Peter Ernest Hume (born June 19, 1963) was a city councillor in the city of Ottawa, Ontario, Canada. He represented Alta Vista Ward in the south end of the city. He was considered by the Ottawa Sun to have been "the most respected politician in Ottawa".

Hume grew up in the Canterbury area of Alta Vista Ward. He attended Hawthorne Public School and Canterbury High School before graduating with a degree in Economics from Carleton University.

Hume was first elected as a city and regional councillor in 1991. In 1994 he was elected to the Regional Municipality of Ottawa-Carleton council (when it became an independently elected position). He was re-elected in 1997. In the 2000 Ottawa election, he chose to run against Ottawa city councillor Allan Higdon for city council, as the City of Ottawa and the Regional Municipality of Ottawa-Carleton were set to amalgamate the following year. He was able to defeat Higdon, and was acclaimed three years later in the 2003 Ottawa election. In 2002, Hume contributed $362.26 to the Ontario Progressive Conservative Party leadership campaign of Jim Flaherty. Hume is generally considered to be a "red Tory", who "votes in favour of social spending, but talks convincingly about fiscal responsibility."

In 2004, Hume allowed a private developer to hold a private party to raise money to pay off a debt Hume had received from running for President of the Association of Municipalities of Ontario. Both Hume and the host of the party has refused to reveal the guest list to that event. Hume would later serve as President from 2008 to 2011.

Hume was easily re-elected in the 2006 municipal elections with 70% of the vote and again in 2010 with 59% of the vote. Hume is currently the Chair of the City of Ottawa's Planning Committee, a position he has held since 2003.

On August 22, 2014, Hume announced he would not be seeking re-election as councillor.

In 2015, Hume partnered with former Minto vice-president, Jack Stirling, in a "strategic partnership to pursue development projects and to advise both the private and public sector." Stirling, the old City of Nepean’s last planning commissioner before amalgamation, is well-known as another former local bureaucrat who jumped the fence in 2001 to work for Minto as vice-president of development, using his experience to stickhandle development proposals through the city’s approvals process.

In 2017, Hume was named as the first chair of a new municipal services corporation which will run the ByWard Market and Parkdale Market.

| Preceded by Darrel Kent | City councillors from Alta Vista Ward; 1991-1994 | Succeeded by Allan Higdon (Alta Vista-Canterbury Ward) |
| Preceded by Darrel Kent | Regional councillors from Alta Vista Ward; 1991-2000 | Succeeded by position abolished |
| Preceded by Allan Higdon (Alta Vista-Canterbury Ward) | City councillors from Alta Vista Ward; 2001-present | Succeeded by Jean Cloutier |
