= Greg MacDougall =

Canadian politician

Dr. Greg MacDougall

Ottawa Alderman
- In office 1980–1985
- Preceded by: Don Kay
- Succeeded by: Darrel Kent
- Constituency: Alta Vista Ward

Personal details
- Born: 1947 Halifax, Nova Scotia, Canada
- Died: April 21, 2025 (aged 77–78) Victoria, British Columbia, Canada
- Party: Conservative Party of Canada (2010-2025); Liberal Party of Canada (1976-2010)
- Spouse: Barbara

William Gregory MacDougall (1947–2025) was a Canadian politician who served on Ottawa City Council from 1980 to 1985. He served as the city's deputy mayor from 1981 to 1982 and was briefly acting mayor in 1985.

== Early career ==
MacDougall grew up in Ottawa, Glasgow and Belfast, and attended Ridgemont High School in Ottawa before taking pre-medical studies at the University of Ottawa and getting his medical degree from the University of Glasgow.

Prior to entering politics, MacDougall was a medical doctor, specializing in family medicine. He studied in Scotland. He had practised medicine for eight years prior to 1980, and had lived in Alta Vista for 20 years prior. He continued to practice medicine, in a scaled down capacity while serving on council.

== First term ==
MacDougall ran in the 1980 municipal election on a law and order and crime control platform. He ran in Alta Vista Ward, which had been divided in half due to redistribution, with its incumbent Don Kay opting to run in Canterbury Ward instead. At the time of the election he was living on Ferncroft Cres. in Guildwood Estates. MacDougall defeated former school board trustee Roy Bushfield, winning 43% of the vote to Bushfield's 31% in an upset.

While describing himself as "not really a right-wing guy", MacDougall was a member of the "gang of nine" on Ottawa City Council that formed a conservative majority opposing the agenda of left leaning mayor Marion Dewar. MacDougall was elected as deputy mayor of Ottawa in a council vote on November 18, 1981, defeating Marlene Catterall in a 9-7 vote, and served a half-year term. He served in that capacity until May 1982 when Catterall was elected. During his first term on council, he started a community organization, a neighbourhood newspaper and a Neighbourhood Watch system, which shed a "74-per-cent reduction in house break-ins".

== Second term ==
MacDougall ran for re-election in the 1982 municipal elections. He ran on a platform on fixing infrastructure, recreation facilities for youth and the creation of a drop-in centre for senior citizens. He was opposed by Earle McPhail, who was a strong supporter of the creation of the "Alta Vista Parkway", and opposed MacDougall's support for the rapid-transit bus route, the Transitway. On election day, MacDougall easily defeated McPhail winning 79% of the vote to McPhail's 21%.

Following his re-election in 1982, MacDougall served on the Regional Municipality of Ottawa-Carleton executive committee. During his second term on council, the body moderated itself compared to the polarization of the previous council. MacDougall himself "emerged as an influential power broker" during this period. In 1983, MacDougall was appointed to the newly created race relations committee to "better communicate with minorities". In 1984, MacDougall was appointed to the city's police commission. He briefly served as acting mayor of the city when Dewar was on holiday in 1985. While sitting on council, MacDougall ran for the Liberal Party of Canada nomination in Ottawa—Carleton for the 1984 Canadian federal election. The nomination meeting was held on August 1, 1984, and MacDougall finished third out of four candidates, winning 280 votes, behind winner Albert Roy's 1,072 votes and Eugene Bellemare's 476 votes. MacDougall had joined the Liberal Party in 1976, and was president of the Ottawa and District Liberal Association. He was elected to that position earlier in the year. MacDougall's politics were described as "[f]iscally conservative [with a] strong streak of the civil libertarian". He supported affirmative action, and withstood opposition in the ward for supporting a grant to the Gays of Ottawa.

MacDougall decided to not run for re-election in 1985, opting to return full time to his medical practice. He endorsed Jim Durrell for mayor in the 1985 mayoral election.

== Post politics ==
In the late 1990s, he left his family practice and attended the University of Ottawa, and got a masters degree in health administration and also worked for the Ottawa Heart Institute. He then enrolled at Carleton University's Norman Paterson School of International Affairs. MacDougall moved to Hanoi, Vietnam around 2000 to become chief medical officer for International SOS Hanoi, an organization designed to deliver medical services to expatriates. There, he was instrumental in helping contain an outbreak of the SARS virus. He also worked in Doha as a medical advisor for Mobil Oil and in N'Djamena for an ExxonMobil clinic before moving to Victoria, British Columbia in 2005. He retired 10 years later.

When his son, Andrew became director of communications to Conservative Prime Minister Stephen Harper, he was a supporter of the conservative party.

== Personal life ==
MacDougall married Barbara, a British midwife whom he met while interning in Toronto, and had two children. He died on Easter Monday 2025 in Victoria, British Columbia following a struggle with Parkinson's.
