= Eastway Gardens =

- Neighbourhood
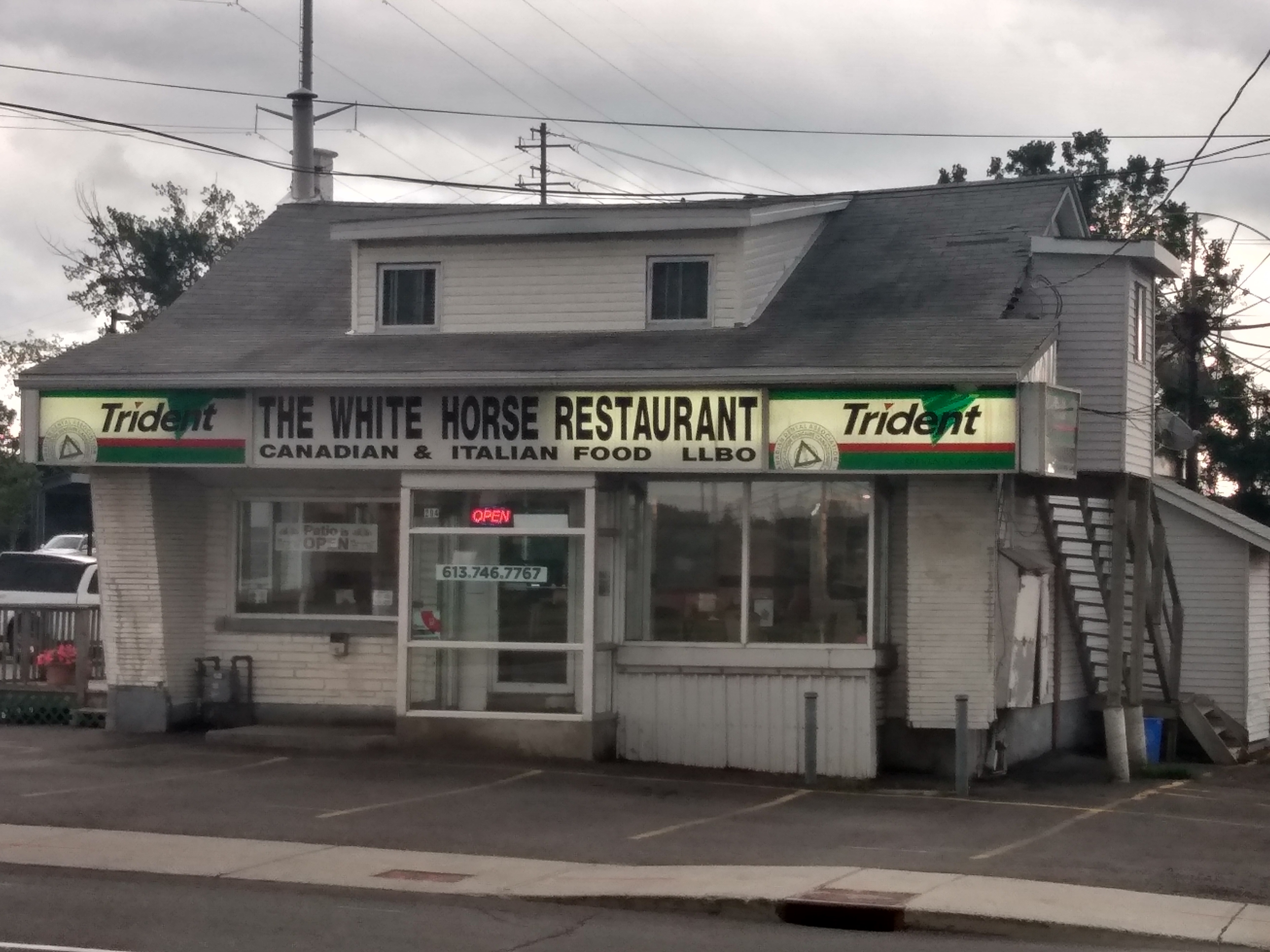
- The White Horse Restaurant (in operation from 1959 to 2021)

- Location within Ottawa
- Coordinates: 45°25′02″N 75°38′36″W
- Country: Canada
- Province: Ontario
- City: Ottawa

Government
  - Governing body: Eastway Gardens Residents Association
  - MPs: David McGuinty
  - MPPs: John Fraser
  - Councillors: Marty Carr

Area
  - Land: 0.793 km^{2} (0.306 sq mi)
- Elevation: 65 m (213 ft)

Population (2016)
  - Total: 602
  - Density: 759/km^{2} (1,970/sq mi)
- Canada 2016 Census
- Time zone: UTC−5 (Eastern (EST))
  - Summer (DST): UTC−4 (EDT)
- Forward sortation area: K1G
- Website: Eastway Gardens Residents Association

Eastway Gardens is a small neighbourhood in Alta Vista Ward in the east end of Ottawa, Ontario, Canada. It consists of a series of avenues coming off of Tremblay Road between Riverside Drive and St. Laurent Boulevard. Most of these avenues are named for letters of the alphabet, beginning with Avenue K and ending with Avenue U. According to the Canada 2016 Census, the neighbourhood had a population of 602. The residents association boundaries for the neighbourhood are the Rideau River to the west, St. Laurent Boulevard to the east, Coventry Road to the north, and Belfast Road to the south.

== History ==
In 1911, this area of the Gloucester Township was registered as the new subdivision of Bannermount on the property of Nicholas J. Tremblay. The new subdivision was intended to be built to house railway employees. The original plan for Bannermount was to have the streets be named with Avenue A in the west to Avenue U in the east (skipping I), yet not much was actually built. Most houses were built in the subdivision in the late 1950s by Teron Construction when the neighbourhood was renamed Eastway Gardens. Avenues A through D were expropriated to make way for the Riverside Drive interchange with the Queensway, while avenues E through H were expropriated for Ottawa's new Train Station when it was built in 1966. Homes on avenues J through L were replaced with Industrial buildings around the same time.

== Demographics ==
Eastway Gardens corresponds to Statistics Canada Dissemination Area 35060991. According to the 2016 census, 60% of the population is Anglophone and 25% Francophone. The top two non-official languages are Arabic (5%) and Portuguese (5%).

Dissemination Area
| Year | Pop. | ±% |
|---|---|---|
| 2001 | 620 | — |
| 2006 | 601 | −3.1% |
| 2011 | 583 | −3.0% |
| 2016 | 602 | +3.3% |
