= 1997 Ottawa municipal election =

Election in Ontario, Canada

1997 Ottawa mayoral election
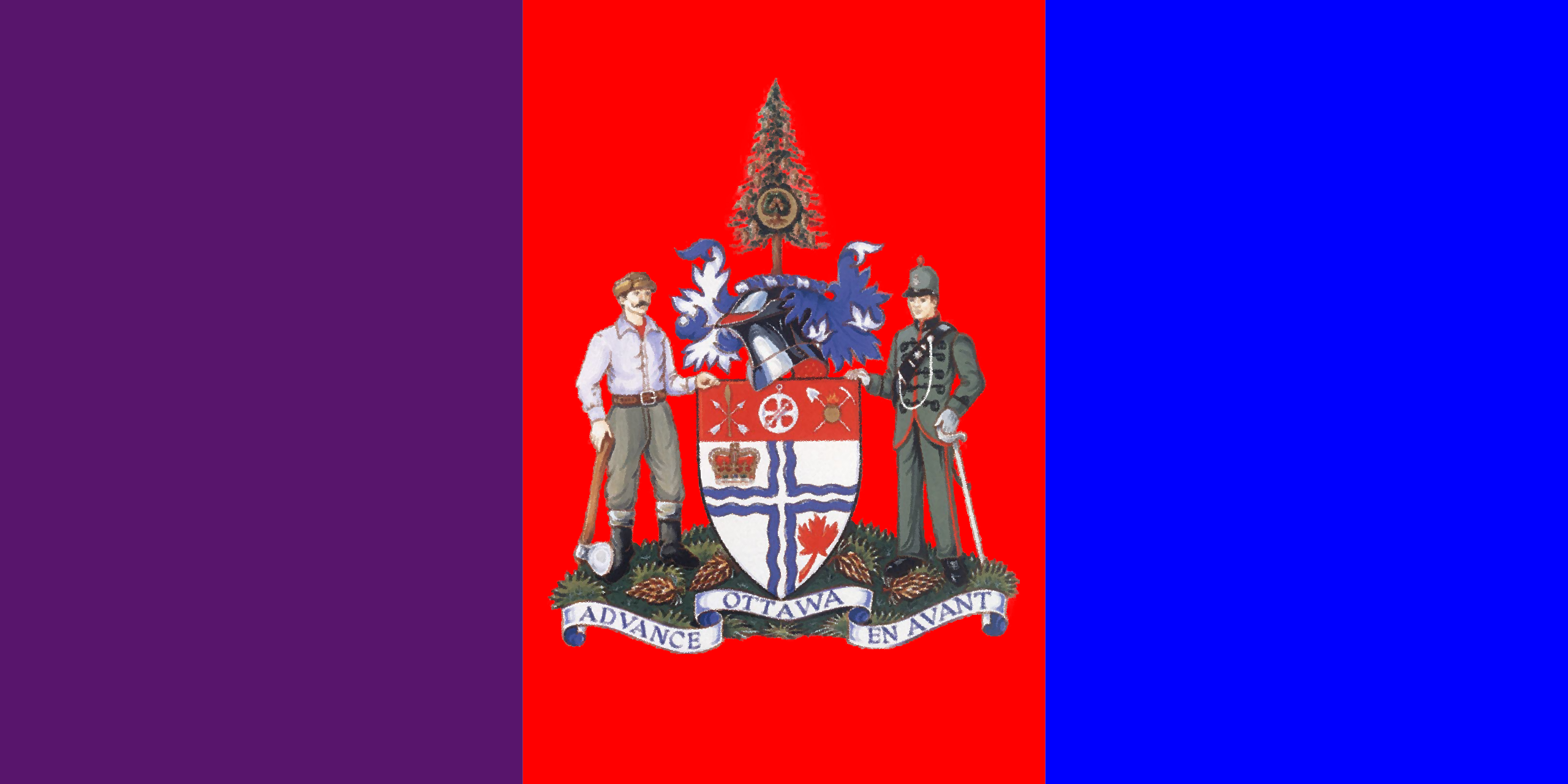
- November 10, 1997
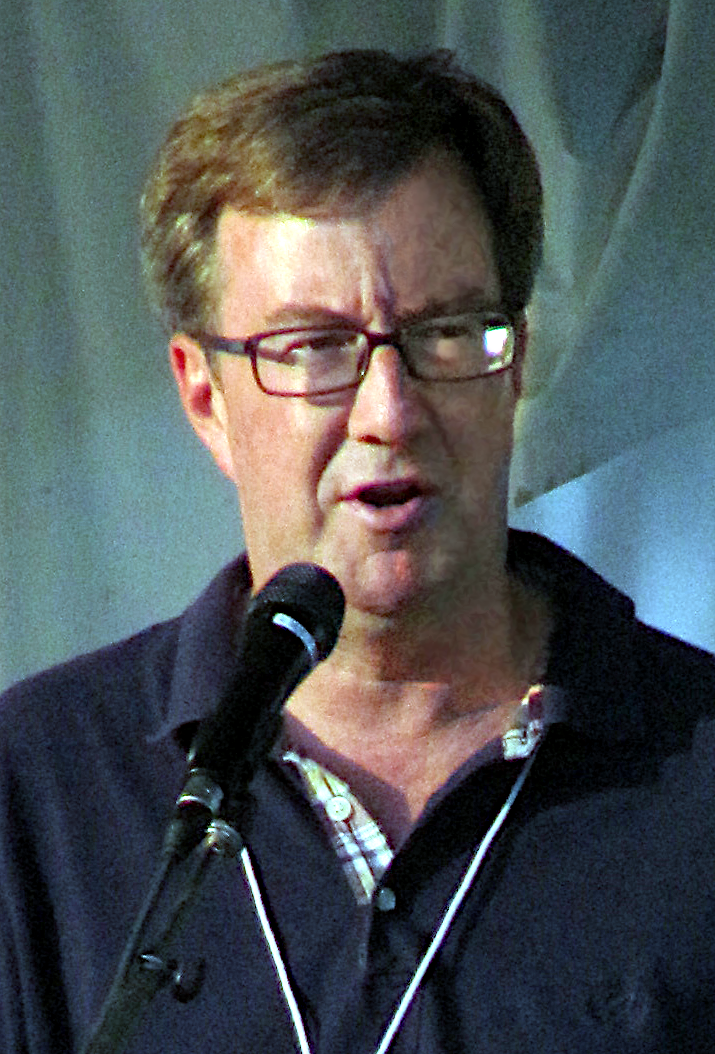
Candidate	Jim Watson	Robert G. Gauthier
Popular vote	54,148	8,037
Percentage	81.56%	12.11%
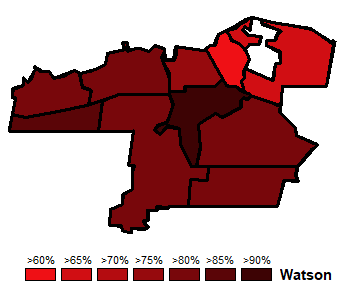
- Results by ward
Mayor before election
Jacquelin Holzman
Elected mayor
Jim Watson

The 1997 Ottawa municipal election was held on November 10, 1997, in Ottawa, Canada. Capital Ward councillor Jim Watson was easily elected mayor over two lesser known candidates. Mayor Jacquelin Holzman did not run for re-election. This would be the last election for the old city of Ottawa. Ottawans also elected members of Regional Council and Regional Chair of the Regional Municipality of Ottawa-Carleton. For those results see 1997 Ottawa-Carleton Regional Municipality elections.

== Mayoral race ==
Candidate	Vote	%
Jim Watson	54,148	81.56
Robert G. Gauthier	8,037	12.11
Alexander Saikaley	4,209	6.34

=== Results by ward ===
Watson easily won all 10 wards in the city, but was the weakest in the more Francophone wards of Rideau and Bruyère-Strathcona. His strongest ward was Capital, which he had previously represented on city council.

Ward	Gauthier	Saikaley	Watson
Britannia-Richmond (1)	782	556	7,049
Carleton (2)	362	269	3,880
Southgate (3)	505	317	3,468
Rideau Ward (4)	1,456	335	3,703
Bruyère-Strathcona (5)	1,205	206	2,472
Somerset (6)	755	394	3,730
Kitchissippi (7)	736	555	7,096
Mooney's Bay (8)	628	633	6,630
Capital (9)	488	307	7,544
Alta Vista-Canterbury (10)	1,035	596	7,804
Special	85	41	772

== City council ==
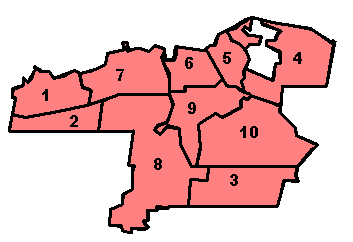
Map of Ottawa's Wards used in this election: 1. Britannia-Richmond Ward; 2. Carleton Ward; 3. Southgate Ward; 4. Rideau Ward; 5. Bruyère-Strathcona Ward; 6. Somerset Ward; 7. Kitchissippi Ward; 8. Mooney's Bay Ward; 9. Capital Ward; 10. Alta Vista-Canterbury Ward.

Britannia-Richmond Ward
Candidate	Votes	%
Ron Kolbus (X)	6506	75.93
Jim Jones	1639	19.13
Alphonse Lapointe	423	4.94

Carleton Ward
Candidate	Votes	%
Brian Mackey (X)	3552	74.51
Michael O'Byrne	1215	24.49

Southgate Ward
Candidate	Votes	%
Diane Deans (X)	ACCLAIMED	

Rideau Ward
Candidate	Votes	%
Richard Cannings (X)	ACCLAIMED	

Bruyère-Strathcona Ward
Candidate	Votes	%
Stéphane Émard-Chabot (X)	3218	82.64
Allan Brian Shields	371	9.53
Steven Merritt	305	7.83

Somerset Ward
Candidate	Votes	%
Elisabeth Arnold (X)	4004	78.16
Kris Schimmel	1119	21.84

Kitchissippi Ward
Candidate	Votes	%
Shawn Little	2968	35.03
Paul Copeland	1809	21.35
Andre Vertes	1605	18.94
Brenda Parris	851	10.04
Linda Kitchikeesic Juden	822	9.70
Michael Kostiuc	253	2.99
Michael Bartholomew	165	1.95

Mooney's Bay Ward
Candidate	Votes	%
Karin Howard (X)	5005	62.00
Kathy Ablett	3068	38.00

Capital Ward
Candidate	Votes	%
Inez Berg	3843	46.85
Colin McSweeney	1660	20.24
Domenic Santaguida	1136	13.85
Craig Watson	521	6.35
Chris Jalkotzy	511	6.23
Tim Porter	336	4.10
Jaine Marulanda	196	2.39

Alta Vista-Canterbury Ward
Candidate	Votes	%
Allan Higdon (X)	ACCLAIMED	

== Sources ==
- Ottawa Citizen, November 11, 1997, edition
- Ottawa Sun, November 11, 1997, edition
