= 2000 Ottawa municipal election =

Election in Ontario, Canada

2000 Ottawa mayoral election
- November 13, 2000
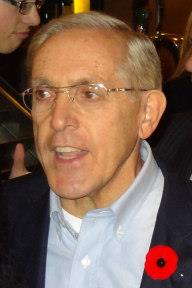
Candidate	Bob Chiarelli	Claudette Cain
Popular vote	142,972	102,940
Percentage	56.32	40.55%
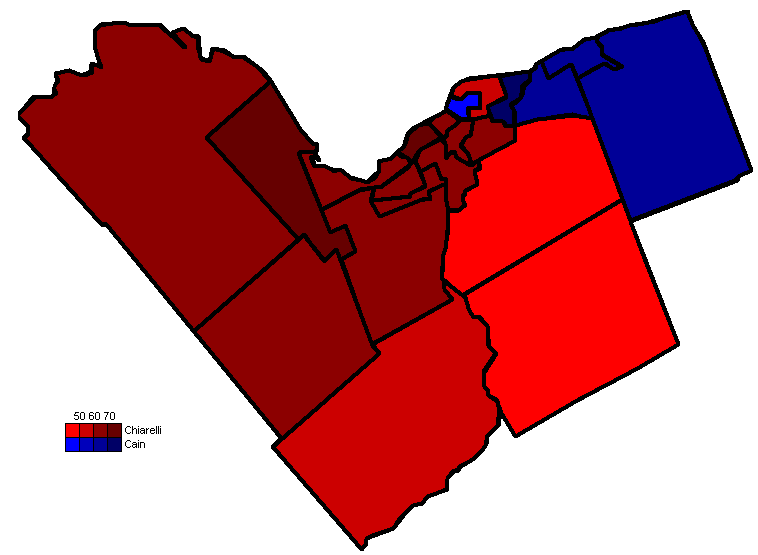
- Popular vote results by ward
Mayor before election
Allan Higdon (interim)
Elected mayor
Bob Chiarelli

The 2000 Ottawa municipal election was a municipal election that was held on November 13, 2000, in Ottawa. The elections were held for mayor of Ottawa, Ottawa City Council and a number of school trustees. These elections were the first for the amalgamated city, which added 10 former municipalities to Ottawa. The amalgamation occurred on January 1, 2001.

== Mayoral race ==
The race for mayor only had two major candidates, that of the Chair of the Regional Municipality of Ottawa-Carleton, Bob Chiarelli and the mayor of the City of Gloucester, Claudette Cain. Cain did very well in her native Gloucester, as well as in the more francophone areas like Cumberland and Vanier. Bob Chiarelli won most of the other wards, including one that was partly in Gloucester. His strongest showing was in Kanata and Kitchissippi Ward.

The election had few major issues surrounding it, with Chiarelli's main debate issue being a plan to recapitalize Hydro Ottawa to help finance infrastructure projects. Chiarelli was seen as a "solid, no-frills and experienced politician who quietly gets the job done", running an "amorphous, centrist" campaign. Cain was the underdog in the campaign and campaigned on cutting taxes and a "go-slow approach" to infrastructure in contrast to Chiarelli.

=== Results ===
2000 Ottawa municipal election: Mayor
Party	Candidate	Votes	%	±%
Independent	Bob Chiarelli	142,972	56.32	+6.72 (Note: Results taken from 1997 regional election.)
Independent	Claudette Cain	102,940	40.55	-
Independent	George Saadé	2,597	1.02	-
Independent	Marc-André Bélair	1,846	0.73	-
Independent	James A. Hall	843	0.33	-
Independent	Ken Mills	773	0.30	-
Independent	Paula Nemchin	702	0.28	-
Independent	John Turmel	677	0.27	-2.23
Independent	Morteza Naini	516	0.20	-
Total valid votes		253,866		

== City council ==
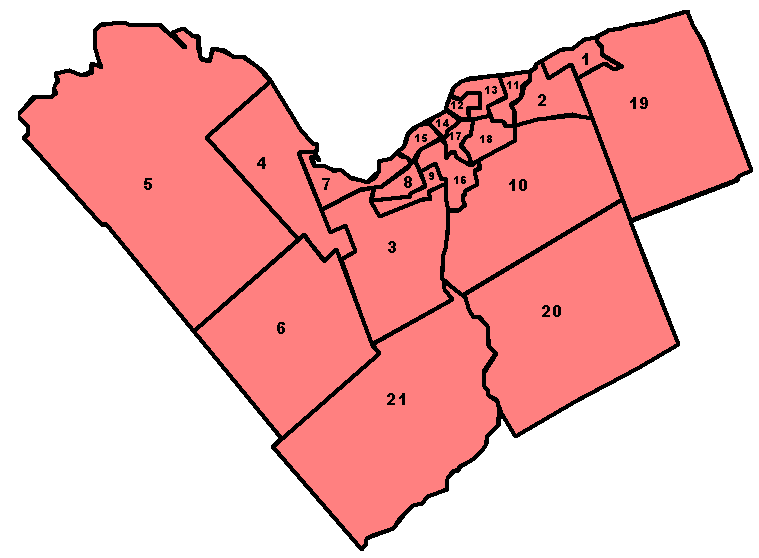
Map of Ottawa's Wards used in this election: 1. Orléans Ward; 2. Innes Ward; 3. Bell-South Nepean Ward; 4. Kanata Ward; 5. West Carleton Ward; 6. Goulbourn Ward; 7. Bay Ward; 8. Baseline Ward; 9. Knoxdale-Merivale Ward; 10. Gloucester-Southgate Ward; 11. Beacon Hill-Cyrville Ward; 12. Rideau-Vanier Ward; 13. Rideau-Rockcliffe Ward; 14. Somerset Ward; 15. Kitchissippi Ward; 16. River Ward; 17. Capital Ward; 18. Alta Vista Ward; 19. Cumberland Ward; 20. Osgoode Ward; 21. Rideau Ward.

The city council elections were very fierce, because many wards faced incumbents against each other because of the amalgamation. In the rural areas, some mayors ran for city council.

Results:

Orléans Ward
Candidate	Votes	%
Herb Kreling	7029	40.96
John Morgan	5564	32.42
Gerry Lalonde	4569	26.62

Innes Ward
Candidate	Votes	%
Rainer Bloess	7006	52.01
Ed Campbell	3442	25.55
Luc Brisebois	1572	11.67
Marc Thibault	1451	10.77

Bell-South Nepean Ward
Candidate	Votes	%
Jan Harder	10640	60.89
Molly McGoldrick-Larsen	6834	39.11

Kanata Ward
Candidate	Votes	%
Alex Munter	ACCLAIMED	

West Carleton Ward
Candidate	Votes	%
Dwight Eastman	3420	50.07
David Whiteman	2559	37.47
Harold O. Daley	851	12.46

Goulbourn Ward
Candidate	Votes	%
Janet Stavinga	4528	45.01
Betty Hill	3401	33.80
Steven Lewis	2132	21.19

Bay Ward
Candidate	Votes	%
Alex Cullen	7191	48.02
Doug Shouldice	6262	41.82
Jim Jones	572	3.82
Jeff Seeton	550	3.67
Geoffrey Sharpe	399	2.66

Baseline Ward
Candidate	Votes	%
Rick Chiarelli	5738	59.67
Al Loney	3879	40.33

Knoxdale-Merivale Ward
Candidate	Votes	%
Gord Hunter	7845	71.27
Al Speyers	3163	28.73

Gloucester-Southgate Ward
Candidate	Votes	%
Diane Deans	6724	48.62
George Barrett	4599	33.25
Bob Leedy	2274	16.44
Anoop Rangi	234	1.69

Beacon Hill-Cyrville Ward
Candidate	Votes	%
Michel Bellemare	6547	57.87
Pat Clark	4767	42.13

Rideau-Vanier Ward
Candidate	Votes	%
Madeleine Meilleur	ACCLAIMED	

Rideau-Rockcliffe Ward
Candidate	Votes	%
Jacques Legendre	7269	64.07
Richard Cannings	4077	35.93

Somerset Ward
Candidate	Votes	%
Elisabeth Arnold	6517	75.77
Olivia Bradley	2084	24.2

Kitchissippi Ward
Candidate	Votes	%
Shawn Little	5721	47.32
Linda Davis	4845	40.07
Ray Kostuch	1525	12.61

River Ward
Candidate	Votes	%
Wendy Stewart	7091	79.95
Dave Hagerman	1778	20.05

Capital Ward
Candidate	Votes	%
Clive Doucet	6486	69.51
Jim Bickford	2845	30.49

Alta Vista Ward
Candidate	Votes	%
Peter Hume	8625	55.67
Allan Higdon	6345	40.96
Ahmed Mohamed Nor	522	3.37

Cumberland Ward
Candidate	Votes	%
Phil McNeely	3814	44.55
Robert van den Ham	1866	21.80
David Lewis	1631	19.05
Judy Poulin	1250	14.60

Osgoode Ward
Candidate	Votes	%
Doug Thompson	4034	56.29
John Cyr	2027	28.28
Dwayne Acres	1106	15.43

City council
Rideau Ward	Votes	%
Glenn Brooks	3444	65.10
James Stewart	1846	34.90

== School trustee races ==
=== Ottawa-Carleton District School Board Trustees ===
Zone 1 (West Carleton, Goulbourn/Rideau)
Candidate	Votes	%
Lynn Scott	Acclaimed	

Zone 2 (Kanata)
Candidate	Votes	%
Jim Libbey	6,789	66.04
Mark Williams	3,491	33.96

Zone 3 (Bell/South Nepean)
Candidate	Votes	%
Norm MacDonald	8,763	81.59
Gerry Taylor	1,977	18.41

Zone 4 (Bay)
Candidate	Votes	%
Margaret Lange	5,170	51.61
Patty Anne Hill	3,800	37.94
Heinz Fildebrandt	1,047	10.45

Zone 5 (Baseline/Knoxdale-Merivale)
Candidate	Votes	%
Myrna Laurenceson	9,150	54.29
Alex Getty	7,704	45.71

Zone 6 (Rideau-Rockcliffe/Alta Vista)
Candidate	Votes	%
Russ Jackson	7,523	52.36
Chris Ellis	6,844	47.64

Zone 7 (Gloucester-Southgate/Osgoode)
Candidate	Votes	%
Pam Morse	5,864	48.12
Greg Laws	5,672	46.54
Krishen Rangi	651	5.34

Zone 8 (Orleans/Cumberland)
Candidate	Votes	%
Sheryl MacDonald	Acclaimed	

Zone 9 (Rideau-Vanier/Capital)
Candidate	Votes	%
Lynn Graham	Acclaimed	

Zone 10 (Somerset/Kitchissippi)
Candidate	Votes	%
Joan Spice	7,205	51.08
Albert Chambers	4,561	32.33
David Allston	2,340	16.59

Zone 11 (River)
Candidate	Votes	%
Brian Gifford	6,165	87.27
Jeremy Sztuka	899	12.73

Zone 12 (Innes/Beacon Hill-Cyrville)
Candidate	Votes	%
David Moen	6,618	62.38
Maret Swayze	3,992	37.62

=== Ottawa-Carleton Catholic School Board Trustees ===
Zone 1 (West Carleton/Goulbourn/Rideau/Osgoode)
Candidate	Votes	%
John Curry	2,829	51.09
Cheryl Cross	2,708	48.91

Zone 2 (Kanata)
Candidate	Votes	%
Art Lamarche	2,663	68.95
Pat Gaudet-La Prairie	1,199	31.05

Zone 3 (Orleans/Cumberland)
Candidate	Votes	%
Des Curley	3,640	75.71
Walter Szyc	1,168	24.29

Zone 4 (Bell-South Nepean)
Candidate	Votes	%
June Flynn-Turner	3,384	73.25
Daniel Falcioni	1,236	26.75

Zone 5 (Beacon Hill-Cyrville/Innes)
Candidate	Votes	%
Jacqueline Legendre-McGuinty	2,620	61.36
Tim Weil	1,650	38.64

Zone 6 (Knoxdale-Merivale/Baseline)
Candidate	Votes	%
John Chiarelli	Acclaimed	

Zone 7 (Kitchissippi/Bay)
Candidate	Votes	%
Betty-Ann Kealey	2,820	58.06
Gord Butler	2,037	41.94

Zone 8 (Alta Vista/Gloucester-Southgate)
Candidate	Votes	%
Mark D. Mullan	3,026	50.14
Pat Bowie	2,420	40.10
Ernest Wheeler	589	9.76

Zone 9 (River/Capital)
Candidate	Votes	%
Kathy Ablett	2,151	46.97
Catherine Maguire-Urban	1,609	35.13
Andrew Scheer	820	17.90

Zone 10 (Rideau-Vanier/Rideau-Rockcliffe/Somerset)
Candidate	Votes	%
Thérèse Maloney Cousineau	Acclaimed	

=== Conseil des écoles catholiques de langue française du Centre-Est Trustees ===
Zone 4 (Bell-South Nepean/Kanata/West Carleton/Goulbourn/Rideau/Osgoode)
Candidate	Votes	%
Marie Biron	1,221	80.49
Alda Santos	296	19.41

Zone 5 (Bay/Baseline/Knoxdale-Merivale/Kitchissippi/River)
Candidate	Votes	%
Ronald Saumure	Acclaimed	

Zone 6 (Rideau-Vanier/Somerset)
Candidate	Votes	%
Diane Lemieux-Trudel	Acclaimed	

Zone 7 (Innes)
Candidate	Votes	%
Monique Briand	Acclaimed	

Zone 8 (Cumberland)
Candidate	Votes	%
Lise Cloutier	1,511	57.83
J. André Côté	1,102	42.17

Zone 9 (Orleans)
Candidate	Votes	%
Madelaine Chevalier	2,582	61.68
Claude Paquette	1,604	38.32

Zone 10 (Gloucester-Southgate/Capital/Alta Vista/Osgoode)
Candidate	Votes	%
Maureen Drouin	Acclaimed	

Zone 11 (Beacond Hill-Cyrville/Rideau-Rockcliffe)
Candidate	Votes	%
Maurice Lamirande	4,662	74.28
Pierre Jury	1,614	25.72

=== Conseil des écoles publiques de l'Est de l'Ontario Trustees ===
Zone 5 (Gloucester-Southgate/Cumberland/Osgoode)
Candidate	Votes	%
Louise Panneton	Acclaimed	

Zone 6 (Orleans)
Candidate	Votes	%
Yvon Ferrand	Acclaimed	

Zone 7 (Innes/Beacond Hill-Cyrville)
Candidate	Votes	%
Denis M. Chartrand	Acclaimed	

Zone 8 (Alta Vista/Rideau-Rockcliffe)
Candidate	Votes	%
Marielle Godbout	Acclaimed	

Zone 9 (Rideau-Vanier)
Candidate	Votes	%
Susan R. Copeland	Acclaimed	

Zone 10 (Somerset/Kitchissippi/River/Capital)
Candidate	Votes	%
Jean-Paul Lafond	Acclaimed	

Zone 11 (Bell-South Nepean/Kanata/West Carleton/Goulbourn/Bay/Baseline/Knoxdale-Merivale/Rideau)
Candidate	Votes	%
Bernard Bareilhe	Acclaimed	
