= Jean Cloutier =

Ottawa City Councillor
- In office December 1, 2014 – November 15, 2022
- Preceded by: Peter Hume
- Succeeded by: Marty Carr
- Constituency: Alta Vista Ward

Personal details
- Born: c. 1959
- Party: Independent
- Spouse: Sandra Cloutier

Jean L. Cloutier (born c. 1959) is a Canadian politician. He was the Ottawa City Councillor for Alta Vista Ward from 2014 to 2022. He was elected for the first time in the 2014 Ottawa municipal election.

Cloutier grew up in the Hintonburg neighbourhood of the city and has lived in Alta Vista since 1986.

Cloutier is a past president of the Canterbury Community Association, which covers Ottawa's former Canterbury Ward. A Chartered Professional Accountant, he was Controller at Tubman Funeral Homes for 12 years prior to being elected. In 1988, he and friend Brice White purchased the Nelson Cinema on Rideau Street and converted into the ByTowne Cinema.

Cloutier is a member of the choir at St François d'Assise and has a black belt in martial arts.

During the 2014 election campaign, he was endorsed by outgoing councillor Peter Hume, which helped him get elected, winning nearly 50% of the vote. Cloutier endorsed Jim Watson for mayor. He endorsed Watson again in 2018.

Cloutier was re-elected in the 2018 Ottawa municipal election, narrowly defeating Raylene Lang-Dion by 201 votes, winning 33 percent of the vote. Cloutier promised an "ambitious agenda" to make the "community stronger, vibrant, more resilient".

On January 27, 2022, he announced he would not run for re-election in the 2022 Ottawa municipal election.

Prior to being elected, he was a regular donor to the Liberal Party of Canada. He has also donated to Dalton McGuinty.

== Special rink levy ==
During his first term as councillor, Cloutier spearheaded the construction of an outdoor ice rink at the Canterbury Community Centre. The construction meant that a levy would have to be imposed on the property owners of his ward. It was only the fourth special levy instituted since Ottawa's amalgamation in 2001. Cloutier opposed holding a ward vote in Alta Vista on the proposed fee and held a single consultation meeting with the community.

== Steakhouse controversy ==
During the 2018 municipal election campaign, Cloutier's campaign manager, Peter Hume (Cloutier's predecessor) invited a number of developers to Al Steakhouse for a fundraiser for the Cloutier campaign. The fundraiser was controversial due to a new ban on corporate donations, though personal donations are still legal. Following the controversy, Cloutier opted to cancel the event.

== Criticisms of citizen transit commissioner ==
On November 10, 2019 Cloutier, who serves as the city's Transit Commission Vice-Chair criticized Sarah Wright-Gilbert, a voluntary member of Ottawa's Citizen Transit Commission who had been highlighting the frustrations of transit riders and the failures of the city's public transit service, OC Transpo especially with the problems with the launch of the new Confederation Line light rail system. Cloutier called her criticisms "unproductive" and that she should "[r]eflect on your objectives". Councillors Catherine McKenney and Jeff Leiper came to Wright-Gilbert's defence.
