= Allan Higdon =

Canadian politician (born 1947)

Allan L. Higdon

Acting Mayor of Ottawa
- In office September 6, 2000 – December 31, 2000
- Preceded by: Jim Watson
- Succeeded by: Bob Chiarelli

Ottawa City Councillor
- In office December 1, 1994 – December 31, 2000
- Preceded by: Peter Hume
- Succeeded by: Peter Hume
- Constituency: Alta Vista-Canterbury (Ward 10)

Personal details
- Born: 1947 (age 78–79) Dublin, Ireland
- Party: Progressive Conservative Party of Ontario
- Spouse: Willa Rea
- Education: Queen's University (BA); University of Toronto (BEd)

Allan L. Higdon (born 1947) is a former Ottawa City Councillor and acting mayor of Ottawa. He served on council from 1994 through 2000.

Born in Dublin, Ireland, Higdon immigrated to Canada with his family in 1957 and settled in Kingston, Ontario. He received a BA from Queen's University in English and History, a BEd from the University of Toronto, and also became an Associate of the Royal Conservatory of Music (ARCT).

After graduation, Higdon worked with the Canadian Institute of Mining and Metallurgy on a curriculum development project at the Ontario Institute for Studies in Education (OISE). He subsequently lived in Toronto and southeast Asia, later moving to Ottawa in 1980. After moving to Ottawa, he became a high school teacher, but quickly became involved in politics and started work on Parliament Hill, for Progressive Conservative Member of Parliament Jack Murta. In the 1984 Canadian federal election, he worked as the community communications co-ordinator at the Progressive Conservative national headquarters. Following the campaign, he served as Executive Assistant to Minister of National Revenue Otto Jelinek. Higdon then became a self-employed consultant specializing in social and demographic research and communications. From 1988 to 1994 he was employed as a Senior Analyst for the Department of Communications.

Active in local politics in the 1994 Ottawa municipal election, Higdon was elected to the Ottawa City Council representing the Alta Vista-Canterbury Ward. He was re-elected in the 1997 Ottawa municipal election by acclamation and appointed Deputy Mayor of Ottawa for the term 1997–2000.

After mayor Jim Watson's resignation as mayor, Higdon was appointed Acting Mayor of Ottawa on September 6, 2000. While in post he presented the Key to the City of Ottawa to Max Keeping and Margaret Atwood. Higdon was defeated in the 2000 Ottawa municipal election by regional councillor and fellow Conservative Peter Hume, following the amalgamation of the city and regional government. Losing by over 2,000 votes, Higdon blamed the media for his loss, suggesting it did not portray him in a positive light.

Following his defeat, Higdon began work for the Government of Ontario, working for the Alcohol and Gaming Commission of Ontario.

== Personal life ==
Higdon is a member of St. Luke's Anglican Church, and served on the executive committee of the Anglican Diocese of Ottawa. He has two children with his wife Willa.

| Preceded by Peter Hume (Alta Vista); Jack MacKinnon (Canterbury) | Councillor from Alta Vista-Canterbury Ward; 1994-2000 | Succeeded by Peter Hume |
