= Pat Doherty (Canadian politician) =

Canadian politician (1914–1973)

Patrick Doherty

Ottawa Alderman
- In office February 5, 1968 – December 31, 1972 Serving with Rudy Capogreco (until 1969) Joe Quinn (after 1969)
- Preceded by: James McAuley
- Succeeded by: Joe Quinn
- Constituency: Dalhousie Ward (until 1969); Gloucester Ward (after 1969)
- In office January 1, 1965 – December 31, 1966 Serving with Don Kay
- Preceded by: Murray Heit
- Succeeded by: James Knubley, Joe Quinn
- Constituency: Gloucester Ward
- In office January 1, 1961 – December 31, 1962 Serving with Murray Heit
- Preceded by: Alexander Roger
- Succeeded by: Don Kay
- Constituency: Gloucester Ward
- In office January 1, 1955 – December 31, 1958 Serving with Jim Groves (before 1956) Alexander Roger (after 1956)
- Preceded by: Alexander Roger
- Succeeded by: Murray Heit
- Constituency: Ward 1 (until 1956) Gloucester Ward (after 1956)
- In office January 1, 1951 – December 31, 1952 Serving with Archie Newman
- Preceded by: Alexander Roger
- Succeeded by: Jim Groves
- Constituency: Gloucester Ward

Personal details
- Born: 1914 Shawville, Quebec
- Died: December 15, 1973 Ottawa
- Party: Liberal Party of Canada

Patrick Kylie Doherty (1914 – December 15, 1973) was a Canadian politician. He served as an alderman on Ottawa City Council on and off again from 1951 to 1972.

== Early life ==
Doherty was the son of Henry Doherty and Gabriel O'Flaherty. Born in Shawville, Quebec, he moved to the Gloucester Township area as a child. He served in the Canadian Army for five and a half years in World War II.

Doherty ran for alderman in Gloucester Township in the 1948 municipal elections, but lost. He finished in fifth place on the three seat council, winning 1,491 votes, 607 votes behind third place. A large portion of Gloucester, including his home in the Ridgemont/Billings Bridge area was annexed into Ottawa in 1950.

== Alderman ==
Doherty was first elected to city council in the 1950 Ottawa municipal election, finishing second in Gloucester Ward in the two-seat race, winning a total of 2,203 votes. He unseated former Gloucester reeve Alexander Roger who had only just won the seat in a special election held in January when the ward was annexed into Ottawa. Doherty finished 262 votes behind Archie Newman who topped the poll. In 1952, he opened a service station and garage called "Doherty's Supertest" at the corner of Bank Street and Heron Road.

The annexation of parts of Nepean Township and Gloucester Township resulted in city council ballooning in size, and voters also chose to back a plebiscite to reduce the size of city council for the 1952 municipal election. Doherty's Gloucester Ward was merged with Rideau Ward creating a new ward called "Ward 1". All four aldermen from both wards ran for re-election in the new two-seat district. On election day, Doherty pulled 3,251 votes, finishing third behind the winners Jim Groves (3,699 votes) and Alexander Roger (who was appointed as Rideau's councillor in 1951), who won 3,384 votes. Groves' victory was a surprise, as he was not one of the four incumbents. Despite losing, Doherty finished ahead of Gloucester's other alderman, Archie Newman and Rideau's second alderman, Leslie Avery.

On October 20, 1954, Doherty announced he would be running again in Ward 1 for one of the two aldermanic seats in the 1954 election. His platform consisted of improving recreation (rinks, playgrounds, community centres), improving roads, and a more rapid extension of essential services. He endorsed former mayor E. A. Bourque's failed candidacy for the city's top job in that election. Alderman Roger did not run for re-election, paving an easier path for Doherty to get elected back to council. On election day, Doherty was elected, finishing in second place with 5,026 votes, 841 votes behind Groves who topped the poll. Following the election, Doherty was appointed to city council's Traffic Committee.

For the 1956 election, the city's wards were given names, usually reflecting the city's pre-1952 names. Furthermore, Ward 1 was split in half with the half north of Tremblay Road being named Rideau Ward, and the southern half becoming Gloucester Ward again. Ward 1 was divided because it had become overpopulated, and was by far the largest ward in the city in geographic size. Doherty, who supported the ward split, ran in Gloucester, while his seat mate, Groves, ran in Rideau. Doherty was re-elected, this time topping the poll with 2,268 votes. Alexander Roger was elected along with him, finishing second.

Doherty was one of the speakers at a rally for Liberal Member of Parliament Joseph-Omer Gour, who was running for re-election in the 1957 Canadian federal election.

Doherty cited his accomplishments over the 1957–58 term as improving the Hurdman and George Dunbar Bridges, "street paving, extension of sewers, water mains, sidewalks, road oilings, street lighting, mail services, recreation facilities and a new fire hall". Doherty lost his seat in the 1958 election. The race saw the election of dentist Murray Heit who topped the poll with 3,096 votes. Roger was re-elected with 2,912 votes, while Doherty placed third with 2,715 votes.

Doherty was the campaign manager for Fred Barrett, the Liberal candidate in Russell in the 1959 Ontario general election.

On November 3, 1960, Doherty announced he would run for alderman again in Gloucester ward in that year's municipal election. Doherty campaigned on 'more and better playgrounds and a covered rink with artificial ice', and claimed he had been 'instrumental in obtaining rinks, playgrounds, a firehall and a recreation centre' when had been an alderman. On election day, Doherty was elected back on to council, winning 3,478 votes, 726 votes behind Heit who topped the poll, and 285 ahead of alderman Roger, who finished third. Following his re-election, he said he would "work to bring the ward's recreational facilities up to the standards of the other wards" and "zoning those parts of the ward that are not already zoned". Beginning the 1961–62 council term, Doherty was named to the Tourist and Convention Committee and the Signs Committee. He would later become chairman of the building committee for the Island Lodge home for the aged. During the term, he opposed the building of low-rent housing on Station Boulevard in Riverview Park.

Doherty ran for re-election in the 1962 election. He was defeated, winning 6,119 votes, 254 votes behind second place candidate Don Kay. Heit was re-elected, topping the poll with 7,034 votes. In October 1964, Doherty announced he was going to run to get his seat on council back in the 1964 election. He indicated that his platform was for better roads and recreation facilities. On election day, he was elected back on to council, winning 7,301 votes, nearly 3,000 voted behind Kay who topped the poll. Alderman Heit was elected to city's Board of Control, freeing up the position.

In 1965, Doherty ran for the Liberal Party of Canada nomination in Russell against incumbent Member of Parliament Paul Tardif for the federal election that year. Tardif defeated Doherty 361 votes to 189.

During the 1965–66 term, Doherty was the vice chair of the traffic committee and continued to be a member of the tourist and convention committee. On November 1, 1966, he announced he was going to run for re-election in the 1966 election. The ward had been divided in half, and he chose to run in the southern half, which retained the name Gloucester. Doherty's seat mate, Don Kay chose to run in the northern half, which became Alta Vista Ward. On election day, Doherty was defeated after finishing third with 1,407 votes, only 53 votes behind second place Joe Quinn, who was elected on his third try. James Knubley topped the poll with 1,528 votes.

In 1967, he was elected as one of the directors of the Liberal riding association in the new riding of Ottawa—Carleton.

Doherty was appointed back to council in February 1968 following the resignation of James McAuley in Dalhousie Ward. City council appointed him after also considering 1966 third place candidate Gale Kerwin, fourth place Charles Brownlee and former alderman Charlie Parker. Doherty's council appointment was protested by residents of his new ward, many of whom thought Kerwin, should have been appointed instead. The opposition prompted the Board of Control to recommend that the provincial municipal affairs department set a new policy for filling vacancies with more than two years remaining in the term (elections were now every three years), through either a by-election or appointment of the third-place finisher. Following his appointment, he sat on the signs, civic procedures committee. and tourist and convention committee.

On October 6, 1969, Doherty announced he was running for re-election in the 1969 election, opting to run in Gloucester Ward, rather than face the voters in Dalhousie. He cited his desire to promote development of a downtown rapid transit system and full reconstruction of Bank Street, Heron Road and Riverside Drive as reasons for wanting to run. During the election, he called for "encouragement of regional government, ... extension of bus services and an end to long distance charges on telephone calls" within the city. On election day, Doherty was elected with 1,643 votes, over 1,000 votes behind alderman Quinn, the poll topper. Doherty began the 1970–72 term by being elected chair of the City Tourist and Convention Committee. At the end of the term, he decided to not run for re-election.

== Death ==
Doherty went to the Riverside Hospital on December 14, 1973, following a heart attack, and died the next day. He was unmarried. He was interred at Notre Dame Cemetery.

== Personal life ==
Doherty was a member of the Ottawa South Lions Club, the Royal Canadian Legion, St. Thomas Aquinas Parish, a member of the Junior Board of Trade, and a member of the Russell Liberal Association.
