= 1994 Ottawa municipal election =

Election in Ontario, Canada

1994 Ottawa mayoral election
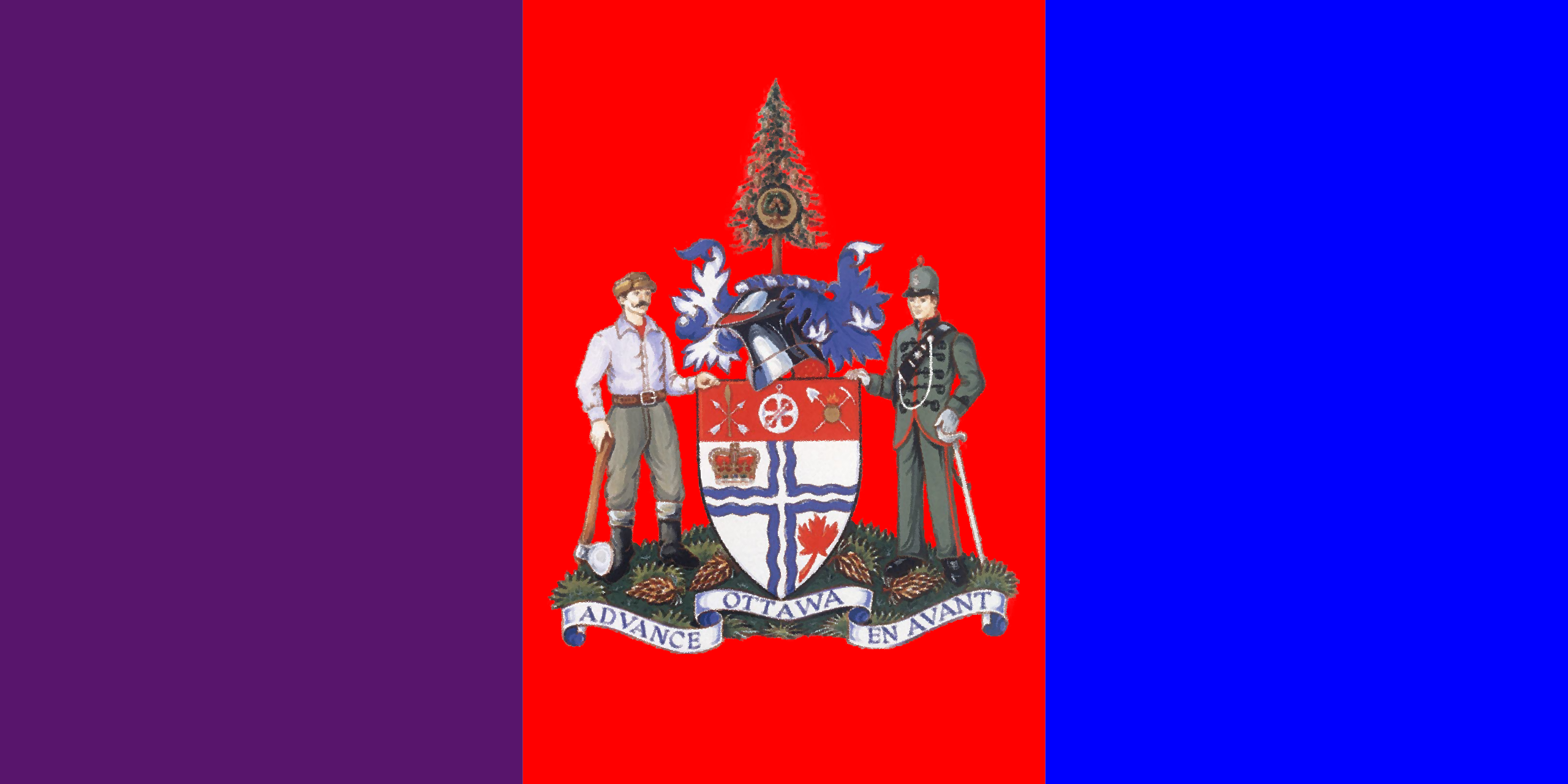
- November 14, 1994
Candidate	Jacquelin Holzman	Joan O'Neill	Tim Kehoe
Popular vote	34,082	28,748	24,773
Percentage	36.96%	31.18%	26.87%
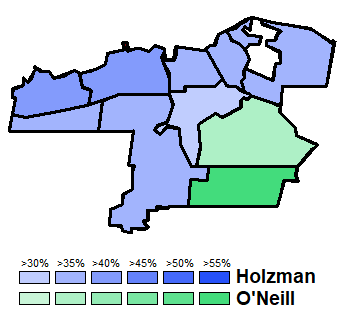
- Results by ward
Mayor before election
Jacquelin Holzman
Elected mayor
Jacquelin Holzman

The 1994 Ottawa municipal election was held on November 14, 1994, in Ottawa, Canada. The number of wards in the city had been reduced from 15 to 10 for this election. Mayor Jacquelin Holzman was re-elected in a three-way contest with councillors Joan O'Neill and Tim Kehoe.

== Mayoral election ==
Official Results

Candidate	Vote	%
Jacquelin Holzman (X)	34,082	36.96
Joan O'Neill	28,748	31.18
Tim Kehoe	24,773	26.87
Diane McIntyre	2,921	3.17
Alexander Saikaley	1,677	1.82

=== Results by ward ===
Despite the three way race, Holzman won all but two of the city's wards. She was particularly strong in the city's west end, with her best ward being Ward 1 (renamed Britannia-Richmond in 1995), which she had represented part of on council from 1982 to 1991. O'Neill won the remaining two wards, both in the city's south end. Her best ward was Ward 3 (renamed Southgate in 1995), which she had represented on council. Kehoe did not win any wards, but was strongest in the central part of the city, and came within 90 votes of winning Ward 5 (renamed Bruyère-Strathcona in 1995).

Ward	Holzman	O'Neill	Kehoe	McIntyre	Saikaley
Ward 1	4,722	2,637	2,854	248	97
Ward 2	2,356	1,548	1,987	120	45
Ward 3	1,611	3,521	733	130	134
Ward 4	3,472	2,376	2,767	363	151
Ward 5	2,006	1,342	1,916	265	86
Ward 6	3,388	1,900	2,931	446	171
Ward 7	4,465	3,072	3,089	313	132
Ward 8	4,022	3,906	2,285	280	235
Ward 9	3,364	3,202	3,008	461	97
Ward 10	4,676	5,244	3,203	295	529

== City council ==
City council was reduced from 15 to 10 seats (excluding the mayor), so elections were fought on a new map. Ward names were not adopted until 1995.

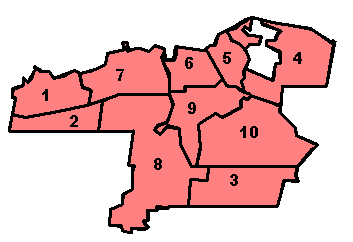
Map of Ottawa's Wards used in this election

Ward 1
Candidate	Votes	%
Ron Kolbus	4756	46.13
Gregory L. Ross	4030	39.09
Richard Kuzell	1523	14.77

Ward 2
Candidate	Votes	%
Brian Mackey	4206	70.45
Roberta Anderson	1764	29.55

Ward 3
Candidate	Votes	%
Diane Deans	2830	46.69
Gale McAuley	1708	28.18
Wayne MacKinnon	818	13.50
Khal Ishraki	637	10.51
Tony Tiefenbach	68	1.12

Ward 4
Candidate	Votes	%
Richard Cannings (X)	5122	57.73
Michael Green	2575	29.02
Brian Cunningham	1175	13.24

Ward 5
Candidate	Votes	%
Stéphane Émard-Chabot	2754	49.01
Pierre Bourque	1549	27.57
Eliseo Temprano	1149	20.45
Joseph Costisella	167	2.97

Ward 6
Candidate	Votes	%
Elisabeth Arnold	4529	50.48
Peter Harris (X)	4443	49.52

Ward 7
Candidate	Votes	%
Joan Wong (X)	5052	46.03
Shawn Little	3643	33.19
David Goldstein	2281	20.78

Ward 8
Candidate	Votes	%
Karin Howard	3645	35.02
Pat Murphy	3024	29.06
Fred Bowie	1468	14.11
Don Tudin	1085	10.43
Riley Brockington	535	5.14
Alan Murphy	390	3.75
Coreen Fast	260	2.50

Ward 9
Candidate	Votes	%
Jim Watson (X)	8851	89.18
Jim Carson	1074	10.82

Ward 10
Candidate	Votes	%
Allan Higdon	6401	46.83
Jack MacKinnon (X)	4057	29.68
Georges Jarbouh	1526	11.16
Patrick Basham	977	7.15
Robert White	489	3.58
J.J. Pawlak	218	1.59

== Ottawa Board of Education Trustees ==
The results for the Ottawa Board of Education trustees were as follows. This would be the final election for the OBE, which was merged with the Carleton Board of Education in 1998. The Zones were co-terminus with their respective wards, except for Zone 4 which also included the Village of Rockcliffe Park and Zone 5 which included the City of Vanier.

Zone 1	Vote	%
Bill Gowling	3,039	41.06
John Blatherwick	2,746	37.10
Angela Young	1,228	15.59
Chris Assad	388	5.24

Zone 2	Vote	%
Linda Hunter	Acclaimed	

Zone 3	Vote	%
Ted Best	1,892	50.25
Lynn Laide	1,873	49.75

Zone 4	Vote	%
Cynthia Bled	2,299	51.05
Jane Berman	1,507	33.47
John Milton	323	7.17
Jim Collison	190	4.22
Terry Bura	184	4.09

Zone 5	Vote	%
Deborah Morey	1,797	64.43
Richard Beaudry	992	35.57

Zone 6	Vote	%
Gerald Halpern	1,951	35.81
Walter Robinson	1,293	23.73
Frank Howard	1,194	21.92
Tim Stutt	1,010	18.54

Zone 7	Vote	%
Elda Allen	5,781	78.41
Francis Shelton	1,592	21.59

Zone 8	Vote	%
Andris Janson	2,119	32.62
Patti Bourassa	1,761	27.10
William J. Taylor	1,012	15.58
Dan Bascelli	546	8.40
Robert G. Smith	433	6.66
John Wright	401	6.17
Howard Stollery	225	3.46

Zone 9	Vote	%
Lynn Graham	4,912	70.20
David Hagerman	819	11.71
John Bond	474	6.77
Martin Drielsma	443	6.33
Dennis S. Orbay	349	4.99

Zone 10	Vote	%
Russ Jackson	3,551	43.01
Margaret Woodley	3,430	41.55
Richard Jackman	798	9.67
Nick Janna	300	3.63
Wayne Mannion	177	2.14
