= Pierre Benoit (Ontario politician) =

Canadian politician

50th Mayor of Ottawa
- In office 1972–1974
- Preceded by: Kenneth Hubert Fogarty
- Succeeded by: Lorry Greenberg

Ottawa Controller
- In office 1970–1972
- Preceded by: Kenneth Hubert Fogarty, Ellen Webber, Murray Heit
- Succeeded by: Garry Guzzo

Ottawa Alderman
- In office 1967–1969
- Preceded by: Pat Doherty (Gloucester Ward)
- Succeeded by: Jeffrey King
- Constituency: Alta Vista Ward

Personal details
- Born: March 2, 1939 Ottawa
- Party: Ontario Progressive Conservative Party

Joseph Jean Pierre Benoit (born March 2, 1939) was mayor of Ottawa from 1972 to 1974. He was a lawyer by career but subsequently pursued a variety of interests.

Benoit studied law at the University of Ottawa and played Canadian football with the Ottawa Gee-Gees from 1957 to 1961. He then practised law in the Ottawa area. He was mayor during the opening of the Main Branch of the Ottawa Public Library in 1974. After his term as mayor, he was a columnist for the Ottawa Journal, a French-language radio host CJRC and a political commentator on television CJOH, all in Ottawa. He later worked with Campeau Corporation in commercial and residential development. Later he served as an executive with VMS Realty Partners in Chicago, Illinois, following which he embarked on a career as a corporate turnaround specialist and financial advisor.

He unsuccessfully contested an Ontario by-election on 7 November 1974 in the Carleton East provincial electoral district as a Progressive Conservative candidate.

On 18 April 2008, he was inducted into the University of Ottawa Gee-Gees Hall of Fame as a two-way All-Star.

With Campeau Corporation and later with Greystone Investments, he was responsible for major real estate developments in Ottawa, Montreal, Regina, Oshawa and Calgary in Canada as well as in San Francisco, Los Angeles and Orange County, California; Houston, Dallas and Plano, Texas; and in Jupiter, Florida, aggregating more than $1.5 billion in total development costs.

With VMS Realty Partners he was one of the key executives charged with overseeing the restructuring and eventual liquidation of that $9.0 billion enterprise.

As a turnaround specialist and financial advisor he represented the bondholders in the restructuring and bankruptcy of House of Fabrics, a $500 mm + retail chain and served as chairman and chief restructuring officer of Murray Energy, a major coal producer. He also has represented bondholders and secured creditors as well as several Committees of Unsecured Creditors in a variety of industries

He currently serves on the board Interprise Design, a Dallas-based ESOP.

He resides in Scottsdale, Arizona.

His granddaughter, Amanda Kline, has followed in his footsteps, working as a broadcast journalist for CTV Montreal.

One of his nieces is former CBC radio journalist Avril Benoît.

Preceded by Don Kay and Pat Foherty (Gloucester Ward)	City councillors from Alta Vista Ward; 1966-1969 with Don Kay	Succeeded by Don Kay and Jeffrey King
