= Alta Vista Ward =

Alta Vista
- Location within Ottawa
- Coordinates: 45°24′N 75°39′W
- Country: Canada
- Province: Ontario
- City: Ottawa

Government
  - Councillor: Marty Carr

Area
  - Total: 20.3 km^{2} (7.8 sq mi)

Population (2016)Canada 2016 Census
  - Total: 42,410
  - Density: 2,090/km^{2} (5,410/sq mi)

Languages (2016)
  - English: 57.2%
  - French: 16.9%
  - Arabic: 6.4%
  - Somali: 2.2%
  - Spanish: 1.7%
  - Mandarin: 1.5%
  - Persian: 1.3%
  - Tagalog: 1.0%
- Avg. income: $34,941

Alta Vista Ward (Ward 18) is a city ward in the city of Ottawa, Ontario, Canada represented on Ottawa City Council. Alta Vista Ward was created prior to the 1966 election when Gloucester Ward was split in half due to population growth in the Alta Vista area. Until the 1972 elections, the ward was represented by two councillors (then called aldermen). Prior to the 1980 election, the Ward was split in half, with the western half remaining as Alta Vista ward and the eastern half became Canterbury Ward. They were reunited prior to the 1994 Election and was known as Ward 10, and given the name Alta Vista-Canterbury Ward in 1995. During this time, on regional council it was known as just Alta Vista Ward. It was renamed to Alta Vista in 2000.

The ward is located in Ottawa's southeast end, and covers the neighbourhoods of Eastway Gardens, Riverview, Alta Vista, Heron Gate and Sheffield Glen. The Ward is often advertised by candidates as "Alta Vista-Canterbury-Riverview", as there was a plan to name it that in 1997. The ward covers an area of 20.3 km^{2}. There is only a small boundary change for the 2006 election: the boundary will follow Highway 417 instead of the old city limits from Walkley north to the CPR right-of-way.

Until 2014, the ward was represented by Peter Hume. He defeated incumbent Allan Higdon in the 2000 election. It was a battle of incumbents, as Hume was a regional councillor until the Regional Municipality of Ottawa-Carleton was abolished. Jean Cloutier replaced Hume in 2014.

Key issues affecting the Alta Vista ward since 2000 have been: the proposed Alta Vista transportation corridor, the fate of the Canada Science and Technology Museum, as well as the O-Train expansion.

== Councillors ==
Council	Aldermen	
1967-69	Don Kay	Pierre Benoit
1970-72	Don Kay	Jeffrey King
1973-74	Don Kay	
1975-76	Don Kay	
1977-78	Don Kay	
1978-80	Don Kay	
1980-82	Greg MacDougall	
1982-85	Greg MacDougall	
1985-88	Darrel Kent	
1988-91	Darrel Kent	
1991-94	Peter Hume	
Council	City Councillor	Regional Councillor
1994-97	Allan Higdon	Peter Hume
1997-00	Allan Higdon	Peter Hume
Council	City Councillor	
2001-03	Peter Hume	
2003-06	Peter Hume	
2006-10	Peter Hume	
2010-14	Peter Hume	
2014-18	Jean Cloutier	
2018-22	Jean Cloutier	
2022-26	Marty Carr	
2026-30	Marty Carr	

== School trustees ==
- Ottawa-Carleton District School Board: Nili Kaplan-Myrth (resigned June 2025) (Zone 9, with Capital Ward)
- Ottawa Catholic School Board: Mark Mullan (Zone 8, with Gloucester-Southgate Ward)
- Conseil des écoles publiques de l'Est de l'Ontario: Marielle Godbout (Zone 9, with Rideau-Rockcliffe Ward)
- Conseil des écoles catholiques du Centre-Est: Monique Briand (Zone 10, with Gloucester-Southgate Ward and Osgoode Ward)

== Population data ==
The Ward's population was 46,500 in 2006 (estimate). At the Canada 2001 Census it had 44,435 people.

Languages (mother tongue)

1. English: 54.6%
2. French: 15.6%
3. Arabic: 7.9%
4. Spanish: 1.8%
5. Chinese: 1.6% (inc. Mandarin, Cantonese and Chinese)
6. Italian: 1.1%

Religion

1. Roman Catholic: 40.0%
2. Muslim: 11.7%
3. No religion: 11.4%
4. Anglican: 8.3%
5. United Church of Canada: 8.2%
6. Jewish: 2.0%
7. Presbyterian: 1.6%
8. Buddhist: 1.3%
9. Baptist: 1.3%
10. Pentecostal: 1.1%

Income

- Average household income: $64,697
- Average income: $34,941

== Election results ==
=== 1966 elections ===
- 2 elected

1966 Ottawa municipal election: City council
Candidate	Votes	%
Don Kay	6,879	37.49
Pierre Benoit	4,309	23.48
Jack Stanton	2,957	16.11
Ralph Stewart	2,645	14.41
Charles Kruger	1,560	8.50

=== 1969 elections ===
- 2 elected

1969 Ottawa municipal election: City and regional council
Candidate	Votes	%
Don Kay	6,914	39.36
Jeffrey King	6,419	36.54
Gwendeline Power-Binns	2,250	12.81
Ross Potter	1,982	11.28

=== 1972 elections ===
1972 Ottawa municipal election: City and regional council
Candidate	Votes	%
Don Kay	Acclaimed	

=== 1974 elections ===
1974 Ottawa municipal election: City and council
Candidate	Votes	%
Don Kay	4,596	57.27
Phil Graham	3,429	42.33

=== 1976 elections ===
1976 Ottawa municipal election: City and regional council
Candidate	Votes	%
Don Kay	3,702	54.07
Nancy McGee	3,145	45.93

=== 1978 elections ===
1978 Ottawa municipal election: City council and regional
Candidate	Votes	%
Don Kay	5,749	48.85
Keith Martin	3,571	30.35
Darrel Kent	2,448	20.80

=== 1980 elections ===
1980 Ottawa municipal election: City and regional council
Candidate	Votes	%
Greg MacDougall	2,927	43.38
Roy Bushfield	2,124	31.48
John Coe	1,005	14.90
Fern Payne	691	10.24

=== 1982 elections ===
1982 Ottawa municipal election: City and regional council
Candidate	Votes	%
Greg MacDougall	6,413	79.31
Earle MacPhail	1,673	20.69

=== 1985 elections ===
Dylan McGuinty (brother of future Ontario premier Dalton McGuinty) lost to Tory Darrel Kent.

1985 Ottawa municipal election: City and regional council
Candidate	Votes	%
Darrel Kent	2,927	36.57
Dylan McGuinty	2,725	34.05
Angie Herzog	1,831	22.87
Phil Massad	353	4.41
Rebecca Liff	169	2.11

=== 1988 elections ===
1988 Ottawa municipal election: City and regional council
Candidate	Votes	%
Darrel Kent	ACCLAIMED	

=== 1991 elections ===
1991 Ottawa municipal election: City and regional council
Candidate	Votes	%
Peter Hume	4,660	55.80
Stephen Amesse	2,827	33.85
Rebecca Liff	865	10.36

=== 1994 elections ===
1994 Ottawa municipal election: City council
Candidate	Votes	%
Allan Higdon	6,401	46.83
Jack MacKinnon	4,057	29.68
Georges Jarbouh	1,526	11.16
Patrick Basham	977	7.15
Robert White	489	3.58
J.J. Pawlak	218	1.59

RMOC elections, 1994: Regional council
Candidate	Votes	%
Peter Hume	11,142	82.66
Rebecca Liff	1,172	8.69
Sean Abdallah	1,166	8.65

=== 1997 elections ===
1997 Ottawa municipal election: City council
Candidate	Votes	%
Allan Higdon	ACCLAIMED	

RMOC elections, 1997: Regional council
Candidate	Votes	%
Peter Hume	6,277	65.32
Patricia O'Reilly	2,383	24.80
John Yarmo	657	6.84
John Wiebe	239	3.05

=== 2000 Ottawa municipal election ===
City council
Candidate	Votes	%
Peter Hume	8,625	55.67
Allan Higdon	6,345	40.96
Ahmed Mohamed Nor	522	3.37

Ottawa Mayor (Ward results)
Candidate	Votes	%
Bob Chiarelli	9,410	60.48
Claudette Cain	5,387	34.62
Georges Saade	449	2.89
Marc-André Belair	93	0.60
James A. Hall	54	0.35
Ken Mills	48	0.31
John Turmel	48	0.31
Paula Nemchin	37	0.24
Morteza Naini	34	0.22

=== 2003 Ottawa municipal election ===
2003 Ottawa municipal election: City council
Candidate	Votes	%
Peter Hume	ACCLAIMED	

Ottawa Mayor (Ward results)
Candidate	Votes	%
Bob Chiarelli	5,382	56.90
Terry Kilrea	3,421	36.17
Ike Awgu	247	2.61
Ron Burke	117	1.24
John A. Bell	103	1.09
Paula Nemchin	66	0.70
John Turmel	66	0.70
Donna Upson	56	0.59

=== 2006 Ottawa municipal election ===
After running unopposed in 2003, Hume is facing off against Perry Marleau, (a civil servant with the Department of Foreign Affairs and International Trade) Ismael Lediye, notable in the Somali-Canadian community, Yusef Al Mezel (President of the Canadian Auto Workers Union Local 1688), Ahmed Ibrahim, an engineer, and Jim Ryan, a retired Bell Canada and Nortel employee.

2006 Ottawa municipal election: City council
Candidate	Votes	%
Peter Hume	10,433	69.53
James Ryan	1,955	13.03
Perry Marleau	1,190	7.93
Yusef Al Mezel	1,063	7.08
Ahmed Ibrahim	224	1.49
Ismael Lediye	141	0.94

Ottawa Mayor (Ward results)
Candidate	Votes	%
Larry O'Brien	6,784	44.25
Alex Munter	5,319	34.70
Bob Chiarelli	3,055	19.93
Jane Scharf	78	0.51
Robert Larter	45	0.29
Piotr Anweiler	36	0.23
Barkley Pollock	13	0.08

=== 2010 Ottawa municipal election ===
2010 Ottawa municipal election: City council
Candidate	Votes	%
Peter Hume	7,553	59.49
Clinton Cowan	2,374	18.70
Ernie Lauzon	1,851	14.58
Kevin Hogan	919	7.24

Ottawa Mayor (Ward results)
Candidate	Votes	%
Jim Watson	6,666	51.44
Larry O'Brien	2,672	20.62
Clive Doucet	2,114	16.31
Andrew S. Haydon	801	6.18
Mike Maguire	265	2.04
Idris Ben-Tahir	89	0.69
Robert G. Gauthier	74	0.57
Charlie Taylor	60	0.46
Cesar Bello	58	0.45
Jane Scharf	52	0.40
Samuel Wright	22	0.17
Robin Lawrance	15	0.12
Sean Ryan	15	0.12
Julio Pita	13	0.10
Joseph Furtenbacher	12	0.09
Daniel J. Lyrette	9	0.07
Robert Larter	8	0.06
Michael St. Arnaud	8	0.06
Vincent Libweshya	5	0.04
Fraser Liscumb	2	0.02

=== 2014 Ottawa municipal election ===
City council
Candidate	Vote	%
Jean Cloutier	5,295	47.37
Clinton Cowan	3,287	29.40
Hussein Mahmoud	1,600	14.31
Daher Muse Calin	263	2.35
Brandon Scharfe	195	1.74
Jeff Dubois	169	1.51
Perry Marleau	159	1.42
Adam Bowick	112	1.00
John Redins	99	0.89

Ottawa mayor (Ward results)
Candidate	Vote	%
Jim Watson	8,766	79.08
Mike Maguire	1,719	15.51
Anwar Syed	228	2.06
Rebecca Pyrah	105	0.95
Darren W. Wood	74	0.67
Robert White	72	0.65
Michael St. Arnaud	65	0.59
Bernard Couchman	56	0.51

=== 2018 Ottawa municipal election ===
City council
Council candidate	Vote	%
Jean Cloutier	3,866	32.81
Raylene Lang-Dion	3,665	31.10
Kevin Kit	2,616	22.20
Clinton Cowan	1,415	12.01
John Redins	127	1.08
Mike McHarg	84	0.80

Ottawa mayor (Ward results)
Candidate	Vote	%
Jim Watson	7,898	69.86
Clive Doucet	2,729	24.14
Bruce McConville	147	1.30
Hamid Alakozai	88	0.78
Craig MacAulay	86	0.76
Joey Drouin	81	0.71
Ahmed Bouragba	75	0.66
Moises Schachtler	52	0.46
Ryan Lythall	50	0.44
James T. Sheahan	43	0.38
Michael Pastien	34	0.30
Bernard Couchman	23	0.20

=== 2022 Ottawa municipal election ===
City council
Council candidate	Vote	%
Marty Carr	6,088	47.12
Carolyn Kropp	4,107	31.79
Bob Perkins	2,453	18.99
Angelo Gino Scaffidi	271	2.10

Ottawa mayor (Ward results)
Candidate	Vote	%
Mark Sutcliffe	5,757	45.96
Catherine McKenney	5,417	43.25
Bob Chiarelli	655	5.23
Nour Kadri	329	2.63
Mike Maguire	83	0.66
Graham MacDonald	64	0.51
Brandon Bay	46	0.37
Param Singh	43	0.34
Celine Debassige	34	0.27
Jacob Solomon	23	0.18
Zed Chebib	20	0.16
Gregory Jreg Guevara	19	0.15
Bernard Couchman	18	0.14
Ade Olumide	18	0.14

=== 2026 Ottawa municipal election ===
2026 Ottawa municipal election: Alta Vista
Candidate	Popular vote			Expenditures
Candidate	Votes	%	±%	Expenditures
Marty Carr (X)	8,256	66.62		
Derek McSweeney	1,867	15.06		
Elsa Niyongabo	1,193	9.63		
Tressy El-Hawi	802	6.47		
Muhyadin Omar Barkhat	275	2.22		
Total valid votes	12,699			
Total rejected, unmarked and declined votes				
Turnout		36.25		
Eligible voters	35,029			
Note: Candidate campaign colours are based on the prominent colour used in campaign items (signs, literature, etc.) and are used as a visual differentiation between candidates.
