= Marty Carr =

Canadian politician

Ottawa City Councillor
- Incumbent
- Assumed office November 15, 2022
- Preceded by: Jean Cloutier
- Constituency: Alta Vista Ward

Personal details
- Born: December 15, 1972 (age 53)
- Spouse: Christian McPherson
- Children: 2
- Education: Université Laval; University of Alberta

Martha Carr (born December 15, 1972) is a politician in Ontario, Canada. She is the city councillor for Alta Vista Ward on Ottawa City Council.

== Background ==
Carr was born in 1972 to parents Russell and Susan, and grew up in Prince Edward County. In grade 5, she moved to Edmonton and would attend the University of Alberta, where she received a Bachelor's in French. She then attended Université Laval where she received a Master's in Linguistics in French. While a student at Laval, she met her husband Christian. She moved to Ottawa in 1999, settling in the Alta Vista area in 2004.

Prior to being elected, Carr was a director in the Department of Justice. She also served the president of the Alta Vista Community Association for almost four years. Carr previously worked for the Canada Border Services Agency.

== Politics ==
In 2018, Carr unsuccessfully ran for the role of Ottawa-Carleton District School Board trustee in Ward 6. She placed second with 4,216 votes (34.60%) behind incumbent Chris Ellis.

In the 2022 Ottawa City Council election, Carr was elected on a platform of road repairs, keeping community facilities up-to-date, fixing transit routes, improving active transportation connectivity and roads, and boosting the ward's tree canopy.

During her term as city councillor, Carr has publicly advocated for the municipal government to address homelessness and food insecurity.

== Electoral record ==
2022 Ottawa municipal election: Alta Vista Ward
Candidate	Popular vote			Expenditures
Candidate	Votes	%	±%	Expenditures
Marty Carr	6,088	47.12	–	$15,185.28
Carolyn Kropp	4,107	31.79	–	$22,624.30
Bob Perkins	2,453	18.99	–	$13,518.92
Angelo Gino Scaffidi	271	2.10	–	$2,829.47
Total valid votes	12,919	96.70		
Total rejected, unmarked and declined votes	441	3.30		
Turnout	13,360	43.09		
Eligible voters	31,008			
Note: Candidate campaign colours are based on the prominent colour used in campaign items (signs, literature, etc.) and are used as a visual differentiation between candidates.

2018 Ottawa municipal election: OCDSB Zone 6
Zone 6	Vote	%
Chris Ellis (X)	5,883	48.28
Marty Carr	4,216	34.60
Tanya Melissa Dasilva	2,085	17.11
