= Hawthorne Public School (Ottawa) =

Location
- 2158 St Laurent Blvd; Ottawa, Ontario; 45.392055°N 75.620087°W

Information
- Type: Public
- Motto: Your Future is Now
- Established: 1899
- Principal: Diane Merhi
- Faculty: 34
- Enrollment: 300
- Website: https://hawthorneps.ocdsb.ca/

Hawthorne Public School is a school in Ottawa, Ontario, Canada. It is located at 2158 St. Laurent Blvd and represents around 210 students from Kindergarten to Grade Eight from over 50 countries around the world. Hawthorne Public School is home to many programs, including English as a Second Language (ESL), the General Learning Program (GLP), Special Education (SELC) and the Gifted Program.

== History ==
Hawthorne has a history that dates back to 1859, when the settlers of Green's Corners, a farming village southeast of Ottawa, built a small log schoolhouse. It was replaced in 1873 by a wood-frame structure, and probably became known as the Graham Schoolhouse. In 1873, the village postmaster chose to rename the village "Hawthorne," but it is not known exactly when the name became attached to the schoolhouse, which had also been known as School Section # 16 (SS #16) since 1859. It is clear that by the time that a new, red-brick building was constructed by John Alexander in 1899, it was called Hawthorne Public School. Each of the three schoolhouses had been in slightly different locations within the village, which was centred on the intersection of Walkley, Russell and Hawthorne Roads. The one-room schoolhouse of 1899 served the area until January 1961, when the current two-storey, multi-classroom school opened on St. Laurent Blvd. to serve what was by then a burgeoning suburb. The official opening was held in February 1963. The school initially included Grades 1 through 6, but in 1968 a new wing opened for Grade 7 and 8 students.

== Athletics ==
Hawthorne is known for its strong athletic program. In the City Wide Regional Athletics Olympics, Hawthorne has won several times. This is mainly attributed to Hawthorne's strong gifted program, with the only competition being Glashan and Katimavik Public School. For the past two years, Hawthorne has sent a team to the provincial Athletic Olympics. For the past several years, Hawthorne has also sent many students to the Regional Nationals Olympics, with many award recipients. Hawthorne has also sent some teams to the All Science Challenge, a local science-trivia competition between citywide grade 7s and 8s. However, due to the lack of high schools with a gifted program near the school, most children coming out of the gifted program end up using cross-boundary transfers to attend other schools. High schools that Hawthorne students attend after graduation include Lisgar, Bell, Merivale, Colonel By, Canterbury, Hillcrest, Brookfield and Ridgemont.

In 2006, a book called Hawthorne Writes was published with the help of fundraising and donations from the families of children involved with the project. The book featured stories written by students of Hawthorne in the format of the popular series "Chicken Soup." Stories in the book came from a large array of grades from grade 1 to grade 8, with stories written by faculty as well. The stories were then translated into many different languages by parents, teachers and students in order to promote and display the school's multiculturalism. After completing their stories students were able to choose an available language to translate their story into. Languages included English, Somali, Arabic, French, Chinese, Spanish, and Romanian. Media coverage was present from many different stations. Every student got to take home a copy of the Hawthorne Writes book in exchange for a donation of $8 or more (although the donation was technically optional, it was encouraged nonetheless).

== Athletics ==
Hawthorne Public School had a streak from 2001-2007 and 2009 where they won the Regional Championship gold medal(s) in the Southeast Region of the Ottawa Carleton Elementary Athletic Association every year..
