= Claude Bennett =

Canadian politician (1936–2020)

Ontario MPP
- In office 1971–1987
- Preceded by: Irwin Haskett
- Succeeded by: Dalton McGuinty, Sr.
- Constituency: Ottawa South

Ottawa Controller (Note: Serving with Pierre Benoit, Lorry Greenberg and Ernie Jones.)
- In office January 1, 1970 – August 28, 1972
- Preceded by: Kenneth Hubert Fogarty, Ellen Webber, Murray Heit
- Succeeded by: Tom McDougall

Ottawa Alderman (Note: 1960-1969 with Don Armstrong (1960-1964) and Charlotte Whitton (1964-1969).)
- In office January 1, 1961 – December 31, 1969
- Preceded by: George Sloan
- Succeeded by: Gary Guzzo
- Constituency: Capital Ward

Acting (Deputy) Mayor of Ottawa
- In office January 1, 1970 – August 28, 1972
- Preceded by: Kenneth Hubert Fogarty
- Succeeded by: Ernie Jones

Personal details
- Born: Claude Frederick Bennett; September 19, 1936 Ottawa, Ontario, Canada
- Died: March 20, 2020 (aged 83) Ottawa, Ontario, Canada
- Party: Progressive Conservative
- Occupation: Insurance agent

Claude Frederick Bennett (September 19, 1936 – March 20, 2020) was a politician in Ontario, Canada. He served in the Legislative Assembly of Ontario from 1971 to 1987, and as cabinet minister in the governments of Bill Davis and Frank Miller. He was a Progressive Conservative Party member.

== Background ==
Bennett was born in Ottawa, Ontario. He was educated at the High School of Commerce and worked as an insurance agent. He also served as director of the Central Canada Exhibition Association from 1965 to 1978 and was president of the Ottawa Sooner Jr. Football Club from 1965 to 1973.

== Politics ==
He served as an alderman and city controller in Ottawa from 1961 to 1969, having first been elected to city council in 1960. He was the city's acting mayor in the period from 1970 to 1972.

Bennett was elected to the Ontario legislature in the 1971 provincial election, winning a convincing victory in Ottawa South. He served concurrently as MPP and on the Ottawa Board of Control before resigning as controller in August 1972 following the passing of a provincial law forbidding MPPs to serve on municipal councils at the same time. He was appointed as a Minister without portfolio in Davis's government on September 28, 1972, and was promoted to Minister of Industry and Tourism on January 15, 1973. He was re-elected by a reduced majority in the 1975 election, and again with a convincing majority in 1977. On January 21, 1978, he was named Minister of Housing.

After six years of governing in a minority parliament, Davis's PCs were returned with a majority government in the 1981 election. Bennett was again returned for Ottawa South, and was named Minister of Municipal Affairs and Housing. He served in this position for the remainder of the Davis years.

Bennett was on the right wing of the Progressive Conservative party and was a prominent supporter of Frank Miller at the party's January 1985 leadership convention. When Miller became Premier of Ontario on February 8, 1985, he named Bennett as his Minister of Tourism and Recreation.

The PCs were reduced to a tenuous minority government under Miller's leadership in the 1985 provincial election, and Bennett retained his seat by only 1,337 votes (39.4%) against Liberal Party challenger Andrew Caddell (35.3%). He continued to serve as Minister of Tourism and Recreation and was also named Chair of Cabinet, but he accomplished little in this position before the Miller government was defeated in the house in June 1985. In opposition, Bennett served as his party's Critic for Industry and Trade. He supported Larry Grossman for the party leadership in November 1985, and did not run for re-election in 1987.

=== Cabinet positions ===
Miller ministry, Province of Ontario (1985)
Cabinet post (1)
Predecessor	Office	Successor
Reuben Baetz	Minister of Tourism and Recreation; 1985 (February–June)	John Eakins
Davis ministry, Province of Ontario (1971–1985)
Cabinet posts (3)
Predecessor	Office	Successor
John Rhodes	Minister of Municipal Affairs and Housing (Note: Known as Minister of Housing from 1978-1981.); 1978–1985	Dennis Timbrell
John White	Minister of Industry and Tourism; 1973–1978	John Rhodes
Sub-Cabinet Post
Predecessor	Title	Successor
	Minister Without Portfolio (1972–1973); Responsible for the North Pickering Development Project (Airport Lands)	

== Corporate appointments and death ==
From 1990 to 1995, Bennett served as chairman of the board for the Canada Mortgage and Housing Corporation. He was president of the Commonwealth Games Association of Canada since 1998 and also served as chair of the Ottawa Transition Board and the Ottawa Airport Authority. On June 29, 2007, he was appointed to sit on the board of directors of the Royal Canadian Mint for a four-year term.

Bennett died in the early morning of March 20, 2020, from a heart attack.
