= Queensboro Ward =

Former municipal ward in the city of Ottawa, Canada

Queensboro Ward is a former municipal ward in the city of Ottawa, Canada.

In 1950, what is now Ottawa's Westboro neighbourhood was annexed from Nepean Township. This area would be named Westboro Ward for just two years. In 1952, the size of Ottawa City Council was decreased, and the area became known as Ward 8 which eventually became Queensboro Ward in 1956. It was given this name by combining "Queensway" with "Westboro". In 1991, the ward changed names to Carlington-Westboro Ward before it was merged with Elmdale Ward to become Kitchissippi Ward in 1994.

Queensboro Ward traditionally consisted of Ottawa's Westboro neighbourhood and Carlington neighbourhood. Its eastern boundary was Island Park Drive and Fisher Avenue, whilst its western boundary varied. Clyde Avenue was its usual southwestern boundary, but its northwestern boundary varied from Golden Avenue to Fraser Avenue.

== City councillors ==
- Ernie Jones (1950-1952)
- Harry Parslow (1950-1954)
- Lon Campbell (1953-1960)
- Richard Barber (1955-1958)
- Ken Workman (1959-1972)
- Kenneth Fogarty (1961-1964)
- Harold Waddell (1965-1970)
- Ed Mulkins (1970-1974)
- Trip Kennedy (1975-1980)
- Terrance Denison (1980-1985)
- Mark Maloney (1985-1994)
- Mary Hegan (1994)

== Election results ==
=== 1949 special election ===
City council
Candidate	Votes	%
Harry Parslow	1,193	40.45
Ernest W. Jones	1,189	40.32
Harry Barnes	567	19.23
