= Don Kay (politician) =

Ottawa Alderman
- In office 1963–1980
- Preceded by: Pat Doherty
- Succeeded by: Greg MacDougall (Alta Vista); Darrel Kent (Canterbury)
- Constituency: Gloucester Ward (until 1966); Alta Vista Ward (from 1966)

Personal details
- Born: c. 1915 Toronto
- Died: April 2, 2007
- Party: Progressive Conservative
- Spouse(s): Audrey Hassall (m. 1945; died 2001); Patricia-Ann Johnston
- Children: 2

Donald Charles Kay (c. 1915 – April 2, 2007) was an alderman on Ottawa City Council for 18 years.

Kay attended McGill University with the intention of becoming a United Church minister. He served in World War II as an artillery signals instructor for the Canadian Army.

Before entering politics, Kay was an administrative officer for the Federal Post Office Department. He was also the chairman of the council of the Community Association of Southeast Ottawa. He was also the first Vice President of the Elmvale Acres-Urbandale Community Association. Later on in his career, he was a regional representative of the Public Service Alliance.

Kay first ran for council in the 1954 election, running in Ward 3 which covered Sandy Hill and Old Ottawa East. He finished fifth, winning 711 votes. He ran again in 1960 in Gloucester Ward, placing fourth. In his third attempt, the following election, Kay would be elected, unseating incumbent Pat Doherty for the second elected position in Gloucester Ward. Kay represented Gloucester Ward until 1966, when he was elected in the new Alta Vista Ward. In 1968, he also became a regional councillor in addition to sitting on Ottawa City Council. In 1975, he became the Dean of the City Council. In the 1980 election, Kay was defeated in the new Canterbury Ward by Conservative school teacher Darrel Kent. Kay had been charged for public mischief after one of Kent's signs was vandalized after a night of drinking. He was discharged.

== Sources ==
- Ottawa Citizen, December 1, 1962
- Ottawa Citizen, December 2, 1974
- Ottawa Citizen, November 11, 1980
