= Kenneth Fogarty =

Canadian judge

49th Mayor of Ottawa
- In office January 1, 1970 – April 4, 1972
- Preceded by: Donald Bartlett Reid
- Succeeded by: Pierre Benoit

Ottawa Controller
- In office 1965–1969
- Preceded by: Donald Bartlett Reid, Jules Morin
- Succeeded by: Claude Bennett, Pierre Benoit, Lorry Greenberg

Ottawa Alderman
- In office 1961–1964
- Preceded by: Lon Campbell
- Succeeded by: Harold Waddell
- Constituency: Queensboro Ward

Personal details
- Born: Kenneth Hubert Fogarty; 1923 Ottawa
- Died: 14 January 1989 (aged 65–66) Ottawa
- Party: Ontario Liberal Party

Kenneth Hubert Fogarty, QC (1923 – 14 January 1989) was Mayor of Ottawa, Ontario, Canada, from 1970 to 1972 and afterwards an Ontario district court judge until his death.

Fogarty was born in Ottawa, where he earned Bachelor of Arts and Master of Arts degrees at the University of Ottawa. He became a lawyer in 1950 after graduating from Osgoode Hall Law School in 1948. He returned to the University of Ottawa to study for his Master of Laws degree in French which he attained in 1969.

He ran for the Ontario Liberal Party in the riding of Ottawa South in the 1951 and 1955 provincial elections, losing both times. He represented Queensboro Ward on Ottawa City Council from 1961 to 1965. He then served on the Ottawa Board of Control from 1965 to 1970.

He died aged 65 in an Ottawa hospital due to cardiac failure.

Preceded by Lon Campbell, Ken Workman	Alderman from Queensboro Ward; 1960-1964; With Ken Workman	Succeeded by Harold Waddell, Ken Workman
