= Geography of Ottawa =

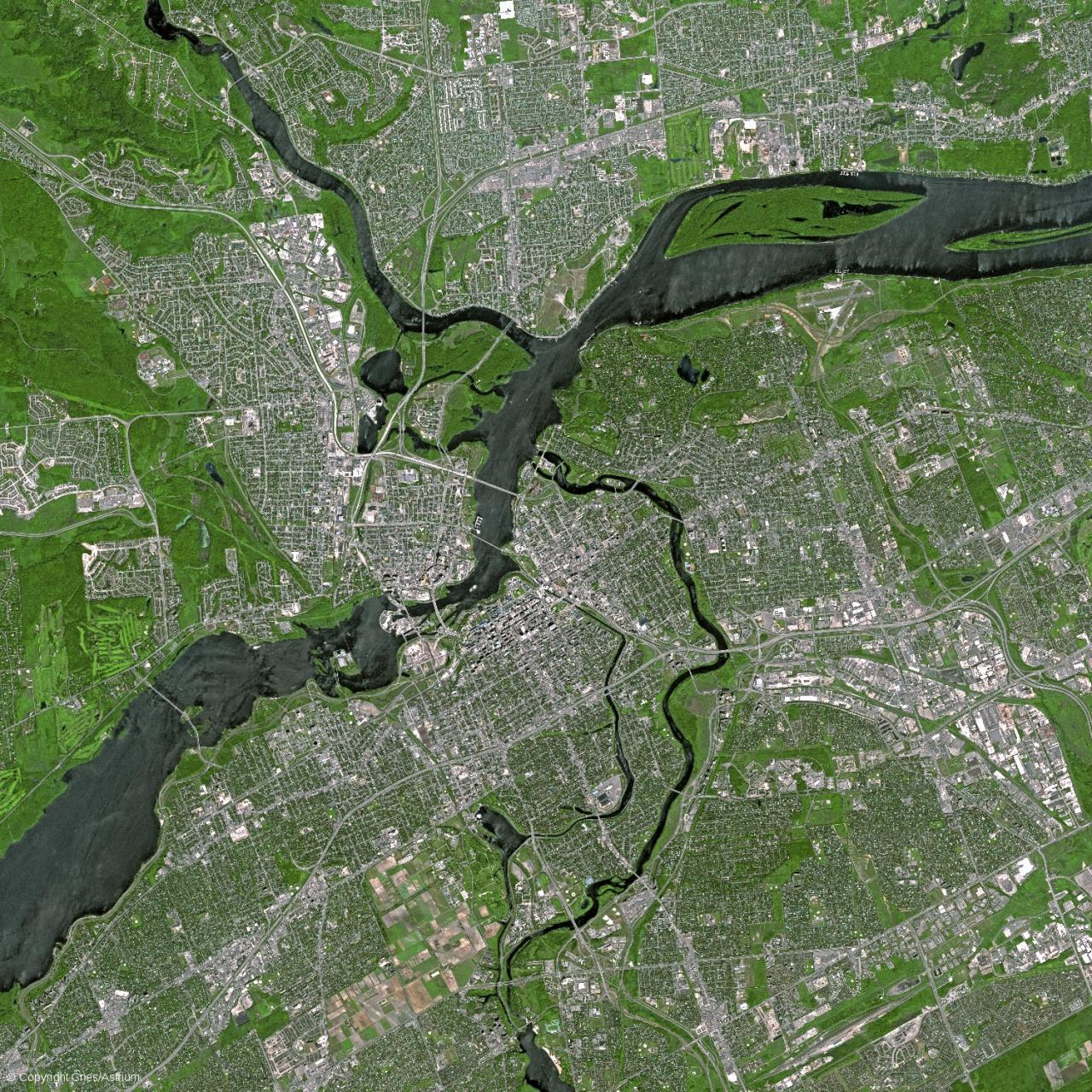
National Capital Region by SPOT Satellite in 2003

This is the outline of the geography of the city of Ottawa, the capital of Canada. Ottawa's current borders were formed in 2001, when the former city of Ottawa amalgamated with the ten other municipalities within the former Regional Municipality of Ottawa–Carleton. Ottawa is now a single-tiered census division, home to 1,017,449 people.

The city centre is located at the confluence of the Ottawa and Rideau Rivers. The Ottawa River forms the entire northern boundary of the city which it shares with the province of Quebec's municipalities of Pontiac and Gatineau. The northern boundary begins in the west at Arnprior and continues east to Rockland. The boundary then turns south in a straight line, separating the former Township of Cumberland (now in Ottawa) and the City of Clarence-Rockland. It then turns west in another straight line separating the former Township of Cumberland with the municipalities of The Nation and Russell. It then turns south separating Russell from the former Township of Osgoode (now in Ottawa). That boundary runs south in a straight line, then turns west separating Osgoode from the municipality of North Dundas. That boundary runs west in a straight line before turning north separating Osgoode from the municipality of North Grenville. This is another straight line, running north until the Rideau River near Kemptville. The boundary follows the river upstream until almost reaching Merrickville. The boundary then runs in a northwest direction in a straight line with a number of jogs. It separates the municipalities of Montague, Beckwith and Mississippi Mills from the former townships of Marlborough, Goulbourn, Huntley and Fitzroy.

== Topography ==
The highest point in Ottawa is 166 m (545 ft) above sea level, and is located 2.6 km (1.6 mi) SSE of Manion Corners (45°14′05″N 76°03′03″W). The lowest point in the city is the Ottawa River, at 44 m (144 ft) above sea level.

=== Highest points by ward ===
Map of Ottawa showing urban area, highways, waterways, and historic townships

Ward	Highest point	Elevation (approx.)
West Carleton-March Ward	2.6 km (1.6 mi) SSE of Manion Corners	166 m (545 ft)
Rideau-Jock Ward	8 km (5.0 mi) N of Munster on Jinkinson Road	153 m (502 ft)
Kanata South Ward	Glen Cairn Reservoir	131 m (430 ft)
College Ward	Khymer Court	129 m (423 ft)
Stittsville Ward	Rockson Crescent	128 m (420 ft)
Kanata North Ward	Huntsville Drive	126 m (413 ft)
Osgoode Ward	1 km (0.62 mi) SE of Bank Street at Rideau Road	120 m (390 ft)
Cumberland Ward	Cumberland Ridge Drive	120 m (390 ft)
Barrhaven Ward	Cedarview Road	120 m (390 ft)
Gloucester-Southgate Ward	Tom Roberts Avenue	119 m (390 ft)
Knoxdale-Merivale Ward	Cedarview Road at Cedarhill Drive	115 m (377 ft)
River Ward	Carlington Hill	115 m (377 ft)
Bay Ward	Wesley Clover Parks	114 m (374 ft)
Gloucester-South Nepean Ward	Osgoode Link Pathway at High Road	114 m (374 ft)
Innes Ward	200 m (660 ft) WSW of Forest Ridge Pumping Station	114 m (374 ft)
Beacon Hill-Cyrville Ward	Quarry Park	113 m (371 ft)
Rideau-Rockcliffe Ward	Foxview Place	106 m (348 ft)
Alta Vista Ward	Alta Vista Drive at Randall Avenue	102 m (335 ft)
Capital Ward	Bank Street at Alta Vista Drive	96 m (315 ft)
Orléans Ward	Clearcrest Crescent	93 m (305 ft)
Kitchissippi Ward	Maitland Avenue Bridge	89 m (292 ft)
Somerset Ward	Parliament Hill	86 m (282 ft)
Rideau-Vanier Ward	Richelieu Park	75 m (246 ft)

== Geology ==
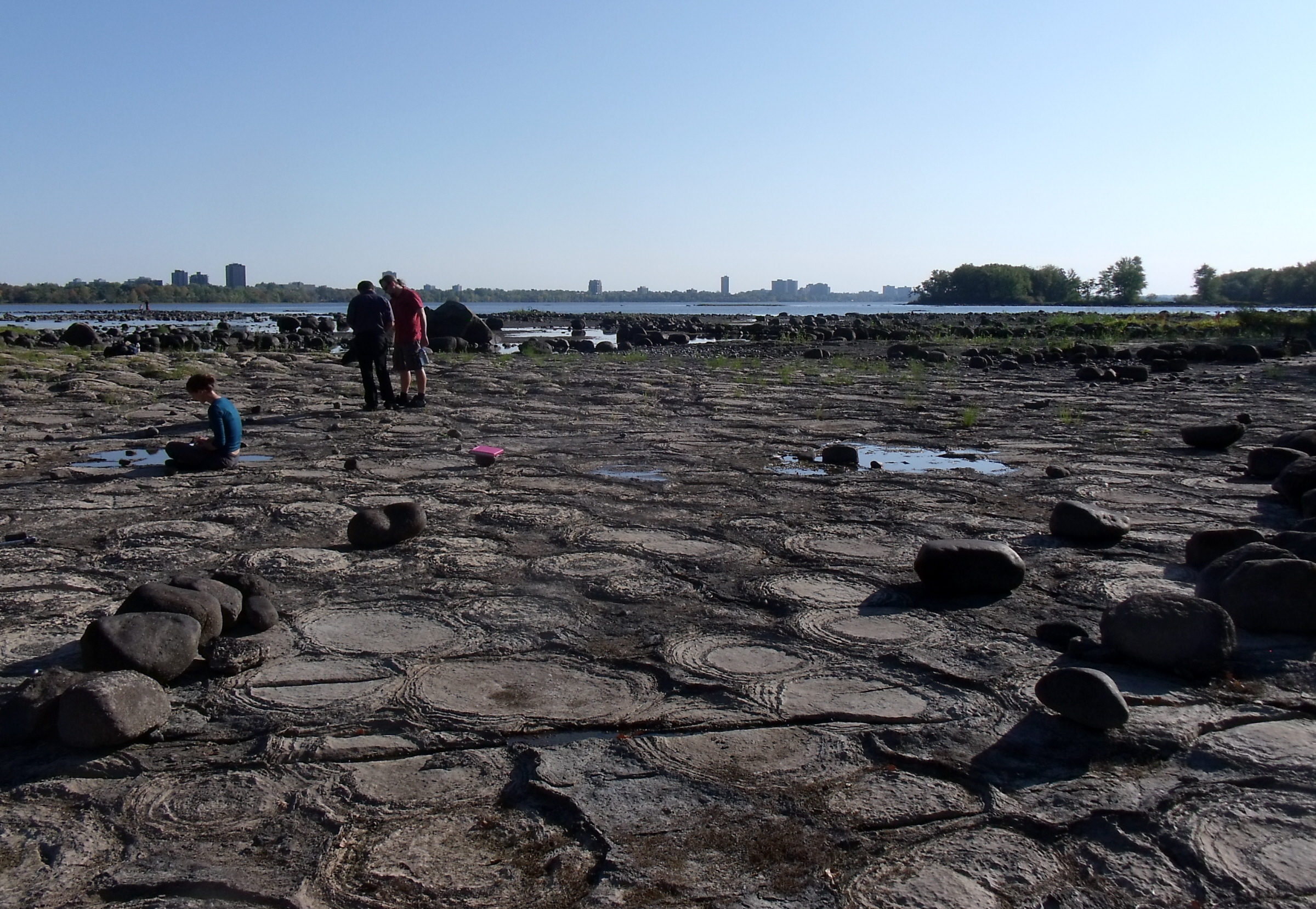
Stromatolite strata near Champlain Bridge

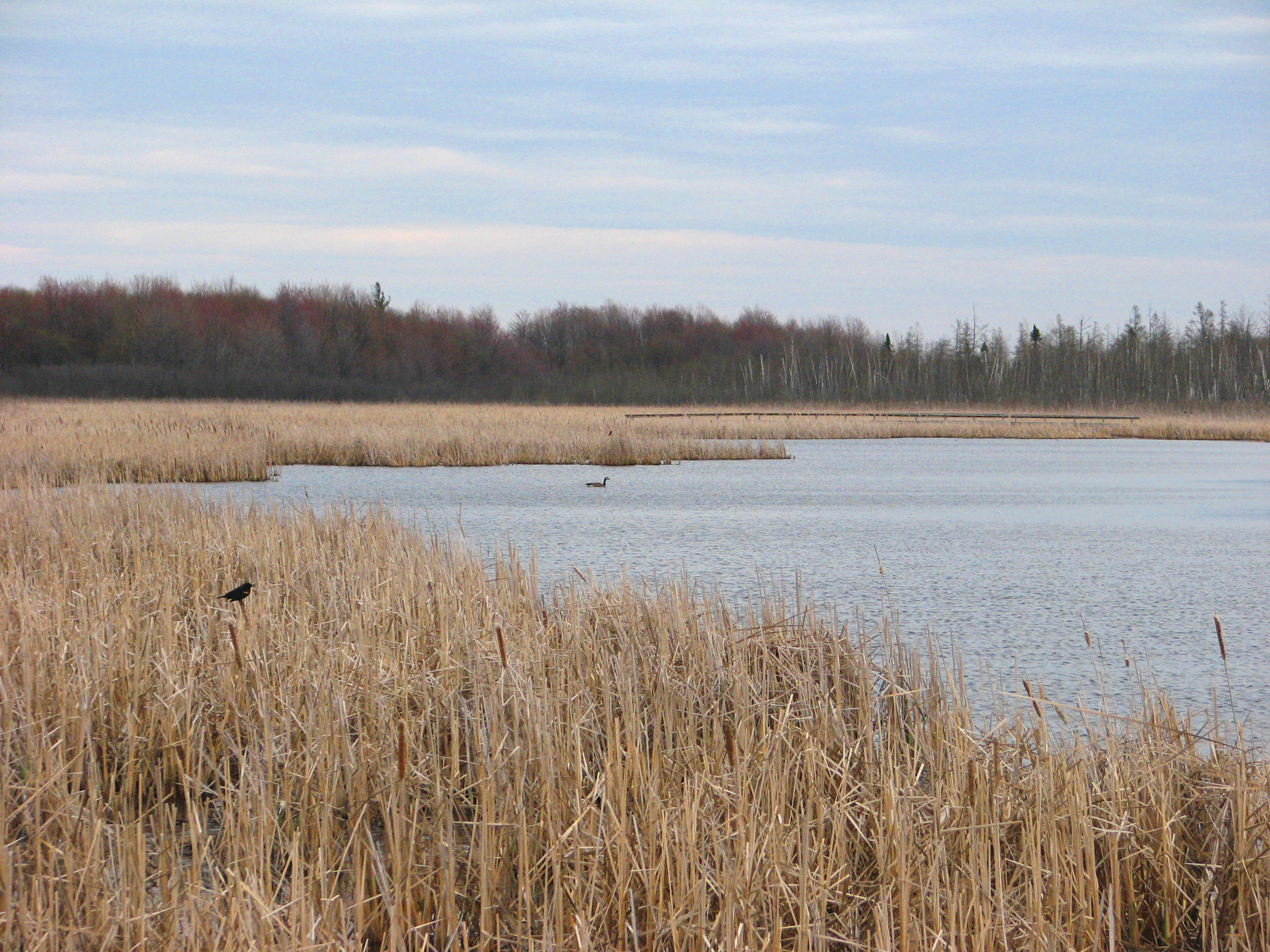
Mer Bleue bog

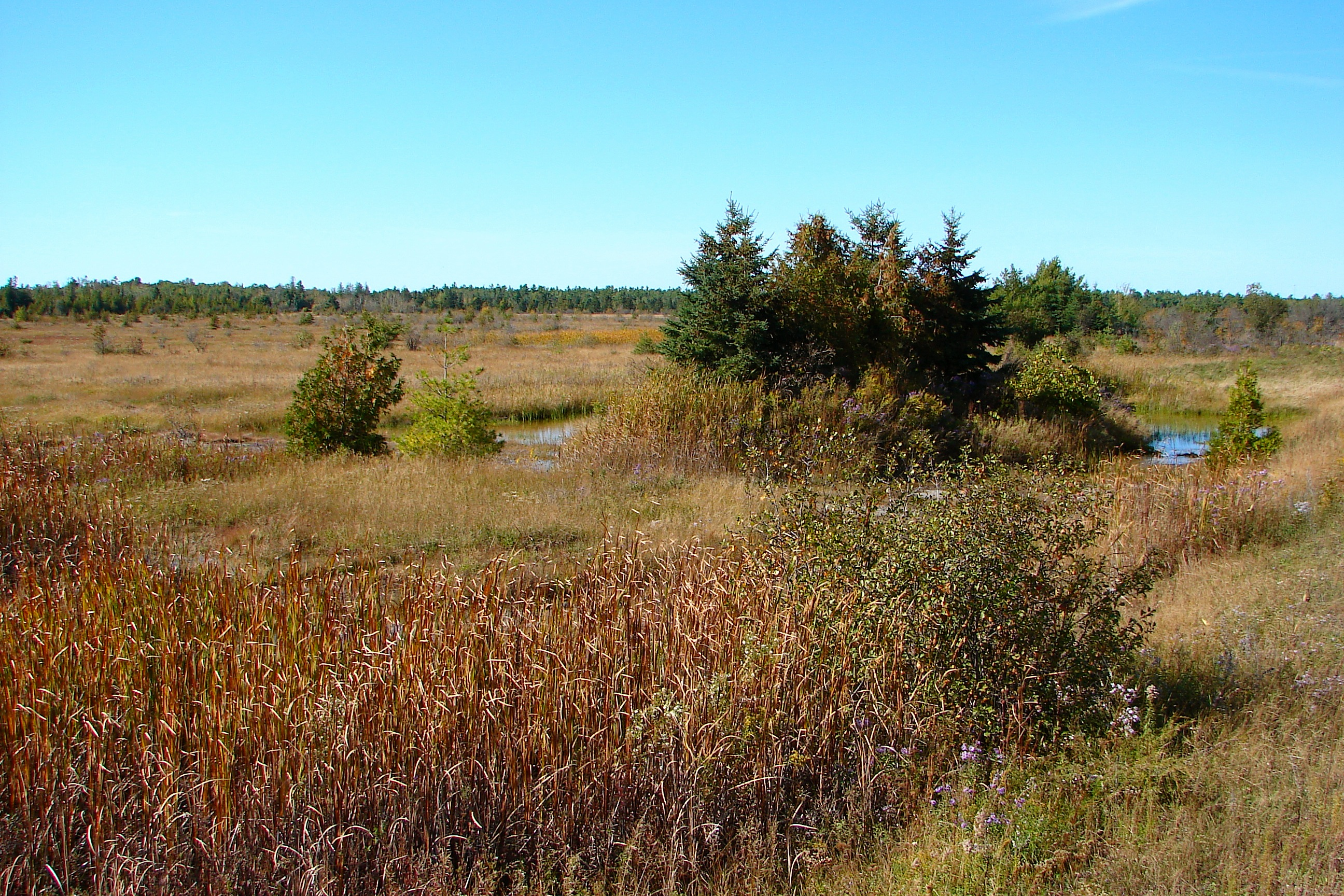
Burnt Lands Alvar

Many features of geologic interest are found in Ottawa.

Site	Feature
W. Erskine Johnston Public School	Glacially sculpted Precambrian gneiss outcrops
Kanata Centrum Shopping Centre	Sandstone and dolomite outcrops
Stony Swamp Conservation Area	Cambrian-Ordovician sandstone strata
Champlain Bridge	Stromatolite fossils
Westboro Beach	Stromatolite, orthocone and trace fossils
Transitway at Roosevelt Avenue	Stromatolite fossils
Tunney's Pasture	Cross-section of the Gloucester Fault
Geological Survey of Canada	Fossiliferous limestone outcrop
Hog's Back Falls	Ordovician sedimentary rocks and the Gloucester Fault
Mer Bleue Bog	Boreal peatland
Victoria Island	Dune bedforms and fossiliferous limestone
Lady Grey Drive	Ordovician limestone deposits
Pinhey's Point	Glacial erratics
Petrie Island	Sedimentary shoreline with imported Ordovician blocks
Carp Hills	Outcrops of the Canadian Shield
Pinhey Sand Dunes	Dunes from an ancient shoreline of the Champlain Sea
Cardinal Creek Karst	Paleozoic karst
Burnt Lands Alvar	Limestone alvar
Colonel By Valley	Shallow valley that descends into the Ottawa River
Nanny Goat Hill	Steep limestone escarpment

== Climate ==
=== Classification ===
Ottawa Climate according to major climate systems
Climatic scheme	Initials	Description
Köppen system	Dfb	Warm-summer humid continental climate
Trewartha system	Dcb	Continental climate

=== Recent data ===
==== Central Experimental Farm ====
Ottawa Central Experimental Farm

Climate chart (precipitation, max. and min. temperature)
J	F	M	A	M	J	J	A	S	O	N	D
65 −5 −14	52 −3 −13	62 3 −7	81 11 1	80 19 8	95 24 13	92 27 16	87 26 15	87 21 10	90 13 4	72 6 −2	74 −2 −9
- █ Average max. and min. temperatures in °C
- █ Precipitation totals in mm
- Source: Environment Canada
Imperial conversion
J	F	M	A	M	J	J	A	S	O	N	D
2.6 23 7	2.1 26 9	2.4 37 20	3.2 52 34	3.2 67 46	3.7 76 56	3.6 80 60	3.4 78 58	3.4 70 50	3.6 56 39	2.8 42 29	2.9 29 16
- █ Average max. and min. temperatures in °F
- █ Precipitation totals in inches

Ottawa Central Experimental Farm maximum records:

- Record high temperature of 37.8 °C (100.0 °F) recorded on August 14, 1944
- Record high daily minimum of 24.8 °C (76.6 °F) recorded on August 9, 2001
- Record high dew point of 28.1 °C (82.6 °F) recorded on August 6, 2001
- Most humid month with an average monthly dew point of 18.8 °C (65.8 °F) recorded during July 2006
- Warmest month with an average monthly mean temperature of 24.9 °C (76.8 °F) recorded during July 1921
  - Warmest monthly average daily maximum of 31.4 °C (88.5 °F) recorded during July 1921
  - Warmest monthly average daily minimum of 18.5 °C (65.3 °F) recorded during July 1921
  - July 2020 saw no daily maximum temperature below 26.0 °C (78.8 °F)
  - July 2020 saw no temperature below 14.0 °C (57.2 °F)
  - August 2015 saw no dew point below 8.9 °C (48.0 °F)

The lowest yearly maximum dew point is 22.0 °C (71.6 °F) recorded in 2014. The lowest yearly maximum daily minimum temperature is 18.9 °C (66.0 °F) recorded in 1886. The lowest yearly maximum temperature is 29.4 °C (84.9 °F) recorded in 1883, the only year where summer did not exceed 30.0 °C (86.0 °F) in Ottawa.

The average yearly maximum dew point is 24.0 °C (75.2 °F) and the average yearly maximum daily minimum temperature is 22.5 °C (72.5 °F).

Climate data for Ottawa (Central Experimental Farm), 1991–2020 normals, extremes 1872–present (Note: Extreme high and low temperatures in the table below were recorded at Ottawa from March 1872 to October 1889 and at Ottawa CDA from November 1889 to present.)
Month	Jan	Feb	Mar	Apr	May	Jun	Jul	Aug	Sep	Oct	Nov	Dec	Year
Record high humidex	12.9	12.0	28.4	35.3	39.7	44.1	45.7	49.9	41.6	36.1	24.3	18.3	49.9
Record high °C (°F)	15.6 (60.1)	16.0 (60.8)	26.7 (80.1)	31.2 (88.2)	35.2 (95.4)	36.7 (98.1)	37.8 (100.0)	37.8 (100.0)	36.7 (98.1)	31.0 (87.8)	24.0 (75.2)	17.2 (63.0)	37.8 (100.0)
Mean maximum °C (°F)	6.8 (44.2)	6.8 (44.2)	13.6 (56.5)	24.1 (75.4)	29.8 (85.6)	32.1 (89.8)	32.4 (90.3)	32.1 (89.8)	29.7 (85.5)	23.9 (75.0)	17.0 (62.6)	9.3 (48.7)	33.7 (92.7)
Mean daily maximum °C (°F)	−5.2 (22.6)	−3.3 (26.1)	2.5 (36.5)	11.2 (52.2)	19.4 (66.9)	24.2 (75.6)	26.7 (80.1)	25.6 (78.1)	21.1 (70.0)	13.3 (55.9)	5.8 (42.4)	−1.5 (29.3)	11.7 (53.1)
Daily mean °C (°F)	−9.6 (14.7)	−8.1 (17.4)	−2.2 (28.0)	6.2 (43.2)	13.8 (56.8)	18.8 (65.8)	21.3 (70.3)	20.1 (68.2)	15.6 (60.1)	8.8 (47.8)	2.0 (35.6)	−5.1 (22.8)	6.8 (44.2)
Mean daily minimum °C (°F)	−14.0 (6.8)	−12.9 (8.8)	−6.9 (19.6)	1.1 (34.0)	8.0 (46.4)	13.3 (55.9)	15.8 (60.4)	14.6 (58.3)	10.1 (50.2)	4.1 (39.4)	−1.8 (28.8)	−8.7 (16.3)	1.9 (35.4)
Mean minimum °C (°F)	−26.7 (−16.1)	−24.1 (−11.4)	−19.6 (−3.3)	−7.0 (19.4)	0.8 (33.4)	6.3 (43.3)	10.1 (50.2)	8.0 (46.4)	1.9 (35.4)	−3.5 (25.7)	−11.2 (11.8)	−21.7 (−7.1)	−27.8 (−18.0)
Record low °C (°F)	−37.8 (−36.0)	−38.3 (−36.9)	−36.7 (−34.1)	−20.6 (−5.1)	−7.2 (19.0)	0.0 (32.0)	3.3 (37.9)	1.1 (34.0)	−4.4 (24.1)	−12.8 (9.0)	−30.6 (−23.1)	−38.9 (−38.0)	−38.9 (−38.0)
Record low wind chill	−40.6	−42.8	−40.1	−20.8	−8.1	0.0	0.0	0.0	−1.0	−9.6	−25.6	−41.3	−42.8
Average precipitation mm (inches)	65.2 (2.57)	52.4 (2.06)	61.6 (2.43)	81.3 (3.20)	80.1 (3.15)	95.1 (3.74)	92.3 (3.63)	87.4 (3.44)	87.0 (3.43)	90.2 (3.55)	72.0 (2.83)	73.6 (2.90)	938.1 (36.93)
Average rainfall mm (inches)	27.0 (1.06)	17.0 (0.67)	32.5 (1.28)	72.2 (2.84)	80.0 (3.15)	95.1 (3.74)	92.3 (3.63)	87.4 (3.44)	87.0 (3.43)	88.6 (3.49)	57.1 (2.25)	35.3 (1.39)	771.5 (30.37)
Average snowfall cm (inches)	44.5 (17.5)	41.0 (16.1)	30.9 (12.2)	7.5 (3.0)	0.0 (0.0)	0.0 (0.0)	0.0 (0.0)	0.0 (0.0)	0.0 (0.0)	1.7 (0.7)	16.1 (6.3)	42.7 (16.8)	184.5 (72.6)
Average extreme snow depth cm (inches)	17 (6.7)	25 (9.8)	20 (7.9)	2 (0.8)	0 (0)	0 (0)	0 (0)	0 (0)	0 (0)	0 (0)	1 (0.4)	8 (3.1)	6 (2.4)
Average precipitation days (≥ 0.2 mm)	15.2	12.0	11.3	12.5	13.5	12.9	12.2	11.5	11.9	14.5	13.9	15.6	157.0
Average rainy days (≥ 0.2 mm)	4.5	3.1	5.6	11.1	13.5	12.9	12.2	11.5	11.9	14.3	10.5	6.3	117.4
Average snowy days (≥ 0.2 cm)	13.0	10.1	7.1	2.3	0.07	0.0	0.0	0.0	0.0	0.38	4.6	11.4	48.9
Average relative humidity (%) (at 15:00 LST)	70.6	63.5	57.6	51.2	51.0	55.1	54.3	55.7	58.1	63.9	68.1	75.5	60.4
Average dew point °C (°F)	−12.2 (10.0)	−11.8 (10.8)	−7.5 (18.5)	−1.1 (30.0)	6.4 (43.5)	12.5 (54.5)	15.4 (59.7)	14.8 (58.6)	11.4 (52.5)	4.7 (40.5)	−1.4 (29.5)	−7.8 (18.0)	2.0 (35.6)
Mean monthly sunshine hours	99.3	131.3	167.1	189.8	229.8	254.2	279.0	249.3	177.6	139.4	84.3	82.6	2,083.7
Percentage possible sunshine	35.0	44.9	45.3	46.9	49.9	54.3	58.9	57.1	47.1	41.0	29.4	30.3	45.0
Source: Environment and Climate Change Canada (sun 1981–2010)(dewpoint normals 2000-2020, dewpoint records 2000-present)

==== Ottawa International Airport ====
Ottawa International Airport

Climate chart (precipitation, max. and min. temperature)
J	F	M	A	M	J	J	A	S	O	N	D
70 −6 −14	50 −4 −13	66 2 −7	81 11 1	75 20 8	97 24 13	89 27 15	79 26 14	90 21 10	87 13 3	74 6 −2	72 −2 −10
- █ Average max. and min. temperatures in °C
- █ Precipitation totals in mm
- Source: Environment Canada
Imperial conversion
J	F	M	A	M	J	J	A	S	O	N	D
2.8 22 6	1.9 26 8	2.6 36 19	3.2 52 33	2.9 67 46	3.8 76 55	3.5 81 60	3.1 78 58	3.5 70 49	3.4 55 38	2.9 42 28	2.9 29 15
- █ Average max. and min. temperatures in °F
- █ Precipitation totals in inches

Ottawa Airport maximum records:

- Record high temperature of 37.8 °C (100.0 °F) recorded on August 14, 1944
- Record high daily minimum of 25.0 °C (77.0 °F) recorded on July 9, 1955
- Record high dew point of 27.0 °C (80.6 °F) recorded on June 24, 2025
- Most humid month with an average monthly dew point of 17.6 °C (63.7 °F) recorded during July 2024
- Warmest month with an average monthly mean temperature of 23.8 °C (74.8 °F) recorded during July 2020
  - Warmest monthly average daily maximum of 30.5 °C (86.9 °F) recorded during July 2020
  - Warmest monthly average daily minimum of 17.4 °C (63.3 °F) recorded during July 2020
  - July 2020 saw no daily maximum temperature below 26.4 °C (79.5 °F)
  - July 2020 saw no temperature below 13.7 °C (56.7 °F)
  - August 2015 saw no dew point below 9.1 °C (48.4 °F)

The lowest yearly maximum dew point is 20.6 °C (69.1 °F) recorded in 1976; the lowest yearly maximum daily minimum temperature is 18.9 °C (66.0 °F) recorded in 1976; and the lowest yearly maximum temperature is 30.2 °C (86.4 °F) recorded in 2000.

The average yearly maximum dew point is 23.7 °C (74.7 °F) and the average yearly maximum daily minimum temperature is 21.5 °C (70.7 °F).

Climate data for Ottawa International Airport, 1991–2020 normals, extremes 1938–present
Month	Jan	Feb	Mar	Apr	May	Jun	Jul	Aug	Sep	Oct	Nov	Dec	Year
Record high humidex	13.9	15.1	30.0	35.1	41.8	46.5	47.2	47.0	42.5	33.9	26.1	18.4	47.2
Record high °C (°F)	12.9 (55.2)	15.7 (60.3)	27.4 (81.3)	31.1 (88.0)	35.8 (96.4)	36.1 (97.0)	36.9 (98.4)	37.8 (100.0)	35.1 (95.2)	30.9 (87.6)	23.9 (75.0)	17.9 (64.2)	37.8 (100.0)
Mean maximum °C (°F)	6.8 (44.2)	6.5 (43.7)	13.8 (56.8)	24.0 (75.2)	30.1 (86.2)	32.3 (90.1)	32.6 (90.7)	32.2 (90.0)	29.7 (85.5)	23.8 (74.8)	16.9 (62.4)	9.3 (48.7)	34.0 (93.2)
Mean daily maximum °C (°F)	−5.5 (22.1)	−3.6 (25.5)	2.4 (36.3)	11.3 (52.3)	19.6 (67.3)	24.4 (75.9)	27.0 (80.6)	25.8 (78.4)	21.0 (69.8)	13.0 (55.4)	5.8 (42.4)	−1.9 (28.6)	11.6 (52.9)
Daily mean °C (°F)	−10.0 (14.0)	−8.5 (16.7)	−2.4 (27.7)	5.9 (42.6)	13.6 (56.5)	18.7 (65.7)	21.2 (70.2)	20.1 (68.2)	15.3 (59.5)	8.2 (46.8)	1.7 (35.1)	−5.8 (21.6)	6.5 (43.7)
Mean daily minimum °C (°F)	−14.3 (6.3)	−13.2 (8.2)	−7.1 (19.2)	0.5 (32.9)	7.5 (45.5)	12.9 (55.2)	15.4 (59.7)	14.3 (57.7)	9.6 (49.3)	3.4 (38.1)	−2.4 (27.7)	−9.6 (14.7)	1.4 (34.5)
Mean minimum °C (°F)	−26.8 (−16.2)	−23.6 (−10.5)	−19.1 (−2.4)	−6.9 (19.6)	0.1 (32.2)	5.7 (42.3)	10.3 (50.5)	8.7 (47.7)	2.1 (35.8)	−3.8 (25.2)	−11.7 (10.9)	−21.7 (−7.1)	−27.7 (−17.9)
Record low °C (°F)	−35.6 (−32.1)	−36.1 (−33.0)	−30.6 (−23.1)	−16.7 (1.9)	−5.6 (21.9)	−0.1 (31.8)	5.0 (41.0)	2.6 (36.7)	−3.0 (26.6)	−8.0 (17.6)	−21.7 (−7.1)	−34.4 (−29.9)	−36.1 (−33.0)
Record low wind chill	−47.8	−47.6	−42.7	−26.3	−10.9	0.0	0.0	0.0	−6.4	−13.3	−29.5	−44.6	−47.8
Average precipitation mm (inches)	70.4 (2.77)	49.5 (1.95)	66.3 (2.61)	81.3 (3.20)	74.8 (2.94)	96.8 (3.81)	88.5 (3.48)	79.0 (3.11)	89.6 (3.53)	87.4 (3.44)	73.9 (2.91)	72.4 (2.85)	929.8 (36.61)
Average rainfall mm (inches)	29.3 (1.15)	14.5 (0.57)	34.6 (1.36)	69.6 (2.74)	74.5 (2.93)	96.8 (3.81)	88.5 (3.48)	79.0 (3.11)	90.6 (3.57)	84.7 (3.33)	60.5 (2.38)	34.7 (1.37)	757.2 (29.81)
Average snowfall cm (inches)	59.2 (23.3)	48.5 (19.1)	38.8 (15.3)	12.2 (4.8)	0.2 (0.1)	0.0 (0.0)	0.0 (0.0)	0.0 (0.0)	0.0 (0.0)	2.7 (1.1)	20.7 (8.1)	49.6 (19.5)	231.9 (91.3)
Average precipitation days (≥ 0.2 mm)	16.7	13.0	12.6	12.1	13.4	13.9	12.1	11.2	12.4	14.1	14.4	16.7	162.7
Average rainy days (≥ 0.2 mm)	4.9	3.7	6.8	11.0	13.4	13.9	12.1	11.2	12.3	13.6	10.5	6.6	120.0
Average snowy days (≥ 0.2 cm)	16.4	12.9	8.6	3.2	0.13	0.0	0.0	0.0	0.0	0.87	6.5	13.9	62.3
Average relative humidity (%) (at 15:00)	68.4	62.0	57.0	49.5	49.5	53.5	54.2	55.3	58.4	61.6	66.9	72.3	59.1
Average dew point °C (°F)	−13.5 (7.7)	−12.7 (9.1)	−8.0 (17.6)	−1.9 (28.6)	5.9 (42.6)	12.1 (53.8)	14.9 (58.8)	14.4 (57.9)	10.7 (51.3)	4.0 (39.2)	−2.3 (27.9)	−8.6 (16.5)	1.3 (34.3)
Mean monthly sunshine hours	122.4	114.1	168.5	187.5	210.5	274.0	301.4	231.9	211.5	148.8	92.4	68.8	2,131.7
Percentage possible sunshine	43.1	39.0	45.7	46.3	45.7	58.6	63.7	53.1	56.1	43.7	32.2	25.2	46.0
Source 1: Environment Canada (sunshine 1981–2010)
Source 2: weatherstats.ca (for dewpoint and monthly/yearly average absolute maximum/minimum temperature)

=== Historical data ===
Climate data for Ottawa (Central Experimental Farm), elevation: 79.2 m (260 ft), 1981–2010 normals
Month	Jan	Feb	Mar	Apr	May	Jun	Jul	Aug	Sep	Oct	Nov	Dec	Year
Mean daily maximum °C (°F)	−5.8 (21.6)	−3.1 (26.4)	2.4 (36.3)	11.4 (52.5)	19.0 (66.2)	24.1 (75.4)	26.6 (79.9)	25.4 (77.7)	20.5 (68.9)	12.8 (55.0)	5.5 (41.9)	−2.0 (28.4)	11.4 (52.5)
Daily mean °C (°F)	−10.2 (13.6)	−7.9 (17.8)	−2.2 (28.0)	6.5 (43.7)	13.5 (56.3)	18.7 (65.7)	21.2 (70.2)	19.9 (67.8)	15.3 (59.5)	8.4 (47.1)	2.0 (35.6)	−5.6 (21.9)	6.6 (43.9)
Mean daily minimum °C (°F)	−14.4 (6.1)	−12.5 (9.5)	−6.8 (19.8)	1.5 (34.7)	8.0 (46.4)	13.3 (55.9)	15.7 (60.3)	14.5 (58.1)	10.1 (50.2)	4.0 (39.2)	−1.5 (29.3)	−9.2 (15.4)	1.9 (35.4)
Average precipitation mm (inches)	62.9 (2.48)	49.7 (1.96)	57.5 (2.26)	71.1 (2.80)	86.6 (3.41)	92.7 (3.65)	84.4 (3.32)	83.8 (3.30)	92.7 (3.65)	85.9 (3.38)	82.7 (3.26)	69.5 (2.74)	919.5 (36.20)
Average rainfall mm (inches)	23.0 (0.91)	17.9 (0.70)	28.8 (1.13)	63.2 (2.49)	86.6 (3.41)	92.7 (3.65)	84.4 (3.32)	83.8 (3.30)	92.7 (3.65)	83.1 (3.27)	67.5 (2.66)	31.9 (1.26)	755.5 (29.74)
Average snowfall cm (inches)	44.3 (17.4)	34.7 (13.7)	29.1 (11.5)	7.2 (2.8)	0.0 (0.0)	0.0 (0.0)	0.0 (0.0)	0.0 (0.0)	0.0 (0.0)	2.9 (1.1)	16.0 (6.3)	41.3 (16.3)	175.4 (69.1)
Average precipitation days (≥ 0.2 mm)	16.0	11.7	11.5	13.2	14.5	12.4	11.6	11.2	12.9	14.9	15.2	15.6	160.7
Average rainy days (≥ 0.2 mm)	3.7	3.5	5.5	11.5	14.4	12.4	11.6	11.2	12.9	14.6	11.6	5.5	118.3
Average snowy days (≥ 0.2 cm)	14.1	9.7	7.4	2.7	0.08	0.0	0.0	0.0	0.0	0.81	5.1	12.2	52.0
Mean monthly sunshine hours	99.3	131.3	167.1	189.8	229.8	254.2	279.0	249.3	177.6	139.4	84.3	82.6	2,083.7
Percentage possible sunshine	35.0	44.9	45.3	46.9	49.9	54.3	58.9	57.1	47.1	41.0	29.4	30.3	45.0
Source: Environment Canada and Weather Atlas

Climate data for Ottawa (Central Experimental Farm), elevation: 79 m (259 ft), 1961-1990 normals
Month	Jan	Feb	Mar	Apr	May	Jun	Jul	Aug	Sep	Oct	Nov	Dec	Year
Mean daily maximum °C (°F)	−6.4 (20.5)	−4.5 (23.9)	1.8 (35.2)	10.8 (51.4)	18.6 (65.5)	23.6 (74.5)	26.4 (79.5)	24.7 (76.5)	19.7 (67.5)	12.8 (55.0)	4.8 (40.6)	−3.6 (25.5)	10.7 (51.3)
Daily mean °C (°F)	−10.7 (12.7)	−9.2 (15.4)	−2.6 (27.3)	5.9 (42.6)	13.0 (55.4)	18.1 (64.6)	20.8 (69.4)	19.4 (66.9)	14.7 (58.5)	8.3 (46.9)	1.5 (34.7)	−7.2 (19.0)	6.0 (42.8)
Mean daily minimum °C (°F)	−15.1 (4.8)	−14.0 (6.8)	−7.1 (19.2)	0.9 (33.6)	7.3 (45.1)	12.5 (54.5)	15.3 (59.5)	14.1 (57.4)	9.6 (49.3)	3.8 (38.8)	−1.9 (28.6)	−11.0 (12.2)	1.2 (34.2)
Average precipitation mm (inches)	50.8 (2.00)	49.7 (1.96)	56.6 (2.23)	64.8 (2.55)	76.8 (3.02)	84.3 (3.32)	86.5 (3.41)	87.8 (3.46)	83.6 (3.29)	74.7 (2.94)	81.0 (3.19)	72.9 (2.87)	869.5 (34.24)
Average rainfall mm (inches)	14.1 (0.56)	14.7 (0.58)	30.0 (1.18)	57.8 (2.28)	76.2 (3.00)	84.3 (3.32)	86.5 (3.41)	87.8 (3.46)	83.6 (3.29)	71.8 (2.83)	64.1 (2.52)	29.5 (1.16)	700.4 (27.59)
Average snowfall cm (inches)	46.1 (18.1)	41.0 (16.1)	27.2 (10.7)	6.7 (2.6)	0.6 (0.2)	0.0 (0.0)	0.0 (0.0)	0.0 (0.0)	0.0 (0.0)	2.9 (1.1)	19.1 (7.5)	53.9 (21.2)	197.5 (77.5)
Average precipitation days (≥ 0.2 mm)	15	12	12	12	13	13	12	12	13	13	15	16	158
Average rainy days (≥ 0.2 mm)	3	3	6	11	13	13	12	12	13	13	11	5	115
Average snowy days (≥ 0.2 cm)	14	11	7	2	trace	0	0	0	0	trace	5	14	53
Mean monthly sunshine hours	103.4	129.2	158.7	188.1	232.5	253.0	279.0	240.5	170.0	137.9	81.9	80.1	2,054.3
Source: Environment Canada

Climate data for Ottawa (Ottawa International Airport), elevation: 114 m (374 ft), 1981–2010 normals
Month	Jan	Feb	Mar	Apr	May	Jun	Jul	Aug	Sep	Oct	Nov	Dec	Year
Mean daily maximum °C (°F)	−5.8 (21.6)	−3.4 (25.9)	2.5 (36.5)	11.6 (52.9)	19.0 (66.2)	24.1 (75.4)	26.5 (79.7)	25.3 (77.5)	20.4 (68.7)	12.7 (54.9)	5.4 (41.7)	−2.3 (27.9)	11.3 (52.3)
Daily mean °C (°F)	−10.3 (13.5)	−8.1 (17.4)	−2.3 (27.9)	6.3 (43.3)	13.3 (55.9)	18.5 (65.3)	21.0 (69.8)	19.8 (67.6)	15.0 (59.0)	8.0 (46.4)	1.5 (34.7)	−6.2 (20.8)	6.4 (43.5)
Mean daily minimum °C (°F)	−14.8 (5.4)	−12.7 (9.1)	−7.0 (19.4)	1.0 (33.8)	7.5 (45.5)	12.9 (55.2)	15.5 (59.9)	14.3 (57.7)	9.6 (49.3)	3.3 (37.9)	−2.4 (27.7)	−10.1 (13.8)	1.4 (34.5)
Average precipitation mm (inches)	65.4 (2.57)	54.3 (2.14)	64.4 (2.54)	74.5 (2.93)	80.3 (3.16)	92.8 (3.65)	91.9 (3.62)	85.5 (3.37)	90.1 (3.55)	86.1 (3.39)	81.9 (3.22)	76.4 (3.01)	943.4 (37.14)
Average rainfall mm (inches)	25.0 (0.98)	18.7 (0.74)	31.1 (1.22)	63.0 (2.48)	80.1 (3.15)	92.8 (3.65)	91.9 (3.62)	85.5 (3.37)	90.1 (3.55)	82.2 (3.24)	64.5 (2.54)	33.5 (1.32)	758.2 (29.85)
Average snowfall cm (inches)	53.9 (21.2)	43.3 (17.0)	38.3 (15.1)	11.3 (4.4)	0.2 (0.1)	0.0 (0.0)	0.0 (0.0)	0.0 (0.0)	0.0 (0.0)	3.7 (1.5)	20.2 (8.0)	52.5 (20.7)	223.5 (88.0)
Average precipitation days (≥ 0.2 mm)	16.6	13.1	12.7	12.4	13.4	13.2	11.9	11.0	12.3	14.3	15.2	17.4	163.6
Average rainy days (≥ 0.2 mm)	4.4	3.9	6.7	10.9	13.4	13.2	11.9	11.0	12.3	13.7	11.0	6.0	118.4
Average snowy days (≥ 0.2 cm)	16.1	12.1	8.8	3.5	0.17	0.0	0.0	0.0	0.0	1.1	6.8	14.7	63.3
Average relative humidity (%)	67.5	61.3	56.6	50.2	49.9	53.1	53.7	55.0	59.1	61.6	68.1	72.2	59.0
Mean monthly sunshine hours	122.4	114.1	168.5	187.5	210.5	274.0	301.4	231.9	211.5	148.8	92.4	68.8	2,131.7
Percentage possible sunshine	43.1	39.0	45.7	46.3	45.7	58.6	63.7	53.1	56.1	43.7	32.2	25.2	46.0
Source: Environment Canada

Climate data for Ottawa (Ottawa International Airport), elevation: 116 m (381 ft), 1938-1990 normals
Month	Jan	Feb	Mar	Apr	May	Jun	Jul	Aug	Sep	Oct	Nov	Dec	Year
Mean daily maximum °C (°F)	−6.3 (20.7)	−4.6 (23.7)	1.8 (35.2)	10.8 (51.4)	18.6 (65.5)	23.6 (74.5)	26.4 (79.5)	24.6 (76.3)	19.6 (67.3)	12.8 (55.0)	4.7 (40.5)	−3.7 (25.3)	10.7 (51.2)
Daily mean °C (°F)	−10.8 (12.6)	−9.2 (15.4)	−2.7 (27.1)	5.6 (42.1)	12.8 (55.0)	17.9 (64.2)	20.8 (69.4)	19.2 (66.6)	14.3 (57.7)	7.9 (46.2)	1.0 (33.8)	−7.6 (18.3)	5.8 (42.4)
Mean daily minimum °C (°F)	−15.5 (4.1)	−14.0 (6.8)	−7.3 (18.9)	0.3 (32.5)	7.1 (44.8)	12.2 (54.0)	15.1 (59.2)	13.7 (56.7)	8.9 (48.0)	3.0 (37.4)	−2.8 (27.0)	−11.7 (10.9)	0.8 (33.4)
Average precipitation mm (inches)	58.0 (2.28)	58.6 (2.31)	64.8 (2.55)	69.0 (2.72)	76.4 (3.01)	76.9 (3.03)	88.1 (3.47)	92.0 (3.62)	82.9 (3.26)	74.8 (2.94)	86.4 (3.40)	82.5 (3.25)	910.4 (35.84)
Average rainfall mm (inches)	15.3 (0.60)	16.4 (0.65)	32.0 (1.26)	58.0 (2.28)	74.8 (2.94)	76.9 (3.03)	88.1 (3.47)	92.0 (3.62)	82.9 (3.26)	70.3 (2.77)	62.5 (2.46)	32.6 (1.28)	701.8 (27.62)
Average snowfall cm (inches)	49.6 (19.5)	45.2 (17.8)	32.3 (12.7)	9.1 (3.6)	1.2 (0.5)	0.0 (0.0)	0.0 (0.0)	0.0 (0.0)	0.0 (0.0)	4.1 (1.6)	24.2 (9.5)	55.8 (22.0)	221.5 (87.2)
Average precipitation days (≥ 0.2 mm)	16	13	13	12	13	12	11	11	12	13	16	18	160
Average rainy days (≥ 0.2 mm)	3	3	7	10	12	12	11	11	12	12	11	6	110
Average snowy days (≥ 0.2 cm)	15	12	9	3	trace	0	0	0	0	1	8	16	64
Average relative humidity (%)	71	68	66	61	61	66	67	71	74	73	77	77	69
Source: Environment Canada

== Rivers and creeks ==
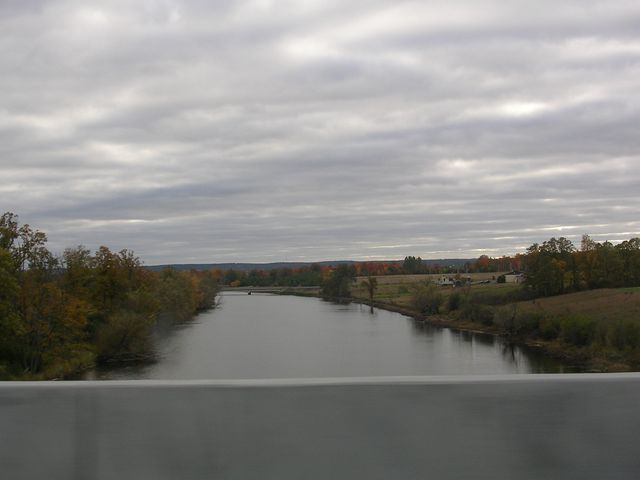
The Mississippi River.

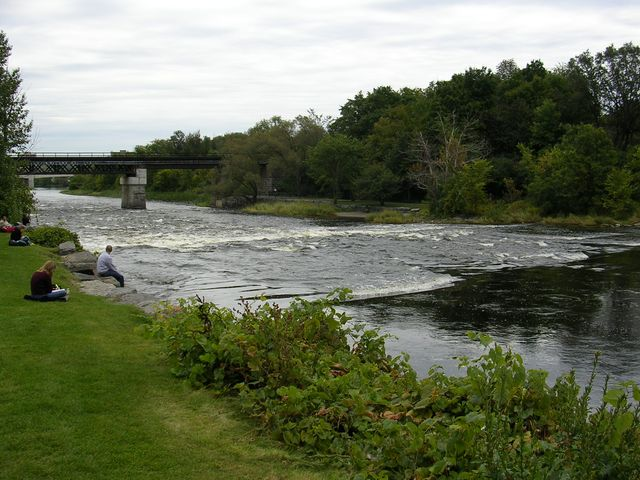
The Rideau River is one of the two main rivers in Ottawa

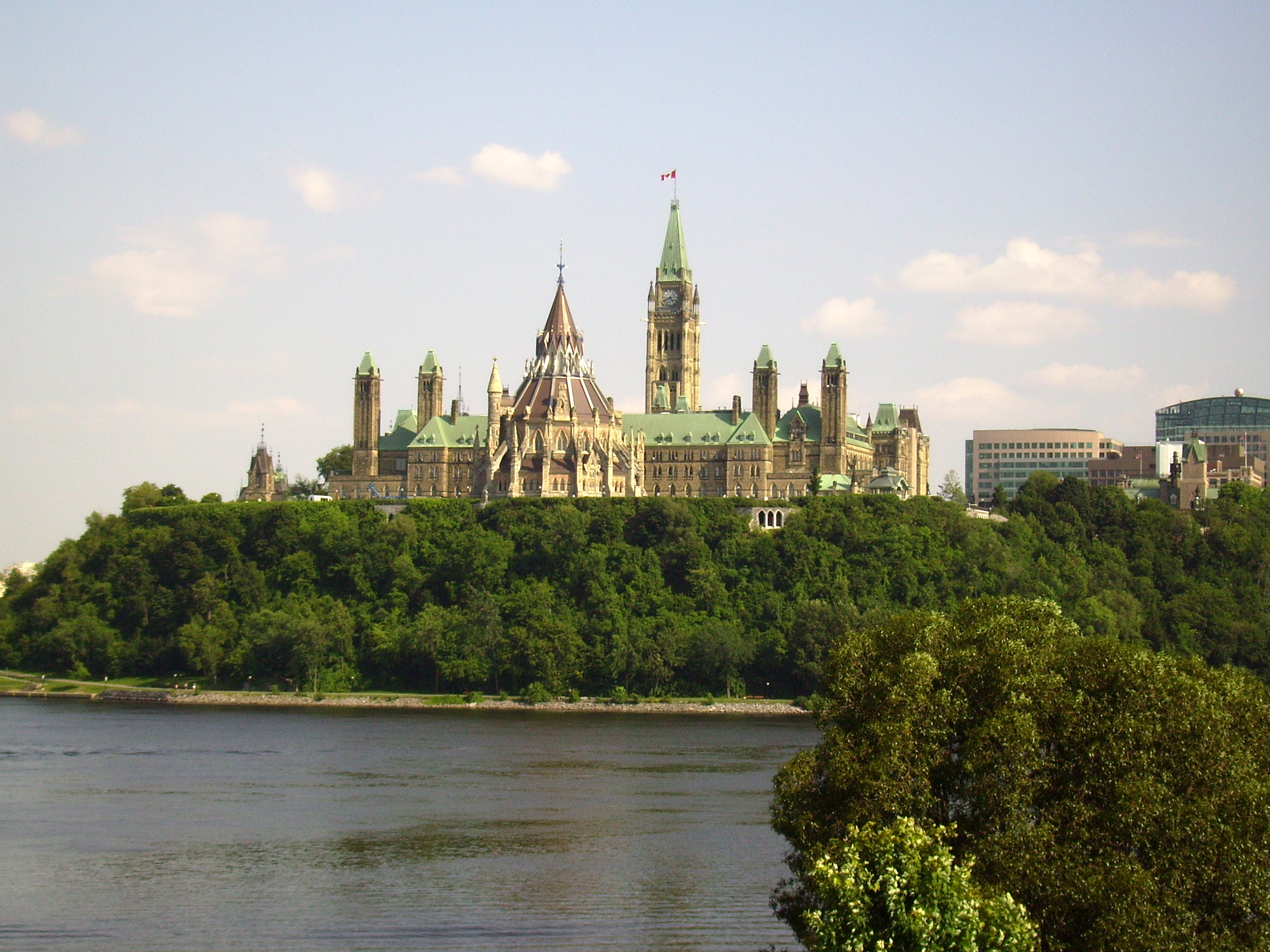
The Ottawa River outside of Parliament Hill.

Tributaries of the Ottawa River (from east to west):

- Becketts Creek
- Cardinal Creek
- Taylor Creek
- Bilberry Creek
- Green's Creek
  - Mud Creek
  - Borthwick Creek
    - Nicolet Drain
  - Ramsay Creek
  - McEwan Creek
- Rideau River
- Rideau Canal (artificial)
  - Brown's Inlet
  - Patterson Creek
- Graham Creek
- Still Water Creek
- Watts Creek
- Shirley's Brook
- Constance Creek
- Carp River
- Mississippi River
  - Cartwrights Creek
  - Cody Creek
- Madawaska River (mouth not in Ottawa)

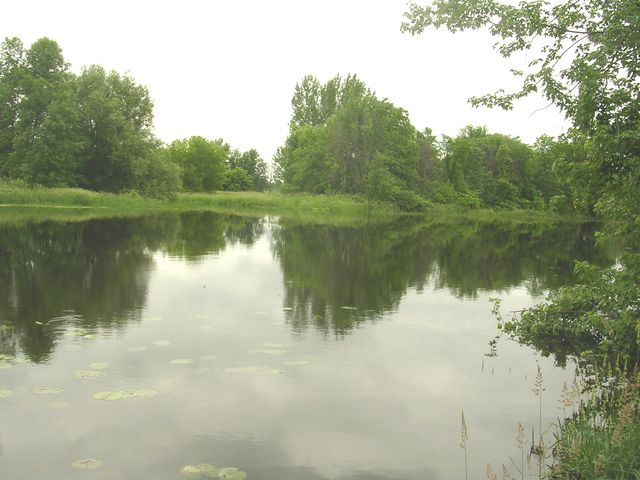
The Jock River

Tributaries of the Rideau River (from north to south):

- Sawmill Creek
- Nepean Creek
- Black Rapids Creek
- Mosquito Creek
- Jock River
  - Mahoney Creek
  - Nichols Creek
  - Kings Creek
- Mud Creek
- Stevens Creek
- Cranberry Creek
- McDermot Drain (mouth not in Ottawa)
- Brassills Creek
- Rideau Creek

Other rivers and creeks within City of Ottawa:

- Bear Brook
  - South Indian Creek
  - Shaws Creek
  - McKinnons Creek
- North Castor River
  - Black Creek
- Middle Castor River
- South Castor River

=== Features of the Ottawa River ===
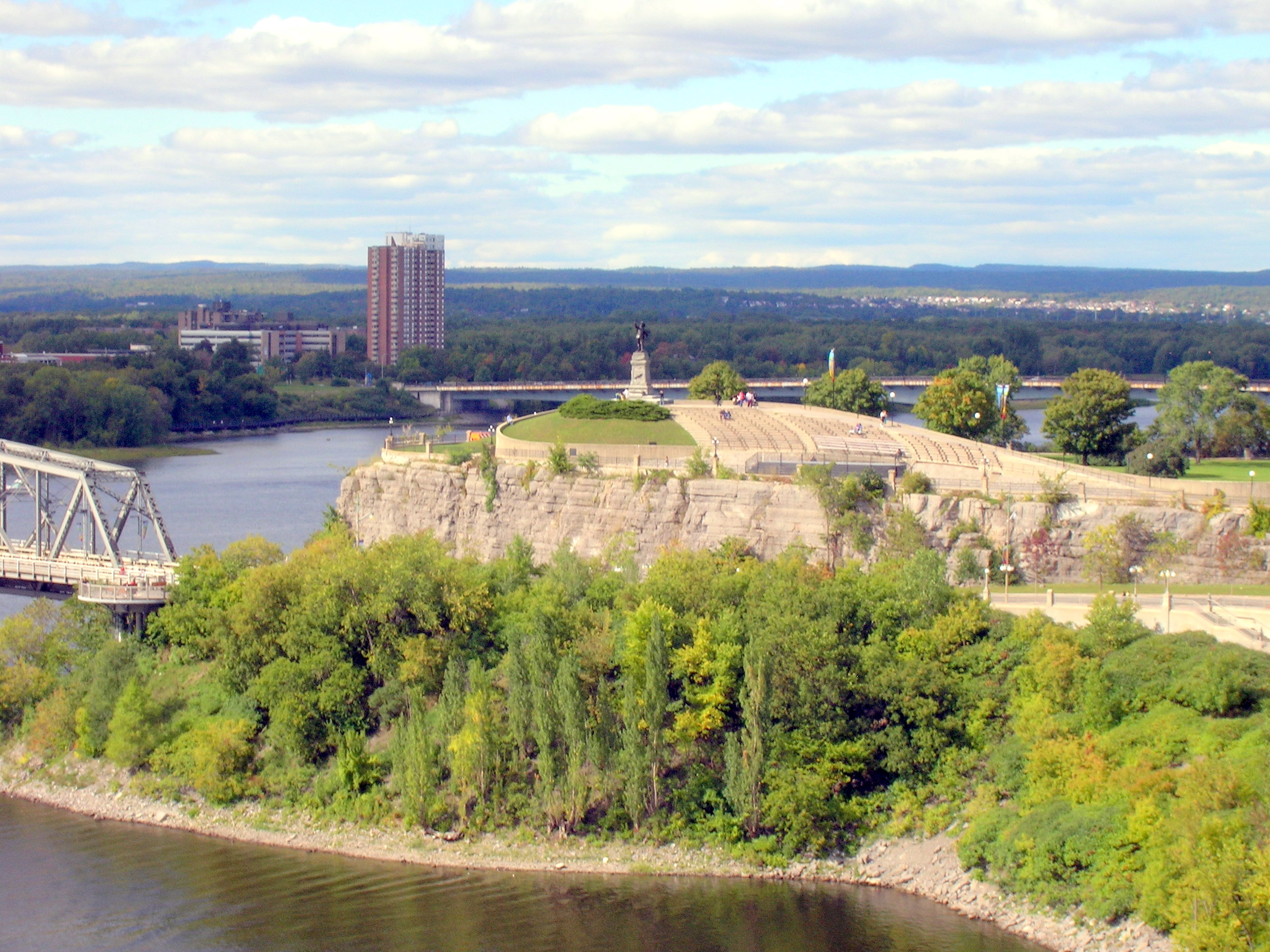
Kìwekì Point

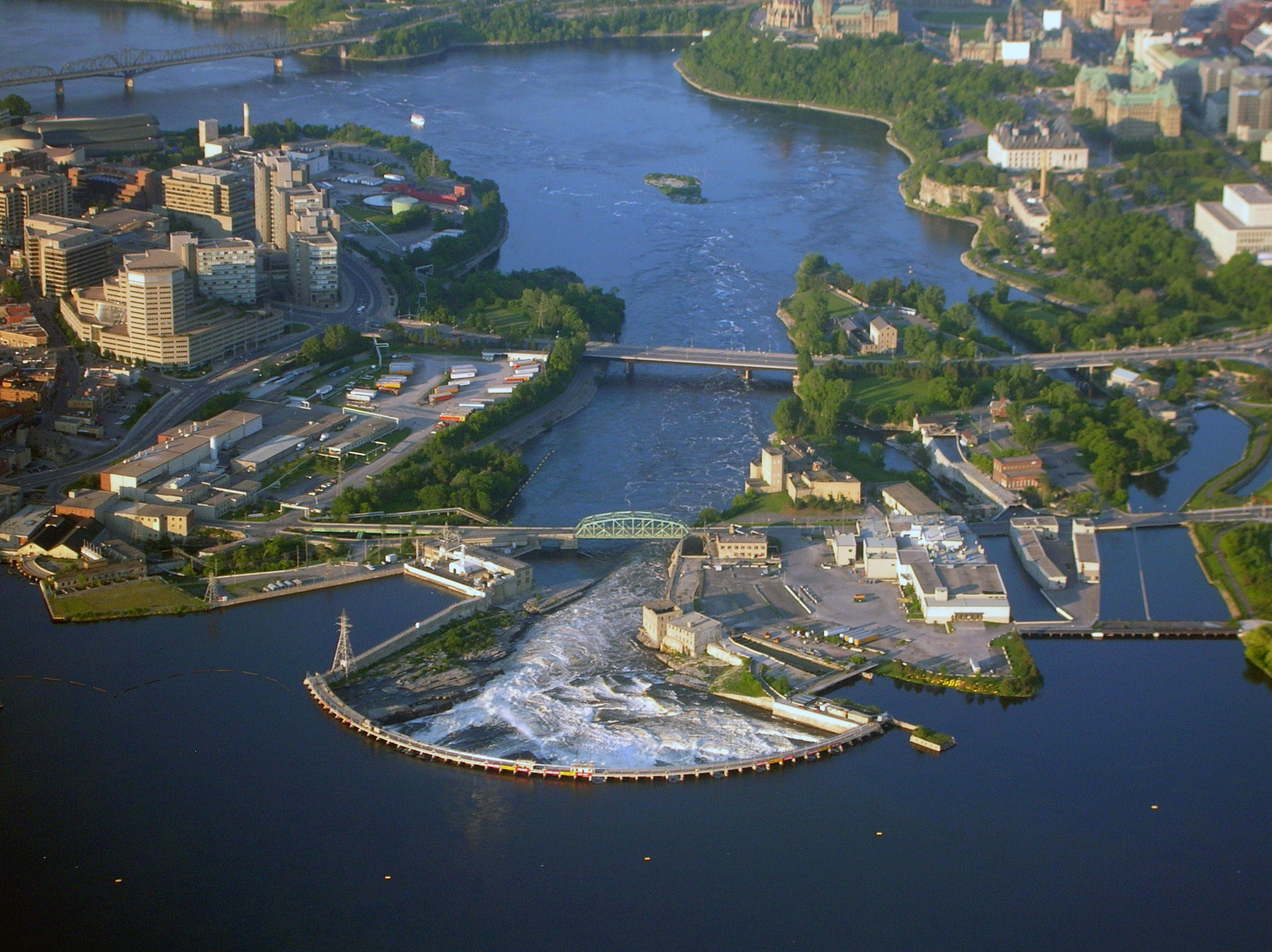
Chaudière Falls

(from east to west)

- Petrie Island
- Lower Duck Island
- Upper Duck Island
- Governor Bay
- Nepean Point
- Victoria Island
- Chaudière Island
- Chaudière Falls
- Nepean Bay
- Lemieux Island
- Bell Island
- Merrill Island
- Nicholas Island
- Lazy Bay
- Little Chaudière Rapids
- Remic Rapids
- Bate Island
- Cummingham Island
- Riopelle Island
- Deschênes Rapids
- Britannia Bay
- Graham Bay
- Rocky Point
- Crystal Bay
- Beatty Point
- Shirleys Bay
- Haycock Island
- Chartrand Island
- Innis Point
- Aylmer Island
- Pinhey Point
- Stony Point
- Horseshoe Bay
- Constance Bay
- Sand Point
- Buckham's Point
- Buckham's Bay
- Crown Point
- Woolsey Narrows
- Alexandra Island
- Kedey's Island
- Chats Falls
- Morris Island
- Lavergne Point
- Lavergne Bay
- Pickerel Bay
- Snake Island
- Indian Point
- Marshall Bay
- Pocket Bay
- Goodwin Bay

=== Features of the Rideau River ===
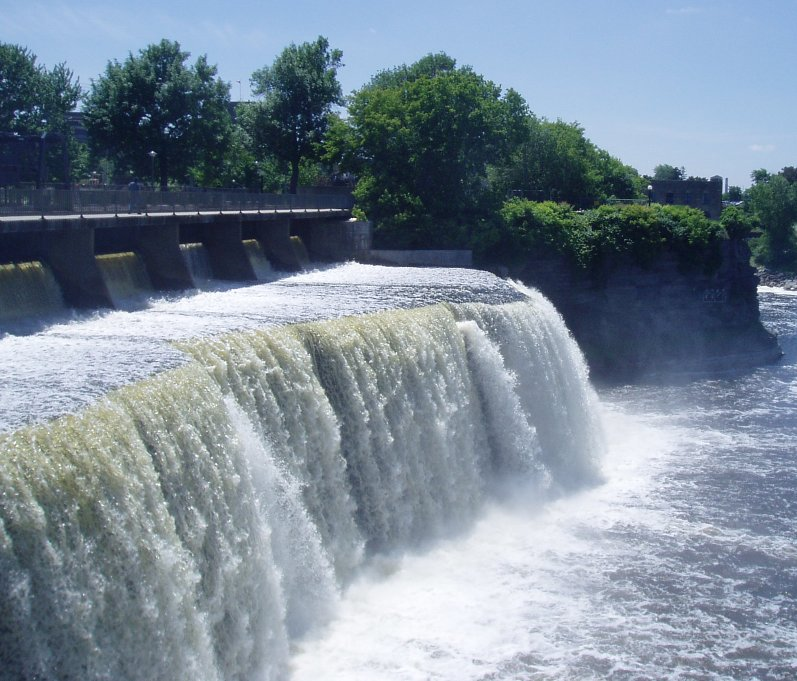
Rideau Falls

(from north to south)

- Rideau Falls
- Green Island
- Maple Island
- Porter Island
- Cummings Island
- Hog's Back Falls (Prince of Wales Falls)
- Mooney's Bay
- Black Rapids
- Nicholls Island
- Long Island
- Mahogany Harbour
- Collins Point
- Sanders Island
- James Island
- McGahey's Bend

=== Waterfalls ===
- Chaudière Falls
- Hog's Back Falls
- Princess Louise Falls
- Rideau Falls

== Lakes ==
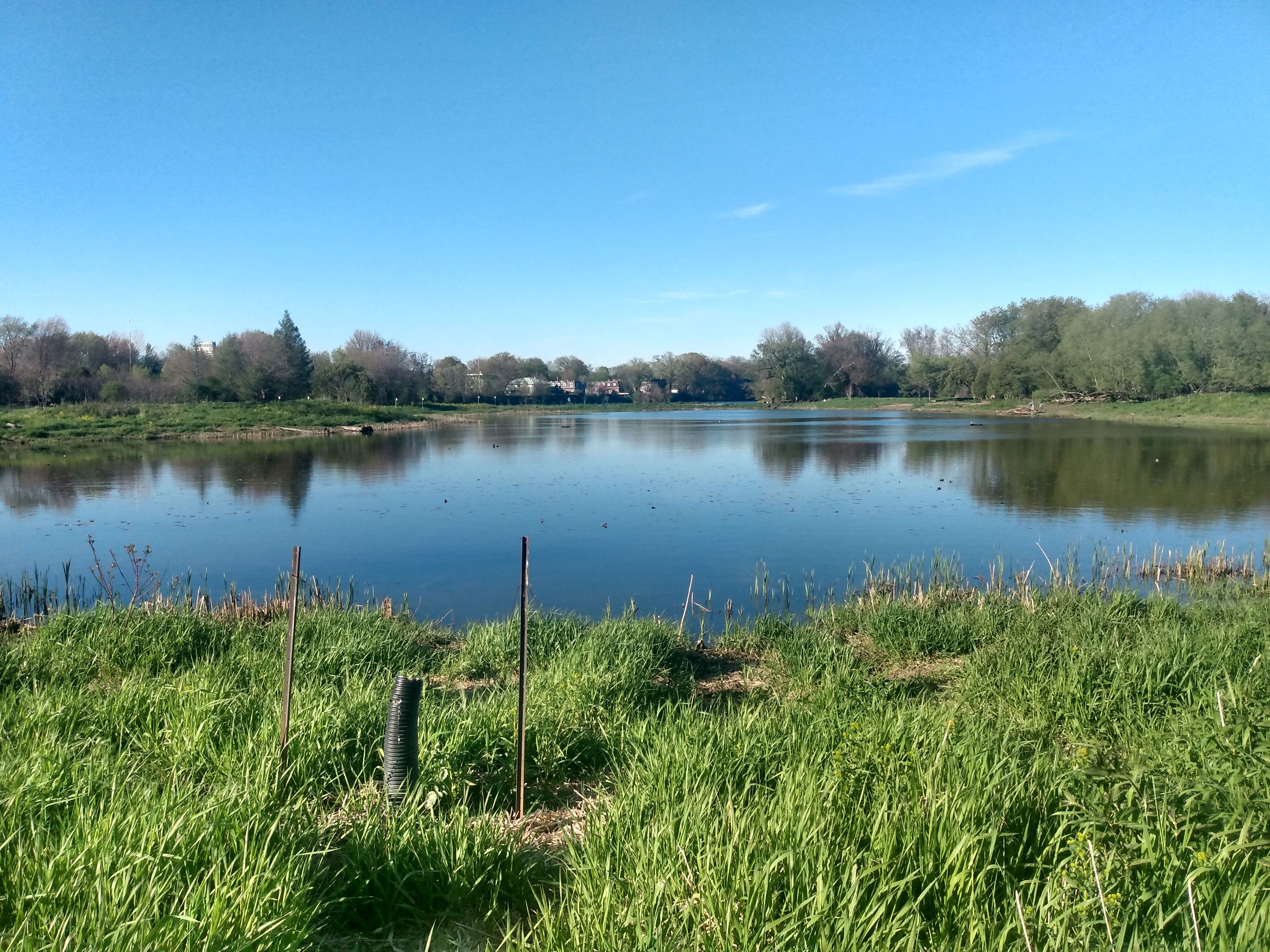
Brewer Park Pond

- Brewer Park Pond
- Constance Lake
- Lac des Chats
- Dow's Lake
- Lac Deschênes
- Lake Madawaska
- McKay Lake
- Mud Lake
- Mud Pond
- Sand Pits Lake
