= Western Escort Force W-6 =

Western Escort Force W-6 was a unit of ships of the Royal Canadian Navy serving in the Western Escort Force during the Second World War. W-6 provided protection for convoys on the east coast of Canada and into the Atlantic Ocean.

In December 1944 the group consisted of two Algerine-class minesweepers (HMCS Rockcliffe, and HMCS Oshawa) and two Flower-class corvettes (HMCS Oakville, and HMCS Saskatoon) By May 1945 Oakville had been replaced by the Flower-class corvette HMCS Dunvegan.

On 10 May 1945, after the official end of the German war, the German Type IX submarine U-889 surrendered to W-6 south of Newfoundland; she was brought into Shelburne, Noa Scotia on 13 May.
