= HMCS Dunvegan =

WWII Canadian Navy vessel

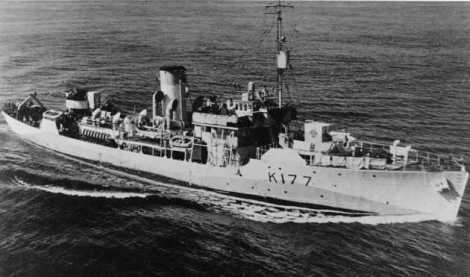
- HMCS Dunvegan

History

Canada
- Name: Dunvegan
- Ordered: 22 January 1940
- Builder: Marine Industries Ltd. Sorel
- Laid down: 30 August 1940
- Launched: 11 December 1940
- Commissioned: 9 September 1941
- Decommissioned: 3 July 1945
- Identification: Pennant number: K177
- Honours and awards: Atlantic 1941–44
- Fate: Sold to Venezuelan navy 1946

Venezuela
- Name: ARV Independencia
- Acquired: Purchased from Royal Canadian Navy 1946
- Commissioned: 1946
- Out of service: 1953
- Fate: Broken up 1953

General characteristics
- Class & type: Flower-class corvette
- Displacement: 950 long tons (970 t; 1,060 short tons)
- Length: 205 ft (62.48 m)
- Beam: 33 ft (10.06 m)
- Draught: 11.5 ft (3.51 m)
- Propulsion: Single shaft; 2 water tube boilers; 1 4-cyl. triple expansion steam engine, 2,750 hp (2,050 kW)
- Speed: 16 knots (29.6 km/h)
- Endurance: 3,450 nmi (6,390 km; 3,970 mi) at 12 kn (22 km/h; 14 mph)
- Complement: 6 officers, 79 men
- Sensors & processing systems: Radar – SW1C or 2C (later); Sonar – Type 123A, later Type 127DV
- Armament: 1 × BL 4 in (102 mm) Mk.IX single gun; 2 .50 cal machine gun twin; 2 Lewis .303 cal mg twin; 2 Mk.II depth charge throwers; 2 depth charge rails with 40 depth charges.; Originally fitted with minesweeping gear, later removed.

HMCS Dunvegan was a Flower-class corvette that served with the Royal Canadian Navy during the Second World War. She served primarily in the Battle of the Atlantic. After the war she was sold to the Venezuelan Navy. She was named for Dunvegan, Inverness County, Nova Scotia.

== Background ==
Flower-class corvettes like Dunvegan serving with the Royal Canadian Navy during the Second World War were different to earlier and more traditional sail-driven corvettes. The "corvette" designation was created by the French as a class of small warships; the Royal Navy borrowed the term for a period but discontinued its use in 1877. During the hurried preparations for war in the late 1930s, Winston Churchill reactivated the corvette class, needing a name for smaller ships used in an escort capacity, in this case based on a whaling ship design. The generic name "flower" was used to designate the class of these ships, which – in the Royal Navy – were named after flowering plants.

Corvettes commissioned by the Royal Canadian Navy during the Second World War were named after communities for the most part, to better represent the people who took part in building them. This idea was put forth by Admiral Percy W. Nelles. Sponsors were commonly associated with the community for which the ship was named. Royal Navy corvettes were designed as open sea escorts, while Canadian corvettes were developed for coastal auxiliary roles which was exemplified by their minesweeping gear. Eventually the Canadian corvettes would be modified to allow them to perform better on the open seas.

== Construction ==
Dunvegan was ordered 22 January 1940 as part of the 1939–1940 Flower-class building program. She was laid down on 30 August 1940 by Marine Industries Ltd. at Sorel and launched 11 December of that year. Dunvegan was commissioned 9 September 1941 at Sorel. She went in for her first refit in December 1941 for repairs which took until January 1942. A second refit took place in October 1943 where, in Baltimore, her fo'c'sle was extended. The refit took until December 1943 to complete.

== War service ==
After workups, Dunvegan joined Sydney Force. In November 1941 she transferred to Newfoundland Command where she was placed in unit N16 as an ocean escort for a short period. After returning from one of her first convoys, she was sent on to Halifax for repairs. Dunvegan returned to service with N12 of Newfoundland Command before joining Mid-Ocean Escort Force (MOEF) group C-2 in March 1942.

In June 1942 she joined Western Local Escort Force (WLEF) and in June 1943, assigned to escort group W-8. She served with that group until a major refit took her off duty. After workups in Bermuda, she returned to service with WLEF as a member of escort group W-6 which she served with until the end of the war. On 7 May 1945, Dunvegan was detached from convoy SC 175 to help HMCS Rockcliffe escort the captured German submarine U-889 back to port.

== Postwar service ==
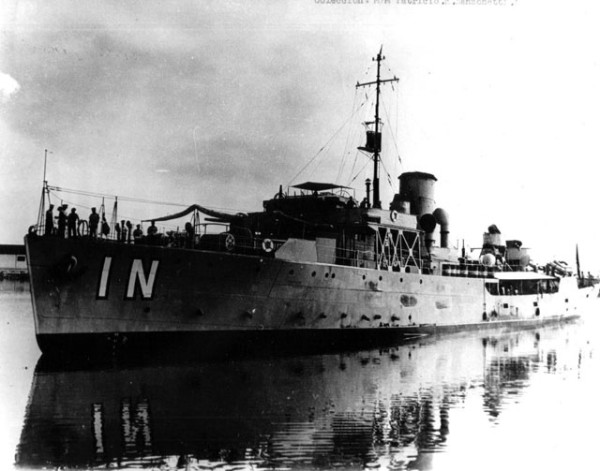
Independencia in Venezuelan Navy service

Dunvegan was paid off on 3 July 1945 at Sorel. In 1946 she was sold to Venezuela and renamed ARV Independencia. She served with the Venezuelan Navy into the 1950s until she was broken up in 1953.
