= Denis Coolican =

Canadian businessman and regional politician

Denis Murray Coolican (3 March 1913 – 20 October 1995) was a Canadian businessman and regional politician.

Born in Ottawa, Coolican graduated from the University of Ottawa and McGill University in Montreal. His educational background was in science and engineering. He joined the Canadian Bank Note Company eventually becoming its president. Just prior to his political career, he joined Brazilian Traction, Light and Power Company in a senior management capacity.

He became reeve of the village of Rockcliffe Park, Ontario in 1956 until 1966. In 1968 he was appointed the first Chair of the Regional Municipality of Ottawa-Carleton and remained in that position until retiring in 1978.

A regional social services building at 495 Richmond Road was named after Coolican in 1989. In 2003, following amalgamation of the region and its component cities into a single city of Ottawa, the building was declared surplus and sold to Canderel Realties. The redeveloped property no longer bears Coolican's name, but today the location of the Académie de Formation Linguistique language training centre.

The bilingual (English/French) Coolican was president of the Royal Canadian Geographical Society from 1977 to 1986, having been on that organisation's board since 1951.

He died aged 82 at Ottawa General Hospital several days after sustaining a fall.
