= Rockcliffe Park =

Rockcliffe Park Parc Rockcliffe (French)
- Neighbourhood
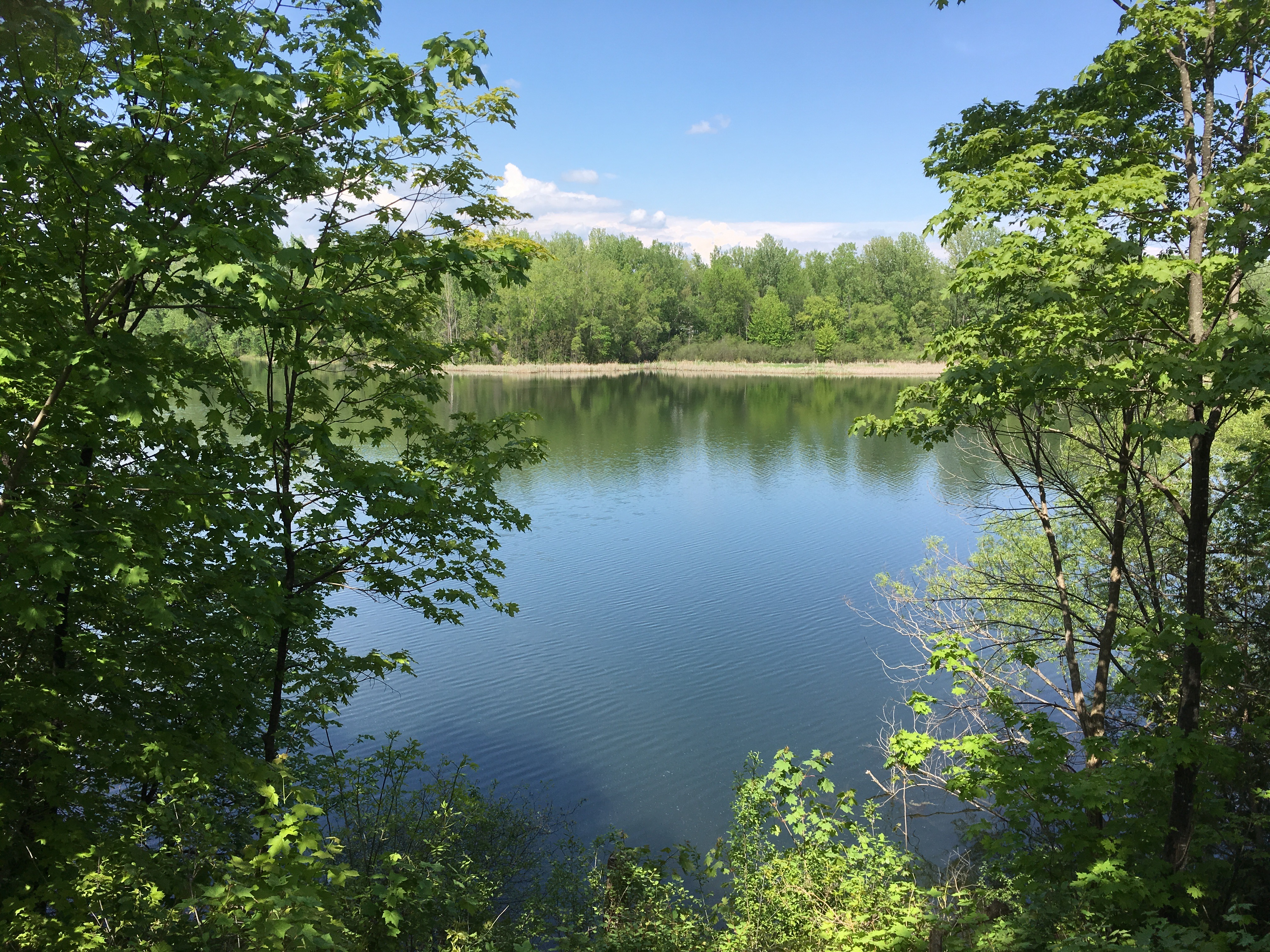
- McKay Lake

- Location in Ottawa
- Coordinates: 45°27′00″N 75°40′41″W
- Country: Canada
- Province: Ontario
- City: Ottawa
- Established: 1864
- Incorporated: 1908 (Police village of Rockcliffe Park); 1926 (Village of Rockcliffe Park)
- Annexation: 2001 (City of Ottawa)

Government
  - Mayor: Mark Sutcliffe
  - MPs: Mona Fortier
  - MPPs: Lucille Collard
  - Councillors: Rawlson King

Area
  - Total: 1.765 km^{2} (0.681 sq mi)
- Elevation: 70 m (230 ft)

Population (2021)
  - Total: 1,888
  - Density: 1,069.567/km^{2} (2,770.17/sq mi)
- Canada 2021 Census
- Time zone: UTC−5 (Eastern (EST))
  - Summer (DST): UTC−4 (EDT)

Rockcliffe Park (French: Parc Rockcliffe) is a neighbourhood in Rideau-Rockcliffe Ward, close to the centre of Ottawa, Ontario, Canada. Established in 1864, organized as a Police village in 1908, and an independent village from 1926, and ultimately amalgamated with the rest of Ottawa on January 1, 2001. As of 2011, it had a population of 2,021. In 1977 the entire village of Rockcliffe Park was designated a Heritage Conservation District. Rockcliffe Park is one of only a handful of surviving nineteenth-century communities of its kind in North America.

== Geography ==
The area is northeast of downtown, on the southern banks of the Ottawa River. It encompasses the small McKay Lake (a Meromictic lake), Sand Pits Lake (The Pond), and the Rockeries, a rock garden and playing field maintained by the National Capital Commission (NCC).

As it is long a separate village not under the jurisdiction of Ottawa's municipal government, Rockcliffe Park differs from the rest of the city. The village is characterized by its park-like setting, with varied topography – narrow curving roads without curbs or sidewalks, many trees, large lots and gardens, and houses set unobtrusively within a visually continuous, green landscape. It is relatively inaccessible to through traffic.

To the north, on the cliffs of the Ottawa River, there is public greenspace maintained by the National Capital Commission, also called Rockcliffe Park. It is transversed by a branch of the Sir George-Étienne Cartier Parkway. The parkway has several small parking lots along its length that enable visitors to enjoy the lawns, wooded areas, parks, and lookouts. There is also a large gazebo, and public restrooms. In the winter visitors can enjoy cross-country skiing and toboganning. The largely francophone neighbourhood of Vanier lies to the south.

== Heritage ==
Rockcliffe Park was founded by Thomas Keefer, in 1864, in accordance with the principles of the Picturesque tradition. The preservation of the natural landscape with roads lined with mature trees and curving around a varied topography, its rocky outcroppings and its lake and pond, as well as strong landscaping of individual properties, are all key to the Picturesque quality of the Village. The motto on the village coat-of-arms is “Inter Arboribus Floremus” - amidst the trees we flourish.

The entire village is a Heritage Conservation District. Heritage conservation district plans have been required for all heritage conservation districts in the province since 2005. After public consultations, and review by the City of Ottawa's Built Heritage Subcommittee and Planning Committee, the Rockcliffe Park Heritage Conservation District Plan was approved by Ottawa City Council in 2016. Legislation was enacted to adopt the Plan, pursuant to Section 41 of the Ontario Heritage Act. The Plan's objective is conservation of the park-like qualities of the area, and of the buildings and properties that contribute to its heritage character.

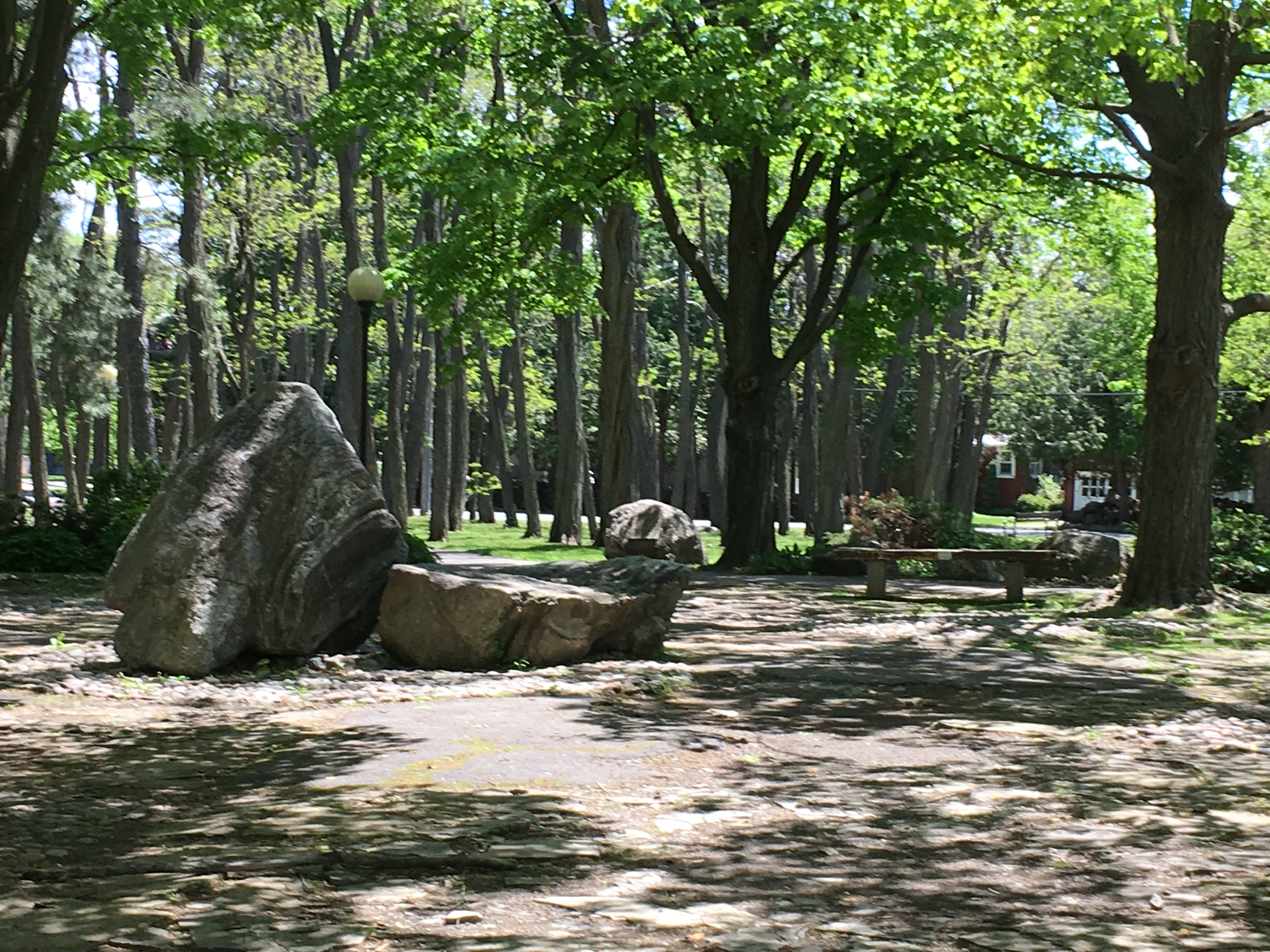
The Stone Circle, Rockcliffe Village Green

Since a heritage permit is now required prior to undertaking the alteration or demolition of a property, some property owners have raised concerns that market values will be negatively affected – see Ontario Heritage Act: Implementation and Issues. This heritage designation of properties was challenged in a landmark case of 270 Buchan Rd; in May 2019 the Local Planning Appeal Tribunal sided with the homeowner ordering that city to issue permit for demolition. The heritage consultant found incomplete evaluation forms and observations that don’t align with scores in a sample of 50 evaluations. The downfall of the city’s case to protect the home was an admission that 721 property evaluations in Rockcliffe Park were not done correctly and that more errors could be uncovered in the future. In the case of Statler v. Ottawa (City), 2017 CarswellOnt 18749 (O.M.B), the Ontario Municipal Board ("OMB") made the decision that Heritage Conservation District studies adopted prior to the 2005 amendments to the OHA have no force in law; and, that the pre-2005 OHA did not control property, only structures, resulting in the lack of legal authority to regulate land. "The decision of the OMB in Statler v. Ottawa (City) represents a warning to cities across the province that the Board (now the Local Planning Appeal Tribunal) will not allow municipalities to overreach their powers under the Ontario Heritage Act ("OHA")."

== Community ==
The community is home to one public elementary school, Rockcliffe Park Public School (RPPS), and two private schools, Elmwood School and Ashbury College. Located beside the elementary school is a community hall/library complex. The library was originally funded, built and staffed through the efforts of Rockcliffe residents, but is now a branch of the Ottawa Public Library, with computer access, a children's area, a young adult section and regular adult section. The library houses a special collection of art-related books called the Margaret A. Bailey collection.

In the community hall, there are memorabilia about and from HMCS Rockcliffe – an Algerine-class minesweeper that served during World War II – and a plaque and honour roll dedicated to residents who served.

There is no commercial activity in the village.

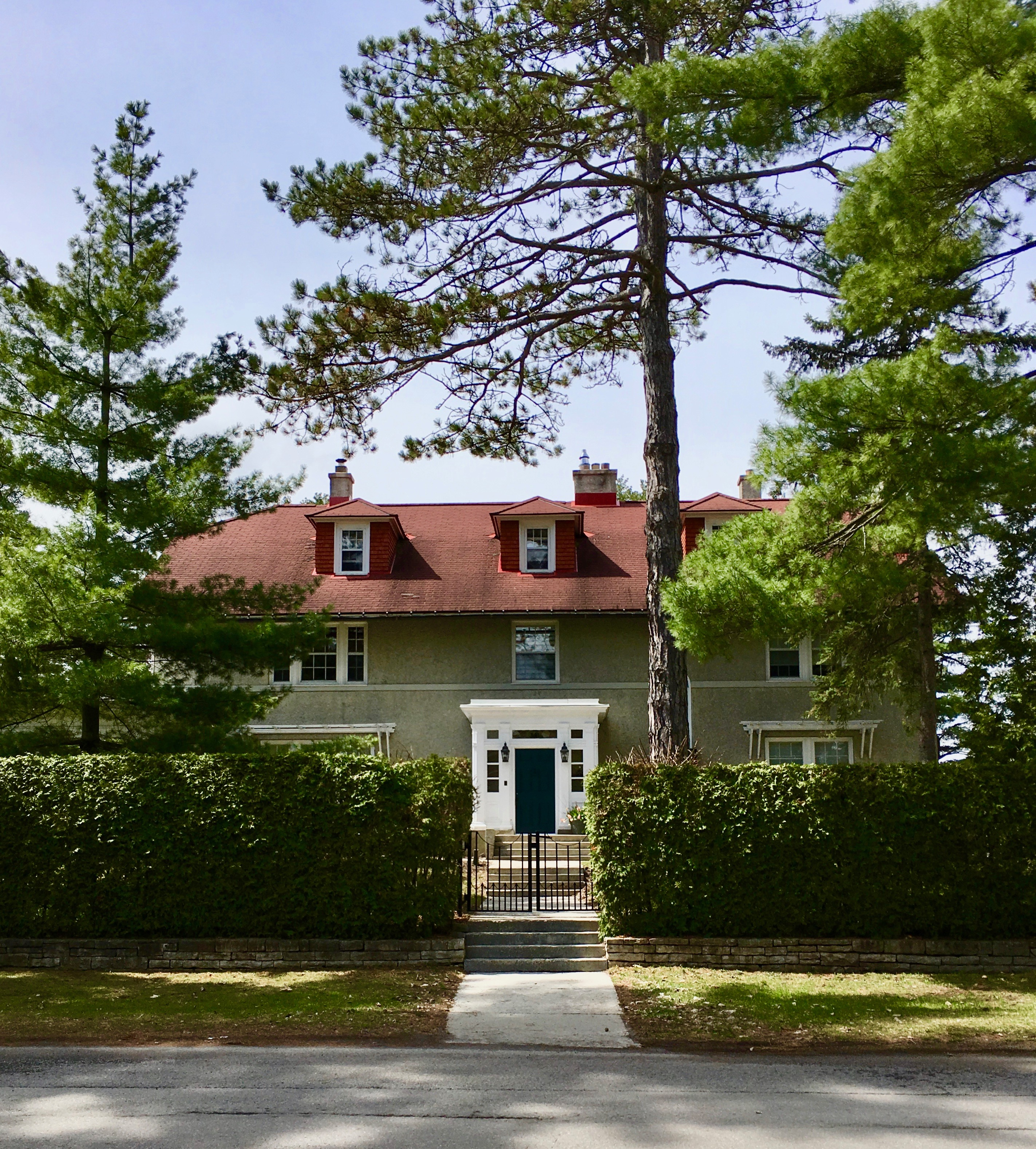
Stornoway, residence of Canada's Leader of the Opposition

Rockcliffe Park is and has been home to many Ottawa notables, including former prime ministers, senior civil servants, corporate leaders and many ambassadors to Canada. The Dutch royal family lived there during World War II. Their former home, Stornoway, is now the residence of the leader of the Canadian Official Opposition. Rockcliffe Park Public School, which was attended by the eldest princess, Beatrix, now calls its gymnasium Queen Juliana Hall.

== Demographics ==
Historical population
Year	Pop.	±%
1931	951	—
1941	1,480	+55.6%
1951	1,595	+7.8%
1956	2,097	+31.5%
1961	2,084	−0.6%
1966	2,246	+7.8%
1971	2,138	−4.8%
1976	2,115	−1.1%
1981	1,869	−11.6%
1986	2,174	+16.3%
1991	2,110	−2.9%
1996	1,995	−5.5%
2001	2,028	+1.7%
2006	1,927	−5.0%
2011	2,021	+4.9%
2016	1,932	−4.4%
2021	1,888	−2.3%
Populations for Census Tract 5050110.00; Source:

According to the Canada 2021 Census:

- Population: 1,888
- % Change (2016–2021): −2.3
- Dwellings: 781
- Area (km².): 1.77
- Density (persons per km².): 1069.6

Average salary in Rockcliffe Park is $186,000, whereas the average salary in Ottawa is $64,500, based on average total income in 2020 among recipients.

The benchmark price for a single family home in Rockcliffe Park was $1,516,300 in August 2017, compared to $398,400 for the city of Ottawa as a whole.

== Reeves and Mayors ==
The leading politician of Rockcliffe Park was known as the Reeve until the 1980s when that position was redesignated as Mayor.

- 1926–1928: David L. McKeand
- 1928–1932: R. E. Wodehouse
- 1933–1938: C. P. Edwards
- 1938–1954: D. P. Cruikshank
- 1954–1956: James Hyndman
- 1956–1965: Denis Coolican
- 1965–1974: Alan O. Gibbons
- 1974–1978: Ronald Clark
- 1978–1985: Beryl Plumptre
- 1985–2000: Patrick Murray

Following amalgamation into Ottawa, the role of Mayor of Rockcliffe Park was eliminated.

== See also ==
- List of Ottawa neighbourhoods
- Rideau Hall
- Ottawa/Rockcliffe Airport
- Rockcliffe Flying Club
