= HMCS Rockcliffe =

1943 Royal Canadian Navy minesweeper

History

Canada
- Name: Rockcliffe
- Namesake: Rockcliffe Park
- Builder: Port Arthur Shipbuilding Co. Ltd., Port Arthur
- Laid down: 23 December 1942
- Launched: 19 August 1943
- Commissioned: 30 September 1944
- Decommissioned: 28 July 1945
- Identification: Pennant number J335
- Recommissioned: 3 March 1947
- Decommissioned: 15 August 1950
- Identification: FSE 173
- Honours and awards: Atlantic 1945
- Fate: Sold for scrap 24 March 1960
- Badge: Argent, a squirrel sable sejant on a broken tree branch proper, holding between the forepaws a fid or marlin spike or

General characteristics
- Class & type: Algerine-class minesweeper
- Displacement: 1,030 long tons (1,047 t) (standard); 1,325 long tons (1,346 t) (deep)
- Length: 225 ft (69 m) o/a
- Beam: 35 ft 6 in (10.82 m)
- Draught: 12.25 ft 6 in (3.89 m)
- Installed power: 2 × Admiralty 3-drum boilers; 2,400 ihp (1,800 kW)
- Propulsion: 2 shafts; 2 vertical triple-expansion steam engines
- Speed: 16.5 knots (30.6 km/h; 19.0 mph)
- Range: 5,000 nmi (9,300 km; 5,800 mi) at 10 knots (19 km/h; 12 mph)
- Complement: 85
- Armament: 1 × QF 4 in (102 mm) Mk V anti-aircraft gun; 4 × twin Oerlikon 20 mm cannon; 1 × Hedgehog

HMCS Rockcliffe was a reciprocating engine-powered Algerine-class minesweeper built for the Royal Canadian Navy during the Second World War. Following the war, the ship saw service as training vessel before being scrapped in 1960.

== Design and description ==
The reciprocating group displaced 1,010–1,030 long tons (1,030–1,050 t) at standard load and 1,305–1,325 long tons (1,326–1,346 t) at deep load The ships measured 225 feet (68.6 m) long overall with a beam of 35 feet 6 inches (10.8 m). They had a draught of 12 feet 3 inches (3.7 m). The ships' complement consisted of 85 officers and ratings.

The reciprocating ships had two vertical triple-expansion steam engines, each driving one shaft, using steam provided by two Admiralty three-drum boilers. The engines produced a total of 2,400 indicated horsepower (1,800 kW) and gave a maximum speed of 16.5 knots (30.6 km/h; 19.0 mph). They carried a maximum of 660 long tons (671 t) of fuel oil that gave them a range of 5,000 nautical miles (9,300 km; 5,800 mi) at 10 knots (19 km/h; 12 mph).

The Algerine class was armed with a QF 4 in (102 mm) Mk V anti-aircraft gun and four twin-gun mounts for Oerlikon 20 mm cannon. The latter guns were in short supply when the first ships were being completed and they often got a proportion of single mounts. By 1944, single-barrel Bofors 40 mm mounts began replacing the twin 20 mm mounts on a one for one basis. All of the ships were fitted for four throwers and two rails for depth charges. Many Canadian ships omitted their sweeping gear in exchange for a 24-barrel Hedgehog spigot mortar and a stowage capacity for 90+ depth charges.

== Construction and career ==
Named after Rockcliffe Park, a suburb of Ottawa, Ontario, Rockcliffe was laid down on 23 December 1942 by Port Arthur Shipbuilding Co. Ltd. at Port Arthur, Ontario. The ship was launched on 19 August 1943 and commissioned into the Royal Canadian Navy at Port Arthur on 30 September 1944.

Following her commissioning, Rockcliffe sailed up the St. Lawrence River to Halifax, Nova Scotia. She was sent to Bermuda to work up and upon her return to Halifax in mid-December 1944, was assigned to the Western Escort Force for convoy escort duties in the Battle of the Atlantic. The minesweeper joined escort group W-6 with which she remained until June 1945 when it was disbanded. On 10 May 1945 she was part of the group that captured the German Type IX submarine U-889. She escorted the submarine to Shelburne, Nova Scotia.

Rockcliffe was paid off into reserve on 28 July 1945 at Sydney, Nova Scotia, she was then transferred to the west coast arriving at Esquimalt, British Columbia on 14 January 1946. On 3 March 1947, the minesweeper was recommissioned for use as a training ship. In 1948, the minesweeper was used for oceanographic duties. Rockcliffe was paid off on 15 August 1950 for the final time. Rockcliffe was sold for scrap on 24 March 1960 and broken up at Vancouver.

After decommissioning the ship's bell was presented to the officer's mess at CFB Rockcliffe on 30 May 1967 and formed part of the chandelier.

== See also ==
- List of ships of the Canadian Navy

== Bibliography ==
- Arbuckle, J. Graeme (1987). Badges of the Canadian Navy. Halifax, Nova Scotia: Nimbus Publishing. ISBN 0-920852-49-1.
- Chesneau, Roger, ed. (1980). Conway's All the World's Fighting Ships 1922–1946. Greenwich, UK: Conway Maritime Press. ISBN 0-85177-146-7.
- Colledge, J. J.; Warlow, Ben (2006) [1969]. Ships of the Royal Navy: The Complete Record of All Fighting Ships of the Royal Navy from the 15th Century to the Present (3rd Rev ed.). London: Chatham Publishing. ISBN 978-1-86176-281-8. OCLC 67375475.
- Lenton, H. T. (1998). British & Empire Warships of the Second World War. Annapolis, Maryland: Naval Institute Press. ISBN 1-55750-048-7.
- Macpherson, Ken; Barrie, Ron (2002). The Ships of Canada's Naval Forces 1910-2002 (3 ed.). St. Catharines, Ontario: Vanwell Publishing. ISBN 1-55125-072-1.
