= McKay Lake (Ottawa) =

Lake in Ontario, Canada

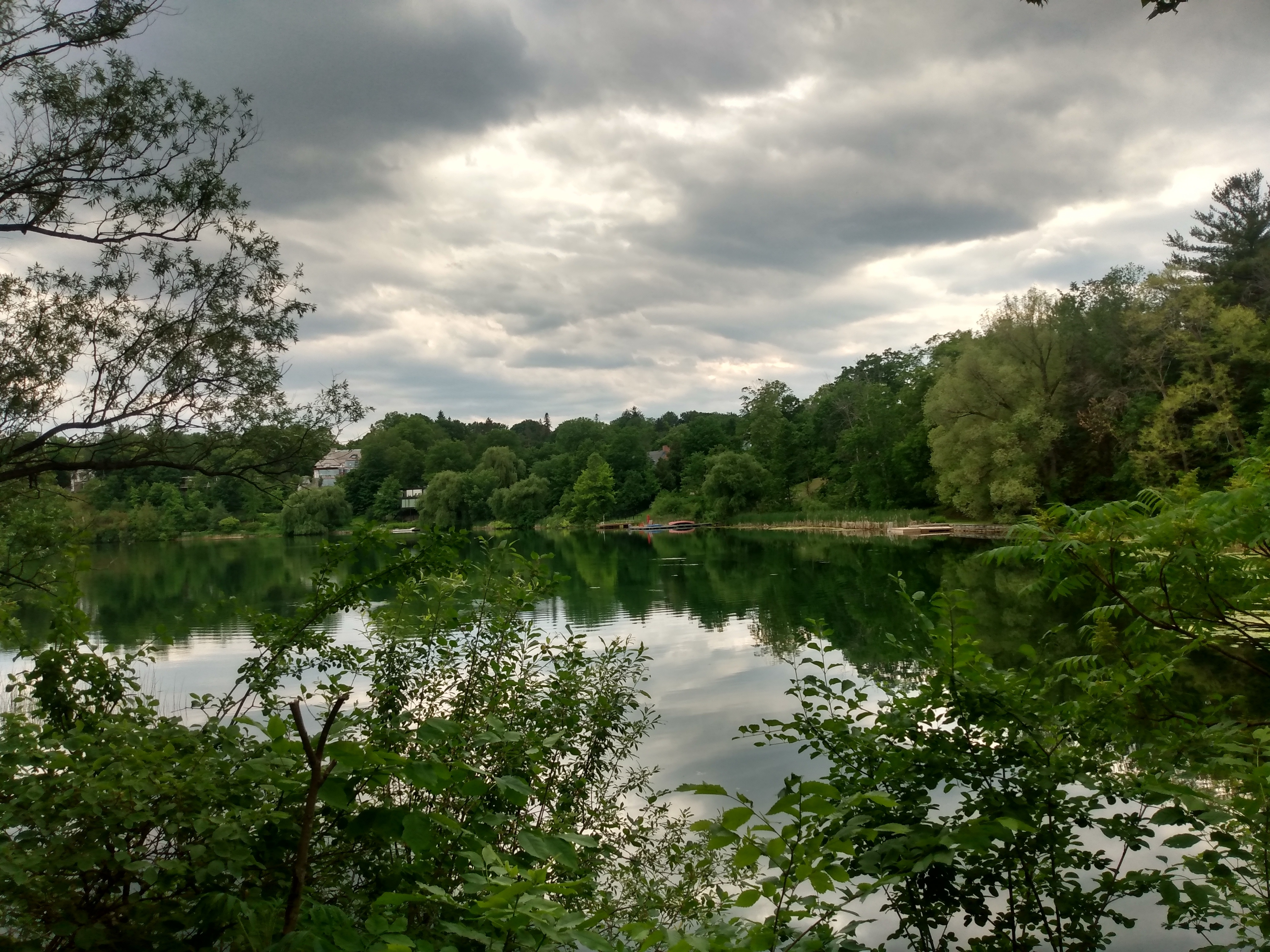

- Location within Ontario
- Location: Eastern Ontario
- Coordinates: 45°27′06″N 75°40′10″W
- Primary inflows: Sand Pits Lake (The Pond)
- Primary outflows: Ottawa River
- Catchment area: 140 hectares (350 acres)
- Basin countries: Canada
- Max. length: 451 m (1,480 ft)
- Max. width: 320 m (1,050 ft)
- Surface elevation: 46 m (151 ft)
- Settlements: Ottawa

McKay Lake (formerly Hemlock Lake, McKay's Lake, or MacKay Lake) is a meromictic lake located in the former Village of Rockcliffe Park in Ottawa, Ontario, Canada.

The lake is named for Thomas McKay, one of the founders of Ottawa, who once owned all of Rockcliffe Park in the 19th century, including the lake. The lake was officially named McKay Lake in 1954 after Rockcliffe Park Village Council passed a by-law. Prior to that the lake often appeared on maps as "Hemlock Lake", but locals referred to it as McKay Lake.

The lake was once a swimming hole. Today, the west side of the lake is privately owned and lined with mansions and a public path known as the "Dog Walk" (a closed portion of Lansdowne Road), while the east side of the lake is owned by the City of Ottawa and is home to the Caldwell-Carver Conservation Area. Today, public swimming is banned in the lake due to its "oozy/squishy/mushy" bottom. The lake is drained by an intermittent stream that travels north into the Ottawa River. Its watershed includes the nearby Beechwood Cemetery and the next-door Sand Pits Lake, better known as "The Pond". The lake is fed by an intermittent stream that flows into the lake from the southeast.

== Geology ==
The lake originated about 9000 years ago as a plunge pool along a narrow channel between escarpments which are now Rockcliffe Park (the park north of the lake) and Beechwood Cemetery. Strong currents and eddies over the escarpments eroded the marine clay, exhuming a pre-existing glaciofluvial deposit, causing the lake to form. Clay deposits at least 5 metres thick from the Last Glacial Period underlies the northern, eastern and southern boundaries of the lake. The lake also contains deposits of gravel, gritty sand, lacustrine sand and marl.

== Flora and fauna ==
Established trees that line the lake include the trembling aspen, balsam poplar, as well as planted white pines, tamaracks, birch, hawthorns, sumacs, red-osier dogwood and white spruce. Other common trees include the Manitoba maple, red maple, sugar maple, white elm, basswood and bur oak. The Norway maple is an invasive species in the area. The south and east sides of the lake is home to wetland marshes, which is home to Scirpus, common cattails and pockets of pickerelweed with royal ferns, sensitive ferns and speckled alder along the shoreline. Other species include marsh fern and swamp milkweed, glossy buckthorn and common buckthorn. Aquatic plants include water milfoil, yellow pond-lily, lesser duckweed, greater bladderwort and purple loosestrife. Animals that use the lake include muskrat, snapping turtles, painted turtles, several species of herons and kingfishers. Historically, the lake was home to otters and mink. Small brown bullhead fish are common, as well as shiners, sunfish, pumpkinseed, common carp, goldfish and largemouth bass. Less common in the lake are mussels and crayfish.

== History ==
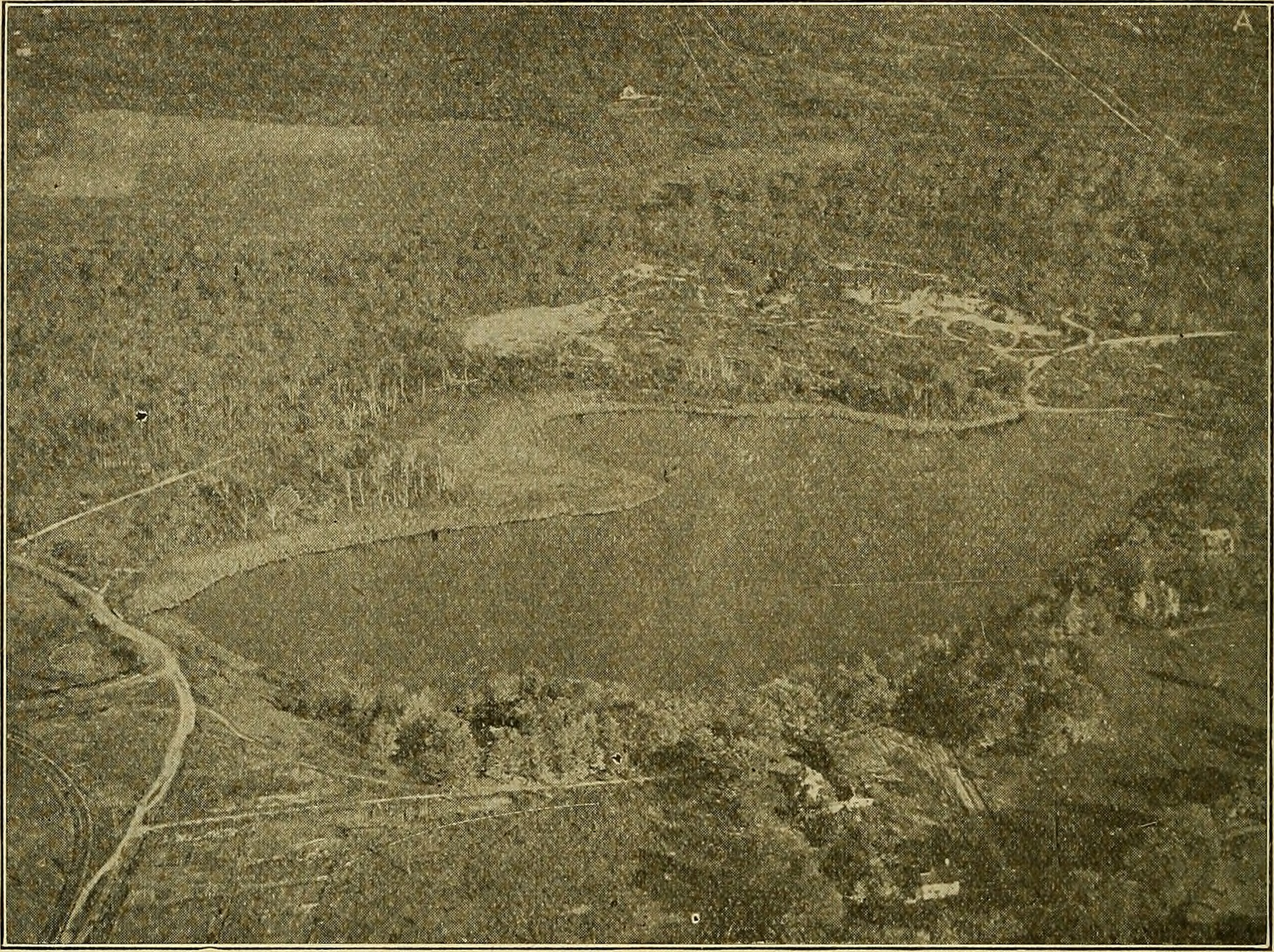
McKay Lake in 1931

Swimming was popular in the lake in the 19th century and early 20th century. The lake was also used for herds of cattle to drink from in the 19th century. Pollution caused a temporary ban to swimming in 1949. In 1954, hundreds of dead fish caused by a "strange malady" were found covering the shore of the lake.

Beginning in 1963, the lake was the site of the dumping of fill into the marsh of the lake, which was followed by major landfill activity in 1968, blamed on Rockcliffe Park Realty Ltd., who had been hauling fill from the defunct Eastview Dump, which was being excavated to build a home for the aged. Dumping material was of a "soggy nature and had an offensive odor" (sic), and "contained broken bottles, old tin cans, car mufflers, old washing machines and rubber tires". Initially a dumping permit was granted by the Rockcliffe Park Village Council, however they passed a by-law in 1969 banning dumping into the lake. However, more dumping activity picked up in 1972, dumping was halted under orders of the Ontario Environmental Protection Act. The land around the lake was sold in 1980, allowing for the Village of Rockcliffe Park to take over the area, in exchange for permitting land east of The Pond to be developed into condominiums.

The area around the lake was designated as a "Conservation zone" by the then-Village of Rockcliffe Park in 1993. The west side of the lake was the site of major storm sewer project in 1996, which was followed a revegetation plan. The Village officially designated the area as a "Heritage Conservation District" under the Ontario Heritage Act in 1997.
