= Sand Pits Lake =

Lake in Ontario, Canada

- The Pond
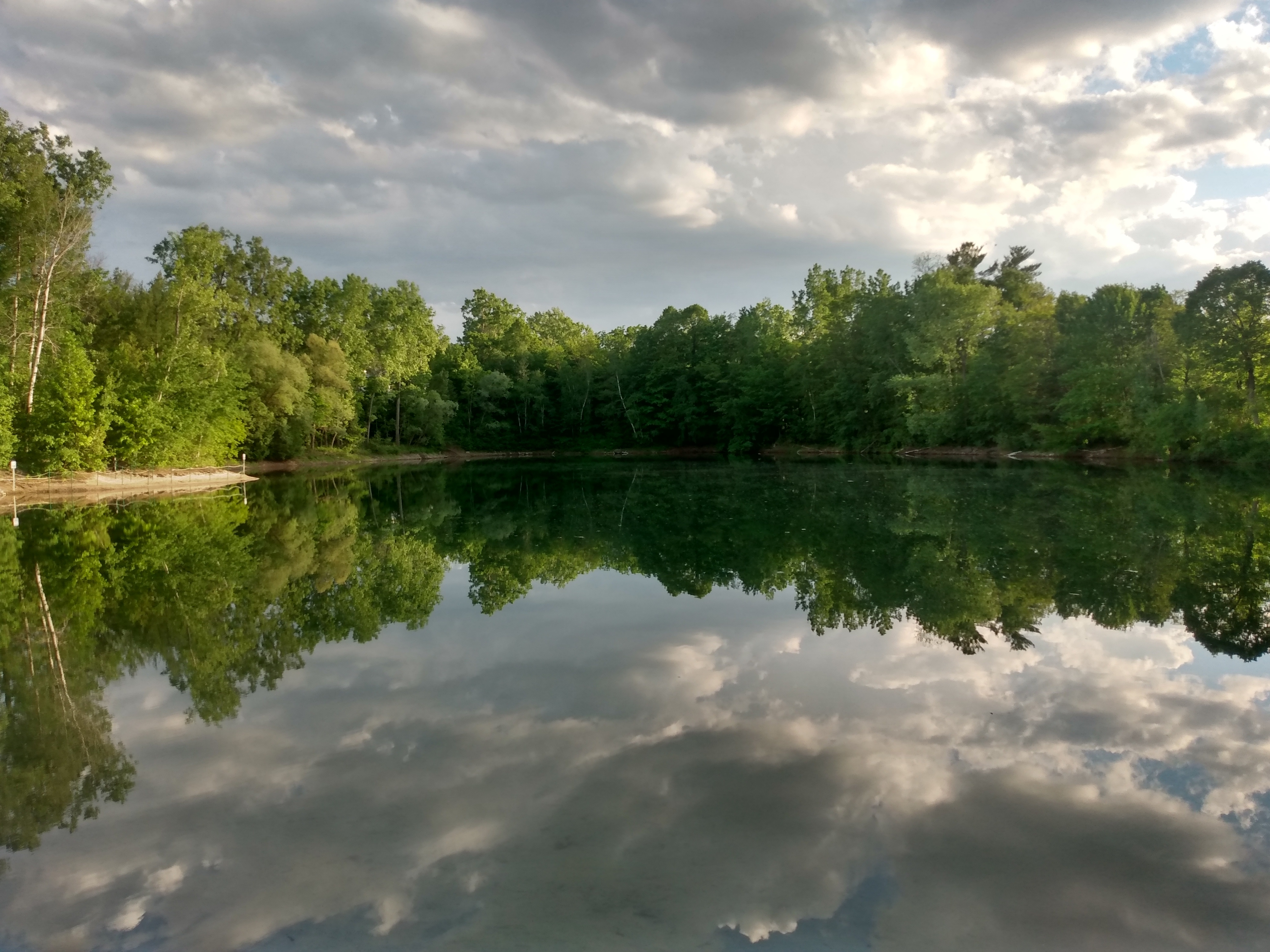

- Location within Ontario
- Location: Eastern Ontario
- Coordinates: 45°27′04″N 75°39′59″W
- Primary outflows: McKay Lake
- Basin countries: Canada
- Max. length: 183 m (600 ft)
- Max. width: 98 m (322 ft)
- Surface elevation: 46 m (151 ft)
- Settlements: Ottawa

Sand Pits Lake, better known as The Pond or McKay Pond is an artificial lake located next to McKay Lake in the Rockcliffe Park neighbourhood of Ottawa, Ontario, Canada.

The lake is a popular location for swimming, but it does not have any beach facilities such as washrooms or picnic areas. Swimming is only permitted between 7am and 2pm. The city often pumps groundwater into the lake to keep water levels high. It is part of the Caldwell-Carver Conservation Area.

The lake is home to great blue herons, black-crowned night herons, green herons, double-crested cormorants, river otters, green frogs, snapping turtles, squirrels and many types of fish.

The location of the lake was used as a sand and gravel pit from 1890 to 1949, and was known as the "Sandpits". Afterwards, the pit filled with water, becoming a swimming hole. An Ontario Municipal Board (OMB) ruling in 1975 allowed for public access to the pond. The OMB approved a 102-unit luxury housing development in the area in 1981, and construction began in 1983.
