= Manion Corners =

Community in Ottawa, Ontario, Canada

- Dispersed rural community
- Interactive map of Manion Corners
- Coordinates: 45°15′29″N 76°03′53″W
- Country: Canada
- Province: Ontario
- City: Ottawa

Manion Corners is a community in West Carleton-March Ward in Ottawa, Ontario.
