= Carlington Park =

Park in Ottawa, Canada

Coordinates: 45°22′25″N 75°44′36″W

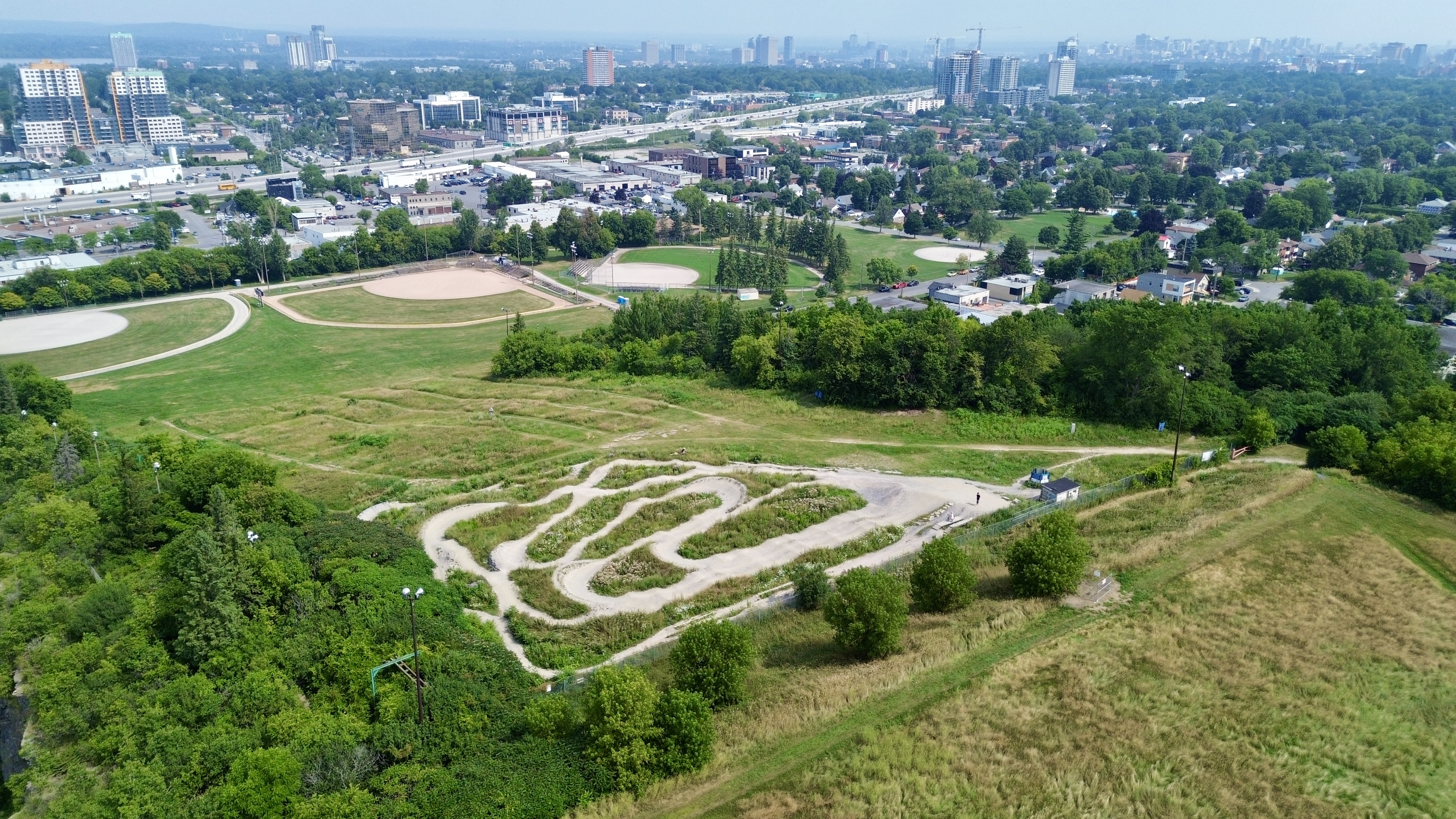
Carlington Park & Hill

Carlington Park is a large park in Ottawa, Ontario, Canada. It contains one of Ottawa's largest hills. It is a City of Ottawa owned and operated park. Located in Carlington, a neighbourhood in the west end of Ottawa, it is bordered by McBride, Morriset, Clyde, and Laperriere street. Its official address is 1640 Laperriere Ave, Ottawa, ON, however the address of Carlington Hill is 1599 Morisset Ave, Ottawa, ON.

Most of the park is an Urban Environmental Protection Zone, declared by the City of Ottawa in 2005.

== Features ==
=== Carlington Hill ===
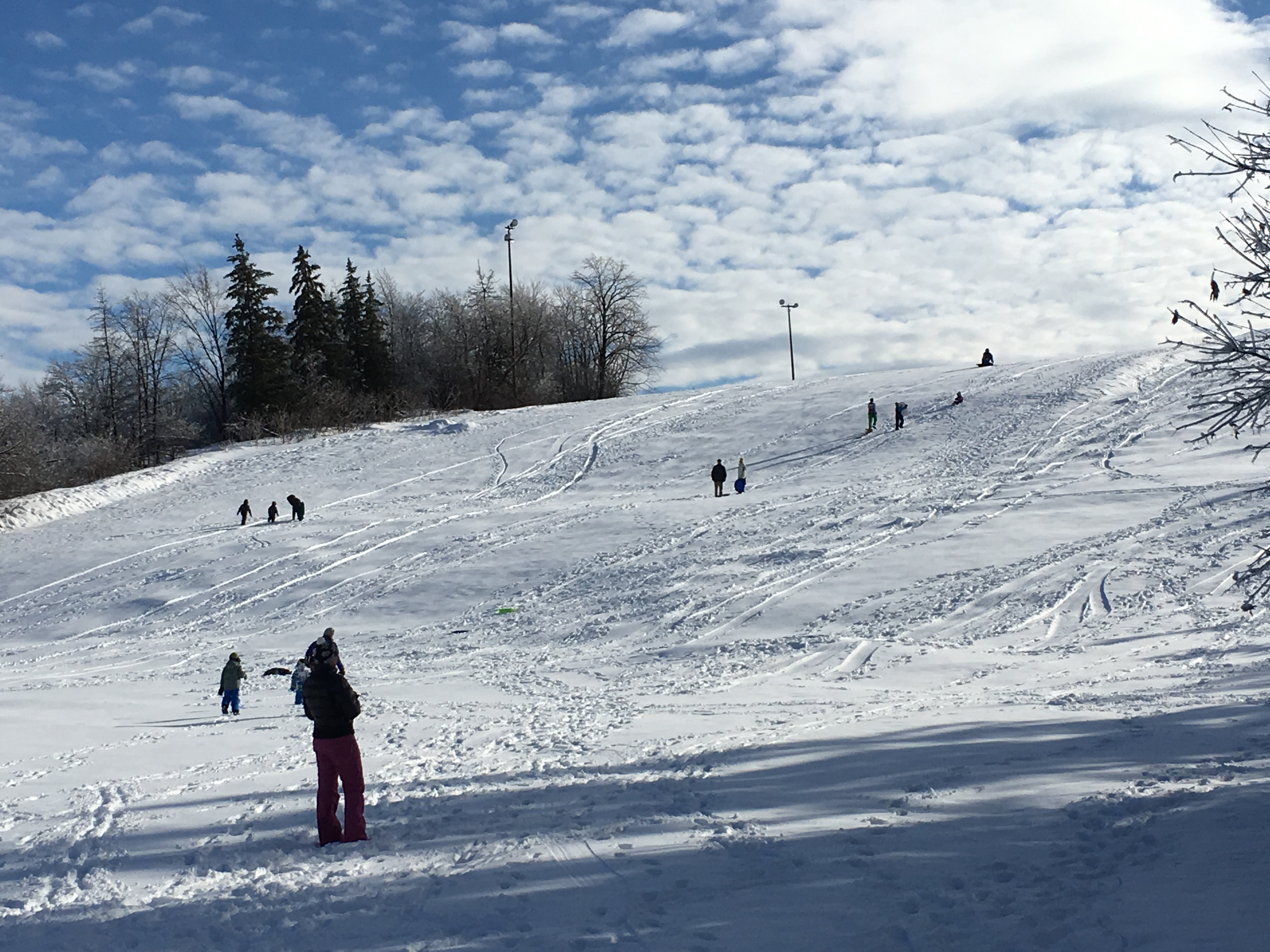
Sledding at Carlington Hill

One of the most notable features being Carlington Hill (frequently called Dulude Hill), a large hill with long gradual slopes. Part of it was formerly a ski hill with a tow lift (known previously as Anne Heggtveit Hill), but is now used as a City of Ottawa approved sledding hill. The western part of the hill was quarried for limestone, which was crushed and used as lime for the production of cement. The former quarry is now used as a city snow dump. Also, on top of the hill is the Carlington Heights Reservoir and Pump Station which supplies approximately one third of the city's water. Urban forests and green spaces surround the park, but are often frequents victims of dumping.

=== Bike Pump Track ===
In 2011, planning started for a mountain bike course atop of the hill. With a budget of $300 000, the city completed the project in late 2019. Since then, there have been approximately 30 000 visits from across the city.

=== Other ===
It has multiple baseball diamonds, which are frequently used for small-game baseball. There is also a community garden with 5 raised beds, and more planning to be added soon.

== History ==
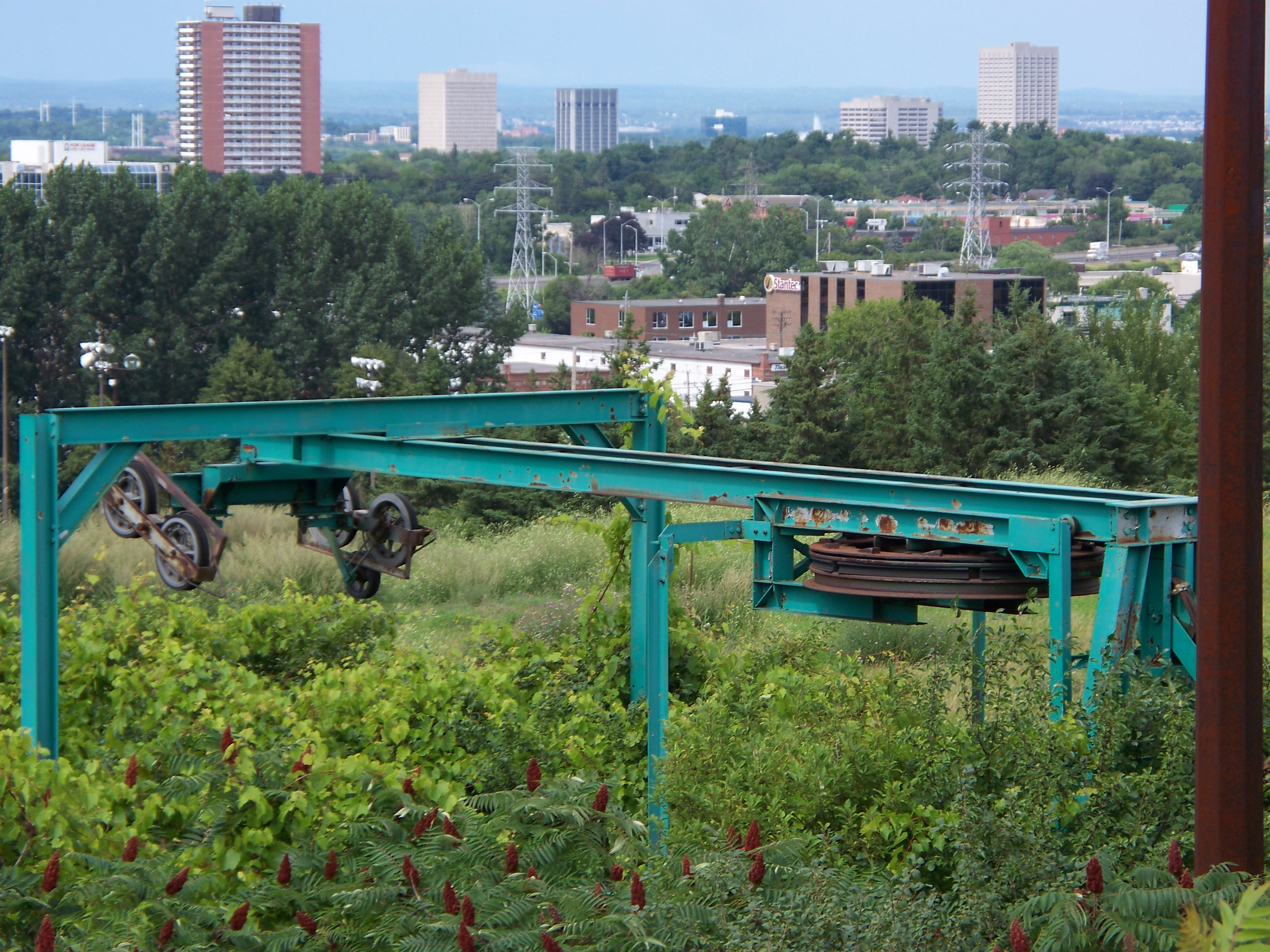
Remains of the ski lift of Anne Heggtveit Hill on what is Carlington Hill.

Carlington Hill, the most notable feature of the park, is a former ski hill. It was known as Anne Heggtveit Hill, named after Anne Heggtveit who won Canada's first Olympic gold medal in alpine skiing.

The hill's construction finished on December 9, 1965 after being under construction for 5 years. It was the site of a city former landfill, with an estimated 15 feet of garbage covering the park. There are still pieces of trash found in the nearby woods as a remainder of the former dump. It had a high-capacity T-bar lift able to carry 1,400 skiers up the hill every hour, which are still there today. The hill closed in 1987, after it going unused for almost a decade. Efforts were made to make the hill "more natural", however the middle part of the hill still remains clear, and is used for tobogganing.
