= German submarine U-889 =

German World War II submarine

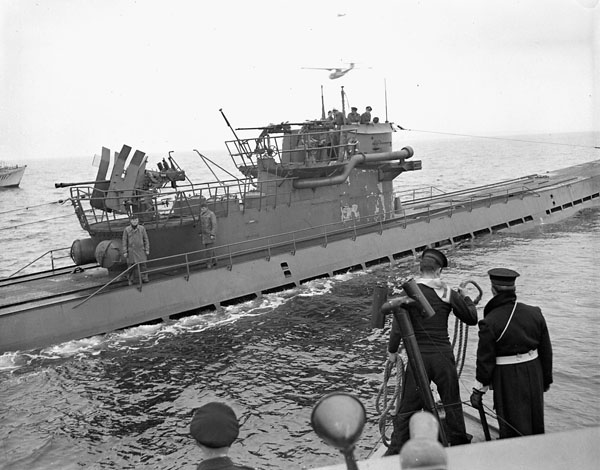
- Surrender of U-889 near Shelburne, Nova Scotia, 13 May 1945

History

Nazi Germany
- Name: U-889
- Ordered: 2 April 1942
- Builder: DeSchiMAG AG Weser, Bremen
- Yard number: 1097
- Laid down: 13 September 1943
- Launched: 4 April 1944
- Commissioned: 5 August 1944
- Fate: Surrendered on 13 May 1945

Canada
- Acquired: 14 May 1945
- Decommissioned: December 1945
- Fate: Transferred to the US Navy

General characteristics
- Class & type: Type IXC/40 submarine
- Displacement: 1,144 t (1,126 long tons) surfaced; 1,257 t (1,237 long tons) submerged
- Length: 76.76 m (251 ft 10 in) o/a; 58.75 m (192 ft 9 in) pressure hull
- Beam: 6.86 m (22 ft 6 in) o/a; 4.44 m (14 ft 7 in) pressure hull
- Height: 9.60 m (31 ft 6 in)
- Draught: 4.67 m (15 ft 4 in)
- Installed power: 4,400 PS (3,200 kW; 4,300 bhp) (diesels); 1,000 PS (740 kW; 990 shp) (electric)
- Propulsion: 2 shafts; 2 × diesel engines; 2 × electric motors
- Speed: 18.3 knots (33.9 km/h; 21.1 mph) surfaced; 7.3 knots (13.5 km/h; 8.4 mph) submerged
- Range: 13,850 nmi (25,650 km; 15,940 mi) at 10 knots (19 km/h; 12 mph) surfaced; 63 nmi (117 km; 72 mi) at 4 knots (7.4 km/h; 4.6 mph) submerged
- Test depth: 230 m (750 ft)
- Complement: 4 officers, 44 enlisted
- Sensors & processing systems: FuMB-26 Tunis
- Armament: 6 × torpedo tubes (4 bow, 2 stern); 22 × 53.3 cm (21 in) torpedoes; 1 × 10.5 cm (4.1 in) SK C/32 deck gun (180 rounds); 1 × 3.7 cm (1.5 in) Flak M42 AA gun; 2 x twin 2 cm (0.79 in) C/30 AA guns

Service record
- Part of: 4th U-boat Flotilla; 4 August 1944 – 14 March 1945; 33rd U-boat Flotilla; 15 March – 8 May 1945
- Identification codes: M 37 894
- Commanders: Kptlt. Friedrich Braeucker; 4 August 1944 – 13 May 1945
- Operations: 1 patrol: 5 April – 13 May 1945
- Victories: None

German submarine U-889 was a Type IXC/40 U-boat of Nazi Germany's Kriegsmarine during World War II.

== Design ==
German Type IXC/40 submarines were slightly larger than the original Type IXCs. U-Y had a displacement of 1,144 tonnes (1,126 long tons) when at the surface and 1,257 tonnes (1,237 long tons) while submerged. The U-boat had a total length of 76.76 m (251 ft 10 in), a pressure hull length of 58.75 m (192 ft 9 in), a beam of 6.86 m (22 ft 6 in), a height of 9.60 m (31 ft 6 in), and a draught of 4.67 m (15 ft 4 in). The submarine was powered by two MAN M 9 V 40/46 supercharged four-stroke, nine-cylinder diesel engines producing a total of 4,400 metric horsepower (3,240 kW; 4,340 shp) for use while surfaced, two Siemens-Schuckert 2 GU 345/34 double-acting electric motors producing a total of 1,000 shaft horsepower (1,010 PS; 750 kW) for use while submerged. She had two shafts and two 1.92 m (6 ft) propellers. The boat was capable of operating at depths of up to 230 metres (750 ft).

The submarine had a maximum surface speed of 18.3 knots (33.9 km/h; 21.1 mph) and a maximum submerged speed of 7.3 knots (13.5 km/h; 8.4 mph). When submerged, the boat could operate for 63 nautical miles (117 km; 72 mi) at 4 knots (7.4 km/h; 4.6 mph); when surfaced, she could travel 13,850 nautical miles (25,650 km; 15,940 mi) at 10 knots (19 km/h; 12 mph).

U-Y was fitted with six 53.3 cm (21 in) torpedo tubes (four fitted at the bow and two at the stern) with 22 torpedoes. For anti-aircraft defence it carried a 3.7 cm (1.5 in) Flakzwilling M43U on the DLM42 mount as well as two twin 2 cm (0.79 in) Flak 30 anti-aircraft guns (no deck gun, as was common for late war boats of this type).

The boat had a complement of forty-eight.

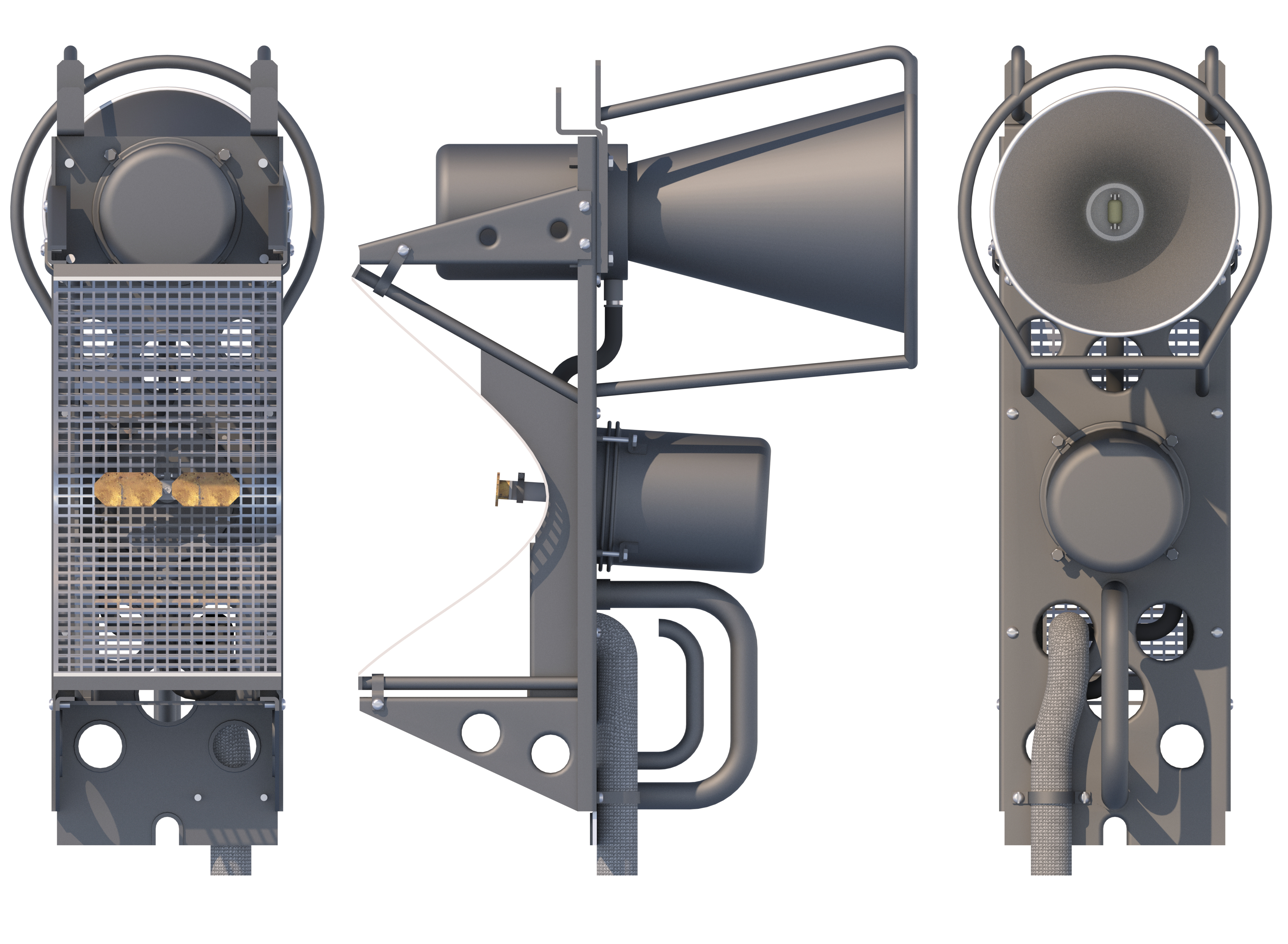
FuMB-26 Tunis radar detection

U-889 was fixed with the FuMB-26 Tunis antennae. The FuMB 26 Tunis combined the FuMB Ant. 24 Fliege and FuMB Ant. 25 Cuba II antennas. It could be mounted in either the Direction Finder Antenna Loop and separately on the bridge.

== Service history ==
U-889 was laid down on 13 September 1943 at the DeSchiMAG AG Weser shipyard in Bremen and was commissioned on 4 August 1944, with Kapitänleutnant Friedrich Braeucker (Crew IV/37) as commander. Until 14 March 1945 she was attached to 4th U-boat Flotilla for training. She was then assigned to 33rd U-boat Flotilla, a combat unit based at Flensburg. Her first, and only, active patrol started on 5 April 1945. She sank no vessels before the war ended and subsequently surrendered to a Canadian patrol.

== Surrender ==
After the German surrender on 8 May 1945, the German High Command ordered all U-boats to surrender. On the afternoon of 10 May, U-889 was spotted south of Newfoundland by a RCAF airplane, steaming at 10 knots and flying a black flag of surrender. The RCAF plane radioed to nearby Western Escort Force W-6 who intercepted the submarine an hour later. U-889 was ordered to head to Bay Bulls, Newfoundland. On 13 May, U-889 was turned over to the frigates HMCS Buckingham and HMCS Inch Arran who escorted her to Shelburne Harbour where she was boarded and Braeucker, her commanding officer, made a formal surrender.

On 14 May 1945, U-889 was commissioned into the RCN and decommissioned in December 1945.

U-889 was one of ten U-boats allocated to the United States as part of the Tripartite Naval Commission sitting in Berlin in November 1945. She sailed to Portsmouth, New Hampshire on 10 January 1946 and experiments were conducted on her special hydrophone gear. She was sunk off Cape Cod on 20 November 1947.

== See also ==
- German submarine U-190 - also captured and commissioned by the Royal Canadian Navy
- Military history of Nova Scotia

== Bibliography ==
- Busch, Rainer; Röll, Hans-Joachim (1999). German U-boat commanders of World War II : a biographical dictionary. Translated by Brooks, Geoffrey. London, Annapolis, Md: Greenhill Books, Naval Institute Press. ISBN 1-55750-186-6.
- Busch, Rainer; Röll, Hans-Joachim (1999). Der U-Boot-Krieg, 1939-1945: Deutsche U-Boot-Verluste von September 1939 bis Mai 1945 [German U-boat losses from September 1939 to May 1945] (in German). Vol. IV. Hamburg, Berlin, Bonn: Mittler. ISBN 3-8132-0514-2.
- Gröner, Eric; Jung, Dieter; Maass, Martin (1991). German Warships 1815-1945: U-boats and Mine Warfare Vessels. Vol. 2. Translated by Thomas, Keith; Magowan, Rachel. London: Conway Maritime Press. ISBN 0-85177-593-4.
