= Roland Armitage =

Canadian politician (1925–2024)

Roland Armitage OOnt

Mayor of West Carleton
- In office December 1, 1991 – December 1, 1994
- Preceded by: Eric Craig
- Succeeded by: Dwight Eastman

Personal details
- Born: February 8, 1925 South March, Ontario, Canada
- Died: June 19, 2024 (aged 99) Ottawa, Ontario, Canada
- Party: Ontario Liberal Party
- Spouse(s): Mary Spearman (m. 1947; died 1985); Karen Flahven (m. 1990; died 2013)
- Children: 4

Roland Montgomery Armitage OOnt (February 8, 1925 – June 19, 2024) was a Canadian veterinarian, businessman, veteran, horse trainer and politician. Armitage served as mayor of West Carleton Township, Ontario from 1991 to 1994. He also served on the council for the Regional Municipality of Ottawa-Carleton.

== Early life ==
Armitage was born on February 8, 1925, on a homestead on March Road in South March, Ontario to parents Godfrey and Joan Armitage (née Foote). His family had lived in the area since around 1836.

In 1942, while attending Ottawa Technical High School, he and a friend enlisted to join the Canadian Army to fight in World War II. He lied about his age, as he was only 17 at the time. He joined the 1st Canadian Parachute Battalion to train in Fort Benning, Georgia, but was sent home to mature. He then went to Camp Petawawa to train as a motorcycle dispatch rider, and was sent to England. While recovering from an injury, he was asked to join the 5th Battery 3rd Medium Regiment, Royal Canadian Artillery due to his "keen night vision".

As a member of the 3rd Medium Regiment, he took part in the Normandy invasion and the liberation of France, and was part of the second wave to land on Juno Beach. Following the invasion, he was promoted to Sergeant.

After the war, Armitage attended the Ontario Veterinary College at the University of Guelph, graduating in 1951.

After graduating, he lived in Shawville, Quebec for 20 years before moving to Dunrobin, Ontario.

He bred and raced horses, and was track veterinarian at Connaught Park in Aylmer, Quebec. Armitage served as the president of the Canadian Standardbred Horse Society from 1972 to 1974 and the Canadian Trotting Association from 1976 to 1981. He was general manager of Rideau Carleton Raceway for nine years.

He was named Canadian veterinarian of the year in 1982.

== Politics ==
In the 1960s, he served for eight years as a town councillor in Shawville, Quebec.

Prior to the 1987 Ontario general election, he won the Liberal nomination in the riding of Carleton, defeating Jim Colton, a Carleton Separate School Board trustee. He ran in the general election on an environmentalist platform, supporting cleaning up beaches and promoting recycling programs. On election day, he lost to Progressive Conservative Norm Sterling by fewer than 500 votes, in one of the closest elections in the riding's history.

Armitage was elected as mayor of West Carleton in the 1991 municipal election, defeating township councillor Keith Roe by over 2,200 votes. As mayor, he also sat on Ottawa–Carleton Regional council.

In 1994, Ottawa–Carleton Regional Council adopted a ward system and councillors would need to be directly elected rather than be made up from the various mayors and city councillors in the region. In the 1994 Ottawa-Carleton Regional Municipality elections, Armitage chose to run for a seat in Ward 5, which covered the region's western rural townships. He ended up losing to former Goulbourn mayor Betty Hill by just 75 votes. He ran on a platform of freezing taxes and phasing in the cost of regional policing in rural areas.

== Post politics ==
In 1999, he was named to the Canadian Horse Racing Hall of Fame. In 2005, he was awarded the Key to the City of Ottawa.

In 2011, the hall at the West Carleton community complex was renamed the Dr. Roland Armitage Hall. In 2019, he was named to the Order of Ottawa. In 2021, he was named to the Order of Ontario.

On June 19, 2024, Armitage died at the Perley Health Veterans Residence in Ottawa, where he had taken up residence in 2023. He was 99.

Preceded by Eric Craig	Mayors of West Carleton Township; 1991–1994	Succeeded by Dwight Eastman
