= 1982 Ottawa-Carleton Regional Municipality elections =

Elections were held on November 8, 1982 in the Regional Municipality of Ottawa-Carleton. This page lists the election results for local mayors and councils of the RMOC in 1982.

== Regional Council ==
The following were elected to regional council either directly on election day or by the local councils afterwards.

Position	Representing	Councillor
Chair	At-large	Andrew S. Haydon
Councillor	Mayor of Cumberland	Peter D. Clark
Councillor	Mayor of Gloucester	Fred Barrett
Councillor	Gloucester, Alderman	Harry Allen
Councillor	Gloucester, Alderman	Eugène Bellemare
Councillor	Mayor of Goulbourn	Anton Wytenburg
Councillor	Mayor of Kanata	Marianne Wilkinson
Councillor	Mayor of Nepean	Ben Franklin
Councillor	Nepean, Alderman	Gord Hunter
Councillor	Nepean, Alderman	Margaret Rywak
Councillor	Nepean, Alderman	Beryl Gaffney
Councillor	Mayor of Osgoode	Al Bouwers
Councillor	Mayor of Ottawa	Marion Dewar
Councillor	Ottawa, Councillor (Alta Vista)	Greg MacDougall
Councillor	Ottawa, Councillor (Billings)	Brian Bourns
Councillor	Ottawa, Councillor (Britannia)	Marlene Catterall
Councillor	Ottawa, Councillor (By-Rideau)	Marc Laviolette
Councillor	Ottawa, Councillor (Capital)	Howard Smith
Councillor	Ottawa, Councillor (Canterbury)	Michael McSweeney
Councillor	Ottawa, Councillor (Carleton)	Toddy Kehoe
Councillor	Ottawa, Councillor (Queensboro)	Terry Denison
Councillor	Ottawa, Councillor (Dalhousie)	Rolf Hasenack
Councillor	Ottawa, Councillor (Elmdale)	Graham Bird
Councillor	Ottawa, Councillor (Overbrook-Forbes)	Rhéal Robert
Councillor	Ottawa, Councillor (Richmond)	Jacquelin Holzman
Councillor	Ottawa, Councillor (Riverside)	Jim Durrell
Councillor	Ottawa, Councillor (St. George's)	Nancy Smith
Councillor	Ottawa, Councillor (Wellington)	Diane Holmes
Councillor	Mayor of Rideau	Dave Bartlett
Councillor	Mayor of Rockcliffe Park	Beryl Plumptre
Councillor	Mayor of Vanier	Bernard Grandmaître
Councillor	Vanier, Alderman	Marcel Chaput
Councillor	Mayor of West Carleton	Donald B. Munro

== Cumberland ==
Mayoral race

Candidate	Vote	%
Peter D. Clark (X)	3,939	62.68
Henri Rocque	2,345	37.32

Council
Four to be elected

Candidate	Vote	%
Ray Friel (X)	3,181	16.34
Gerry Lalonde	2,827	14.53
Paul Macdonnell	2,806	14.42
Brian Coburn (X)	2,573	13.22
Frank Kenny (X)	2,292	11.78
Paul Lavigne	2,074	10.66
Serge Desjardins	2,067	10.62
Ray Rivers	1,642	8.44

== Gloucester ==
Mayoral race

Candidate	Vote	%
Fred Barrett	7,308	37.58
Betty Stewart (X)	7,297	37.53
Daniel Prevost	2,780	14.30
Gordon Lundy	1,881	9.67
Ray Turmel	178	0.92

A recount showed that Stewart won 7,297 votes rather than 7,295 from election night.

Council
Six to be elected

Candidate	Vote	%
Harry Allen (X)	10,251	10.88
Eugène Bellemare (X)	9,144	9.70
Mitch Owens (X)	7,775	8.25
Ken Steele (X)	6,898	7.32
Harold Keenan (X)	6,711	7.12
Royal Galipeau	6,462	6.86
Patricia Clark	6,249	6.63
Claudette Cain	6,239	6.62
Mary Bryden (X)	6,129	6.50
Evelyn Grover	5,174	5.49
Robert Chenier	4,505	4.78
John Campbell	3,490	3.70
Jean Gregoire	3,248	3.45
Brad Kennedy	3,067	3.25
Michael O'Connor	2,769	2.94
Leola Davignon	2,664	2.83
John Leaker	1,400	1.49
John Turmel	1,193	1.27
Keith Sennett	864	0.92

Hydro Commission

- Two to be elected

Candidate	Vote	%
Robert Bisallion	Acclaimed	
Reg Morris	Acclaimed	

== Goulbourn ==
Mayoral race

Candidate	Vote	%
Anton Wytenburg	2,973	62.39
Betty Hill (X)	1,792	37.61

Council

Candidate	Vote	%
Ward 1
Ian MacDonald	495	50.51
Gilmour Brown (X)	485	49.49
Ward 2
Roger Griffiths	605	51.89
Doug Bothwell	561	48.11
Ward 3
Ken Vaughn	916	63.09
J. Don Green (X)	536	36.91
Ward 4
Mike Bryan	584	50.96
Dewar Burnett (X)	562	49.04

== Kanata ==
Mayoral race

Candidate	Vote	%
Marianne Wilkinson	Acclaimed	

Council

Candidate	Vote	%
Ward 1
Des Adam (X)	402	68.95
Gordon Walt	181	31.05
Ward 2
Sheila McKee	690	77.88
Bob Hillier	196	22.12
Ward 3
Bill Lund (X)	594	51.97
Ken Braun	549	48.03
Ward 4
Paul Niebergall	669	55.47
Glenn Guilbault	350	29.02
George St. Aubin	187	15.51
Ward 5
Charles Rogers (X)	588	53.31
Doug Felhaber	515	46.69
Ward 6
Eva James	681	48.57
Stu Chandler	443	31.60
Tony McMillan	278	19.83

== Nepean ==
Mayoral race (259 of 260 polls)

Candidate	Vote	%
Ben Franklin (X)	20,824	93.64
Savitri Bhartia	1,415	6.36

Council

Candidate	Vote	%
Regional council 3 to be elected
Margaret Rywak (X)	11,566	20.28
Gordon Hunter (X)	10,960	19.22
Beryl Gaffney (X)	10,180	17.85
Al Loney	10,045	17.62
James Sevigny	6,432	11.28
Tim Woods	6,010	10.54
Art Jenkinson	1,829	3.21
Bell-Barrhaven Ward
Frank Reid (X)	3,066	51.80
Marcy Gregory	1,646	27.81
Victoria Mason	1,207	20.39
Borden Ward
Al Brown (X)	4,890	77.88
Richard Priestman	1,389	22.12
Merivale Ward
Hugh McDonald	Acclaimed	

Hydro Commission

- Four to be elected

Candidate	Vote	%
Martin Montague (X)	13,918	22.19
Wayne Phillips (X)	13,292	21.19
Ed Lauer (X)	12,784	20.38
Merv Sullivan (X)	11,866	18.92
Lloyd Hayes	10,872	17.33

== Osgoode ==
Mayoral race

Candidate	Vote	%
Albert Bouwers (X)	2,164	62.56
Barry Dawson	563	16.28
Philip McEvoy	491	14.19
Jim Pushinksy	241	6.97

Council Four elected at large. Elected councillors indicated in bold.

Candidate	Vote	%
**Doug Thompson** (X)	2,171	21.66
**Mary Cooper** (X)	2,163	21.58
**Albert McKeown** (X)	2,033	20.28
**Fred Alexander** (X)	2,025	20.20
Eric Bawden	1,631	16.27

== Ottawa ==
Mayor race

Candidate	Votes	%
Marion Dewar (X)	57,268	52.06
Darrel Kent	48,461	44.06
T. Joseph McCarthy	2,060	1.87
Marc Gauvin	1,725	1.57
Arnold Guetta	487	0.44

== Rideau ==
Mayoral race

Candidate	Vote	%
Dave Bartlett	Acclaimed	

Council

Candidate	Vote	%
**Ward 1**; 2 to be elected
**Bill Schouten**	Acclaimed	
**Glenn Brooks**	Acclaimed	
**Ward 2**; 2 to be elected
**Jim Stewart**	420	25.16
**Bryan Dorling**	410	24.57
Bill Wilson	361	21.63
Don Carr	243	14.56
Harry Whittaker	235	14.08
**Ward 3**; 2 to be elected
**Richard McDonald** (X)	Acclaimed	
**Mike Calnan** (X)	Acclaimed	

== Rockcliffe Park ==
There was no election held in Rockcliffe Park, as all candidates were acclaimed.

Mayor race

Candidate	Vote	%
**Beryl Plumptre**	Acclaimed	

Council
4 to be elected

Candidate	Vote	%
**John Richard**	Acclaimed	
**Patrick Murray**	Acclaimed	
**Alexander Watson**	Acclaimed	
**Shelagh M'Gonigle**	Acclaimed	

== Vanier ==
Mayoral race

Candidate	Vote	%
Bernard Grandmaître	3,822	52.19
Wilfrid Champagne (X)	3,262	44.54
Blanche Michaud	239	3.26

Council

Candidate	Vote	%
**Ward 1**; 2 to be elected
**Pierre Crête**	719	31.58
**Paul St. George**	524	23.01
Marcel Champagne (X)	512	22.49
Richard Boudreau (X)	445	19.54
Manuel Sousa	77	3.38
**Ward 2**; 2 to be elected
**Marcel Chaput** (X)	1,341	30.26
**Ronald Killeen** (X)	1,079	24.35
Gilles Guenette	1,023	23.08
Charles Morin	989	22.31
**Ward 3**; 2 to be elected
**Roger Parisien**	746	23.35
**Jean-Jacques Gratton**	615	20.90
Robert Madore (X)	506	17.19
Gilles Barbary (X)	435	14.78
Denis Grandmaître	492	16.72
Charles Bériault	149	5.06
**Ward 4**; 2 to be elected
**Guy Cousineau**	Acclaimed	
**Florian Gauthier**	Acclaimed	

== West Carleton ==
Mayoral race

Candidate	Vote	%
Don Munro	2,622	51.23
Frank Marchington (X)	2,496	48.77

Council

Candidate	Vote	%
**Ward 1**; 2 to be elected
**John Shipman**	1,049	41.12
**Delmer Wilson** (X)	858	33.63
Thomas Boland	644	25.25
**Ward 2**; 2 to be elected
**Eric Craig**	1,129	38.26
**Robert Dowd**	1,084	36.73
Stephen Bunge	419	14.20
John McMurtry	319	10.81
**Ward 3**; 2 to be elected
**Gerald Belisle** (X)	1,130	35.22
**Keith Roe**	842	26.25
Lynda Dodunski	702	21.88
Elke Kazda	534	16.65

== Sources ==
- Ottawa Citizen, November 9, 1982
