= 1991 Ottawa-Carleton Regional Municipality elections =

1991 Canadian Municipal Election

1991 Ottawa-Carleton Regional chair election
- November 12, 1991
Nominee	Peter D. Clark	Frank Reid	Darrel Kent
Popular vote	58,840	57,164	54,659
Percentage	29.83%	28.98%	27.71%
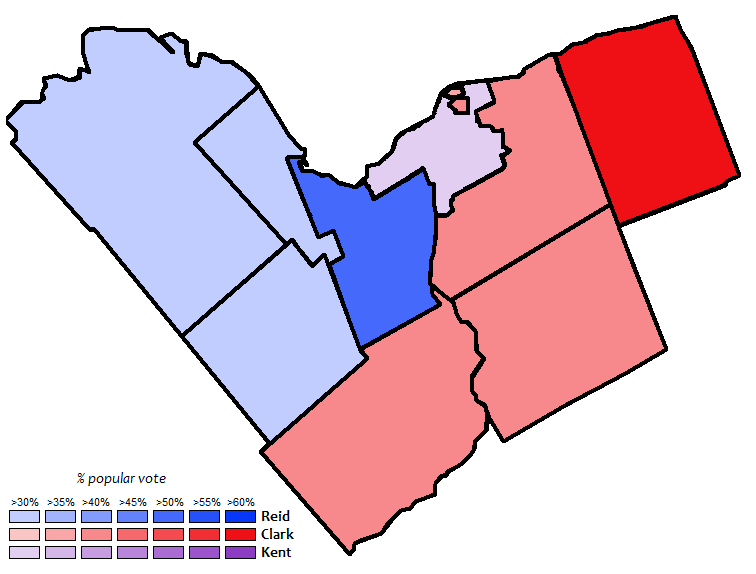
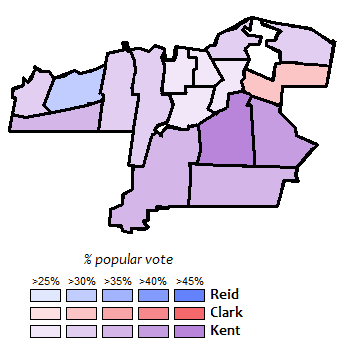
Chair before election
Andy Haydon
Elected Chair
Peter D. Clark

Elections were held on November 12, 1991 in the Regional Municipality of Ottawa-Carleton. This page lists the election results for Regional Chair, local mayors and councils of the RMOC in 1991. The 1991 election was the first direct election for a regional chair of the board.

== Regional Chair of Ottawa-Carleton ==
Candidate	Vote	%
Peter Clark	58,840	29.83
Frank Reid	57,164	28.98
Darrel Kent	54,659	27.71
Victoria Mason	14,244	7.22
Chris Jalkotzy	4,730	2.40
John Turmel	3,570	1.81
Michael K. B. Hahn	2,366	1.20
Dale Edwin Alkerton	1,680	0.85

== Regional Council ==
The Ottawa-Carleton Regional Council was made up of 33 various elected positions across the region.

Position	Representing	Councillor
Chair	At-large	Peter Clark
Councillor	Mayor of Cumberland	Brian Coburn
Councillor	Mayor of Gloucester	Claudette Cain
Councillor	Gloucester, Councillor	Richard Cantin
Councillor	Gloucester, Councillor	Fiona Faucher
Councillor	Mayor of Goulbourn	Paul Bradley
Councillor	Mayor of Kanata	Merle Nicholds
Councillor	Mayor of Nepean	Ben Franklin
Councillor	Nepean, Councillor	Gord Hunter
Councillor	Nepean, Councillor	Al Loney
Councillor	Nepean, Councillor	David Pratt
Councillor	Mayor of Osgoode	Al Bouwers
Councillor	Mayor of Ottawa	Jacquelin Holzman
Councillor	Ottawa, Councillor (Alta Vista)	Peter Hume
Councillor	Ottawa, Councillor (Billings)	Joan O'Neill
Councillor	Ottawa, Councillor (Britannia)	Jill Brown
Councillor	Ottawa, Councillor (By-Rideau)	Richard Cannings
Councillor	Ottawa, Councillor (Capital)	Jim Watson
Councillor	Ottawa, Councillor (Canterbury)	Jack MacKinnon
Councillor	Ottawa, Councillor (Carleton)	Tim Kehoe
Councillor	Ottawa, Councillor (Carlington-Westboro)	Mark Maloney
Councillor	Ottawa, Councillor (Dalhousie)	Peter Harris
Councillor	Ottawa, Councillor (Elmdale)	Joan Wong
Councillor	Ottawa, Councillor (Overbrook-Forbes)	Jacques Legendre
Councillor	Ottawa, Councillor (Richmond)	Alex Cullen
Councillor	Ottawa, Councillor (Riverside)	George Brown
Councillor	Ottawa, Councillor (St. George's)	Nancy Mitchell
Councillor	Ottawa, Councillor (Wellington)	Diane Holmes
Councillor	Mayor of Rideau	James C. Stewart
Councillor	Mayor of Rockcliffe Park	Patrick J. Murray
Councillor	Mayor of Vanier	Guy Cousineau
Councillor	Vanier, Councillor (chosen from council)	Madeleine Meilleur
Councillor	Mayor of West Carleton	Roland Armitage

== Cumberland ==
Mayoral race

Candidate	Vote	%
Brian Coburn (X)	7,933	64.83
Bob Monette	4,304	35.17

Council

Candidate	Vote	%
Bilberry Ward
David Lewis	1,101	65.07
Frank Dugal	591	34.93
Fallingbrook Ward
Fernande Casey	1,123	46.79
Richard Lewis	807	33.63
Arnold Stirajs	470	19.58
Heights Ward
Frank Stacey	2,197	87.92
Youssef Masour	302	12.08
Heritage Ward; 2 to be elected
Gerry Lalonde (X)	2,162	32.75
Robert van den Ham	1,726	26.14
Michel Marleau	1,261	19.10
Rae Lowe	789	11.95
Richard J. Geitz	664	10.06
Villages Ward
Keith DeCruz	758	52.35
Maureen Brasset	690	47.65

== Gloucester ==
Mayoral race

Candidate	Vote	%
Claudette Cain	14,814	52.39
Harry Allen (X)	9,892	34.98
Henry Baier	3,573	12.63

Council

Candidate	Vote	%
Regional council 2 to be elected
Richard Cantin	13,472	29.83
Fiona Faucher	11,665	25.83
Michael Denny	10,200	22.58
Harold Keenan	9,831	21.77
Gloucester North Ward
Mary Bryden	2,603	43.35
Jean-Francois Milotte	1,485	24.73
Jeff Slater	1,481	24.67
Leonard Fortin	435	7.25
Cyrville Ward
Patricia Clark	1,579	58.14
Keith Findley	571	21.02
Joe Saab	566	20.84
Blackburn Hamlet Ward
Edward Campbell	1,372	39.38
Jim Campbell	979	28.10
Rainer Bloess	610	17.51
Edmée Torner-Ngoh	523	15.01
Orleans North Ward
René Danis	2,358	47.76
Sallie Hunter	1,401	28.38
Ken Vowles	898	18.19
Brad Kennedy	280	5.67
Orleans South Ward
Frank Cauley	2,927	60.30
Vincent Kiraly	1,927	39.70
Gloucester South Ward
Daniel Beamish	2,947	59.90
Joanne Bomben	695	14.13
Paul Gauthier	674	13.70
George Saade	604	12.28

== Goulbourn ==
Mayoral race

Candidate	Vote	%
Paul Bradley	3,030	44.60
Anton Wytenburg (X)	2,438	35.89
Ian MacDonald	1,325	19.51

Council

Candidate	Vote	%
Ward 1
Mac Drummond	250	44.33
Perce McKinnley (X)	206	36.52
Don Attfield	108	19.15
Ward 2 (2 to be elected)
Wayne Beaten (X)	2,099	36.36
Leslie Haubrich	1,156	20.02
Allan Ryan	997	17.27
Keldine Fitzgerald	791	13.70
Tom Toomey	730	12.65
Ward 3
Bob Miller	610	43.32
Hank Helleman	552	39.20
Peter Sturrus	246	17.47
Ward 4
Ron Mahar (X)	647	49.77
Bill Simpson	608	46.77
Bill Foster	45	3.46

== Kanata ==
Mayoral race

Candidate	Vote	%
Merle Nicholds	6,229	50.43
Des Adam (X)	6,122	49.57

Council

Candidate	Vote	%
Beaverbrook Ward
Marianne Wilkinson	957	46.23
Bob Hillary (X)	681	32.90
Ian Cumming	218	10.53
Clayton J. Hemond	214	10.34
Bridlewood Ward
Eva James	1,455	70.84
Yolande Adams	599	29.16
Glen Cairn Ward
Pam Cripps	1,018	37.43
Doug Felhabler (X)	1,017	37.39
Doug Parsons	540	19.85
Lionel King	145	5.33
Katimavik-Hazeldean Ward
Alex Munter	2,466	71.42
Bev Read (X)	565	16.36
Derek Foster	422	12.22
March Rural Ward
Sheila Elizabeth McKee	350	43.59
Bill Berry (X)	321	39.98
Cecil Lyon	132	16.44
North Kanata Ward
Mark Gallivan	530	54.98
Terry O'Neill	230	23.86
Neil Staker	204	21.16

== Nepean ==
Mayoral race

Candidate	Vote	%
Ben Franklin (X)	24,566	89.32
Christine Chevalier	2,936	10.68

Council

Candidate	Vote	%
Regional council 3 to be elected
Gord Hunter (X)	16,105	24.43
Al Loney (X)	16,009	24.29
David Pratt (X)	14,947	22.68
Rick Chiarelli	14,592	22.14
Curt Neilson	4,262	6.47
Bell-Barrhaven Ward
Doug Collins	4,146	43.89
Patricia Pepper	2,618	27.71
Tom O'Neill	2,163	22.90
Ken Toews	520	5.50
Borden Ward
Shayna Shuster	3,686	44.75
Marion Mayman	3,272	39.73
Don Fox	1,278	15.52
Merivale Ward
Les Casey (X)	4,154	48.26
Cathy Boswell	3,294	38.27
Hal Lee	1,159	13.47

== Osgoode ==
Mayoral race

Candidate	Vote	%
Al Bouwers (X)	3,124	62.82
Ron Stanley	1,849	37.18

Council Four elected at large. Elected councillors indicated in bold.

Candidate	Vote	%
**Doug Thompson** (X)	2,602	16.02
**Albert McKeown** (X)	2,477	15.25
**Lloyd Cranston** (X)	2,421	14.90
**Vera Mitchell**	2,223	13.69
Robert Ramsay	1,941	11.95
Martin Rowan	1,627	10.02
Terrance Otto	1,541	9.49
Ken Pettigrew	1,411	8.69

== Ottawa ==
Mayoral race

Candidate	Votes	%
Jacquelin Holzman	38,725	39.61
Nancy Smith	35,525	36.34
Marc Laviolette (X)	21,101	21.58
Michael Bartholomew	2,417	2.47

== Rideau ==
Mayoral race

Candidate	Vote	%
James C. Stewart	2,292	48.27
Bryan Dorling	1,981	41.72
Ron Watson	475	10.00

Council

Candidate	Vote	%
**Ward 1**; 2 to be elected
**Don Stephenson**	626	25.01
**Glenn Brooks**	547	21.85
George Hawkins	543	21.69
Bill Schoulten (X)	471	18.82
Sandra Thornton-Chown	226	9.03
Heinz Bloess	90	3.60
**Ward 2**; 2 to be elected
**Chuck Parent**	524	19.07
**Bev Rowan** (X)	345	12.55
Gord Angus	342	12.45
Gord Hawkes	333	12.12
Wendy Braid	325	11.83
Kathryn Holman	276	10.04
Lawrence Wyatt	272	9.90
George Lobay	266	9.68
Rick Story	65	2.37
**Ward 3**; 2 to be elected
**Anne Robinson**	1,272	38.98
**Rich McDonald** (X)	830	25.44
Bob Saxberg	598	18.33
Mike Calnan (X)	563	17.25

== Rockcliffe Park ==
Mayoral race

Candidate	Vote	%
Patrick J. Murray (X)	548	62.41
Warren Langford	330	37.59

Council Four elected at large. Elected councillors indicated in bold.

Candidate	Vote	%
**Sandy Smallwood**	555	18.73
**Bill Stewart** (X)	550	18.56
**Sheila Nelles** (X)	546	18.43
**Marianne Feaver Esdaile**	542	18.29
Jeffrey Weatherill	319	10.77
Melody Wirth	244	8.23
Norma Young-MacLean	207	6.99

== Vanier ==
Mayoral race

Candidate	Vote	%
Guy Cousineau	2,447	42.31
Leo Lavergne	1,976	34.17
Marc Grandmaître	1,360	23.52

Council

Candidate	Vote	%
**Cummings Ward**; 2 to be elected
**Diane Doré**	1,077	33.06
**Paul St. Georges**	700	21.49
Denis Perrault	559	17.16
George Azzi	537	16.48
Roger Vachon	292	8.96
Robert St. Laurent	93	2.85
**William D'Aoust Ward**; 2 to be elected
**Madeleine Meilleur**	878	34.65
**Robert Madore** (X)	658	25.97
Michael Brennan	266	10.50
Maurice Constantinean	213	8.41
Jim Landriault	194	7.66
Ted Proulx	188	7.42
Lucien Lavoie	137	5.41
**Richelieu Ward**; 2 to be elected
**Denis Grandmaître** (X)	1,075	40.02
**Yvon Dubé**	889	33.10
Marcel Prevost (X)	722	26.88

== West Carleton ==
Mayoral race

Candidate	Vote	%
Roland Armitage	4,093	59.23
Keith Roe	1,819	30.77

Council

Candidate	Vote	%
**Torbolton Ward**; 2 to be elected
**Sue Lebrun** (X)	1,209	37.18
**Dan MacMillan**	1,184	36.41
John Reid	859	26.41
**Fitzroy Ward**; 2 to be elected
**Ebert Reitsma** (X)	1,049	37.08
**Dwight Eastman**	976	34.50
Jim Colton	490	17.32
Phil Reilly	314	11.10
**Huntley Ward**; 2 to be elected
**John Caldwell**	1,273	37.67
**Orville Kemp** (X)	1,008	29.83
Gary Marshall	842	24.92
Barbara Jean Mollon	256	7.58

== Sources ==
- Ottawa Citizen, November 14, 1991, pg B2
