= Galetta =

Dispersed rural community in Canada

Coordinates: 45°25′30″N 76°15′20″W

- Dispersed rural community
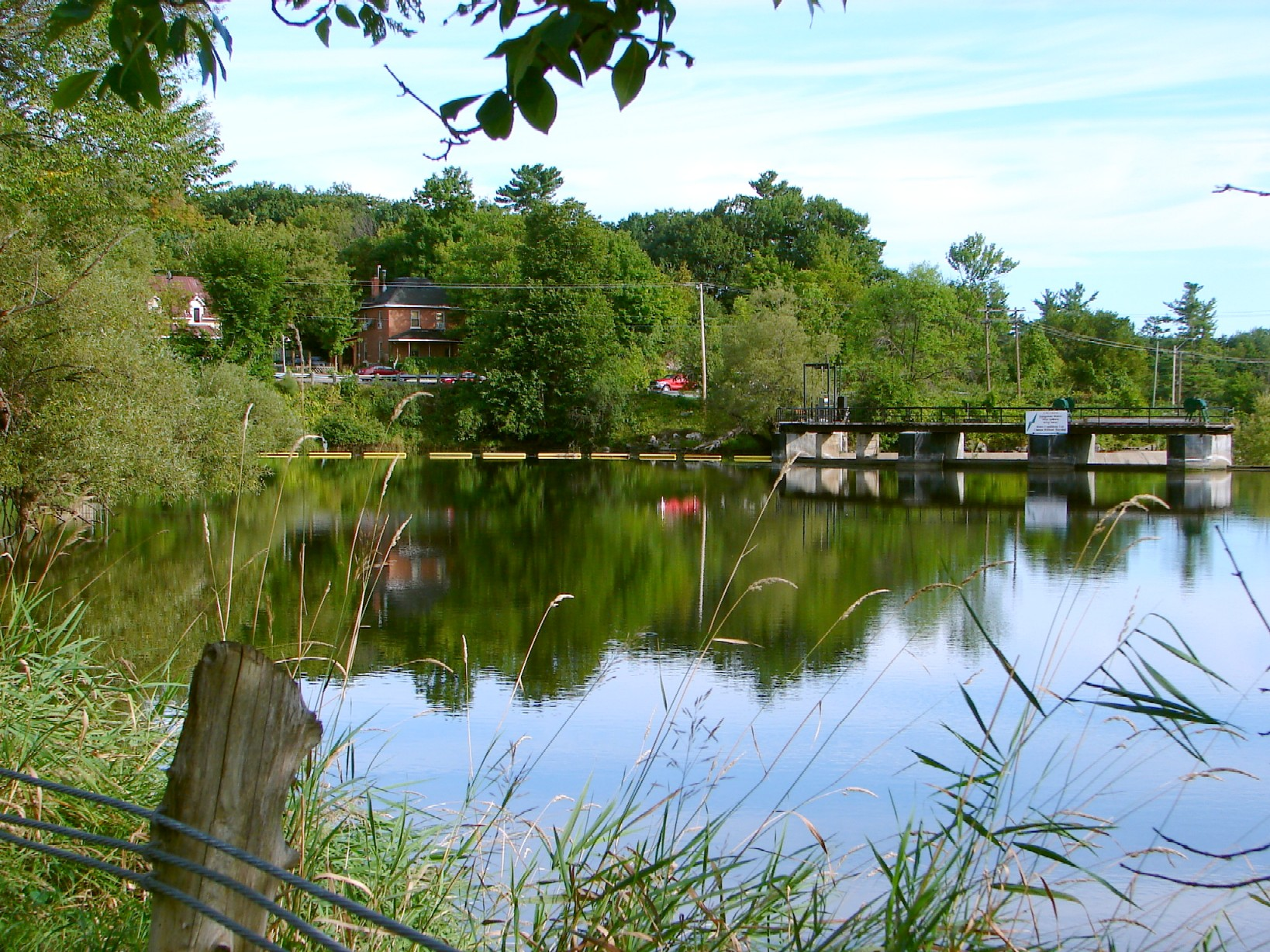
- Galetta and the Mississippi River
- Interactive map of Galetta
- Country: Canada
- Province: Ontario
- City: Ottawa
- Settled: 1823
- Post office: 1850

Government
  - MPs: Jenna Sudds
  - MPPs: Karen McCrimmon
  - Councillors: Clarke Kelly

Population (2021)
  - Total: 556
- Canada 2021 Census
- Time zone: UTC-5 (Eastern (EST))
- Postal Code FSA: K7S, K0A
- Area code: (613)

Galetta is a dispersed rural community in West Carleton-March Ward in rural eastern Ottawa, Ontario, Canada. It is located on the Mississippi River near its mouth in the Ottawa River. Once part of Fitzroy Township and later West Carleton, it is now part of the city of Ottawa.

According to the Canada 2021 Census, the population of Galetta's Dissemination Area was 556, which also includes nearby communities Vydon Acres, Marshall Bay and part of Mohr Corners.

== History ==
The area was first settled in 1823. It was originally named Hubbell's Falls after James Hubbell.

The Post Office was established in 1850, and was kept at Riddle's or Mohr's Corners, James Riddle served as postmaster in 1866. By 1866, Hubbell's Falls was a village with a population of about 200 in the township of Fitzroy, on the Mississippi river. The river here has a fall of twenty feet. It contained a school, with an average attendance of forty.five pupils.

It was renamed Steen's Falls after James Steen who built a mill here, and finally Galetta in 1873 after James Galetti Whyte who also built mills on the river here.

In 1892, the Ottawa, Arnprior and Parry Sound Railway built a line through the town, which later became a branch line on the Canadian National Railway. Since 1974, use has been limited.

A small hydroelectric plant on the Mississippi River is in Galetta, operational since 1907, now the property of TransAlta.
