= Eli El-Chantiry =

Lebanese-Canadian politician

Deputy Mayor of Ottawa Serving with Steve Desroches
- In office December 2010 – December 2014
- Succeeded by: Bob Monette, Mark Taylor

Ottawa City Councillor
- In office December 1, 2003 – November 15, 2022
- Preceded by: Dwight Eastman
- Succeeded by: Clarke Kelly
- Constituency: West Carleton-March Ward

Personal details
- Born: April 23, 1957 (age 69) Kab-Elias, Lebanon
- Party: Liberal
- Spouse: Maha

Eli El-Chantiry (born April 23, 1957 in Kab-Elias, Lebanon) is a former Canadian politician. He was an Ottawa City Councillor from 2003 to 2022 and served as chair of the Ottawa Police Services Board.

He was born in Lebanon and moved to Canada with his family at age eighteen. After attending the University of Ottawa, he became a businessman, owning the Lighthouse Restaurant in Constance Bay in West Carleton.

El-Chantiry ran for city council in the 2003 Ottawa election to replace retiring Dwight Eastman. He won, defeating retired schoolteacher Adele Muldoon by 29 votes.

After the 13 June 2007 decision by Ottawa Mayor Larry O'Brien to resign as Chair of the Ottawa Police Services Board, El-Chantiry was nominated as the board's new leader, an appointment to be confirmed later in June 2007.

Following a public complaint on Eli El-Chantiry's 2014 campaign spending, his financials are audited. The audit firm found a “clerical” error in his expense filings and a problem with the accounting of his nomination fee refund. Also, there was a question of Eli El-Chantiry not accounting for reused campaign signs in 2014, but the auditor couldn't determine a value for the signs. The committee let him off the hook.

Again, embattled and at the centre of several police services gaffes over the years, Ottawa Police Association president Matt Skof publicly demanded El-Chantiry's resignation in March 2016.

In the 2018 Mayoral campaign, Eli El-Chantiry endorsed Jim Watson for mayor in the 2018 Ottawa municipal election.

Later in July 2018, in a recorded conversations between Ottawa Police Association president, Matt Skof, and an anonymous source, it was alleged Eli El-Chantiry was the target of an undercover bribery sting. OPP investigate recordings about Ottawa police board chair

As Chair of the Ottawa Police Services Board, in June 2018, Eli El-Chantiry announces the selection of Uday Jaswal, formerly of Durham Police Services, as Deputy Chief for Ottawa Police Services, "Coun. Eli El-Chantiry, chair of the Ottawa Police Services Board, said Jaswal beat out four other competitors, who were shortlisted for the job as part of a country-wide search."[Jaswal] met all the criteria," said El-Chantiry. "He's a young, innovative thinker. He's educated, bilingual."

In October 2018, El-Chantiry is voted in for the fifth time as councillor for Ward 5.

El-Chantiry ceased to be a member or chair of the Ottawa Police Services Board in January 2019, being beat out by the first ever female police services board Chair.

On February 16, 2022, El-Chantiry became chair of the Ottawa Police Services Board in the midst of historic civil unrest in the city as a result of the Freedom Convoy 2022. City council voted to overhaul the police board and remove chair Diane Deans as a result of the handling of policing of the Canada convoy protest in Ottawa which began in late January 2022.
