= Dunrobin, Ontario =

Dunrobin
- Unincorporated community
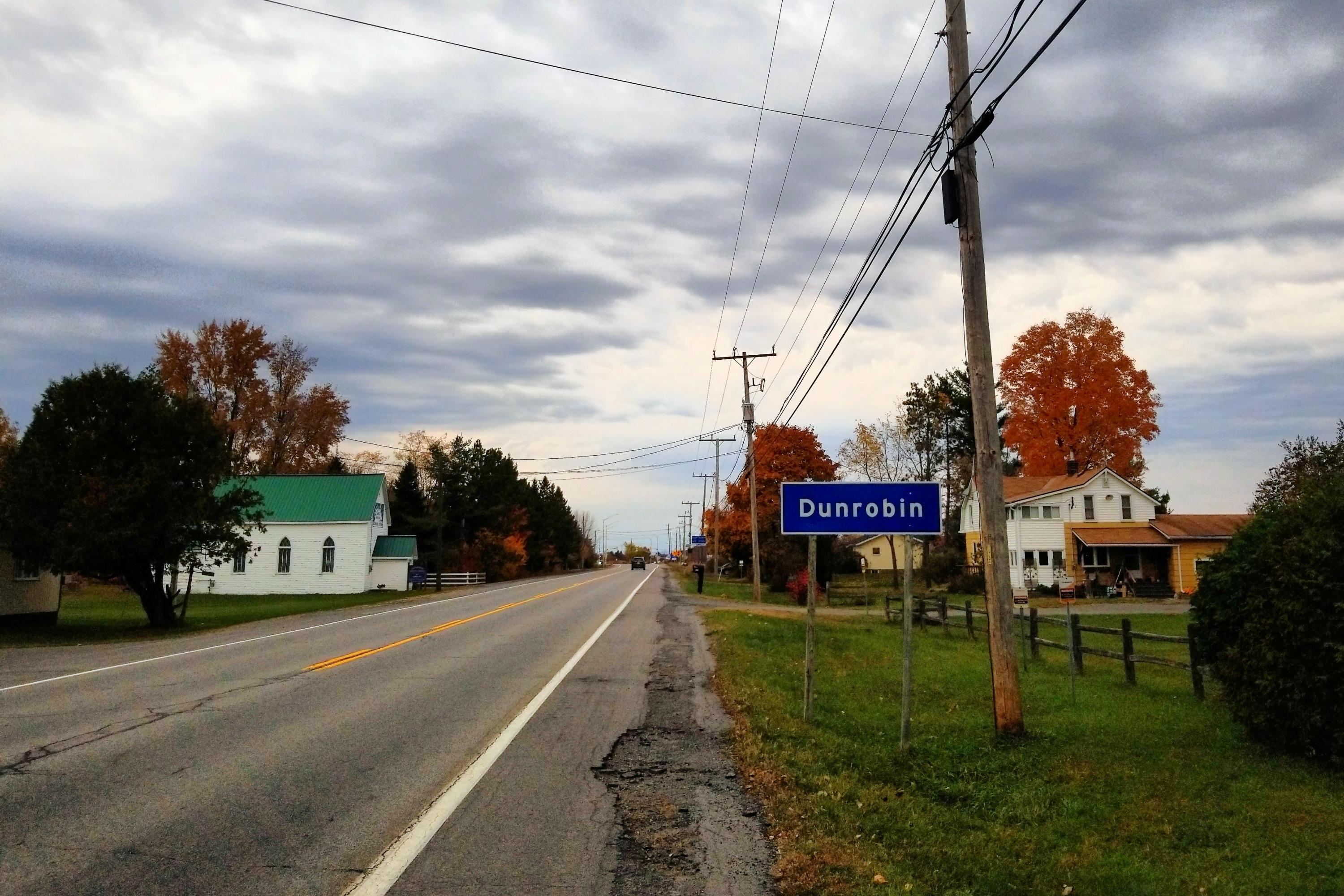

- Location within Ottawa Location within Southern Ontario
- Coordinates: 45°25′17″N 76°01′12″W
- Country: Canada
- Province: Ontario
- Municipality: Ottawa
- Ward: West Carleton-March Ward
- Time zone: UTC-5 (EST)
  - Summer (DST): UTC-4 (EDT)
- Postal code: K0A 1T0
- Area code: 613

Dunrobin is a community in West Carleton-March Ward in the City of Ottawa, Ontario, Canada. It is located about 35 kilometres (22 mi) northwest of Downtown Ottawa. Dunrobin lies within a valley, nestled between the Ottawa River and the Carp escarpment. It is located on the former boundary between West Carleton Township and Kanata (formerly March Township). Dunrobin was amalgamated with the city of Ottawa in 2000. Dunrobin is expanding steadily with a current population of about 1,000 people.

The Dunrobin Community Association defines the community boundaries as Murphy Sideroad, Constance Lake Road and Berry Sideroad on the south, the Ottawa River to the east, a line following Limestone Road to Kinburn Sideroad to Stonecrest Road to Thomas A. Dolan Parkway to Marchhurst Road on the west, and on the north by a line following Kilmaurs Sideroad to Woodkilton Road to Kinburn Sideroad to Constance Creek.

Dunrobin was settled in the 19th century at the corner of Dunrobin Road and Thomas A. Dolan Parkway. The town centre comprises a community centre with outdoor recreation facilities and a number of small businesses. While originally started as an agricultural community it now serves mostly as the hub of a larger community that has a mixed population of farmers, commuters who work in Kanata and Ottawa-Gatineau, cottagers, and pensioners. Some nearby points of interest include Pinhey's Point, Fitzroy Provincial Park, Constance Bay, and the Diefenbunker museum.

Dunrobin took its name from Dunrobin Castle near Golspie, Scotland.

On September 21, 2018, a high-end EF3 tornado struck the community, damaging or destroying 60 buildings and seriously injuring three people.
