= Charles Shirreff =

Charles Shirreff may refer to:

- Charles Shirreff (painter) (c. 1750–1829), Scottish painter
- Charles Shirreff (businessman) (1768–1847), Pre-confederation Canadian businessman
