= Joseph Lebbos =

Lebanese writer

Joseph Labbos
- جوزف لبس
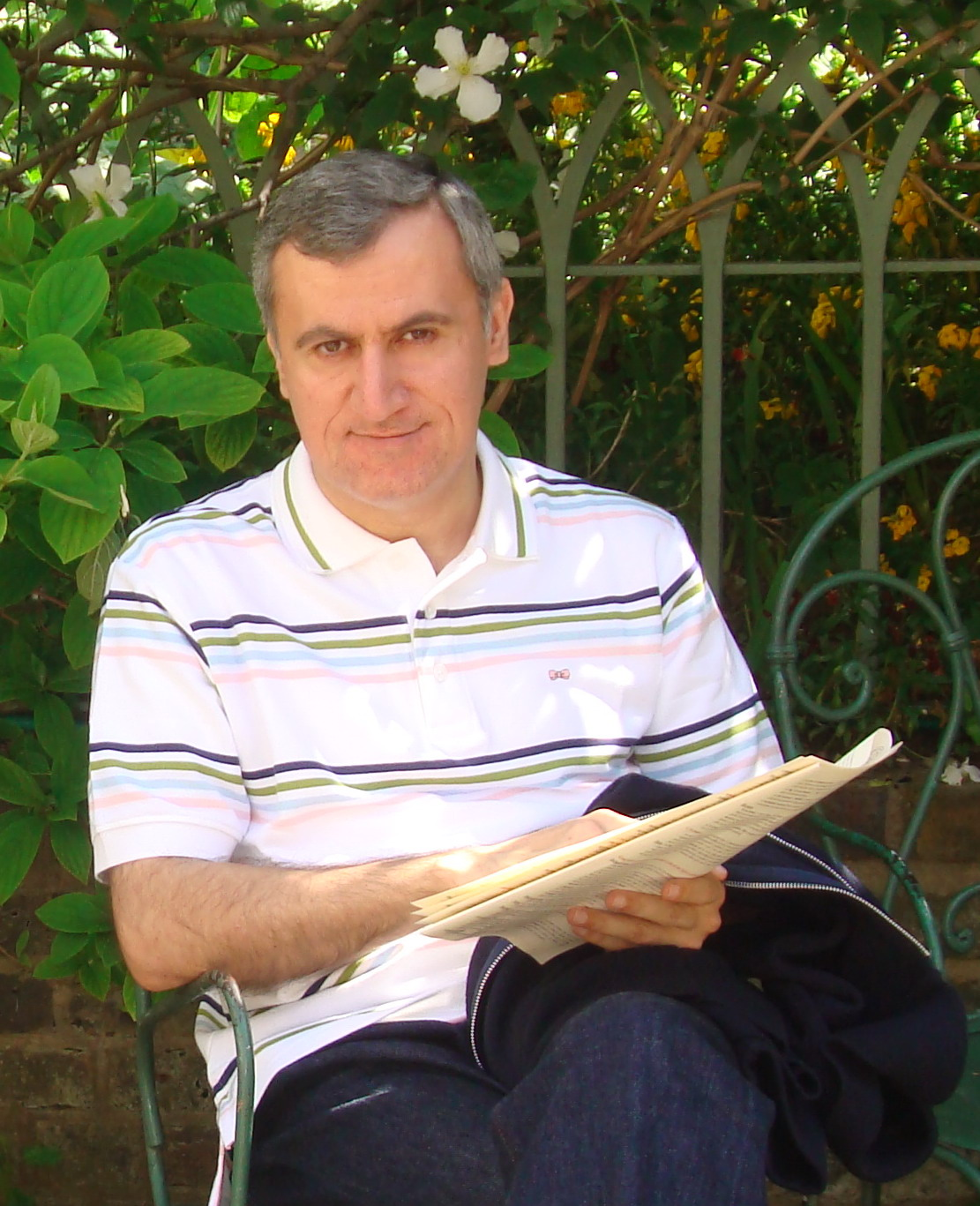
- Born: 1966 (age 59–60); Beirut
- Education: doctorate in Arabic language and literature
- Alma mater: Lebanese University
- Title: writer, researcher, lecturer

Joseph Labbos (Arabic: جوزف لبس) was a writer, researcher, and a lecturer at the Lebanese University and Saint Joseph University. He writes about travel literature, biography and the history of religions.

== Scientific biography ==
He was born in 1966 in Saifi (Beirut) in a Lebanese family. He grew up in Qabb Ilyas in the Beqaa Valley, in the east of Lebanon. When he was two years old he was educated at "Sayidat Alrusul School". He continued his high school studies at the Qabb Ilyas official high school, until he graduated in the major of Arabic language and literature from the Lebanese University, the fourth branch, in 1989. In 1994 he obtained his Diploma degree in postgraduate studies from the second branch, majoring in children's literature. In 2003 he obtained a doctorate degree in Arabic language and literature from the Lebanese University, specializing in Renaissance literature, after he submitted his thesis "Love and death from the perspective of the biography between Egypt and Lebanon" under the supervision of Dr. Antoine Maalouf, he got 17 out of 20 and was rated very well. Then he graduated and became an assistant professor in the Faculty of Arts and Human Sciences at the Lebanese University in 2013, and a professor in 2017.

His name was mentioned in the Dictionary of Christian Arab Authors from before Islam until the end of the twentieth century (Beirut, Dar Al-Mashriq, 1st Edition, 2018), Vol. 9, pp. 12–13.

== Works ==
1. "Word sculpture – alabaster texts." (original text: alnaht bialkalimat – nsws min almaramar) Dar Al-Banan, Deir Al-Zahrani, 2020 (with twenty-five colored sculptures) [128 pages].
2. "Chisel and Pen – Dialogue of Sculpture and Literature." (original text: al'iizmil walqalam – hiwar alnaht wal'adb.) Dar Al-Banan, Deir Al-Zahrani, 2020 (with thirty colored sculptures) [136 pages].
3. "The Roman Notebook – Diary of a Journey to the Eternal City." (original text: almfkkr alrwmanya – ywmyat rihlatan 'iilaa almadina alkhalida) Dar Al-Mashreq, 2020 (with eighteen color pictures) [96 pages].
4. "Nightingale's Third Hymn – Dialogue of Word and Color." (original text: tarnimat aleindalib alththalitha – hiwar alkalimat walluwn) Beirut, House of Time Leaves, 2018 (with fifty colorful paintings) [136 pages].
5. "Single chord splits – when we see, read and write." (original text: taqasim ealaa watr munfarid – hin naraa wanaqra wanuktib.) Dar Al-Banan, Deir Al-Zahrani, 2015 (with fifty colorful paintings) [136 pages].
6. "Rain from flowers – A study in the duality of religion, art, and selected texts." (original text: mtr min warad – dirasat fi thnayyt aldiyn walfn wanusus mukhtara) Dar Al-Mashreq, Beirut, 2012 (with thirty pictures in color) [200 pages].
7. "The Parisian Diary – Views and Reflections on Travel Literature." (original text: almfkira albarysya – mashahid wtammlat fi 'adab alrahalat.) Dar Al-Banan, Deir Al-Zahrani, 2012 (with eighty-five color photographs) [167 pages]
8. "Informatics, language, literature and civilization – number and letter." (original text: almaelumatiat wallagha wal'adb walhadarat – alraqm walharf.) The Modern Book Foundation, Tripoli, 2012 [224 pages].
9. "Hour glass and diamonds – texts of beacons in the history of reading." (original text: saea rmlya wa'almas – nsws manarat fi tarikh alqara'at) Arab Renaissance House (Beirut), 2011 [300 pages].
10. "If the paintings spoke – Readings." (original text: lawhat 'iin hakat – qaraa'at fi lawhat alqara'at.) Dar Al-Banan, Deir Al-Zahrani, 2011; 2nd Edition, 2017 (with fifty colorful artboards) [128 pages].
11. "Brother's book – diaries and memories." (original text: kitab 'akhi – mdhkirat wadhikriaat) North & North Press, Beirut, 2009 (deluxe edition) [143 pages].
12. "Love and death from the perspective of the biography between Egypt and Lebanon in the literature of Taha Hussein, Tawfiq al-Hakim, Aisha Abdel-Rahman, Mikhail Naimy, Tawfiq Youssef Awad, and Leila Osseiran." (original text: alhub walmawt min man'dur alsiyra aldhatya bayn misr walubnan) It is a doctoral thesis published by Dar Al-Mashreq as a book in Beirut, 2009. It was nominated by the publisher of the Italian "Mediterranean Prize for Writers" (Premio Mediterraneo del Libro) granted by the Mediterranean Foundation, Naples [479 pages].
13. "Animal stories in children's literature" (original text: qasas alhayawan fi 'adab al'atfal) (last quarter of the twentieth century). It is a university thesis supervised by d. George Zaki Al-Hajj, published by the book Al-Ahlia for Publishing and Distribution, Beirut, 1996 [131 pages]
14. "Golden apples in baskets of silver." (original text: tufah min dhahab fi salal min fida.) It is a literary group in 166 topics with indexes, published by the Nofal Foundation, Beirut, 1996. (Second edition, Arab Science House, Beirut, 2008; 3rd Edition, Dar Al-Banan, 2019) [560 pages]

== Research and articles ==
1. "Reading in the Will of a National Intellectual – Lebanon in the Washington and Tel Aviv Mobilization by Dr. Antoine Maalouf" (original text: "qra'at fi wsyt mthqqf wtny – lubnan fi mahb washintun wtl 'abib lilduktur 'antuan maelwf")(University Studies in Arts and Humanities, Part One, June 2020), pp. 94–102.
2. "A Religion from Water – Rain in the Canaanite Religion" (original text: "dyanat min maa' – almatar fi aldiyanat alkneany") (Al-Mashriq, Year 93, Part Two, July–December 2019), pp. 385–402.
3. "Formation of the Student Researcher or the Truth of the Trigger" (original text: "tkwin altaalib albahith 'aw qdh alzand") (Al-Mashreq, Year 93, Part One, January – June 2019), pp. 11–24.
4. "The Role of Social Media in the Fourth of Language" (original text: "dwr wasayit altawasul alajtmaey fi rabue allgh") (Al-Mashreq, Year 91, Part Two, July–December 2017), pp. 427–436.
5. "Rain and Purple or Religion and Art in the Canaanite Civilization" (original text: "almtar wal'arjuan 'aw aldiyn walfn fi alhadarat alkaneany") (Al-Mashriq, Year 91, Part One, January–June 2017), pp. 141–165.
6. "Hour glass and Diamonds – In the Report of the Ego Reading" (original text: "saeat rmlya wa'almas – fi taqriz al'anaa alqary") (Al-Mashriq, Year 90, Part Two, July–December 2016), pp. 493–515.
7. "The Cloak of Ash, Body of Light, by Basma Al-Sayyad – A Reading in the Art of Fragment and Narration" (original text: "mietf alramad jasad aldaw' li bisima alsyad – qara'at fi fnay alshadhra walsard") (Al-Mashriq, Year 90, Part One, January–June 2016), pp. 91–108.
8. "The art of the fragment and the very short story – the cloak of ash as a model" (original text: "fn alshadhrt walqssa alqasira jddaan – mietf alramad anmwdhjaan")(Contemporary Writings, Issue 96, July – August 2015), pp. 99–102.
9. "The Objective Criticism Methodology – In Search of the Lost Tune" (original text: "mnahij alnaqd almwdweaty – fi albahth ean alnaghm aldaye") (Al-Mashriq, Year 89, Part Two, July–December 2015), pp. 669–687.
10. "Literary Research in the Shadow of the Computer and the Internet - a Point of View" (original text: "albahth aladby fi 'dl alkumbywtr wal'iintarint - wijhat n'dar") (Al-Mashriq, Year 89, Part One, January–June 2015), pp. 161–179.
11. "On the threshold of the synagogue – An attempt to understand Judaism and Jews" (original text: "elaa atabat alkanisa – muhawalat fi fahm alyhwdya walyhud") (Al-Mashriq, Year 88, Part Two, July–December 2014) pp. 525–561.
12. "The Roses and Opium, or the Conflict of Art and Religion" (original text: "alwurid wal'ufyun 'aw sirae alfn waldin") (Al-Mashriq, Year 88, Part One, January–June 2014), pp. 125–152.
13. "Rain and Rose or the Dialectic of Religion and Literature" (original text: "almtar walwarad 'aw jdlyt aldiyn wal'adb") (Annals, Saint Joseph University Press in Beirut, October 2018), pp. 85–112.
14. "The Roman Diary – Journals to the Eternal City" (original text: "almfkirt alrwmanya- ywmyat rihlatan 'iilaa almadinat alkhalida") (Al-Mashriq, Year 87, Part Two, July–December 2013), pp. 431–451.
15. "Read to live – why? What? How? When and where to read?" (original text: "an naqra linahya – lma? ma'dha? kayf? mataa wa'ayn naqara?") (Al-Mashriq, Year 86, Part Two, July–December 2012) pp. 601–613.
16. "Selected Fragments of Erotic Bataille "(original text: "ishdhirat muntakhabat min 'iyrwsya batay") (translation).
17. "Saeed Akl, a legendary poet in Magdalene and Qadamous" (original text: "seyd eaql shaeraan astwryaan fi almjdlyt wqadmws") (Al-Mashriq, Year 86, Part One, January–June 2012), pp. 127–147.
18. "Ameen Nakhlah, the Poet, the Artist" (original text: "amin nakhla alshshaeir alfnnan") (Al-Mashreq, Year 85, Part One, January–June 2011) pp. 245–257.
19. "Mikhail Naima, a literary critic" (original text: "mykhayiyl naeimat naqdaan adbyaan") (Al-Mashriq, Sunna 84, Part One, January–June 2010), pp. 201–224.
20. "The Lebanese Story between the Two Wars" (original text: "alqssa allbnanya bayn alharbin") (Al-Hikma, Issue 30, December 1997), pp. 89–97.
21. "Jabbour Abdel Nour, The Literary Dictionary" (original text: "jbbwr eabd alnuwr almuejam aladby") (Al-Hikma, Issue 28, October 1997), pp. 64–65.
22. "Greats on the deathbed" (original text: "U'dama' ealaa farash almawat") (Al-Hikma, Issue 23, March 1997), pp. 96–97.
23. "The Radical Criticism – The Axis" (original text: "alnaqd aljdhry – almhwry") (Al-Hikma, Issue 21, January 1997), pp. 53–56.

== Presenting and editing ==
1. An introduction to Basma Al-Sayyadi's book, "The Matter of Ash, the Body of Light" (original text: mietf alramad jasad aldaw') (poetry, narration and wisdom), Beirut, Dar Al-Watan Leaves, 1st Edition, 2014.
2. Submission of Jacqueline Ashkar's album Lebbos, "Gardens of Colors" (original text: hadayiq al'alwan) (art book), Beirut, Darwakat Al-Zaman, 1st Edition, 2017.
3. Editing and presentation of Dr. Antoine Maalouf's book, "So That Trees Are Not Withered" (original text: htta la taybis al'ashjar) (Articles), Beirut, Darwakat Al-Zaman, 1st Edition, 2019.
4. Editing of the Scientific Research Curricula Handbook (original text: dalil manahij albahth alelmy), Faculty of Arts and Humanities, Lebanese University, 1st Edition, 2020.

== Academic career ==
In 1985, when he was 18 years old he became a teacher, after obtaining his BA Degree. He taught Arabic language and sociology, history, geography and education at Rahibat Sydt Alrusul Institute, Qab Ilyas, for six years. Then he taught at Sydt Alrusul High School, New Rawda, Beirut, between 1991 and 1995. He taught Arabic language and literature for elementary and high school. Between 1995 and 2010 he taught Arabic language and translation of French Lebanese lycée, Ashrafieh, Beirut. Speaking about his educational career, Joseph Labbos said in a radio interview that was conducted with him on the radio broadcast of Lebanon: I wrote a book of "Golden apples in baskets of silver" because of my need for the information in it. I needed to provide my students in every reading lesson with a quote from the great sayings. So I had to collect 166 articles and each topic includes 10 sayings, so this book accompanied me in my entire educational career". After obtaining his doctorate in 2003, he became a lecturer in 2009 in the subject of teaching methods, at the Lebanese University, the third branch, Tripoli. In 2010 he taught the subject of informatics, language, literature and civilization in the first and third branch. Also, he was a lecture in 2011–2013 in the subjects of literature and religion, and masterpieces of literature International, and textual approaches to modern Arab thought, at Saint Joseph University (Jesuit). He taught in Oriental Literature Institute, Beirut, and a number of Bachelor's and Master's students at the Lebanese University, Department of Arabic Language and Literature, Branch 1, Beirut; Until he became a full-time assistant professor at the Lebanese University in 2013, and then a professor in 2017.
