= Dwight Eastman =

Dwight Eastman was the last mayor of West Carleton Township before it was amalgamated into the new City of Ottawa.

Eastman served as mayor of West Carleton from 1995 until 2001. He was elected in the 2000 Ottawa election as city councillor representing the new West Carleton Ward. He served as a city councillor until 2003.

Eastman ran for the Ontario Liberal Party in the 1999 Ontario general election in Lanark—Carleton, but lost to Norm Sterling.

Currently, Eastman serves as a director on the Carleton Landowners Association which favours the separation of rural parts of Ottawa to form a new Carleton County municipality.

Preceded by Stewart Baird	Township councillor for Fitzroy Ward; 1991-1994	Succeeded by Bert Reitsma (Ward 2)
Preceded by Roland Armitage	Mayors of West Carleton Township; 1994-2001	Succeeded by Position abolished
Preceded by None, ward amalgamated into Ottawa in 2000	City councillors from West Carleton Ward; 2001-2003	Succeeded by Eli El-Chantiry
