= John Neil (Canadian politician) =

Canadian politician

John Neil (1808 – after 1878) was an Irish-born farmer, justice of the peace and politician in Ontario. He served as reeve of Fitzroy Township, Ontario from 1863 to 1864, in 1867 and from 1872 to 1877.

He was born in Croghan, King's County, near Tipperary and came to Canada in 1834 to acquire land for himself and his brothers. He arrived in Bytown and then walked to Fitzroy township to inspect his land grants. In June of the following year, he returned to Ireland to marry Elizabeth Hodgins. On his return, he was provided with law books so that he could act as a magistrate and was named district councillor for Fitzroy. He represented Fitzroy on the district and county councils until 1848 and again from 1855 to 1878.
