= Constance Bay =

- Population centre
- Location within Ottawa
- Coordinates: 45.48636°N 76.07316°W
- Country: Canada
- Province: Ontario
- Municipality: Ottawa

Government
  - MPs: Bruce Fanjoy (LPC)
  - MPPs: Karen McCrimmon (OLP)
  - Councillors: Clarke Kelly

Area
  - Total: 5.56 km^{2} (2.15 sq mi)

Population (2016)
  - Total: 2,314
  - Density: 416/km^{2} (1,080/sq mi)
- Time zone: EST
- Postal code: K0A3M0

Constance Bay is a population centre in West Carleton-March Ward in the rural northwest of the city of Ottawa, Ontario, Canada. Prior to amalgamation in 2001, the community was part of West Carleton Township. It is situated 25 km northwest of the suburb of Kanata. The community surrounds the Torbolton Forest (a protected and managed green-space) and is located on a peninsula between Constance and Buckham's Bay on the Ottawa River. According to the Canada 2016 Census, the population of the community was 2,314. 86% of dwellings are occupied by usual residents.

The community has services of a (licensed) general store, 2 restaurants, a bar/lounge, and a chapel. The Royal Canadian Legion, Branch 616 is also located in the village.

A Community Centre is located in the centre of the community, the centre's operation is overseen by the Constance & Buckham's Bay Community Association. The Community Centre includes a free skateboard park along with 2 baseball diamonds (both fully illuminated for night play), soccer fields (full and mini), play-structure, outdoor ice rink, and a concession stand operated by community volunteers.

== History ==
The bay itself was named by French Fur Traders after Simon Constant who was a member of the Algonquin First Nation and who was in the area before white settlers arrived.

T.W. Edwin Sowter, a hobby archaeologist from Aylmer, Quebec, first identified the presence of archaeological sites at Constance Bay in the late 1800s. However, details of these sites were not available until Gordon Watson excavated a site in his Constance Bay cottage yard in the early 1970s. Watson's documented his findings in "A Woodland Indian Site at Constance Bay" available from the Ontario Archaeological Society. One item in the Watson collection is a large reconstructed ceramic vessel dating to about 2,500 years ago.

In 1946 St. Gabriel's first chapel opened for services. Father J. Lorne Reynolds appointed parish priest.

Hydro (electric service) was brought into the community in the summer of 1951.

In the spring/summer of 2005, Enbridge Gas Distribution brought Natural Gas to the community.

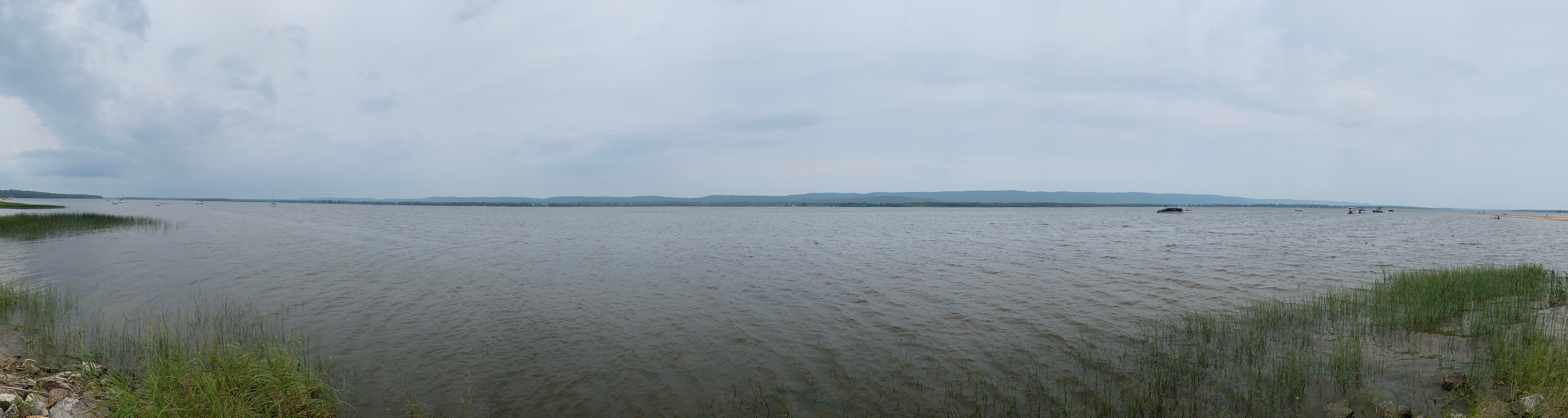
Panoramic view from the north tip of Constance Bay

== Nature ==
The 147-hectare Torbolton Forest is a managed greenspace and home to rare plant life, animals and birds. The forest has been designated by the Province of Ontario as a provincially significant Area of Natural and Scientific Interest (Life Science).

=== Birds ===
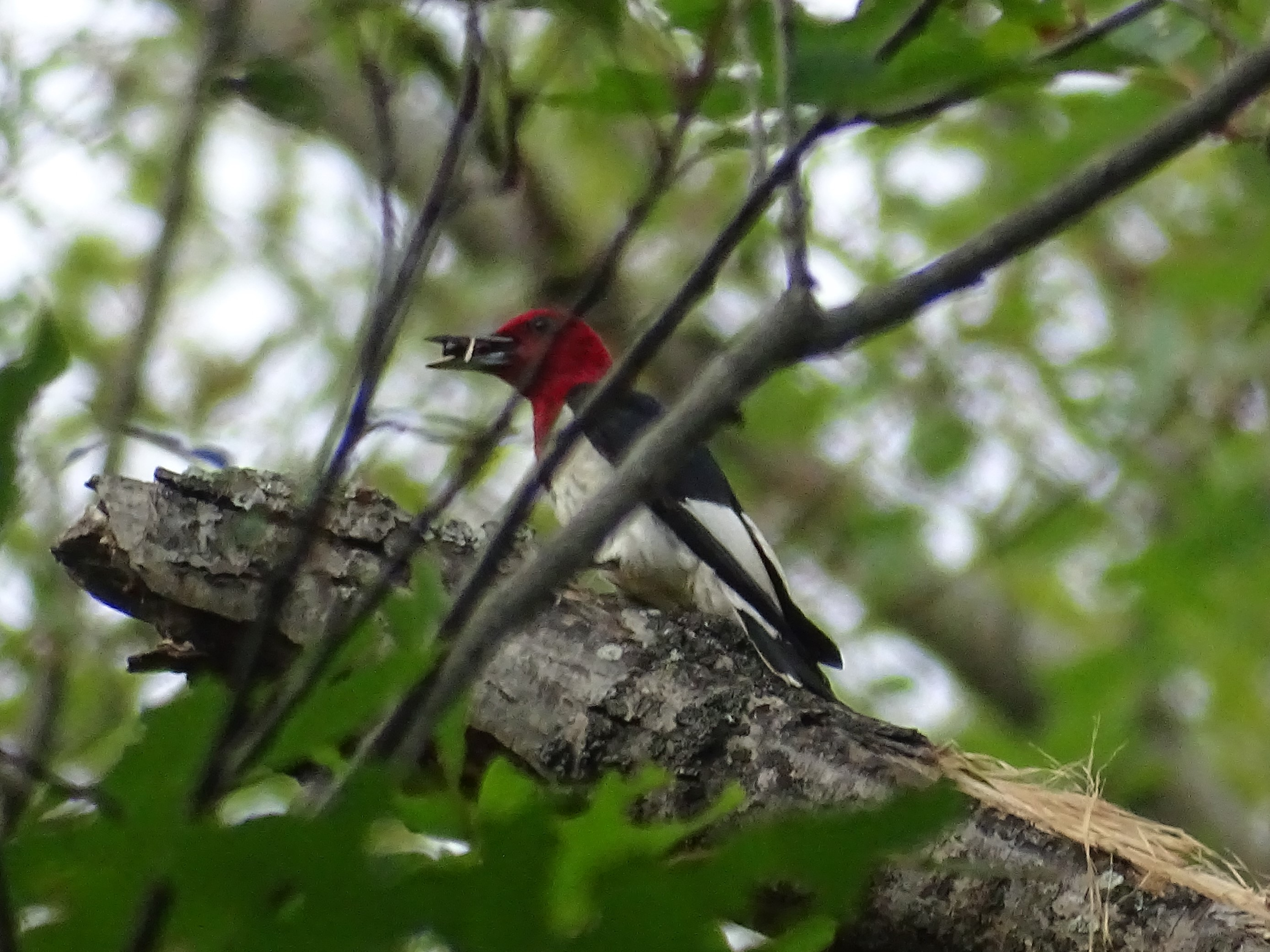
Adult red-headed woodpecker in the Torbolton Forest

The Constance Bay peninsula including Torbolton Forest is a hotspot for birds, with almost 250 species recorded in the area as of 2021. The following list contains both species that regularly breed in the area and vagrants that have been recorded on few occasions.

- Red-headed woodpecker
  - Red-headed woodpeckers have bred in this forest since the early 2000s if not longer, making it the only known location where this species currently breeds in Ottawa.
- Northern flicker
- Downy woodpecker
- Hairy woodpecker
- Black-capped chickadee
- Eastern bluebird
- Mourning dove
- Northern cardinal
- Baltimore oriole
- Blue jay
- Pileated woodpecker
- Red phalarope
- Greater white-fronted goose
- Carolina wren
- Black-legged kittiwake
  - A juvenile was reported flying downriver in October 2004
- Boreal owl
- Cattle egret
  - This species was reported flying southwest in November 2006
- Great blue heron
- Ruby-throated hummingbird
- Red-winged blackbird
- Common grackle
- American crow

=== Mammals ===
- Raccoon
- Skunk
- Porcupine
- Black bear
- White-tailed deer
- Red fox
- Coyote
- Fisher
