= Fitzroy Harbour =

- Village
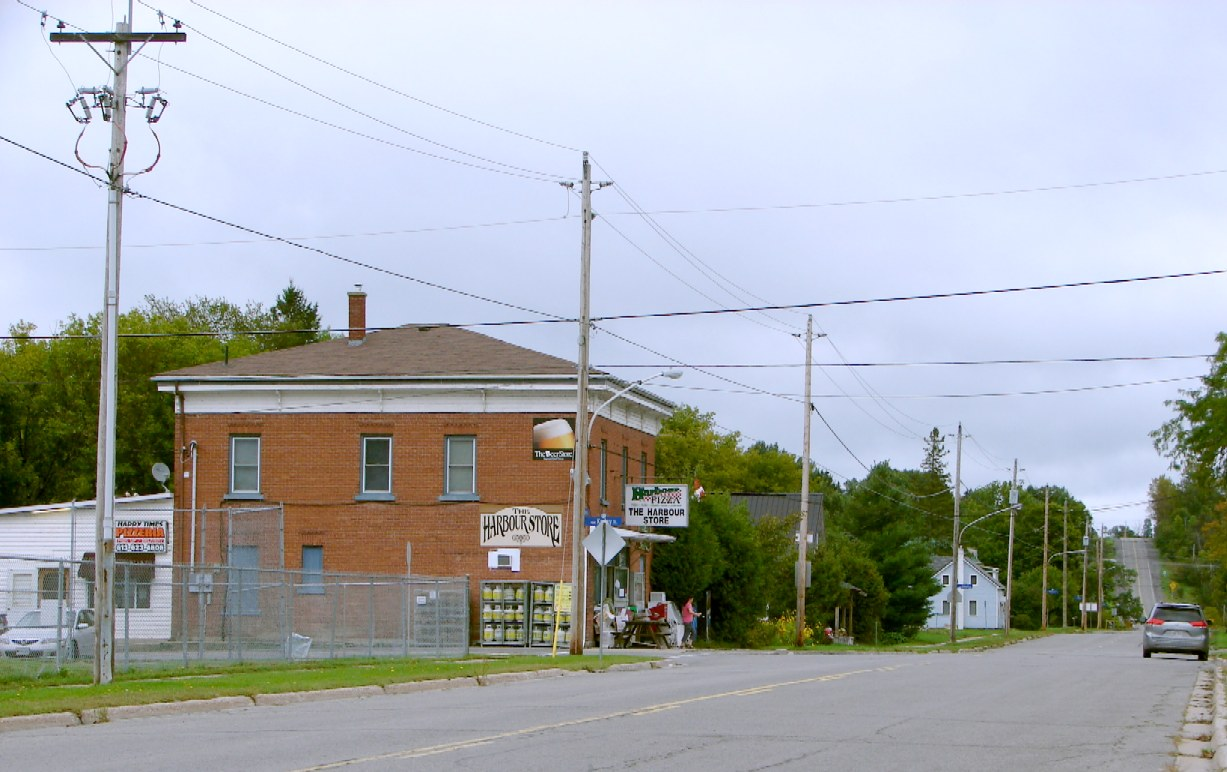

- Location in Ottawa
- Coordinates: 45°28′20″N 76°11′40″W
- Country: Canada
- Province: Ontario
- Municipality: Ottawa
- Established: 1831
- Amalgamated: 1974 (West Carleton Township); 2001 (City of Ottawa)

Government
  - MP: Bruce Fanjoy (LPC)
  - MPP: Karen McCrimmon (OLP)
  - City Councillor: Clarke Kelly
- Time zone: UTC-5 (Eastern (EST))
  - Summer (DST): UTC-4 (EDT)
- Postal code: K0A 1X0
- Area codes: 613, 343

Fitzroy Harbour is a small village within the city of Ottawa in eastern Ontario, Canada. It is located on the Ottawa River at the mouth of the Carp River. A branch of the Mississippi River, known as the Snye, also empties into the Ottawa to the west of the village.

Fitzroy Provincial Park is located nearby. The village has one school located within it, St. Michael's Catholic school. Fitzroy Harbour Public School was closed in 2006. There are also two churches: St Michael's (Roman Catholic) and St. Andrew's (United). St. George's (Anglican) was closed in 2022.

== History ==
The town was founded by Charles Shirreff in 1831. There was a waterfall known as Chats Falls on the river Ottawa River, later replaced by a hydroelectric power station and dam, currently operated by Ontario Power Generation.

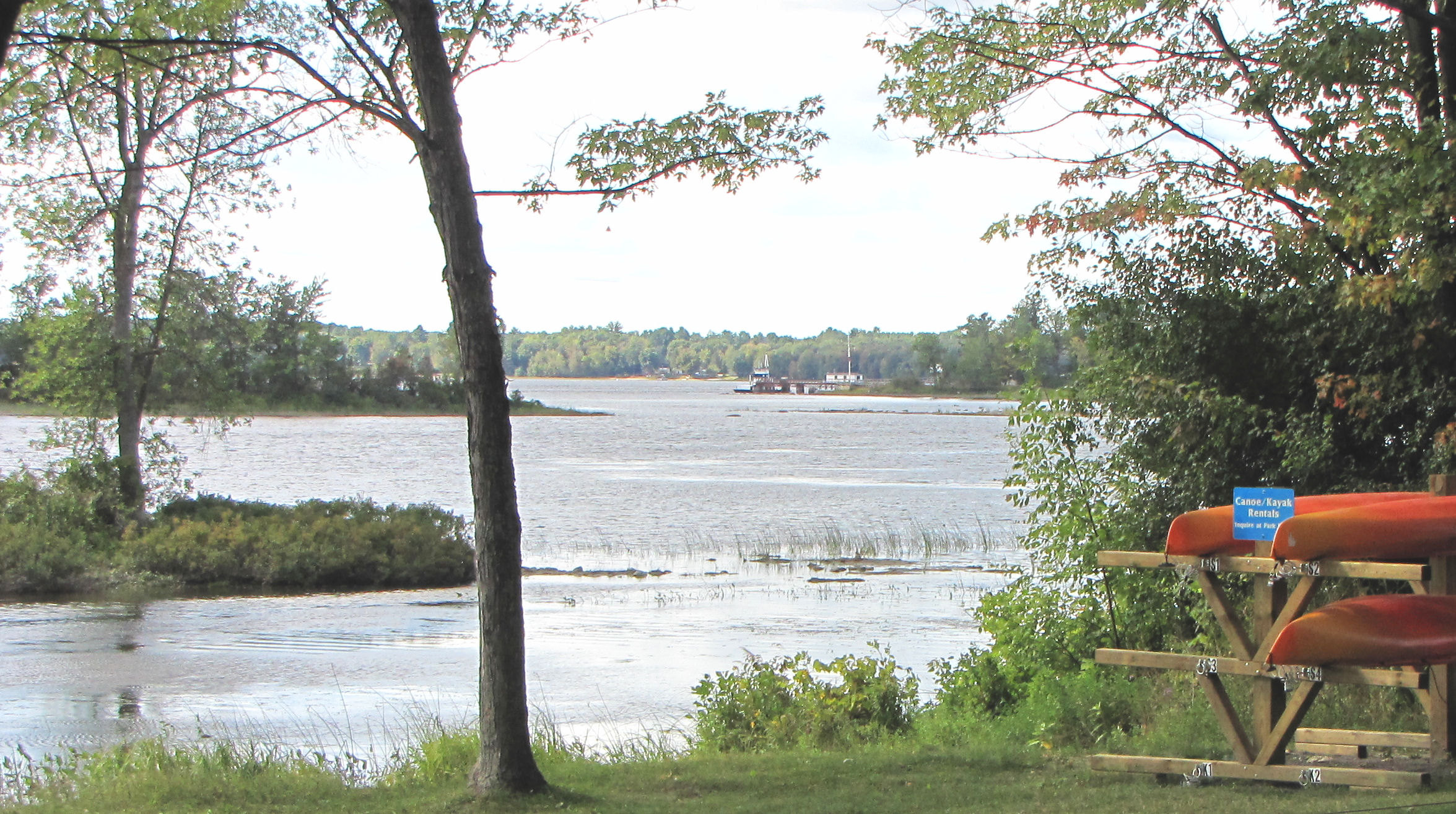
Fitzroy Provincial Park on the Ottawa River

By 1866, Fitzroy Harbour was a post village with a population of 200, within Fitzroy Township, on the Ottawa river, at the head of the Duchesne lake navigation, on a small bay, dotted with islands. The Chats Falls, which form eleven falls, and plunge thirty-three feet is nearby. On the south side of the river, directly opposite the village, was the Government timber slide. The community had hydroelectric power, manufacturing, three churches, built of stone: the Church of England, the Canada Presbyterian church, and the Roman Catholic church. The Fourth Division Court was held here and at Riddle's Corners, alternately. The Loyal Orange Lodge, No. 541, met at thc Orange Hall, on the first Friday in each month.

In 1974, Fitzroy Township was amalgamated with Huntley and Torbolton to form West Carleton.

In 1977, the Fitzroy Harbour Community Centre was constructed. This facility currently features a main hall and meeting rooms, two softball diamonds, soccer pitches, a playground and an outdoor rink.

In 2001, West Carleton Township became part of the new City of Ottawa.

The estimated population of the village in 2021 was 580.
