= Carp River (Ottawa) =

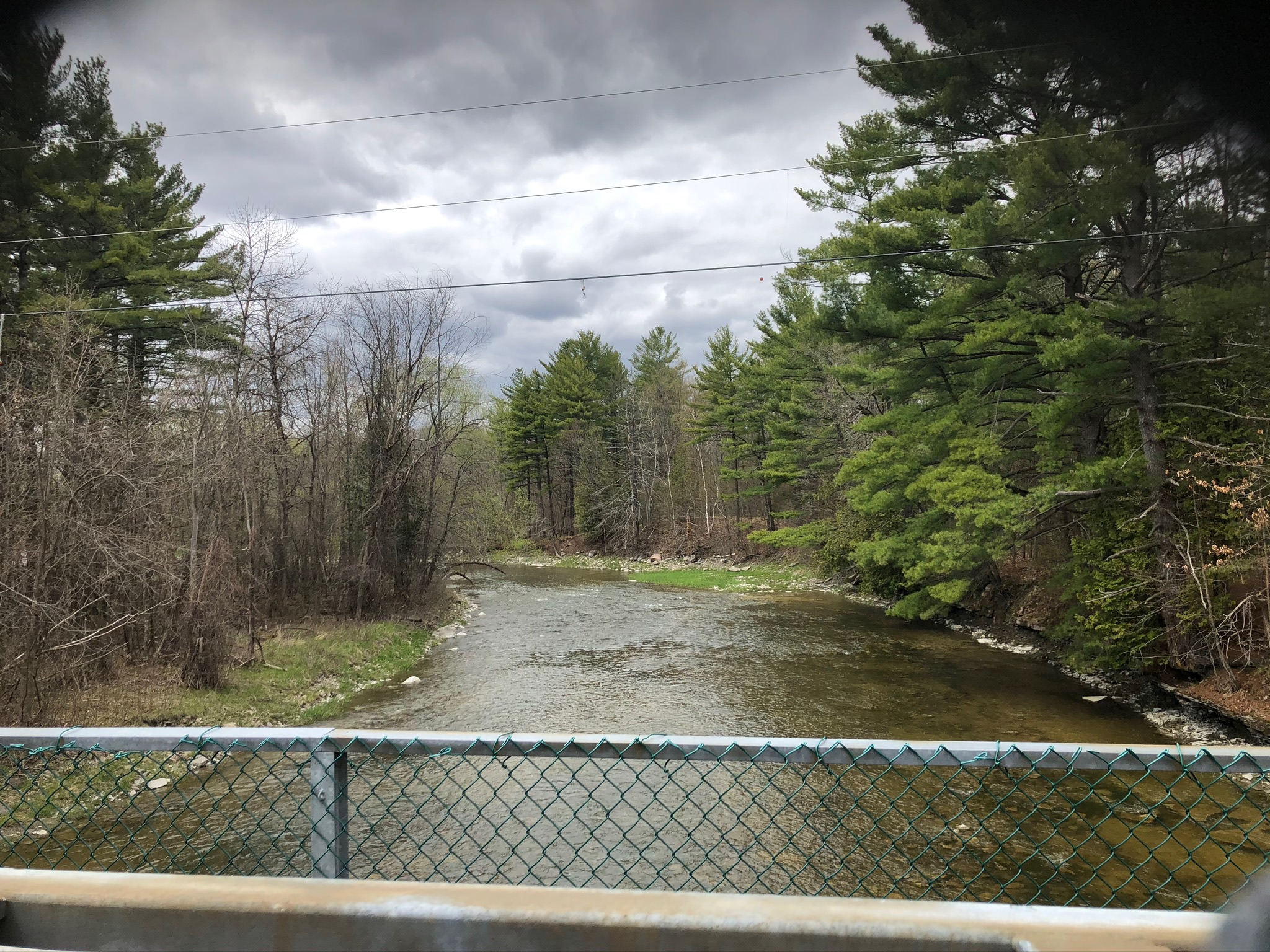

- Location of the mouth of the Carp River in Eastern Ontario
- Etymology: From the French carpes à cochon

Location
- Country: Canada
- Province: Ontario
- Region: Eastern Ontario
- Municipality: Ottawa

Physical characteristics
- Source
  - location: Kanata
  - coordinates: 45°18′07″N 75°52′07″W
  - elevation: 113 m (371 ft)
- Mouth: Ottawa River
  - location: Fitzroy Harbour
  - coordinates: 45°28′59″N 76°13′37″W
  - elevation: 54 m (177 ft)
- Length: 42 km (26 mi)

Basin features
- River system: Saint Lawrence River drainage basin

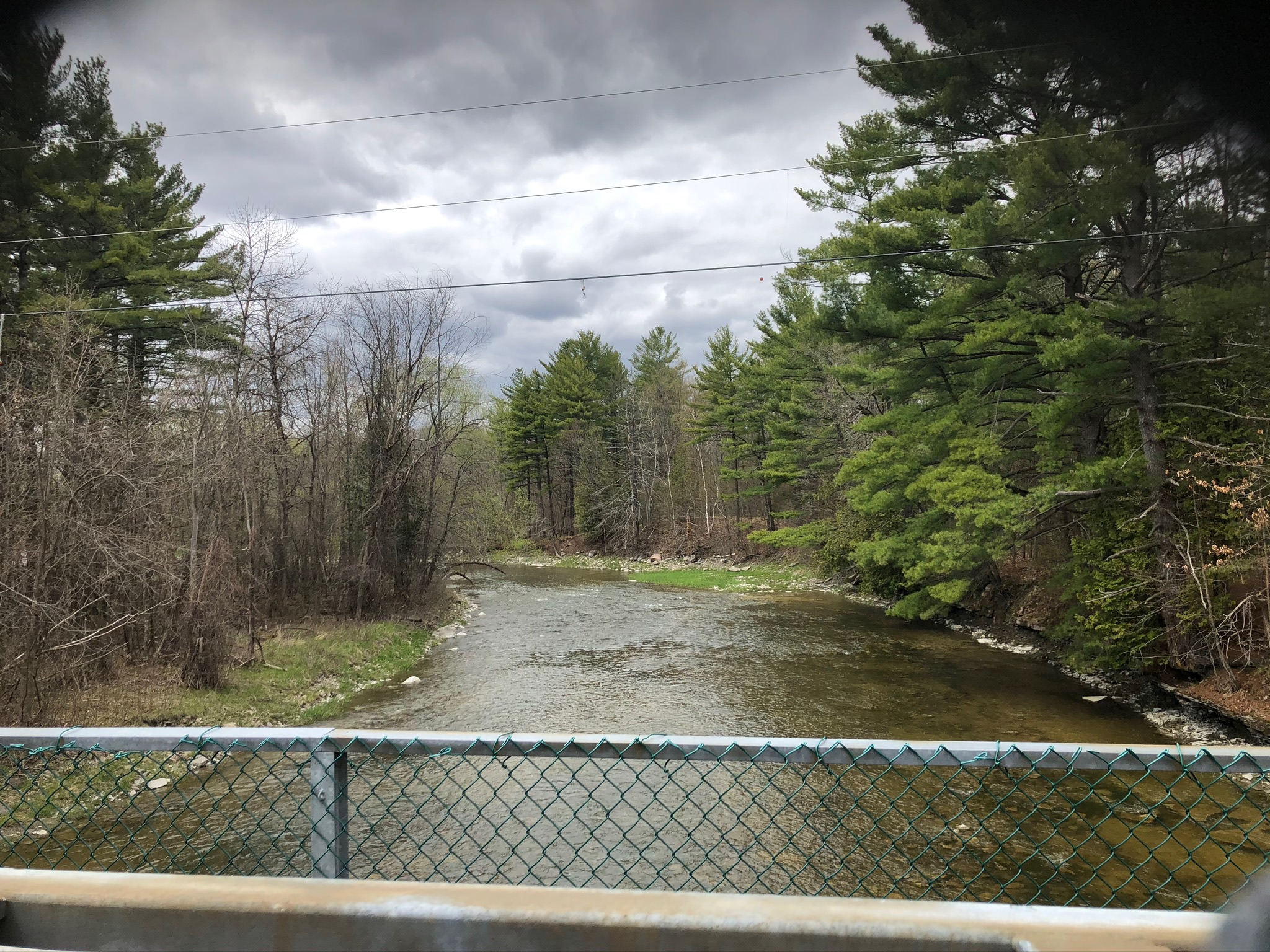
Carp River running through Fitzroy Harbour Provincial Park

The Carp River is a river in the city of Ottawa, Ontario, Canada. It is 42 kilometres (26 miles) long and its watershed drains an area of approximately 306 km^{2} spread across Stittsville, Kanata, and West Carleton-March. The headwaters originate as the upper Carp River (also called Carp Creek), which runs southwest from Appaloosa Park under Eagleson Road through Glen Cairn where it empties into the marshes and storm water ponds south of the Canadian Tire Centre. From there it flows north through West Carleton-March into the Ottawa River at Fitzroy Harbour. The Carp River has four major tributaries: Poole Creek, Feedmill Creek, Huntley Creek, and Corkery Creek. The watershed is administered by the Mississippi Valley Conservation Authority.

The Carp River likely takes its name from the abundance of native sucker fish (White Sucker - Catostomos commersonii) found in the river by early European explorers or settlers. The French name for sucker fish is carpe and the native suckers bear some resemblance to the common European Carp (Cyprinus carpio), especially around the mouth. They prefer the shallow, warm, slow moving waters of the Carp River and inhabit the river today, along with introduced European Carp.

In the spring there is enough run-off water from melting ice that the Carp River becomes a whitewater paddling site. The put-in is beside a bridge (crossing the river) on Carp Road between Kinburn Side Road and Galetta Side Road. The whitewater is class 2 to 3 and excellent for kayaking and canoeing.

== Carp River restoration ==
Planning and analysis for this initiative has been underway since 2000 and involves numerous stormwater, sanitary, transportation, and waterflow projects. The Carp River Restoration Plan will enhance the river with a narrower low flow channel that improves sediment transport, vegetation along the river banks, and habitat features such as fish habitat pools and wetlands. The project is expected to be complete by 2021.

== See also ==
- List of rivers of Ontario

== Sources ==
- "Carp River". Geographical Names Data Base. Natural Resources Canada.
- "Toporama - Topographic Map Sheets 31F8, 31G5". Atlas of Canada. Natural Resources Canada. Archived from the original on 2010-08-31.
