= West Carleton-March Ward =

West Carleton-March
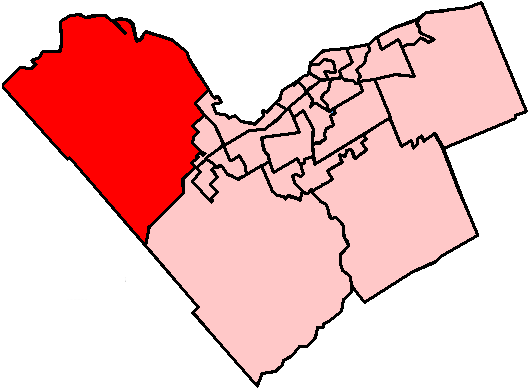
- Location within Ottawa
- Coordinates: 45°22′N 76°06′W
- Country: Canada
- Province: Ontario
- City: Ottawa

Government
  - Councillor: Clarke Kelly

Area
  - Total: 763 km^{2} (295 sq mi)

Population (2011)Canada 2016 Census
  - Total: 23,635
  - Density: 31.0/km^{2} (80.2/sq mi)

Languages (2016)
  - English: 86.0%
  - French: 7.5%
  - German: 1.1%
- Avg. income: $48,454

West Carleton-March Ward (Ward 5) is a city ward in Ottawa, Ontario, Canada.

Ward 5 was created for the 1994 Regional elections. At the time, it consisted of West Carleton Township, Goulbourn Township and Rideau Township. It was given the name Western Townships Ward in 1997. When Ottawa was amalgamated, the Ward was reduced to just West Carleton, and renamed West Carleton Ward. Its first election as West Carleton Ward was in 2000. In 2006, the boundaries were altered, and the ward was given its present name. Its southern border became Highway 7 and the Queensway and it lost some areas in the southeastern part of the ward. The ward also added the rural northern portion of the former city of Kanata. Its population in 2006 was 23,400 – the second least populated ward. Its area is 763 km^{2}, the largest city ward. It was represented by Eli El-Chantiry on Ottawa City Council from 2003 until 2022 when he retired. Clarke Kelly won the 2022 election to represent the ward.

Following the 2020 Ottawa Ward boundary review, the ward lost small sections of territory in the South March area and north of Stittsville to accommodate proposed housing developments.

== Communities ==
Communities in the ward include Antrim, Fitzroy Harbour, Galetta, Kinburn, Marathon, Marathon Village, Marshall Bay, Mohr Corners, Panmure, Quyon Ferry Landing, Smith's Corners, Vydon Acres, Willola Beach, Woodridge, Baskin's Beach, Buckhams Bay, Constance Bay, Crown Point, Dirleton, Dunrobin, Dunrobin Heights, Dunrobin Shore, Kilmaurs, MacLarens, McKay's Waterfront, Torwood Estates, Woodlawn, Carp, Corkery, Huntley, Huntley Manor Estates, Manion Corners, Westmont Estates, Westwood, Marchhurst, Harwood Plains and Malwood.

== City councillors ==
1. Betty Hill (1994–2001); regional councillor
2. Dwight Eastman (2001–2003)
3. Eli El-Chantiry (2003–2022)
4. Clarke Kelly (2022–present)

== Election results ==
=== 2000 Ottawa municipal election ===
City council
Candidate	Votes	%
Dwight Eastman	3420	50.07
David Whiteman	2559	37.47
Harold O. Daley	851	12.46

=== 2003 Ottawa municipal election ===
City council
Candidate	Votes	%
Eli El-Chantiry	2738	44.61
Adele Muldoon	2709	44.14
Daryl W. Craig	480	7.82
Jim Jenkins	210	3.42

=== 2006 Ottawa municipal election ===
Incumbent councillor Eli El-Chantiry, a Liberal, who won his last election by 29 votes, faces the more Conservative opponent of J.P. Dorion. Dorion has worked for Arnprior Ottawa Auto Parts for 12 years.

City council
Candidate	Votes	%
Eli El-Chantiry	6683	67.13
J.P. Dorion	3273	32.87

=== 2010 Ottawa municipal election ===
City council
Candidate	Votes	%
Eli El-Chantiry	6239	77.40
James Parsons	1200	14.89
Alexander Aronec	622	7.72

=== 2014 Ottawa municipal election ===
City council
Candidate	Vote	%
Eli El-Chantiry (X)	4,808	56.87
Jonathan Mark	2,999	35.47
Brendan Gorman	270	3.19
James Parsons	193	2.28
Alexander Aronec	185	2.19

Ottawa mayor (Ward results)
Candidate	Vote	%
Jim Watson	5,251	63.04
Mike Maguire	2,765	33.20
Darren W. Wood	86	1.03
Rebecca Pyrah	76	0.91
Robert White	68	0.82
Anwar Syed	36	0.43
Bernard Couchman	24	0.29
Michael St. Arnaud	23	0.28

=== 2018 Ottawa municipal election ===
Council candidate	Vote	%
Eli El-Chantiry	5,099	65.90
Judi Varga-Toth	2,132	27.56
James Parsons	506	6.54

=== 2022 Ottawa municipal election ===
Council candidate	Vote	%
Clarke Kelly	2,550	27.40
Sasha Duguay	2,307	24.79
Greg Patacairk	1,988	21.36
Stephanie Maghnam	1,404	15.09
Nagmani Sharma	542	5.82
Ian Madill	438	4.71
Colin Driscoll	78	0.84

=== 2026 Ottawa municipal election ===
2026 Ottawa municipal election: West Carleton-March
Candidate	Popular vote			Expenditures
Candidate	Votes	%	±%	Expenditures
Clarke Kelly (X)	5,239	60.26		
Christine Harrison	3,095	35.60		
Dylan Nosé	360	4.14		
Total valid votes	8,754			
Total rejected, unmarked and declined votes				
Turnout		39.10		
Eligible voters	22,389			
Note: Candidate campaign colours are based on the prominent colour used in campaign items (signs, literature, etc.) and are used as a visual differentiation between candidates.
