= James Steen (politician) =

James Steen (died 1862) was an Irish-born farmer and politician in Ontario. He served as the first reeve of Fitzroy Township, Ontario from 1850 to 1854.

He came to Canada in 1818, settling in Drummond township. Steen later moved near the village of Pakenham. He subsequently returned to Ireland to marry Rose Ann McKibbon, returning to Upper Canada with his new bride. In 1831, Steen moved again to a new location, soon known as Steen's Falls, near the current town of Galetta and built a mill on the Mississippi River there. After Dr. Hubbell was able to purchase the water rights for that location, Steen moved down river and built a grist mill, shingle mill and lumber mill. He served as a justice of the peace for the area and also sat as a municipal councillor at Perth until 1850, when he became reeve for the new township of Fitzroy. In 1862, Steen was caught in the machinery at one of his mills and died two weeks later.
