= Fitzroy Provincial Park =

Provincial park in Ontario, Canada

- IUCN category II (national park)
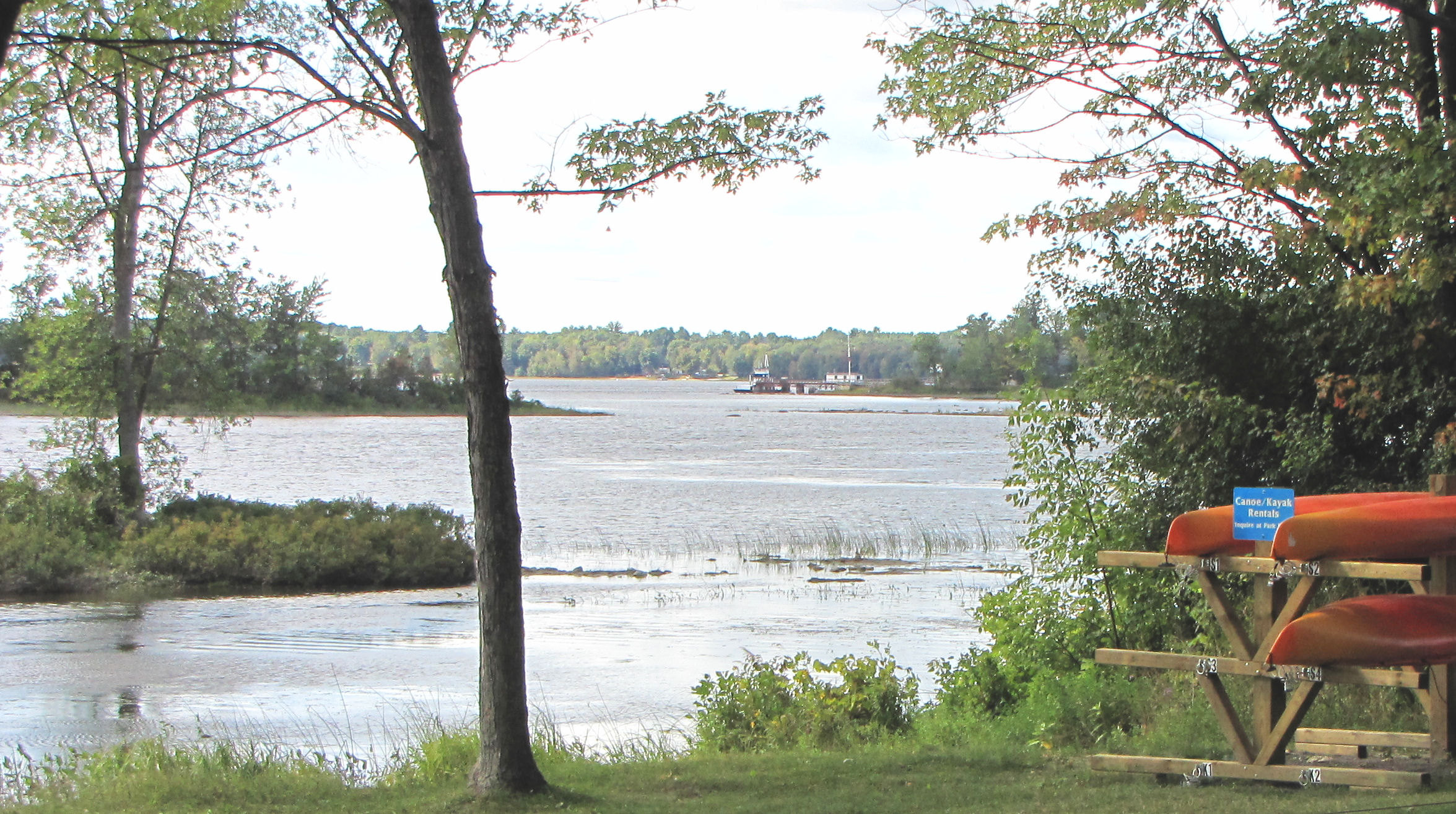
- View of Fitzroy Harbour from park playground

- Location within Southern Ontario
- Interactive map of Fitzroy Provincial Park
- Location: Fitzroy Harbour, Ontario, Canada
- Nearest city: Ottawa, Ontario
- Coordinates: 45°28′57″N 76°13′4″W
- Area: 185 hectares (460 acres)
- Visitors: 112,980 (in 2022)
- Governing body: Ontario Parks
- Website: www.ontarioparks.ca/park/fitzroy

Fitzroy Provincial Park is a provincial park in the Fitzroy harbour community in the north end of the city of Ottawa, on the Ottawa River in Ontario, Canada, designated as recreational-class by Ontario Parks. White pine covers much of the park. The park has century-old trees and a stand of 300-year-old bur oaks by the Carp River. There are two campgrounds within the park, both with comfort stations, a boat launch and park store. The main campgrounds have 235 campsites, 107 with electrical service, 205 with room for trailers, and a separate area with facilities for group camping and picnicking.

Cross-country skiing is available in the winter on trails maintained by the West Carleton Nordic Ski Club.

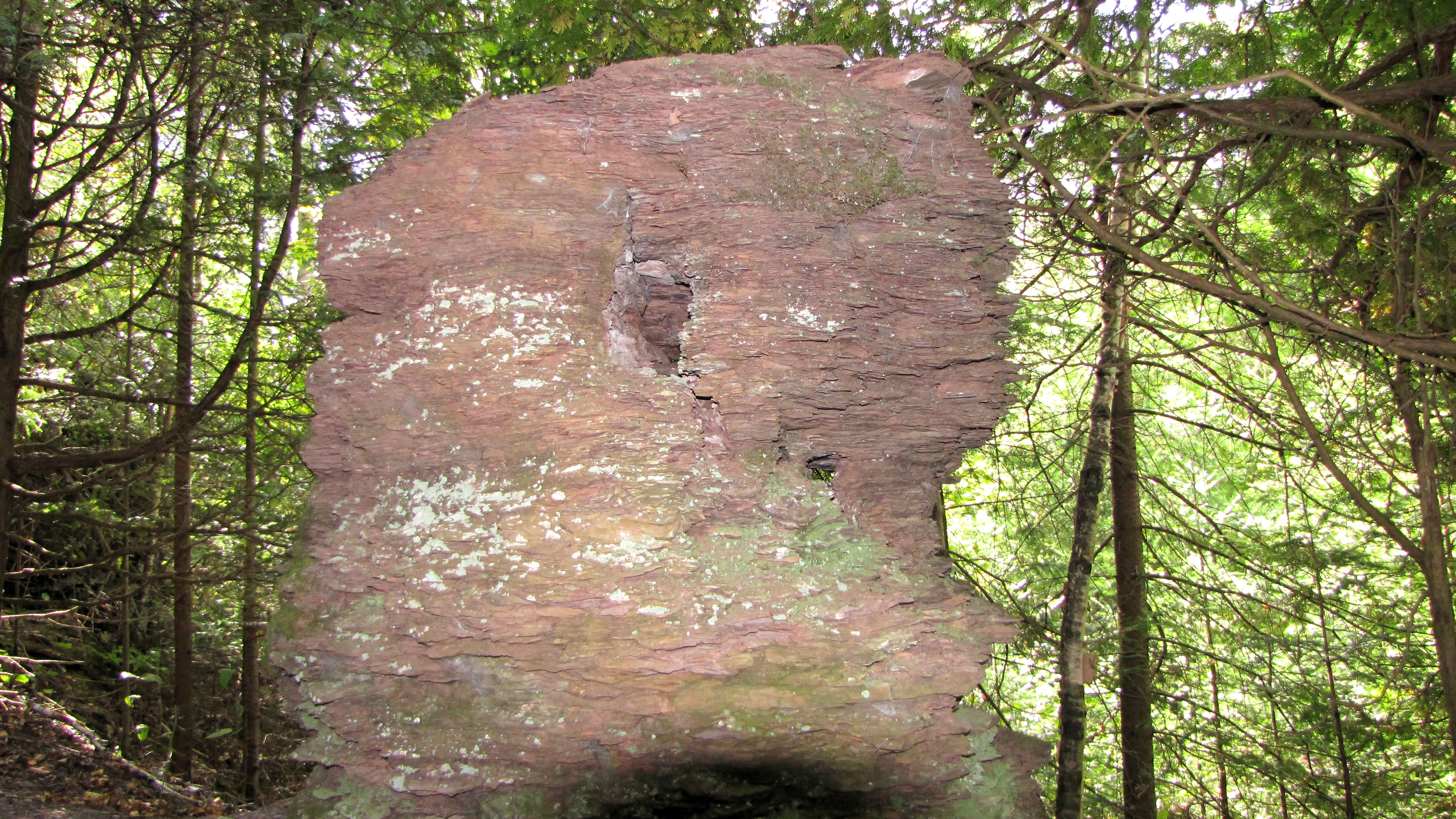
Shale pillar along Terraces Trail

== See also ==
- List of Ontario parks
