= Charles Shirreff (businessman) =

Canadian businessman and public official

Charles Shirreff (26 July 1768 – 5 May 1847) was an early Canadian businessman and public official.

He was born in Leith, Scotland in 1768. In 1817, he migrated to Smith's Creek, later Port Hope, in Upper Canada. He obtained a grant of land in Fitzroy Township in the upper Ottawa Valley and moved there in 1818. He founded the town of Fitzroy Harbour, Ontario on the Ottawa River in 1831 and built a grist mill there.

His son, Robert, took the post of deputy surveyor general of woods, which regulated tree cutting on public lands in Upper and Lower Canada by collecting dues. Shirreff set up an informal arrangement where he measured the timber at Bytown and Robert collected the dues at Quebec City where the rafts of timber were sold. Shirreff proposed a new system, which was accepted in 1832, where a system of timber limits was used to control the cutting of trees on crown lands. A down payment was paid by the lumber company and then the fees were paid in full when the timber was sold.

This system was challenged in 1832 on the Gatineau River due to illegal cutting along the river; this area was exempted from public sale of timber limits. Although Shirreff protested, the "Gatineau Privilege" remained in place. A scandal surfaced when the company managing affairs at Quebec went bankrupt; it was discovered that they had been accepting promissory notes rather than bonds, resulting in lost revenue to the provinces. The Shirreffs were replaced in the Bytown office in 1836. Charles continued to expand his business interests at Fitzroy Harbour, adding a sawmill and a store.

During the 1830s, Shirreff promoted a plan to connect the Ottawa River to Georgian Bay via a canal.

Shirreff died in Bytown in 1847.
