= Qabb Ilyas =

Qabb Ilyas مدينة قب إلياس Qab Elias, Qoub Elias, Kabelias
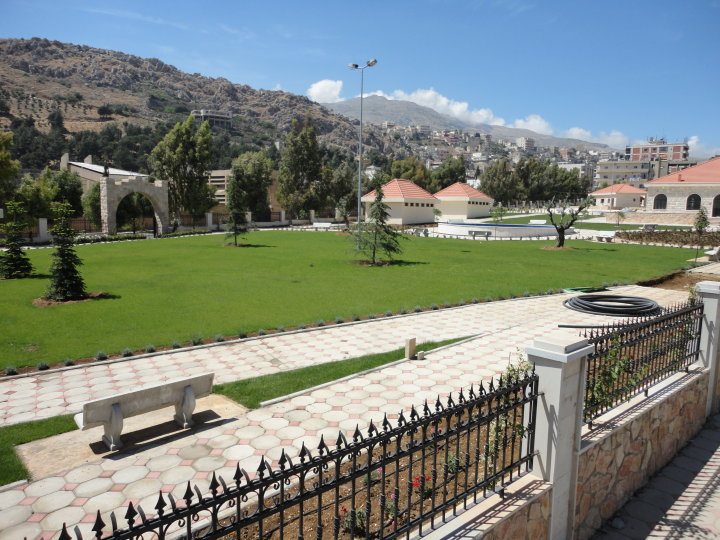
- Municipal Public Garden

- Seal

- Location in Lebanon
- Coordinates: 33°47′55″N 35°49′30″E
- Country: Lebanon
- Governorate: Beqaa
- District: Zahle

Population (2011)
  - Total: 50,000
- Website: http://www.kabelias.org

Qabb Ilyas (Arabic: قب إلياس; ALA-LC: Qab Ilyās / Lebanese Arabic: [ʔabbljes]) also spelled Kab Elias, Qab Elias, Qob Elias, Qoub Elias) is a municipality in Zahle District, in eastern Lebanon. Qabb Ilyas is 15 kilometers from Zahleh and 45 kilometers (28 miles) from the Lebanese capital Beirut. Its average elevation above sea level is 950 meters (3,120 feet). Its area is approximately 32 km^{2}. Qabb Ilyas is the third largest city in the Beqaa Valley, after Zahleh and Baalbek in terms of area size. The majority of the residents are Sunni Muslims.

== Etymology ==
According to the 19th-century Lebanese historian Haydar al-Shihabi, the town was originally called al-Muruj. Local tradition holds that the town's current name "Qabb Ilyas" is derived from Qabr Elias ("grave of Elias"), but was shortened over time to Qab Ilyas. Elias was an 8th-century muqaddam from Mount Lebanon, who was killed during a raid in the Beqaa Valley by the forces of the Abbasid governor of Damascus.

== History ==
After the fall of the Umayyad state in 749 (132 AH), the Abbasids were unable to win over the people of the Levant to their side, including the inhabitants of Mount Lebanon, because they were deprived of the advantages that they had during the Umayyad period. Moreover, the Abbasids treated the people of the Levant in general as treating the conquered countries during wars, so the Mardaites started a series of revolts, starting in 752 (135 AH), and led by one of their leaders “Elias” managed to defeat several armies sent by Caliph al-Mansur to Lebanon, and despite this, Elias was killed in the location known today in the name of “Qob Elias,” however, his companions continued their disobedience under the leadership of another leader named “Samaan,” who defeated the Abbasid armies and almost took over Homs and Hama through the aid that was coming to him by sea from the Byzantines.

In the late 16th century, the Bedouin chieftain of the Beqaa Valley, Mansur ibn Furaykh, used Qabb Ilyas as one of his headquarters. He had a palatial home built in the village. Two years after his execution in Damascus by the Ottoman authorities in December 1593, the Druze sheikh Ali Jumblatt took over the Beqaa Valley during his rebellion against the governor of Damascus Eyalet. During this rebellion, Mansur's home was seized by the Druze Ma'ani emir, Fakhr ad-Din II, who refused to restore it to Mansur's brother Murad ibn Furaykh despite an imperial Ottoman decree. The sons of Mansur, Nasrallah and Muhammad, continued to struggle for control of the property during Fakhr ad-Din's exile as the Shia Harfushi sheikh Yunus al-Harfush took possession of the home.

The Ma'an dynasty built a formidable fortress in Qabb Ilyas that later emirs of Lebanon commissioned during times of rebellion against the Ottomans. Sayyid-Ahmad Shihab occupied Qabb Ilyas in 1773 and robbed a group of Damascene merchants there, for which he was condemned and evicted from the area by his brother Emir Yusuf Shihab. In the mid-1820s, the Ottoman wali of Damascus, Darwish Pasha, defeated Emir Bashir Shihab II and proceeded to demolish most of what remained of the Fakhr ad-Din Castle. He then assigned a Muslim from the Aleppo-based Araqtanji family to govern Qabb Ilyas.

In 1838, Eli Smith noted Kubb Elyas as a Sunni Muslim, Druze, Maronite and Greek Catholic village in the Beqaa Valley.

During the 1860 Mount Lebanon civil war, the Druze used Qabb Ilyas, which at the time was a religiously mixed village, as their local headquarters in the Beqaa Valley and it withstood a raid by fighters from the nearby Christian stronghold Zahle. During French military intervention in the conflict, the French Army occupied Qabb Ilyas and maintained a military force there to guard the Beqaa Valley and southern Mount Lebanon. The Ottomans established an army garrison at Qabb Ilyas at the French withdrawal.

== Archaeological remains ==
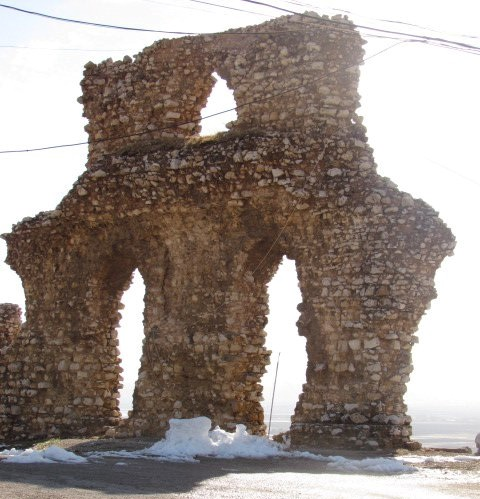
Prince Fakhreddin II Castle Ruins

The Fakhr ad-Din II Citadel in Qabb Ilyas - Wadi Al Doulom is believed to have been one of the largest Citadel in the Beqaa Valley. It is also thought to have been built by the Druze prince Fakhr ad-Din II, who chose the location for its elevation and defensibility against potential assaults by the Mamalik military. The citadel was eventually destroyed by the Ottomans, but the ruins remain.

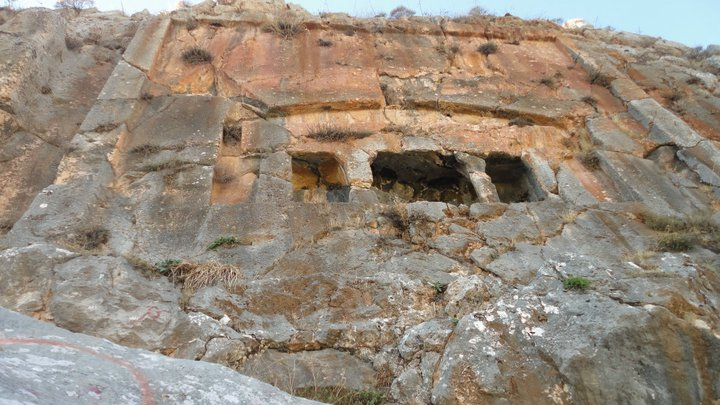
Haidara Ruins

The Haidara ruins are believed to date back to the Roman era.

== Local government ==
Qabb Ilyas is administered by an elected municipal council with six-year terms. It has administrative and financial independence, but remains under the control and supervision of the central government.

== Demographics ==
In 2014 Muslims made up 63.63% and Christians made up 36.13% of registered voters in Qabb Ilyas. 62.74% of the voters were Sunni Muslims, 14.92% were Maronite Catholics, 11.07% were Greek Orthodox and 8.90% were Greek Catholics.

It is estimated that Qabb Ilyas had a population of around 50,000 as of 2011. By 2013, as a result of the Syrian Civil War, about 18,000 Syrian refugees were living in Qabb Ilyas as well. The population lived in the following areas: Qabb Ilyas Fauka, Qabb Ilyas Tahta, Wadi El Delm, Farm of Bmahray, Bahsasa. In the 2004 municipal elections, it counted 14,602 registered voters, of which 8,771 voted.

There are no firm studies on the population of Qabb Ilyas in 2020 but it is believed to be around 100,000.

== Notables from Qabb Ilyas ==
- Eli El-Chantiry, Lebanese-Canadian politician
- Frank Lackteen, Lebanese-born American film actor

== Bibliography ==
- Abu Husayn, Abdul Rahim (2004). The View from Istanbul: Ottoman Lebanon and the Druze Emirate. I.B.Tauris. ISBN 9781860648564.
- Fawaz, L.T. (1994). An Occasion for War: Civil Conflict in Lebanon and Damascus in 1860. University of California Press. p. 125. ISBN 9780520200869. "Qabb Elias."
- Harris, William (2012). Lebanon: A History, 600–2011. OUP USA. ISBN 978-0-19-518111-1.
- Mishaqah, M. (1988). William McIntosh Thackston (ed.). Murder, Mayhem, Pillage, and Plunder: The History of the Lebanon in the 18th and 19th Centuries by Mikhayil Mishaqa (1800-1873). SUNY Press. ISBN 9780887067129.
- Robinson, E.; Smith, E. (1841). Biblical Researches in Palestine, Mount Sinai and Arabia Petraea: A Journal of Travels in the year 1838. Vol. 3. Boston: Crocker & Brewster.
