= Fitzroy Township =

Coordinates: 45°24′N 76°11′W

Fitzroy is a former incorporated and present day geographic township originally part of Carleton County in eastern Ontario, Canada.

Fitzroy was located in the western part of the county, bordered to the northeast by Torbolton Township, to the southeast by Huntley Township, to the southwest by Pakenham Township and to the northwest by the Ottawa River.

The township was established in 1823. The first permanent settler is believed to have been Charles Shirreff around 1818. Shirreff founded the settlement of Fitzroy Harbour in 1831. The township was an important centre of the timber trade during the 19th century. In 1974, the township was amalgamated with Huntley and Torbolton to form West Carleton. In 2001, West Carleton became part of the new city of Ottawa.

Fitzroy took its name from Sir Charles Augustus FitzRoy, son-in-law to Charles Lennox, 4th Duke of Richmond who was Governor General of British North America from 1818 to 1819.

According to the Canada 2016 Census, the Township had a population of 4,413. As of the Canada 2021 Census, this had increased to 4,616.

Villages within the township included:

- Fitzroy Harbour
- Galetta
- Kinburn
- Antrim

== Reeves ==
- 1850 J. Steen
- 1857 T. Elliott
- 1862 William Dean
- 1863 John Neil
- 1865 James Hubbell
- 1866 William Dean
- 1867 John Neil
- 1868 Allen Fraser
- 1872 John Neil
- 1878 Allan Fraser
- 1880 David MacLaren
- 1882 Charles Mohr
- 1896 A.E. Riddell
- 1897 n/a
- 1907 F.S. McClure
- 1909 Charles Mohr
- 1912 W. Boyle
- 1916 J.C. Greene
- 1918 T.B. Wilson
- 1922 R.G. Tripp
- 1929 John Shannon
- 1935 Stuart Craig
- 1940 V.E. Major
- 1959 Harvey E. Craig
- 1965 Hiram Wilson
- 1973 Jack Shaw

== See also ==
- List of townships in Ontario
