= Donald B. Munro =

Donald Baird "Don" Munro (ca. 1923 – 1984) was a dairy farmer and politician in Ontario. He served as mayor of West Carleton Township, Ontario from 1974 to 1977 and from 1982 to 1984.

He was diagnosed with cancer in January 1984 and underwent surgery but returned to hospital in October and died later that year.

Donald B. Munro Drive in Ottawa was named in his honour.

Preceded by new position	Mayors of West Carleton Township; 1974-1977	Succeeded by Frank Marchington
Preceded by Frank Marchington	Mayors of West Carleton Township; 1982-1984	Succeeded by Eric Craig
