= Clarke Kelly =

Canadian politician

Ottawa City Councillor
- Incumbent
- Assumed office November 15, 2022
- Preceded by: Eli El-Chantiry
- Constituency: West Carleton-March Ward

Deputy Mayor of Ottawa
- Incumbent
- Assumed office July 1, 2023 Serving with Glen Gower, Theresa Kavanagh

Personal details
- Born: 1987 (age 38–39) West Carleton Township
- Children: 1

Clarke Kelly (born 1987) is a Canadian politician. He is currently the city councillor for West Carleton-March Ward on Ottawa City Council. He was first elected in the 2022 Ottawa municipal election.

== Early life ==
Kelly grew up in Crown Point in West Carleton Township, living one door down from his current residence. He played youth ice hockey for the West Carleton Warriors and soccer for the West Carleton Talons. He attended elementary school at St. Michaels in Fitzroy Harbour and high school at West Carleton Secondary School. Kelly received a bachelor's degree in political science from Carleton University and a diploma in Communication and Media Studies from Algonquin College. Until June 2022, he worked on Parliament Hill for four years for two Liberal Members of Parliament, Karen McCrimmon and Ryan Turnbull.

== Career ==
West Carleton-March Ward's councillor Eli El-Chantiry announced he was not running for re-election in the 2022 Ottawa municipal election, leaving the seat open. During the election campaign, fixing roads was one of Kelly's top priorities. His other priorities included safe roads, supporting farms, sustainable development that is less destructive to natural habitats and more recreation facilities. In the election, Kelly narrowly won the seat, defeating Sasha Duguay, a legislative assistant to a Conservative MP by just over 200 votes, with 27% of the vote.

Following his election, Kelly was named Vice-Chair of the Agriculture and Rural Affairs Committee, and was named to the Built Heritage Committee, the Emergency Preparedness and Protective Services Committee, the Planning and Housing Committee, and the Committee of Revision. He was also named to the Ottawa Community Lands Development Corporation and Mississippi River Valley Conservation Authority.

Kelly's constituency assistant Lisa McGee is also the mayor of next-door Arnprior.

=== Daycare incident ===
In July 2024, Kelly got in a dispute with a daycare located next to his constituency office in Kinburn. According to Kelly, he had made several complaints to the daycare about "toys being left in doorways, messes in the washrooms and noise". In July 3 city planning meeting he was attended over Zoom, he claimed that children had been "banging on the window of his office, bouncing basketballs and screaming", which resulted in him 'politely' asking daycare staff to remove the toys. Following that, he had an altercation with staff in which profanity was exchanged. The dispute resulted in police being called.

Following the incident, dubbed the "kerfuffle in Kinburn", Ottawa's integrity commissioner recommend an official reprimand of Kelly, as his 'aggressive behaviour ... did not meet the standards expected of elected officials."
