= West Carleton Township =

Former Canadian municipality

Coordinates: 45°22′N 76°06′W

West Carleton
- Found in: Ontario
- Created by: January 1, 1974
- Abolished by: January 1, 2001
- Populations: 21,547
- Areas: 630.95km^{2}

West Carleton was a township municipality in Eastern Ontario, Canada. It was located in the rural parts of what is now the City of Ottawa, west of Kanata. Its northern boundary was the Ottawa River.

The township was created in 1974 with the amalgamation of three townships: Torbolton, Fitzroy, and Huntley. At the time, it had a population of about 8,000 and was the largest municipality in the province by area.

In 2001 it was amalgamated with Cumberland, Gloucester, Goulbourn, Kanata, Nepean, Osgoode, Ottawa, Rideau, Rockcliffe Park and Vanier to form the new city of Ottawa.

== Mayors ==
- 1974–1977: Donald B. Munro
- 1978–1982: Frank Marchington
- 1982–1984: Donald B. Munro
- 1984–1990: Eric Craig
- 1991–1994: Roland Armitage
- 1995–2001: Dwight Eastman
