= Working Class Culture and the Development of Hull, Quebec, 1800-1929 =

2006 nonfiction book

- Author: Michael Martin
- Language: English
- Subject: Labour history of Hull, Quebec
- Genre: Nonfiction
- Publisher: Algora Publishing
- Publication date: 2006
- Publication place: Gatineau, Quebec
- Pages: 270
- Website: www.algora.com/brand/michael-martin

Working Class Culture and the Development of Hull, Quebec, 1800-1929 is a 2006 history book by Michael Martin.

The book documents the history of industrialization in Hull, Quebec from the perspective of working class residents.

== Publication ==
The 2006 book was published in Gatineau, Quebec by Algora Publishing. It is written by Michael Martin.

The book was published digitally by Archive CD BooksCanada Inc. in 2015 (catalogue number CA0415) and has been available in digital format via Library and Archives Canada since 2006.

== Author ==
Author Michael Martin is a freelance writer with over 300 articles published in French and English. He was the French to English translator of Pierre-Louis Lapointe's 1990 book, published by the City of Buckingham, Buckingham, 1824–1990: In the Heart of the Lower Lièvre District, the City of Buckingham from Its Earliest Beginnings ISBN 978-2-921282-10-9.

Martin is resident of Hull, Quebec and has a 1974 bachelors degree in political science from Laurentian University and a 1975 masters degree in public administration from Queen's University, Kingston.

Martin has also written the 2017 book City of the Sun - Development and Popular Resistance in the Pre-Modern West ISBN 1628942797 and the 2007 book The Red Patch: A Story of Political Imprisonment in Hull, Quebec During WWII.

== Content and critical use ==
Working Class Culture and the Development of Hull, Quebec, 1800-1929 documents the history of Hull, Quebec from the perspective of working class members of the community. In the book Martin describes Hull as the first town in the Ottawa Valley and documents the history through the 19th and 20th century and its growth to become an industrialized modern city.

The book includes content about the logging, lumber, pulp and paper industries written from the perspectives of factory workers. The author notes how workers organised to create mutual aid societies, church groups, charities and sports teams. The book discusses how working class consciousness contributes to the development of trade unions and cooperatives and the importance of a nightlife in working class culture.

The book documents the community organizing of the workers to influence the direction of all levels of government. The book details the 1891 industrial action of lumber factory workers in the Chaudière industrial area the industrial action of women workers at the E. B. Eddy Company, then owned by R. B. Bennett. Notable figures featured in the book include Canadian lumber tycoon and railroad baron John Rudolphus Booth.

In a 2017 article in Turkish labour research journal Emek Araştırma Dergisi (ISSN: 1305-6182), sociologist Mustafa Kemal Coşkun cited Martin's book when discussing the relationship between working-class consciousness and the development of trade unions, cooperatives and political parties.

== See also ==
- Ottawa River timber trade
