= Philemon Island =

Native name: Île Philemon
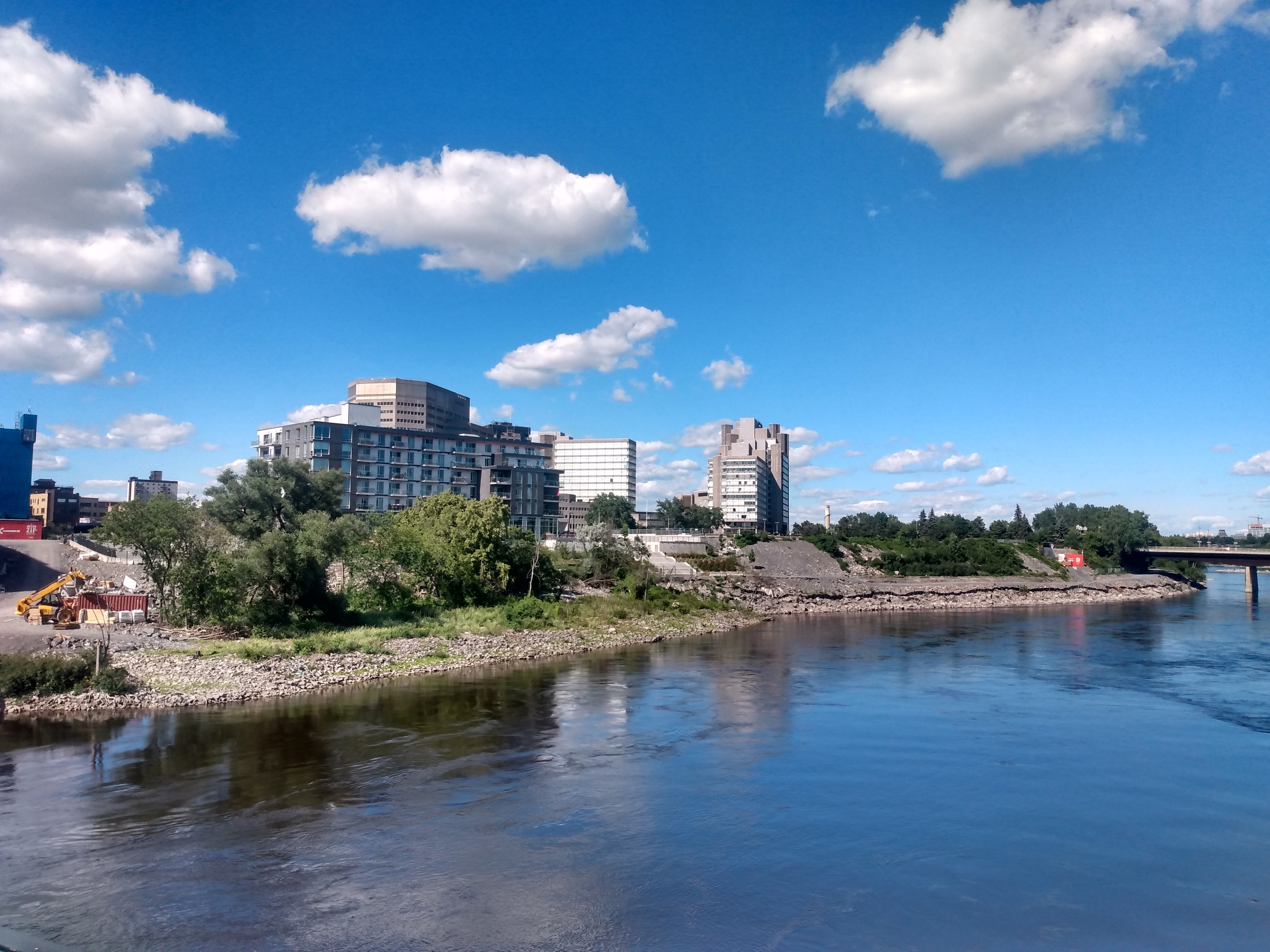

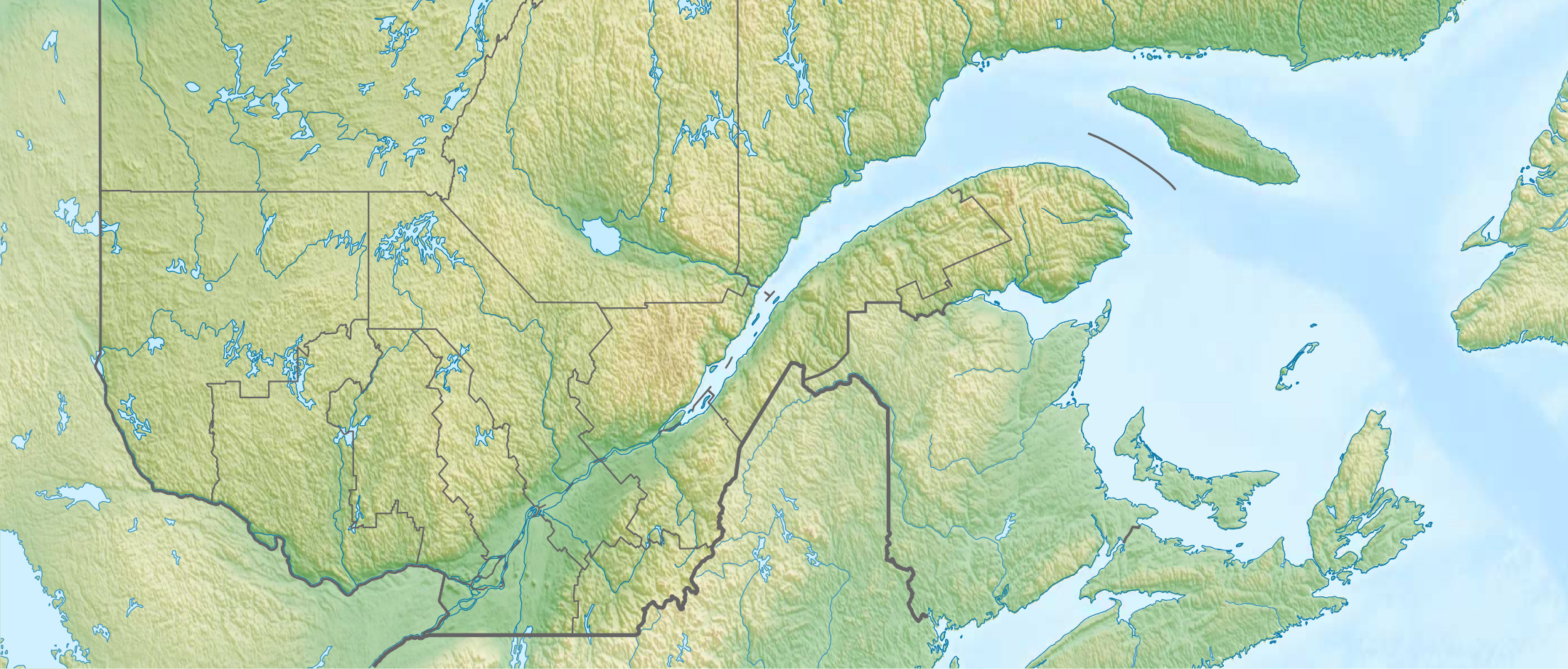
- Location within Quebec South
- Etymology: Philemon Wright

Geography
- Location: Ottawa River
- Coordinates: 45°25′24″N 75°43′01″W
- Length: 823 m (2700 ft)
- Width: 305 m (1001 ft)
- Highest elevation: 56 m (184 ft)

Administration
- Canada
- Province: Quebec
- Census Division: Gatineau
- District: Hull–Wright District

Philemon Island (French: Île Philemon) is a former artificial island in the Hull sector of Gatineau, Quebec, Canada. Currently part of the mainland, it was once an island in the Ottawa River, separated from the mainland by a timber slide for nearly 150 years. It was part of an archipelago of islands below Chaudière Falls, known as the "Chaudière Islands" that contain Victoria Island, Chaudière Island, Amelia Island and Albert Island. It is accessible via Rue Eddy and the Portage Bridge.

== History ==
Originally known as the "Peninsular Village", it became an island in 1829 when Ruggles Wright (son of Philemon, for whom the island is named) constructed a timber slide between the island and Hull in order to bypass the falls. The channel was used as a timber slide (known as the "Hull Crib Slide") until 1929.

Businessman Ezra Butler Eddy bought the island in 1870 and built a large sawmill there. The E. B. Eddy Company owned several industrial buildings on the island, which were taken over by Domtar in 1998 when it bought E. B. Eddy.

The channel between the island and the Hull mainland was filled in with "indifferent rubble" during the early 1970s.

In the late 2010s, the O Condominiums were built on the former island, as part of the larger Zibi development, an ongoing redevelopment project of the Chaudière Islands.
