= Daniel McLachlin =

Canadian politician

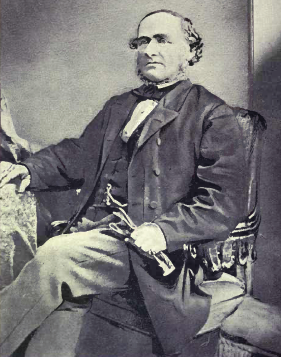

Member of the Canadian Parliament for Renfrew South
- In office 1867–1869
- Preceded by: Position established
- Succeeded by: John Lorn McDougall

Personal details
- Born: July 17, 1808 Pointe-Fortune, Vaudreuil County, Lower Canada
- Died: February 6, 1872 (aged 63) Arnprior, Ontario, Canada
- Party: Liberal

Daniel McLachlin (July 17, 1808 – February 6, 1872) was a businessman and political figure in Canada West. He represented Renfrew South in the 1st Canadian Parliament as a Liberal from 1867 to 1869.

== Early life and family ==
McLachlin was born in Pointe-Fortune in Lower Canada on 17 July 1808, to Hugh McLachlin and Janet (née McLean). He had many siblings; Mary (born 1795), Alexander (b. 1796), John (b. 1798), Flora (b. 1800), Janet (b. 1802), Dorothy (b. 1804), Ann (b. 1806), Catharine (b. 1810), William (b. 1813), Hugh (b. 1816), Sara (b. 1820), and Christina. The family lived in Argenteuil, Lower Canada.

McLachlin married Maria Harrington in 1837. They had eight children together; Jessie, William, Harriet, Hugh, John, Daniel, Eric, and Claude. The family moved to Arnprior in 1857.

== Career ==
Daniel entered the timber trade in the Ottawa Valley by November 1834 with his brother William. In 1837, McLachlin moved to Bytown and purchased cutting rights along the Ottawa River, Madawaska River and Indian Rivers. He built sawmills and gristmills at the Chaudière Falls on the Ottawa. He also operated a general store in Bytown with his brother Hugh until 1855.

In 1851, he relocated his timber business to the nearly deserted village of Arnprior, using the power of the Madawaska River to operate his mills. He also helped promote the development of the settlement there. He had bridges built, helped to bring people in, and took a leading role in promoting public improvements. Two of these involved the Madawaska River Improvement Association (later Company) and a wagon road on the Madawaska River from Arnprior to the Long Rapids. The same year, he was elected to the Legislative Assembly for Bytown; he did not run in 1854 but was elected in 1861 for Renfrew. By 1865, he was running the lumber business with his sons (Hugh, John, and Daniel) under the name "McLachlin Brothers."

In 1867, he was elected by acclamation to the 1st Canadian Parliament for Renfrew South. He resigned from politics and his business in 1869, leaving the business to his sons, who he'd brought into the business in 1865. He died in Arnprior on February 6, 1872.
