= Coat of arms of Gatineau =

Insignia of city in Quebec, Canada

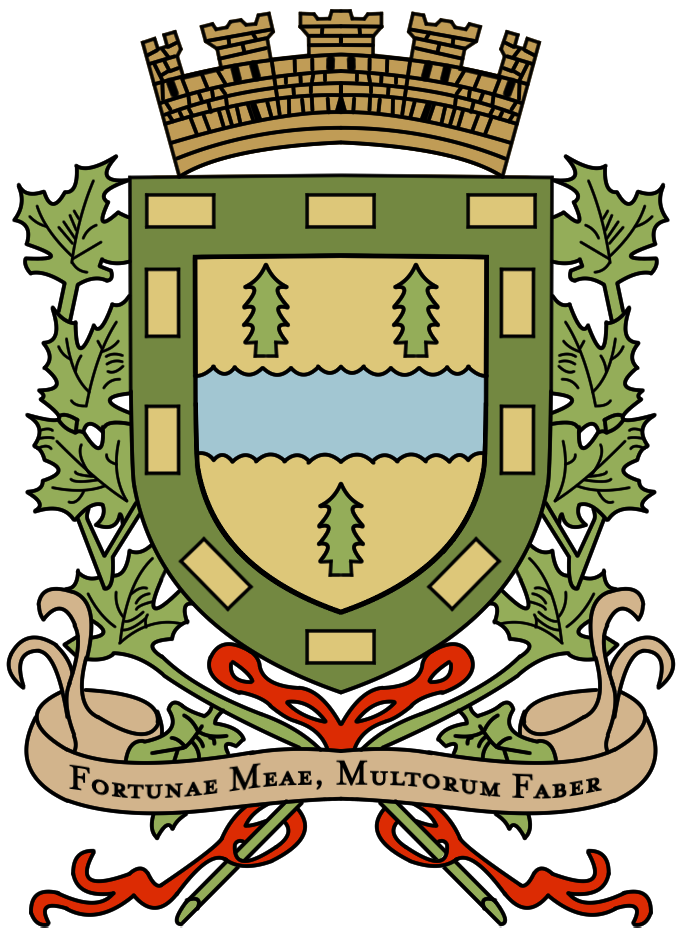
- Armiger: Gatineau
- Adopted: 1933 (College of Arms)
- Relinquished: 2002
- Crest: A château-fort
- Supporters: Stalks of maple leaf stems
- Compartment: A red string looped and wrapping around the stems of maple leaves
- Motto: FORTUNAE MEAE, MULTORUM FABER

The coat of arms of Gatineau was adopted after the College of Arms presented it to the municipality of Gatineau in 1933. It is not used since the 2002 amalgamation.

== Symbolism ==
Shield

The main element of the shield, the jagged blue fess, represents the Ottawa River. The three green fir trees represent the lumber industry that was during the Ottawa River timber trade, while the gold colour symbolizes the wealth and prosperity that came from the industry. The green bordure filled with gold billets is an ode to the bygone days of log driving along the Ottawa and Gatineau Rivers.

Motto

The motto, Fortunae meae, multorum faber, which directly translates to "Maker of my fate and that of many others," applies to the forest industry, which was the city's main industry, as well as to the work of many Gatineau residents.
