= Wright's Town, Lower Canada =

Historical settlement in present-day Gatineau, Quebec, Canada

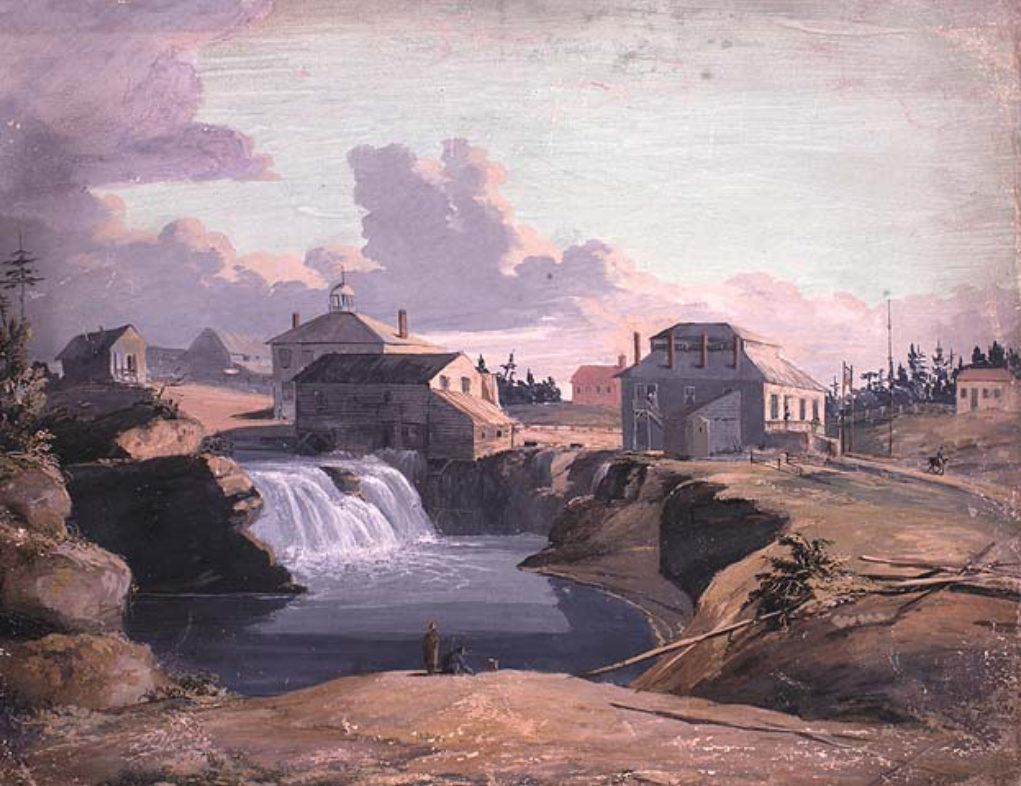
A painting of the mill and tavern in Wright's Town, 1823

Wright's Town, also known as Wrightstown, Wright's Village, and Columbia Falls Village, was the first permanent colonial settlement in the Ottawa Valley, located at the north edge of the Chaudière Falls on the Ottawa River, on the southern part of what is now known as Hull Island, in present-day Gatineau, Quebec, Canada. Wright's Town was established by and named after American settler Philemon Wright, who settled in the area in 1800.

Though nothing remains of Wright's Town, its growth and legacy spurred the development of other settlements in the Ottawa Valley, including the settlement of Bytown across the river, which would eventually develop into the city of Ottawa, Ontario, the national capital of Canada.

== History ==
Wright's Town was founded by Philemon Wright, an American from Woburn, Massachusetts. In 1799, Philemon acquired a land grant from the British Crown under the "leader and associates" regime for roughly a quarter of the land in the Township of Hull in Lower Canada.

Philemon and his family arrived in the Ottawa Valley on March 7, 1800, accompanied by four other families and 33 axemen and labourers. Along with Philemon's wife Abigail and six children, the other families included his brother Thomas with his wife Mary and their children; his two sisters-in-law, Margery and Lavina, with husbands Samuel Choate and John Allen, and their children; and free Black man London Oxford with his wife and possibly also their children. When Philemon arrived in 1800, he was accompanied by four other families and 33 axemen and labourers. Along with his wife Abigail and six children, the other families included his brother Thomas with his wife Mary and their children; his two sisters-in-law, Margery and Lavina, with husbands Samuel Choate and John Allen, and their children; and free Black man London Oxford with his wife and possibly also their children. Thomas Wright died in the first year of the settlement but within two years, the number of associates grew to twelve: Wright's sons Philemon and Tiberius; Harvey Parker; Daniel Wyman; Ephraim and Edmond Chamberlin; Luther Colton; James and William McConnell; and Isaac Remic.

The town was originally created to support the agricultural settlement that Philemon and his brother Thomas had planned to build, but with the 1806 launching of the Columbo, the first square timber raft floated on the Ottawa River, Wright's Town became the birthplace and centre of the Ottawa River timber trade.

The first two farms cleared in the settlement were the Gateno Farm in 1800 and the Columbia Falls Farm in 1801, the former named after the Gateno River and the latter named after the Columbia Falls, the name Philemon gave to the Chaudière Falls. The Wrights used the Columbia Falls name frequently, to the point that they referred to the town as "Columbia Falls Village"; however, the name never caught on with the others, who named the settlement Wright's Town (alternatively Wrightstown) or Wright's Village. Contrary to popular belief, the town was never called "Wrightsville" or "Wrightville", a name originating from the later Wrightville neighbourhood of Hull.

For its first 26 years of existence, Wright's Town was the centre of commerce, industry, and agriculture in the Ottawa Valley. It was the settlement from which a majority of the other Ottawa Valley settlements grew. The towns of Aylmer, Chelsea, and Wakefield in Quebec, and Richmond and Bytown in Ontario, developed and grew as a result of the influence of Wright's Town.

In 1826, when the Crown decided to build the Union Bridge (now the Chaudière Bridge) and the Rideau Canal, the site of Wright's Town was used as a staging ground for its construction.

Wright's Town was eventually developed into the city of Hull, Quebec, incorporated in 1875.

== The town ==
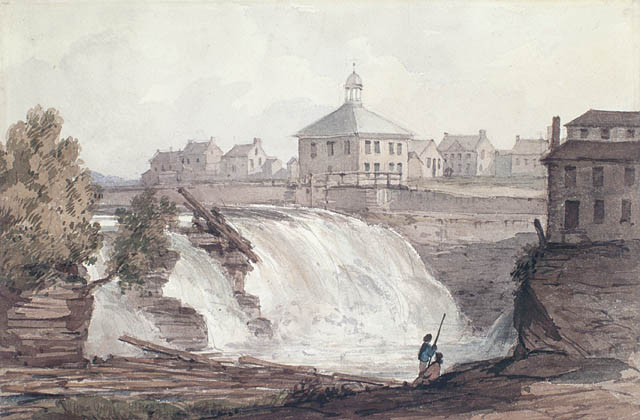
The whitewashed stone building in Wright's Town, seen above the Chaudière Falls, 1851

The town grew around the common, borrowing its design from the many New England towns where Philemon and the other first settlers grew up. The common included New England fixtures, such as a meeting house, a tavern, and stores. The meeting house served both political and religious functions.

The Upper Village was the site of the town's hotel, mills, foundry, bakehouse, tannery, and several shops. The Lower Village was closer to the steamboat wharf downriver, and it would only be laid out just before construction of the Rideau Canal, in 1826.

One of the most notable buildings in Wright's Town was a whitewashed stone building with a cupola, built in 1819. It was central in the Wright's Town common, and was thus prominently visible in most contemporary depictions. It appears to have had numerous owners or functions over the years, being identified as "Wright's Tavern" in 1823, the "New Stone Store" in 1824, the "Office & Store" in 1844, and as the town's meeting house by Joseph Bouchette, Surveyor General of Lower Canada.

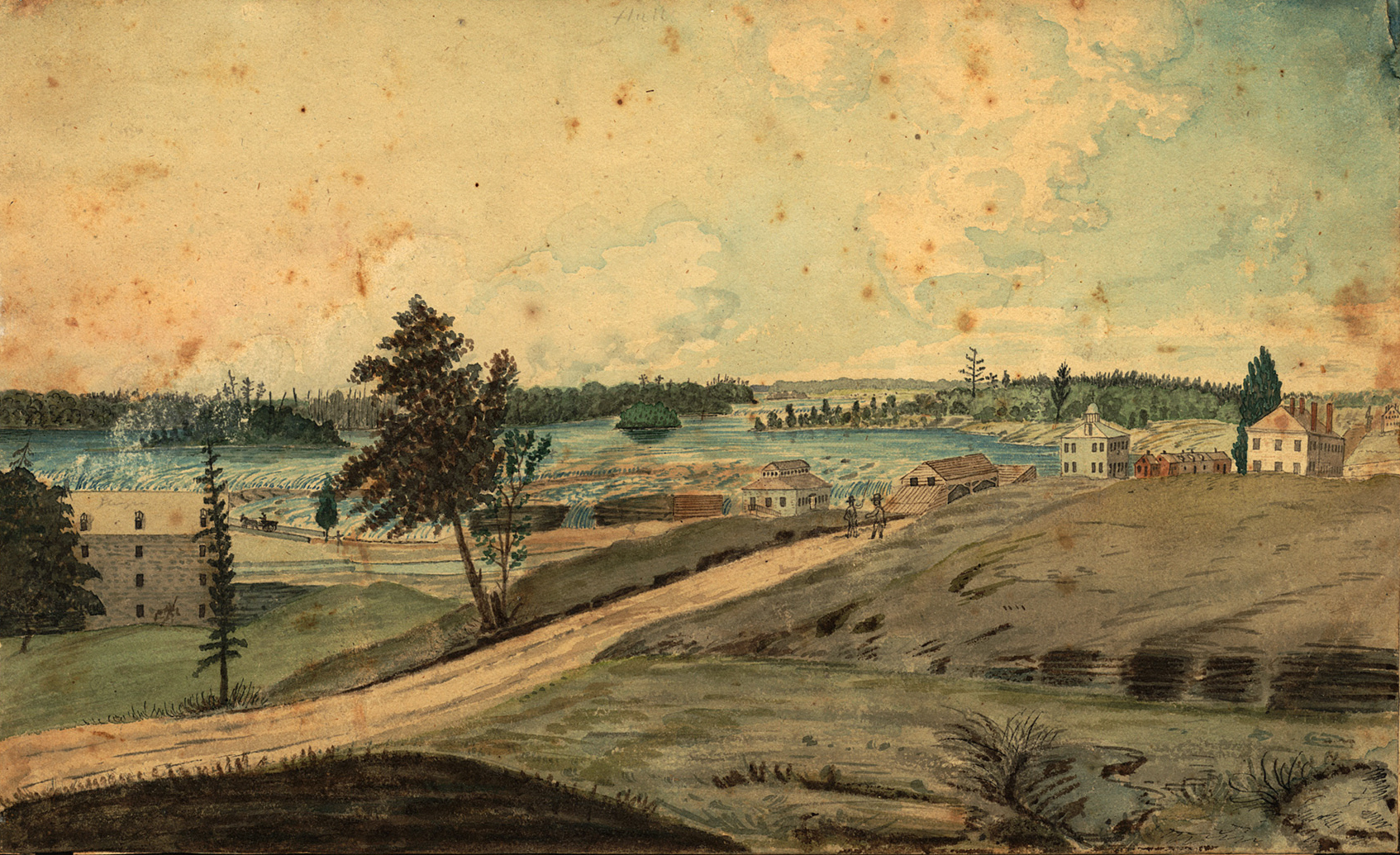
A painting of Hull and the Chaudière Falls in 1830 by Thomas Burrowes. Bytown, in its infancy, can be seen across the Ottawa River.

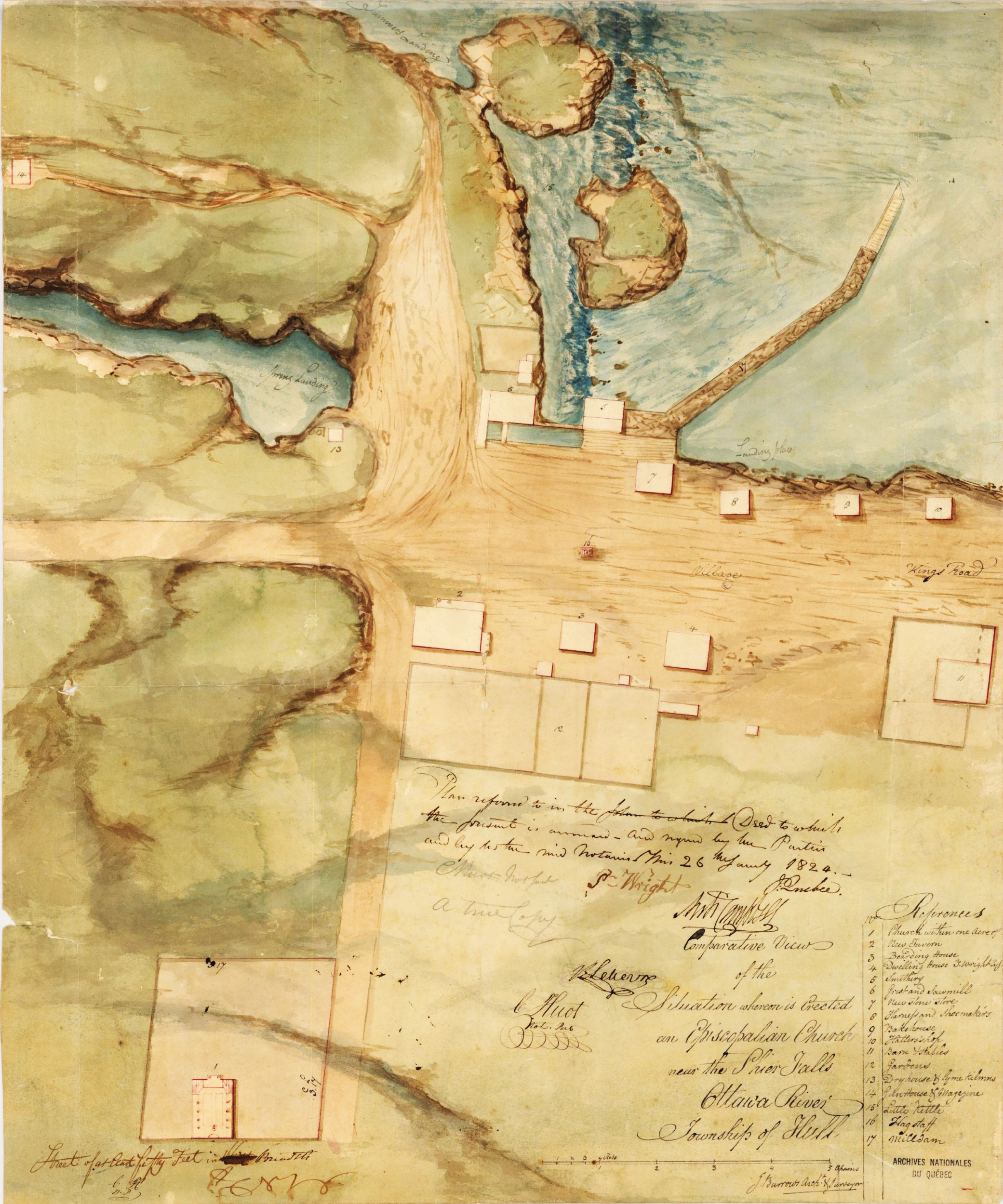
A map of Wright's Town in 1824 by John Burrows

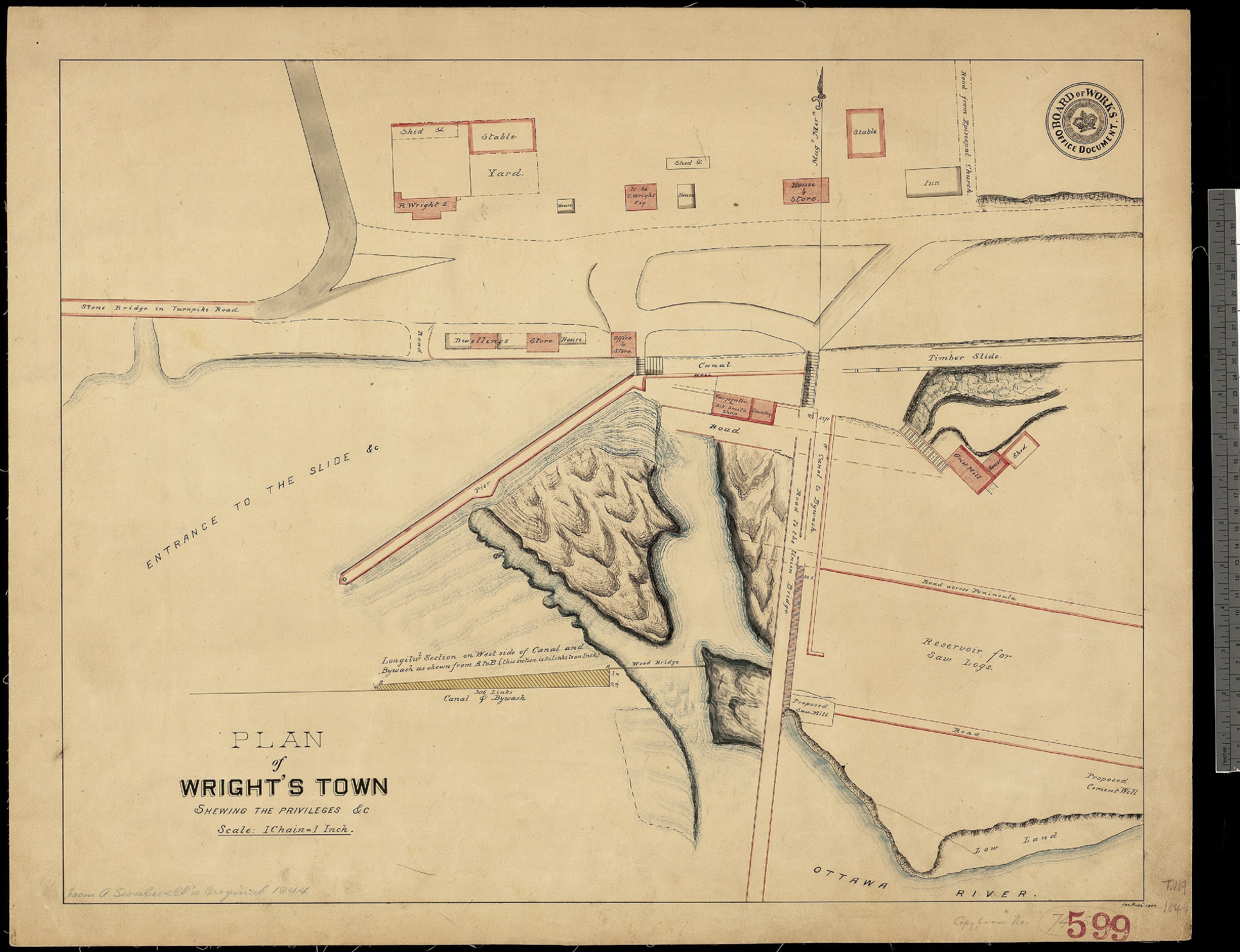
A plan of Wright's Town in 1844

== Today ==
Wright's Town developed into the city of Hull, Quebec, which was incorporated in 1875 and has been a sector of the city of Gatineau since a major amalgamation in 2002.

Nothing remains of the original 1800 settlement; the downtown Vieux-Hull sector was razed by a destructive fire in 1900, which also destroyed the original Union Bridge.

The name of Wright's Town was preserved in Wrightville, a neighbourhood in Hull and now modern-day Gatineau, located on the west side of Hull Island up to the Lac-des-Fées promenade.
