= Ruggles Wright =

Canadian lumber merchant (1793–1863)

Ruggles Wright (1793 – August 18, 1863) was a Canadian lumber merchant, the second youngest son of Philemon Wright.

He was born in Woburn, Massachusetts but moved to Canada with his parents while still young. He later joined the family business in the timber trade. Wright also served as justice of the peace and postmaster during the 1820s. In 1829, he built the first timber slide on the Ottawa River to transport logs past the Chaudière Falls, creating Philemon Island. However, by 1840, a competing slide built on the opposite (Ontario) side of the river had won over most of the business. He also took on management of the family cement manufactory and greatly expanded it during the construction of the Rideau Canal.

Wright was married twice: first to Hannah Chamberlain and later to Rosina McDowell. His daughter Hannah, married Joseph Merrill Currier, a lumber baron, in 1868. His son William McKay Wright served in the Canadian House of Commons.

In partnership with John Egan, he operated steamships transporting goods on the Ottawa River.
