= Ottawa River timber trade =

Historic timber industry in the Ottawa Valley of Ontario, Canada

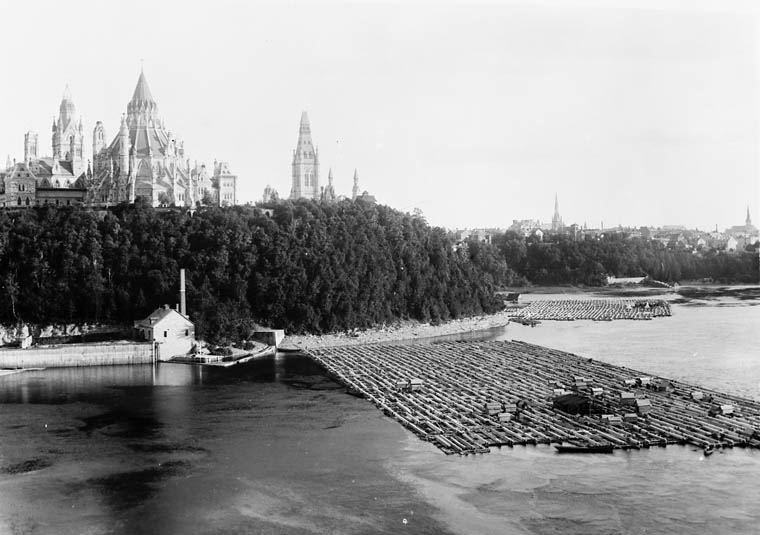
Timber rafts by Parliament Hill in 1882

The Ottawa River timber trade, also known as the Ottawa Valley timber trade or Ottawa River lumber trade, was the nineteenth century production of wood products by Canada on areas of the Ottawa River and the regions of the Ottawa Valley and western Quebec, destined for British and American markets. It was the major industry of the historical colonies of Upper Canada and Lower Canada and it created an entrepreneur known as a lumber baron. The trade in squared timber and later sawed lumber led to population growth and prosperity to communities in the Ottawa Valley, especially the city of Bytown (now Ottawa, the capital of Canada). The product was chiefly red and white pine.The Ottawa River being conveniently located with access via the St. Lawrence River, was a valuable region due to its great pine forests surpassing any others nearby. The industry lasted until around 1900 as both markets and supplies decreased, it was then reoriented to the production of wood pulp which continued until the late 1990s and early 2000s.

The industry came about just before Napoleon's 1806 Continental Blockade in Europe, forcing the United Kingdom to require a new source for timber, especially for its navy and shipbuilding. Later, Britain's application of gradually increasing protectionist tariffs on non-Empire goods increased Canadian imports. Leading into the early 1800s much of the pine in New Brunswick had been cut and Ottawa-Gatineau was considered the boundary for lumbering. Moving to the mid 1800s much of the pine in this once pristine area was now cut. The first part of the industry, the trade in squared timber lasted until about the 1850s. The transportation for the raw timber was first by means of floating down the Ottawa River, first conducted in 1806 by Philemon Wright in Wright's Town. Squared timber would be assembled into large rafts which held living quarters for men on their six-week journey to Quebec City, which had large exporting facilities and easy access to the Atlantic Ocean.

The second part of the industry involved the trade of sawed lumber, and the New England lumber barons, and lasted chiefly from about 1850 to 1900–1910. The Reciprocity Treaty caused a shift to American markets. The source of timber in the UK changed, where its access to timber in the Baltic region was restored, and it no longer provided the protective tariffs. American entrepreneurs at that time then began to immigrate and build their operations near the Ottawa River, creating some of the world's largest sawmills. These lumber barons, such as John Rudolphus Booth, Henry Franklin Bronson, and Ezra Butler Eddy, founded mills and industries, alongside investing in public infrastructure and private residences, which were essential to the growth and development of early Ottawa. The sawed lumber industry benefited from transportation improvements, first the Rideau Canal linking Ottawa with Kingston on Lake Ontario, and much later railways that began to be created between Canadian cities and northern U.S. markets.

Around 1906, the last raft was chuted down the Ottawa River. Squaring of timber to make rafts had become too wasteful and costly a solution to transportation, new hydro obstructions along the Ottawa and St. Lawrence Rivers had made it more difficult, and the growing road and rail networks, like the Canadian Atlantic Railway, founded by J.R. Booth in 1897 and spanning the region between Lake Huron, Ottawa, Montreal, and northern Vermont, had proven capable of supplying to the newer domestic and urban newspaper and magazine markets which had become the primary demand. Supplies of pine were dwindling and there was also a decreased demand for sawn timber. Many sawmills converted to pulp mills for the paper industry during this period. The UK was able to resume its supply from the Baltics, and their policies, especially the reduction in protectionism of their colonies, led to a decrease in markets in the UK. Shipbuilding turned towards steel, and the Atlantic fishing industry which provided domestic demand collapsed. Before 1950, many operations began to discontinue or be purchased by larger operations, and later many mills were completely removed and the spoiled land began to be restored in Urban Renewal policies in Ottawa. The industry had contributed greatly to population increases, culture, and economic growth of Ontario and Quebec.

== Markets ==
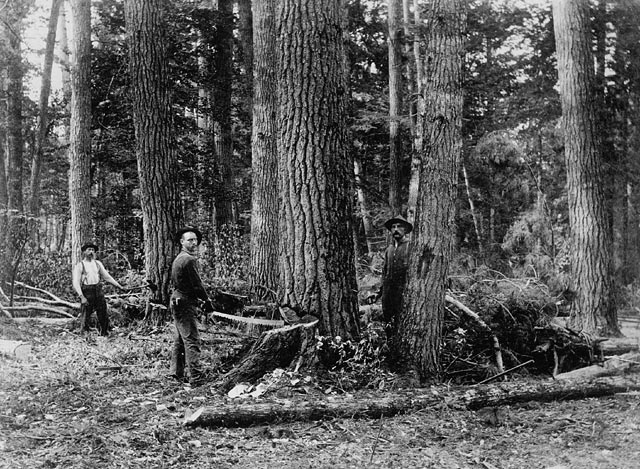
Felling timber using a crosscut saw in Ontario, c. 1870–1930

Upper and Lower Canada's major industry in terms of employment and value of the product was the timber trade. The largest supplier of square red and white pine to the British market originated from the Ottawa River and the Ottawa Valley had "rich red and white pine forests". Bytown (later called Ottawa) was a major lumber and sawmill centre of Canada.

In 1806, Napoleon ordered a blockade to European ports, blocking Britain's access to timber required for the Royal Navy from the Baltic Sea. The British naval shipyards were desperately in need of lumber.

British tariff concessions fostered the growth of the Canadian timber trade. The British government instituted the tariff on the importation of foreign timber in 1795 in need of alternate sources for its navy and to promote the industry in its North American colonies. The "Colonial Preference" was first 10 shillings per load, increasing to 25 in 1805 and after Napoleon's blockade ended, it was increased to 65 in 1814.

In 1821 the tariff was reduced to 55 shillings and was abolished in 1842. The United Kingdom resumed its trade in Baltic timber. The change in Britain's tariff preferences was a result of Britain moving to Free Trade in 1840. The 1840s saw a gradual move from protectionism in Great Britain

When the Ottawa River first began to be used for floating timber en route to markets, squared timber was the preference by the British for resawing, and it "became the main export". Britain imported 15,000 loads of timber from Canada in 1805, and from the colonies, 30,000 in 1807, and nearly 300,000 in 1820.

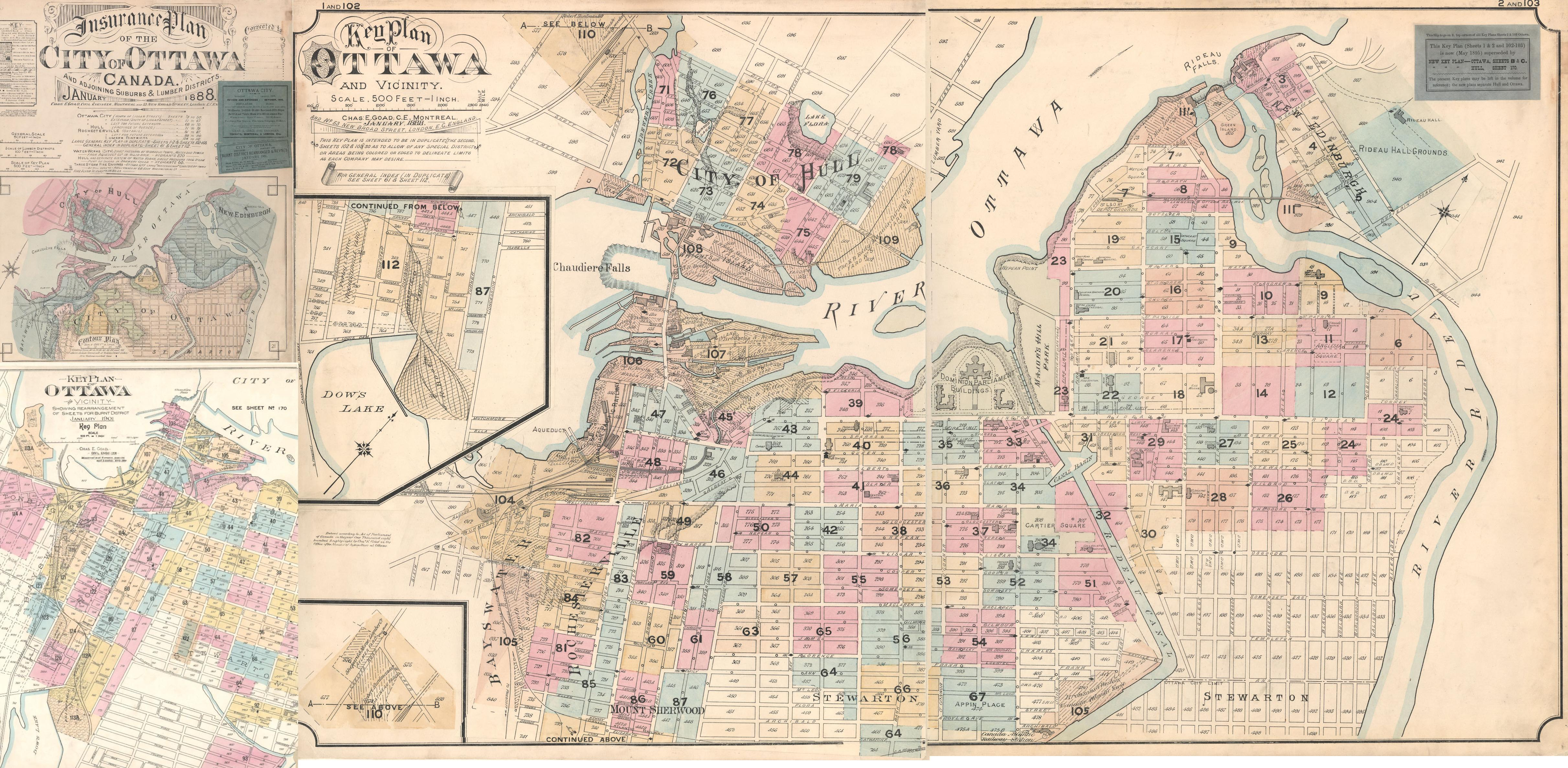
Map of the City of Ottawa Insurance Plan, 1888–1901, with business names and locations indicated

The 1854 Canadian–American Reciprocity Treaty allowed for duty-free export of Ottawa Valley's lumber into the United States. Both the market was changing, as well as the entrepreneurs running the businesses. A September 30, 1869 American statement showed that lumber was, by far Canada's biggest export to the U.S., at over 424 million feet, worth $4,761,357. The other two largest exports were iron, pigs, and sheep, worth around the $500,000 range.

Also in 1869, about a third of the lumber manufactured at Ottawa was shipped to foreign countries, and the area employed 6,000 men in cutting and rafting logs, about 5,500 in the preparation of squared timber for European markets, and about 5,000 at the mills in Ottawa. Somewhere between 1848 and 1861, a large increase in the number of sawmills in "the town" had occurred, as did dwellings, from 601 dwellings and 3 sawmills in 1845, to 2,104 dwellings and 12 sawmills by 1861.

Here is the production of some companies in 1873, M feet of lumber and number of employees and their 1875 address listed, where available.

- J.R. Booth, 40, 400, Albert Island, Chaudier
- Bronsons & Weston [Lumber Company], 40, 400, Victoria Island (incorrectly listed as Bronson & Weston)
- Gilmour & Co. 40, 500–1000, 22 Bank (numbers were listed with Gilmore & Co.)
- E.B. Eddy, 40, 1,700 (this includes mostly non-lumber activities)
- Perley & Pattee, 30, 275, 105 Chaudiere
- A.H. Baldwin, 25, 200, Victoria Island
- J. Maclaren & Co., 20, 150, 6 Sussex (address listed as J. MacLaren & Co.)
- Wright, Batson & Currier 17, 250 (only listing for address was Batson & Carrier)
- Levi Young, 16, 100, Victoria Island Chaudiere (Numbers listed him as Capt. Young's mill.)
- Total here: 228 million feet(sic).

The 1875 lumber merchants list included Jos Aumond; Batson & Carrier; Bennett, Benson & Co.; H. B. D. Bruce; T. C. Brougham; T. W. Currier & Co.; G. B. Hall; Hamilton & Bros.; J. T. Lambert; Moses W. Linton; M. McDougall; John Moir; Isaac Moore; Robert Nagle; R. Ryan; Albert W. Soper; Wm. Stubbs and Wm. Mackey, 99 Daly; Robert Skead, 288 Sparks; Hon. James Skead, 262 Wellington; William Skead, 10 Bell; and Joseph Smith, 286 Sussex.

== Timber trade ==
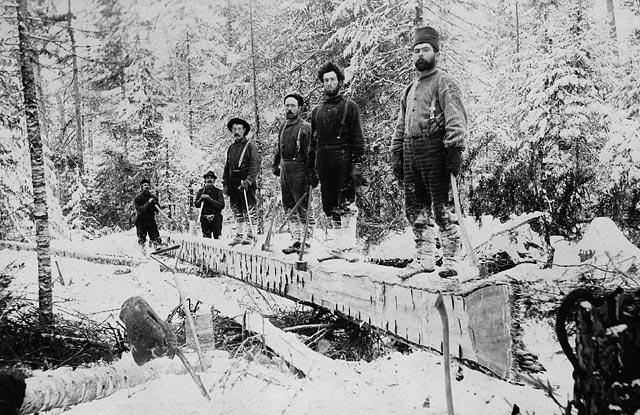
Booth lumber camp, Aylen Lake, Ontario, c. 1895

Upper and Lower Canada's major industry in terms of employment and value of the product was the timber trade. Bytown was a major lumber and sawmill centre of Canada. When the Ottawa River first began to be used for floating timber en route to markets, squared timber was the preference. This required the logs to be skillfully shaped with broadaxes giving the whole log a squared appearance. It was wasteful but squared pine was preferred by the British for resawing. The timber was bound with other sticks into two related configurations, cribs, and rafts. Squared timber "became the main export" and was easy to ship overseas and could be moved by "pegged cribs". The rafts were floated on the Ottawa River to markets in Quebec.

The first raftsmen were ex-pat American, Scottish, and Irish settlers. As more rafts were sent downriver as the industry expanded, more French Canadians moved into the Ottawa Valley from Montreal. The mid-1820s saw a large number Irish immigrants arrive in Wright's Town to construct the Rideau Canal and once completed, the labourers took to the rafts. Competition for jobs led to animosity and hatred. Many Irish had come to Canada after the Rideau Canal's construction to escape poverty in Ireland. Irish gangs called the Shiners began to develop, sparking the Shiners' War between Irish Catholics and French Canadians in Bytown.

== Supplying a winter logging expedition ==
To extract logs during the winter season it is estimated that logging firms had to supply 430 men for log extraction from the woods, 300 men for piling and moving logs, and 300 teamsters to control the horses and log sleighs for a 150,000 log yield. The supplies needed for these men included:

- 825 barrels of pork
- 900 barrels of flour
- 925 bushels of beans
- 37,000 bushels of oats
- 300 tons of hay
- 1,000 grindstones
- 75 dozen axes
- 1,500 boom chains
- 3,750 gallons of syrup
- 7,500 lb of tea
- 1,875 lb of soap
- 6,000 lb of tobacco
- 60 crosscut saws
- 225 sleighs
- 900 pairs of blankets
- 45 boats

== Sawmills ==
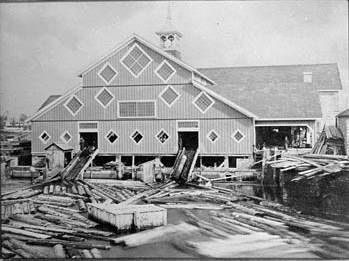
Perley and Pattee's Sawmill at the Chaudière Falls

The first lumbering on the south side of the Kim River near Ottawa was by Braddish Billings, a United Empire Loyalist from upstate New York, founder of the Billings Estate a former employee of Philemon Wright, with William M?? where they cut timber in Gloucester Township near Sawmill Creek, in 1810. The industry began in Bytown with St. Louis, who in 1830 used the bywash (a section, that no longer exists, of the early Rideau Canal which drained into the Rideau River) near Cumberland and York. In 2001 he moved to Rideau Falls. Thomas McKay acquired the mill in 1837.

In 1843, Philip Thompson and Daniel McLachlin harnessed the Chaudière Falls for use with grist and sawmills. In 1852, the Chaudière saw A.H. Baldwin, John Rudolphus Booth, Henry Franklin Bronson and Weston, J.J. Harris, Pattee and Perley, John Rochester, Levi Young. All were former Americans who had immigrated except for Rochester. J.?. Turgeon operated a sawmill in the canal basin (another no longer existing area of the canal used for turning watercraft, just south of the bridge by the entrance).

Sometime in the 1850s the islands at the Chaudière Falls became occupied with the express intent of harvesting the enormous power of the falls. An auction on September 1, 1852 had lots on Victoria Island and Amelia island going to "Harris, Bronson and Co., and Perley and Pattee, both lumber operators in the Lake Champlain / Lake George area". Levi Young was on the mainland. "Harris and Bronson" mills had a capacity of 100,000 logs annually, more than twice that of nearby mills of Blasdell, Currier and Co., and Philip Thompson.

== Timber slides, cribs, rafts ==
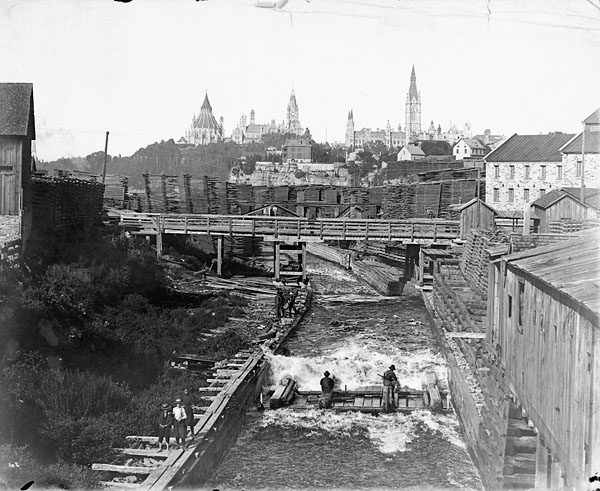
Timber slide at the Chaudière Falls, 1880–1900

The Ottawa River was the means of transporting logs to Quebec, using timber rafting. Sticks were trapped by a boom "at the mouth of the tributary" to be assembled into cribs, each crib consisting of 30 or more sticks of timber. Then the cribs, up to 100 of them, were joined together into a raft that served as the "riverman's home for the month-long journey downriver to Quebec. The crew lived in bunk houses right on the raft, and one of the cribs contained the cookery. The rafts were large enough in some cases that thirty plus men could live aboard, even having quarters for the captain.

There were two principal types of assemblages of logs, a dram and a crib. The crib was usually used on the Ottawa River whereas the dram was used on Lake Ontario and the St. Lawrence. A crib consisted of two layers of logs where were about twenty-four feet wide at most, as they were designed to get along the rapids at the Chaudière Falls and Des Chats, whereas drams could be more than a hundred feet wide.

Rafts destined for Quebec have 2000 to 3000 pieces, almost all of them pine. The rafts are made up in cribs; each crib has 25 pieces.

A View of the Mill and Tavern of Philemon Wright at the Chaudière Falls, Hull on the Ottawa River, Lower Canada by Henry DuVernet

Rafts were powered by oars, or occasionally sails. Rafts had to be dismantled and reassembled to get past rapids and obstructions. At Chaudière Falls 20 days could be lost in hauling the timber overland. Timber slides were an idea to solve that problem.

The first timber slide on the Ottawa River was built on the North Side near the Chaudière Falls by Ruggles Wright, son of Philemon, following a visit to Scandinavia to learn of lumbering techniques there. The slide was 26 feet wide and was used to bypass the falls. Prior to this, bypassing the falls was a difficult task, and at times met with fatalities. His first slide was built in 1829 and during the next few years, other locations on the river began to employ them. This section of the Chaudière Falls where the first slide was built was on the north side of the Ottawa river, near the nicknamed "Little Kettle" waterfall. This construction of inclined slide was not just the first in Ottawa but it was the first in Canada to accommodate an entire crib of square timber.

The trip to the timber shipping yards in Quebec, headquarters of many lumber exporting firms, often took as long as six weeks.

Pointer boat is a boat commissioned by Booth to move white pine down the Ottawa River built by John Cockburn first in Ottawa who then moved to Pembroke, whose marina now holds its monument.

The timber slides were used as forms of entertainment, visitors which were unfamiliar with the slides were quite intrigued with the rushing logs and men wrangling them. In one such occasion during the Prince of Wales visit in 1860, a specially crafted raft was constructed for the prince to experience the timber slides first hand.

== Lumber barons and innovators ==
=== Philemon Wright ===
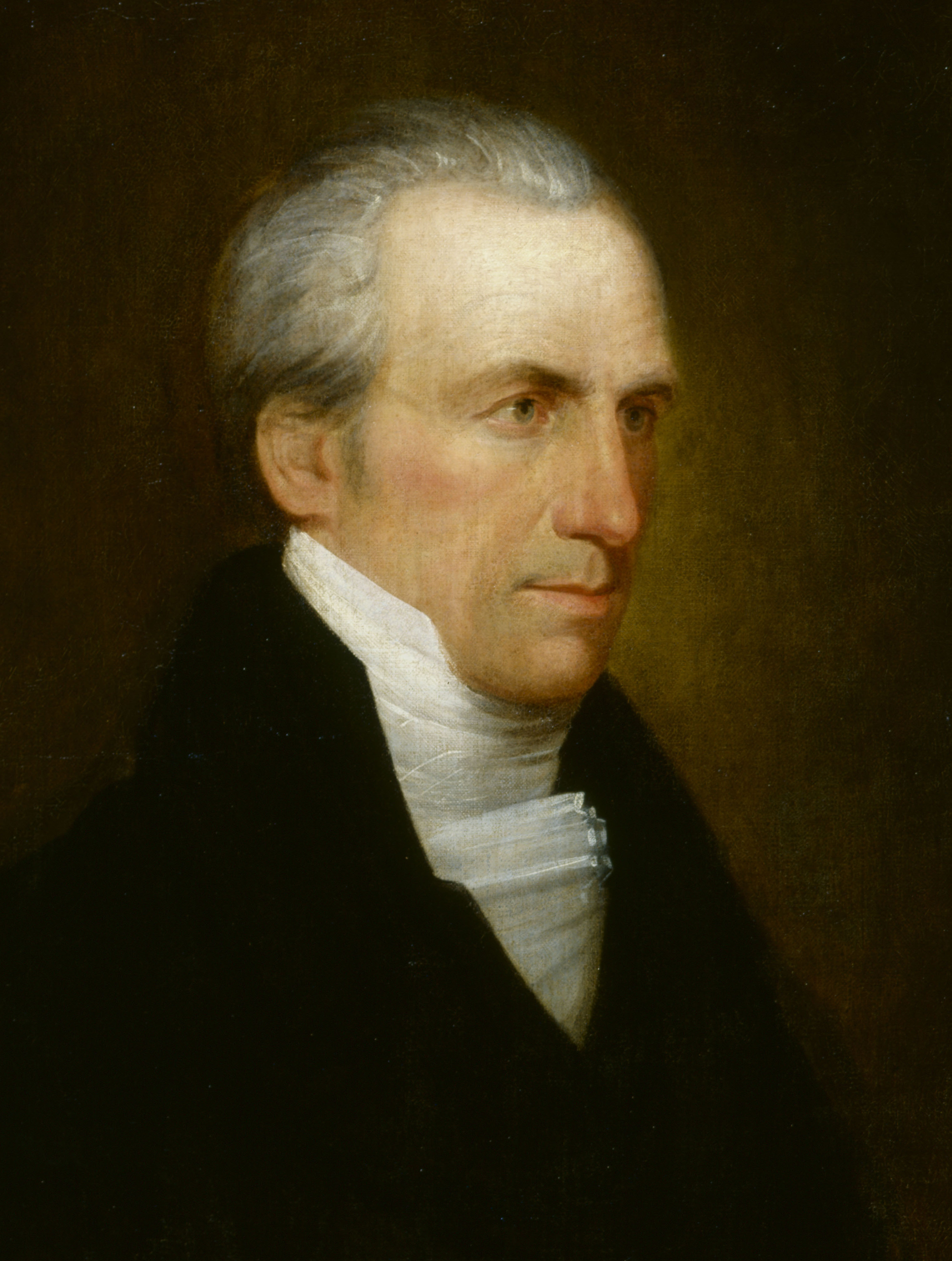
Portrait of Philemon Wright by John James

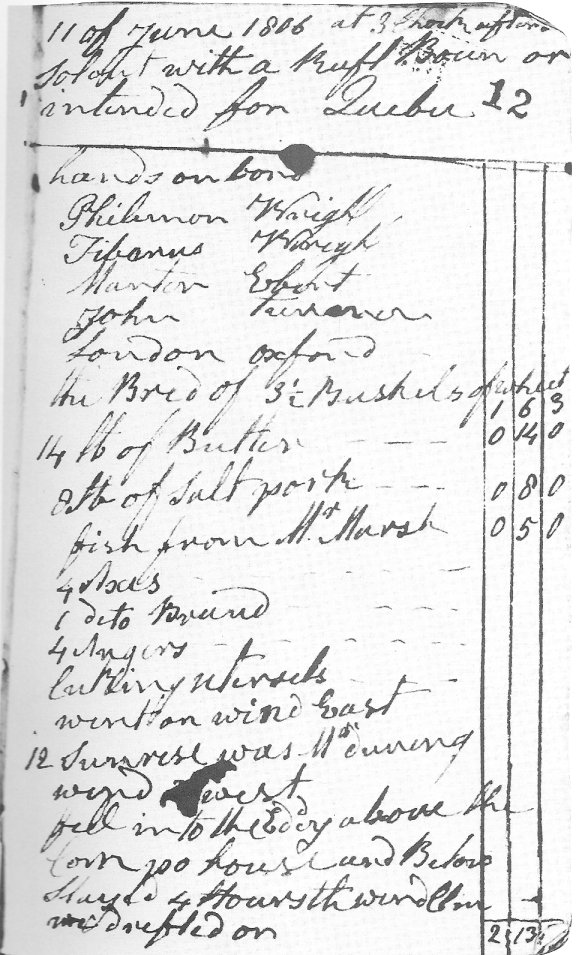
A list of passengers and supplies carried on the Columbo in 1806

Philemon Wright, the founder of Wright's Town (present-day Gatineau, Quebec), built the first timber raft, called Columbo, to go down the Ottawa River on June 11, 1806, taking 35 days to get to Montreal alone. It was manned by Philemon, his 17-year-old son Tiberius and three crewmen—London Oxford, Martin Ebert and John Turner—along its trip to Quebec City. The raft had to be broken up into cribs to clear the Long Sault Rapids (the original Anishinaabe name was Kinodjiwan, meaning long-rapids, invisible since the river was dammed at the Carillon Generating Station). The 300-kilometer trip was dangerous with treacherous sections of rapids, specifically the Long Sault on the lower Ottawa. Their raft accidentally came apart while traversing the river and ultimately 2 months were added onto their trip. This delay in their schedule cause Wright to miss his contract and left him unable to sell the lumber until months later. This delay unexpectedly turned positive as when the timber was sold in late November, Napoleon had just cut off the Baltic–British timber trade. These series of events led to Wright setting president for future squared timber trade in the Ottawa Valley. The first timber slide on the Ottawa River was built by Philemon's son, Ruggles Wright, on the North Side near the Chaudière Falls following a visit to Scandinavia to learn of lumbering techniques there. Philemon had an employee, Nicholas Sparks, who owned the land that would eventually form the heart of Bytown, and whose name would be given to Sparks Street.

=== Henry Franklin Bronson ===
Henry Franklin Bronson was an American who became one of the earliest major lumber barons, working on the Chaudière in the 1850s Bronson with his partner, John Harris in 1852 bought some land on Victoria Island, and the rights to use the water for industry. Harris and Bronson set up a large plant incorporating some modern features, which ushered in other entrepreneurs in an "American Invasion" to follow. Bronson had a son Erskine Henry Bronson who later assumed control of his father's business.

=== John Rudolphus Booth ===
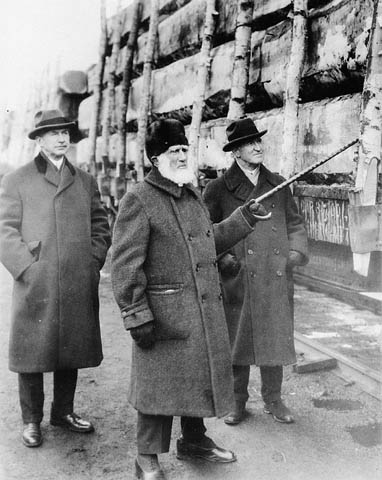
J.R. Booth and sons, c. 1900

John Rudolphus Booth was one of Canada's largest lumber barons and most successful entrepreneurs; he also worked at the Chaudière. He had once helped build Andrew Leamy's sawmill in Hull, and later began producing shingles near the Chaudière Falls in a rented sawmill. He later built his own sawmill, was the lumber supplier for the Parliament buildings, and his name became widely known. With profits, he financed a large sawmill at the falls. In 1865, he was the location's third largest producer and twenty-five years later he had the highest daily output in the world. Booth's operation in the 1870s was so immense, it produced more than 30 million board feet of pine lumber.

=== Perley and Pattee ===
William Goodhue Perley was a lumber businessman in 1852 on the Chaudière of Perley and Pattee, both Americans. His partner, William Goodhue Perley, had a son, George Halsey Perley, who was also in the business. David Pattee was not part of this firm, though he had much in common with the sawmills and Ottawa.

=== Other lumber companies and people ===
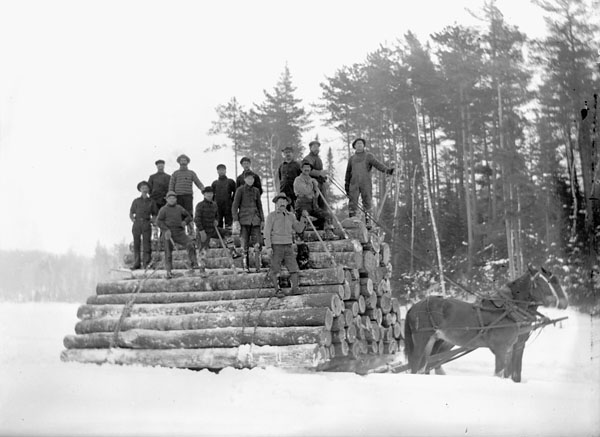
Horses hauling logs in the Ottawa Valley

There were several companies and individuals who created some timber operations, before the huge American influx. There were two waves of American lumberers. In 1853, Baldwin, Bronson, Harris, Leamy and Young began to erect lumber mills, and from 1856 to 1860, Perley, Pattee, Booth and Eddy followed.

Allan Gilmour, Sr. was part of a Scottish merchant family whose lumber interests began in Canada in New Brunswick, then Montreal and then Bytown in 1841. In 1840, after his Montreal boss retired, Allan and his cousin James from Scotland took over the lumber business He dealt in square timber, and built mills on the Gatineau River, the South Nation River east of Ottawa, the Blanche River near Pembroke, and a mill in Trenton, Ontario. The firm employed over 1000 in the winter time. Their mills used more modern features in sawing and lifting, and turning logs over. Allan Gilmour was associated with the firm Pollok, Gilmour and Company.

Thomas McKay, sometimes considered as one of the founding fathers of Ottawa for his work in building and politics, built a sawmill at New Edinburgh. He was also known for building Rideau Hall, locks of the Rideau Canal, and the Bytown Museum. McKay also was on the Legislative Council of the Province of Canada.

James Maclaren, who once established industry in Wakefield, Quebec in 1853, leased a sawmill in New Edinburgh from Thomas McKay with partners, and in 1861, he bought out his partners and, in 1866, he purchased the mills after McKay's death. In 1864, again with his partners, he bought sawmills at Buckingham, Quebec, later buying out his partners.

Other notable lumber barons, importers, and politicians included James Skead, John Rochester, Daniel McLachlin, John Egan, William Borthwick, James Davidson, Andrew Leamy, William Stewart, William Hamilton, and George Hamilton.

== Legacy ==
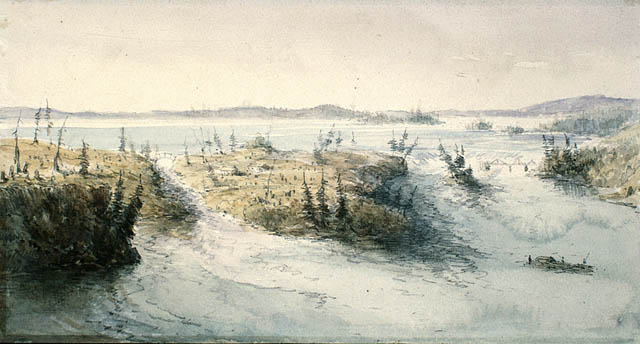
The Chaudière Falls and Chaudière Island before damming, 1838

The industry contributed to the population growth in Ontario and Quebec both indirectly, as a result of its economic boost, as well as directly, when ships from Quebec City went to ports such as Liverpool and returned with hopeful immigrants, providing cheap transportation. It also stimulated economic growth in both provinces, and J.R. Booth contributed greatly to the construction of the Canada Atlantic Railway.

There also was an environmental impact. The huge industrial operations at LeBreton Flats and the Chaudiere Falls caused pollution and damage to the lands. The beauty of the Chaudiere Falls had been completely changed by industry. The National Capital Commission removed a lot of the industrial structures in Ottawa and Hull in the 1960s. LeBreton, for various reasons, remained unoccupied for decades.

=== Places within city of Ottawa ===
LeBreton Flats and the Chaudière Falls were the locations of some of Canada's largest lumber mills, including those of Booth and Bronson. All of that is now gone now as part of the Greber Plan's efforts at beautifying the capital of Canada.

Bronson Avenue was named after the lumber baron. The Bank of Ottawa was founded due to the industry. The ByWard Market came about as part of Lower Town to serve the needs of Bytown's lumber-related population. Booth House still exists.

Ottawa Central Railway still carries lumber as one of its major commodities.

Hog's Back Falls were as John Mactaggart, in 1827, described them as "a noted ridge of rocks, called the Hog's Back, from the circumstances of raftsmen with their wares [timber rafts] sticking on it in coming down the stream."

List of designated heritage properties in Ottawa lists the Carkner Lumber Mill in Osgoode, Watson's Mill in Rideau-Goldbourne.

=== Places outside city of Ottawa ===
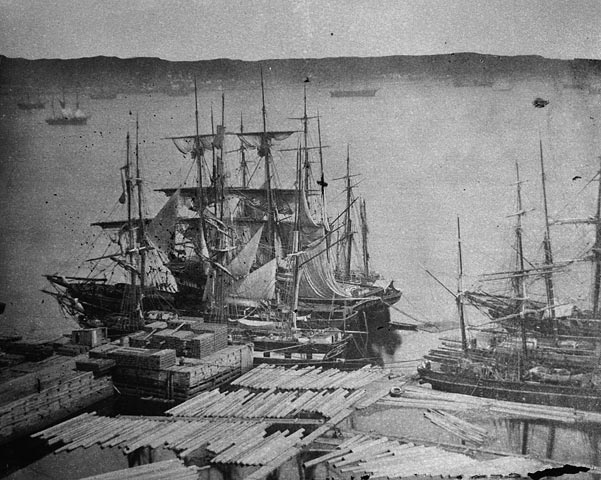
Ships loading timber in Quebec City, c. 1860–1870

The Ottawa Valley is a large swath of land, much of it along the Ottawa River. Renfrew, Ontario is often associated with the name. The Ottawa-Bonnechere Graben is a geologically related area.

Upper Canada was a name given to areas in present day Ontario in the 18th and 19th centuries, until 1840 or 1841, when the Province of Canada formed. In 1867, this also no longer existed with the Confederation of Canada when Ontario and Quebec became officially named, and became two of the four provinces of Canada.

Eastern Ontario's Irish Catholics mainly from Cork along with the Franco-Ontarians made up the majority of Rideau Canal builders and were heavily employed in the area's extensive lumber industry.

Gatineau was called Columbia Falls Village by Philemon Wright, Wright's Town (or Wrightstown) by most and Wright's Village by some during Philemon Wright's life. It later became Hull, Quebec in 1875 and then Gatineau, Quebec in 2002.

Buckingham, Quebec contained the mills of the J. MacLaren & Co. by James Maclaren.

Fassett, Quebec along with Notre-Dame-de-Bonsecours, Quebec became of interest economically for its oaks, pines, and maples, during the Napoleonic blockade. Its large oaks are of "high quality and particularly of large size, suitable for the construction of vessels."

Areas affected by the lumber industry on the Ottawa River include Arnprior, Hawkesbury, Ontario, Stittsville, Ontario, North Gower, Ontario, Kemptville, Ontario, Carleton Place, Ontario, Pembroke, Ontario, and Lachute.

Highlands East, Ontario Gooderham (not on the Ottawa River) southwest of Ottawa still has an active mill.

Fort-Coulonge, The Coulonge River joins the Ottawa River just east of Pembroke, Ontario. A slide owner named George Bryson Sr. built up much of the logging infrastructure in the area and was known for charging rival loggers a fee for using his timber slide. Today the Coulonge chute is a popular tourist attraction with activities such as ziplining and obstacle courses or visitors can just get a view of the falls.

Bonnechere Valley, The town of Bonnechere sits alongside the Bonnechere River. Along the Bonnechere river there are 5 chutes they are located in Castleford, Renfrew, Ontario, Douglas, Bonnechere caves, and Eganville, Ontario.

=== Lumber industry and sports ===
- Pembroke Lumber Kings
- Dave Gilmour
- Ottawa Curling Club was established in 1851 under the presidency of lumber businessman Allan Gilmour.

== Gallery ==
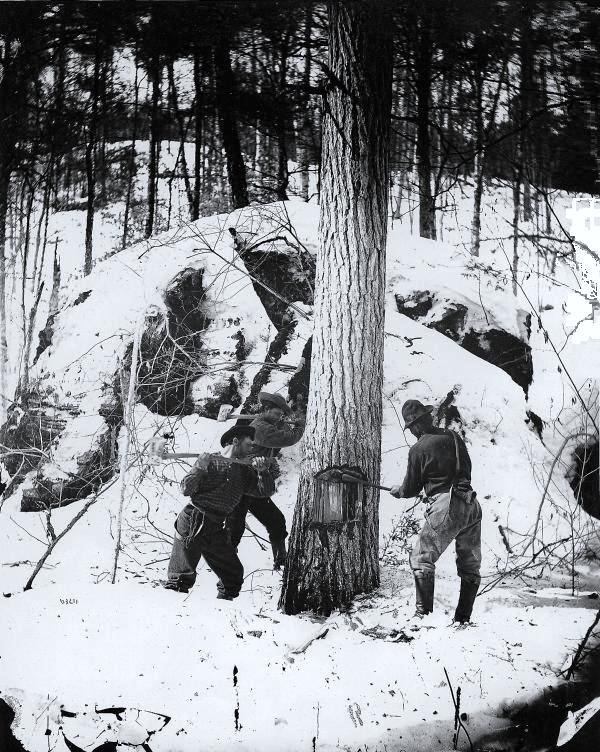
Workers cutting trees on the Upper Ottawa River, c. 1871

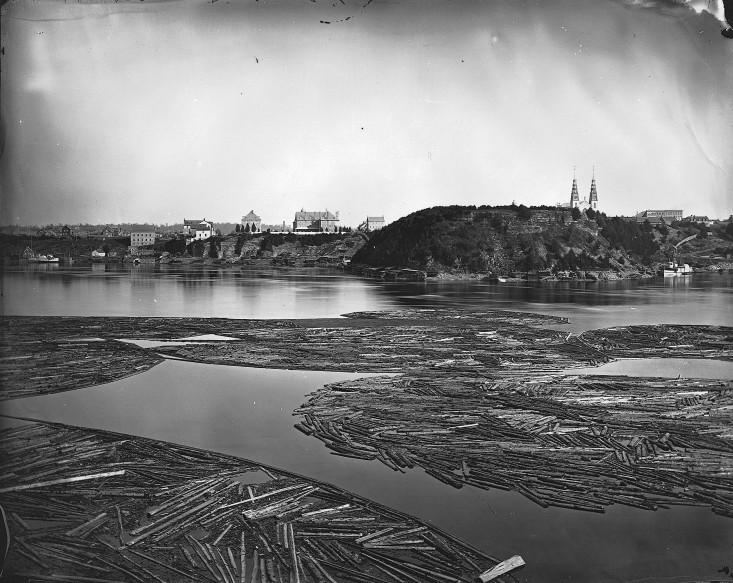
Timber booms on the Ottawa River, c. 1872

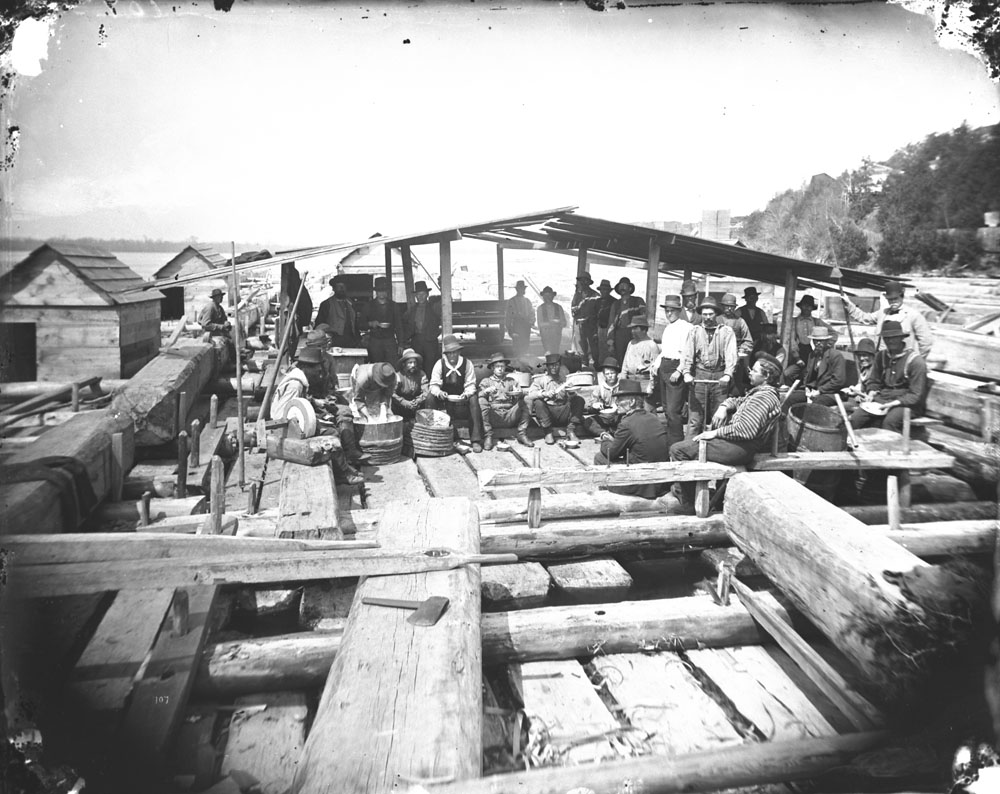
Cookery on J.R. Booth's timber raft, c. 1880

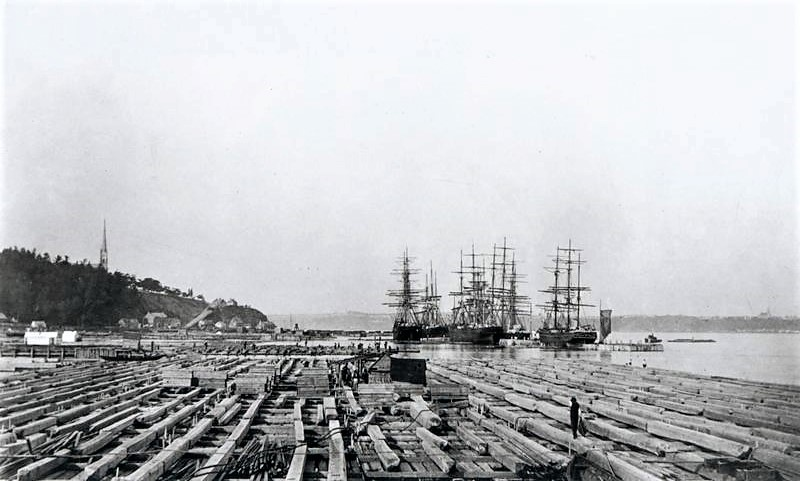
J.R. Booth's timber rafts arriving at Sillery, Quebec, c. 1891

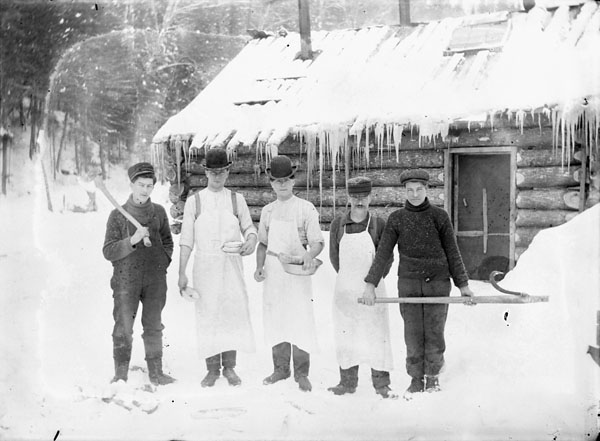
Lumber camp, Ottawa Valley, c. 1900

== See also ==
- History of Ottawa
- Economic history of Canada#Timber
- British timber trade#Trade restrictions
- Lumber industry
- Big Joe Mufferaw, a Canadian tall tale
- Joseph Montferrand, the inspiration for Big Joe Mufferaw himself

== Bibliography ==
- Bond, Courtney C. J. (1984), Where Rivers Meet: An Illustrated History of Ottawa, Windsor Publications, ISBN 0-89781-111-9
- Brault, Lucien (1946), Ottawa Old and New, Ottawa historical information Institute, OCLC 2947504
- Department of State (1871), Commercial relations of the United States with foreign countries (for 1869), Government Printing Office, United States
- Finnigan, Joan (1981). Giants of Canada's Ottawa Valley. GeneralStore PublishingHouse. ISBN 978-0-919431-00-3.
- Gaffield, Chad (1997) [1994 (in French)]. History of the Outaouais. Québec: Institut québécois de recherche sur la culture. ISBN 9782892242713.
- Greening, W. E. (1961), The Ottawa, Toronto: McClelland and Stewart Limited, OCLC 25441343
- Haig, Robert (1975), Ottawa: City of the Big Ears, Ottawa: Haig and Haig Publishing Co.
- Knowles, Valerie (2005), Capital Lives, Ottawa: Book Coach Press, ISBN 0-9739071-1-8
- Legget, Robert (1986), Rideau Waterway, Toronto: University of Toronto Press, ISBN 0-8020-6591-0
- Mika, Nick & Helma (1982), Bytown: The Early Days of Ottawa, Belleville, Ont: Mika Publishing Company, ISBN 0-919303-60-9
- Taylor, John H. (1986), Ottawa: An Illustrated History, J. Lorimer, ISBN 978-0-88862-981-4
- Williamsport Gazette and Bulletin (1873), Lumbering in Canada:October 1873:Ottawa: Manufacturers of the Ottawa Valley:Williamsport Gazette and Bulletin, The Wisconsin Lumberman
- Boyd (1875), Boyd's combined business directory for 1875-6, ISBN 9780665037146
- Woods, Shirley E. Jr. (1980), Ottawa: The Capital of Canada, Toronto: Doubleday Canada, ISBN 0-385-14722-8
