= Portage Bridge =

Portage Bridge Pont du Portage
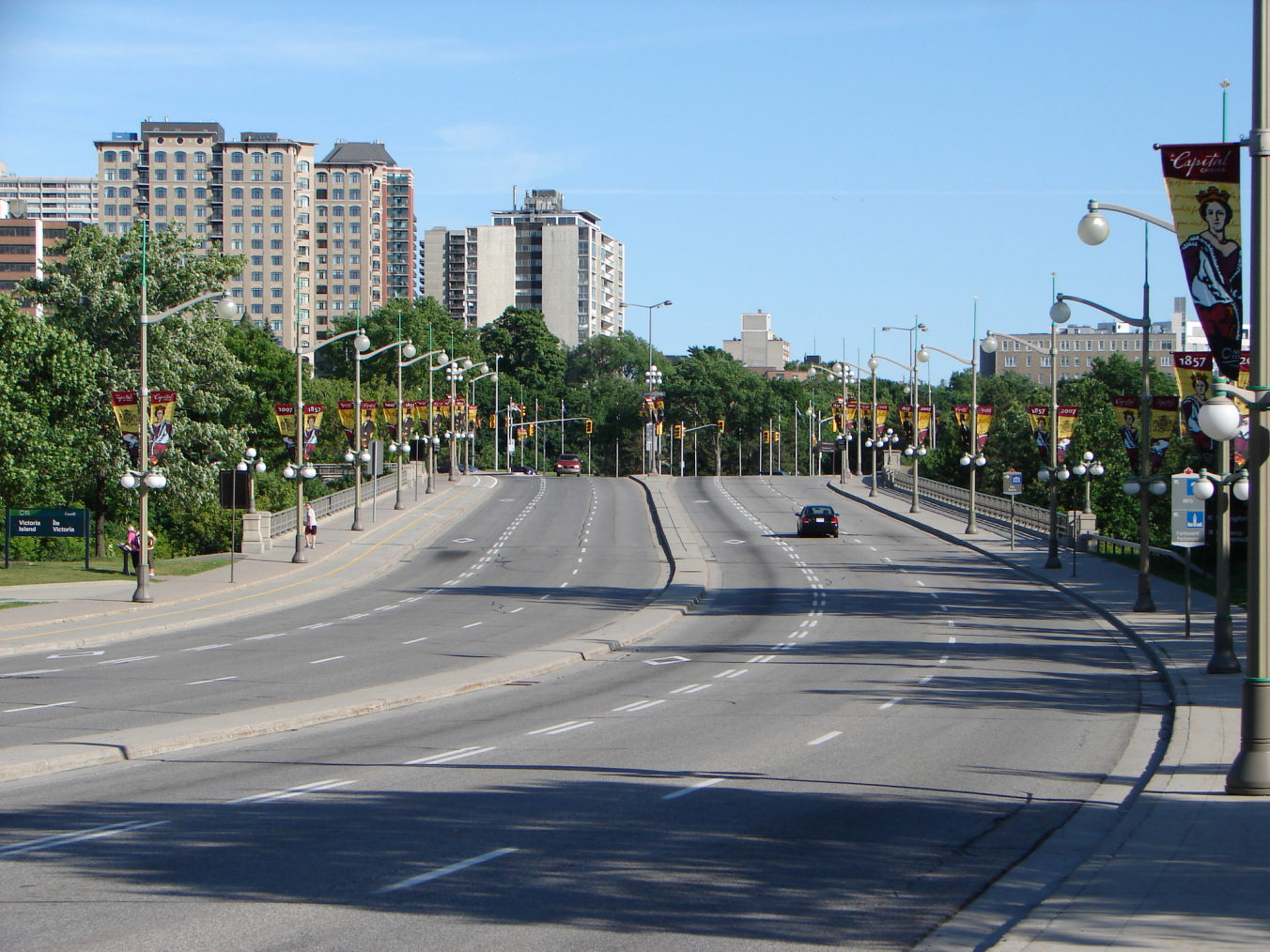
- Portage Bridge
- Coordinates: 45°25′20″N 75°42′49″W
- Carries: 6 lanes of Boulevard Maisonneuve, cyclists, and pedestrians
- Crosses: Ottawa River
- Owner: Government of Canada
- Maintained by: National Capital Commission

Characteristics
- Design: Beam Bridge
- Total length: 700m

History
- Opened: 1973

Statistics
- Daily traffic: 40,000

Location
- Interactive map of Portage Bridge

The Portage Bridge (French: Pont du Portage) crosses the Ottawa River just down-river from the Chaudière Bridge, joining the communities of Gatineau, Quebec and Ottawa, Ontario. It links Laurier Street and Alexandre-Taché Boulevard in the Hull sector of Gatineau and Wellington Street at the Garden of the Provinces and Territories in Ottawa, crossing Victoria Island and the former Philemon Island on the way.

The bridge was built by the National Capital Commission in 1973 and expanded in 1988. The bridge is named after the historic Portage Trail around the Chaudière Falls and Rapids which ended near the present location of the bridge.

== History ==
=== Recent improvements ===
On March 30, 2019, construction work began which includes improving safety of the bidirectional cycle track, adjustment to the motor vehicle lanes to accommodate the cycle track, repairs to the drains and the bridge expansion joints, and the asphalt surface of the bridge's northbound HOV lane.

== See also ==
- List of bridges in Canada
- List of bridges in Ottawa
- List of crossings of the Ottawa River
