= Philemon Wright =

Canadian politician (1760–1839)

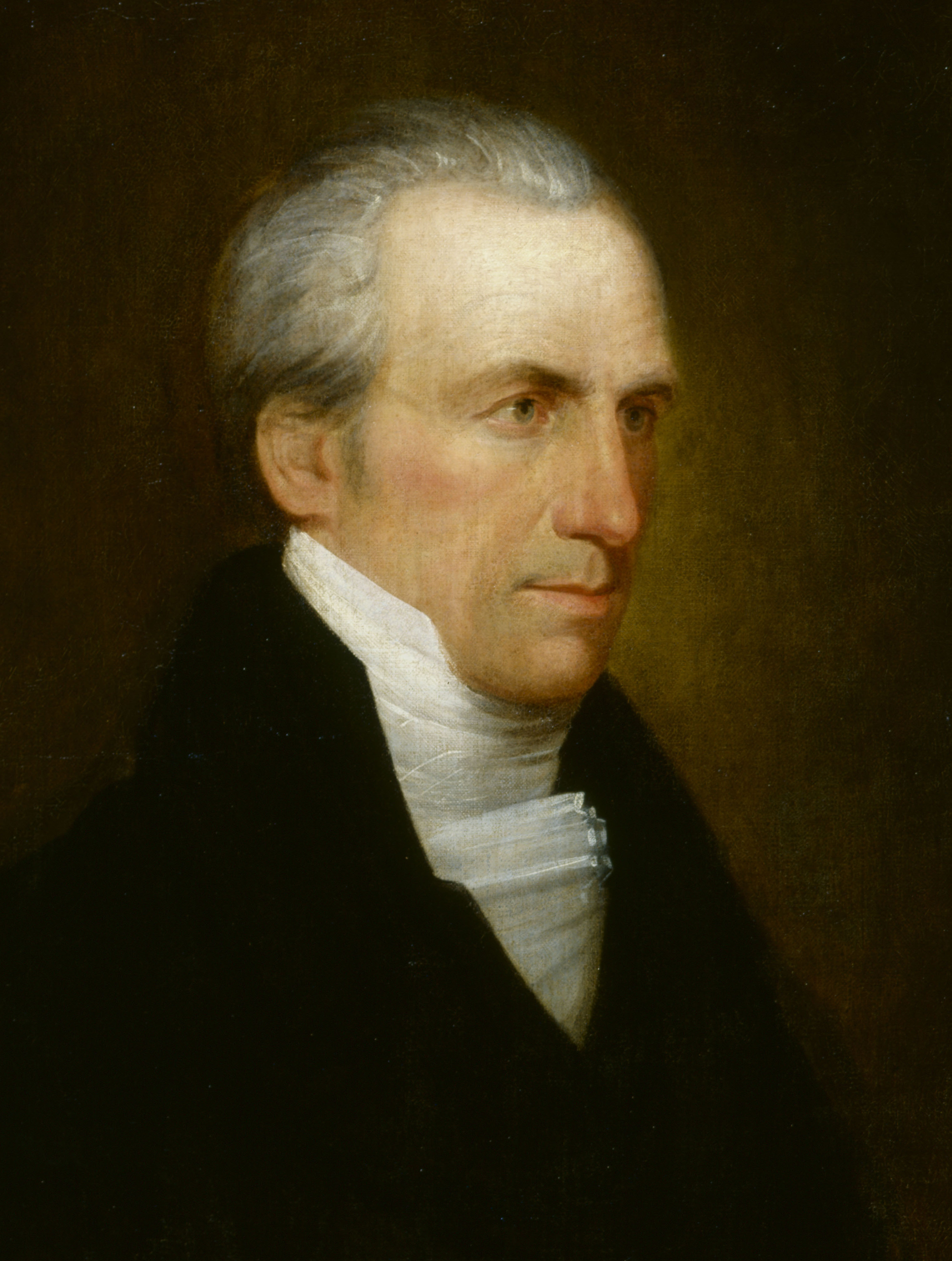
- Philemon Wright Esq. by John James-LAC

Member of the Legislative Assembly of Lower Canada
- In office 1830–1834

Personal details
- Born: September 3, 1760 Woburn, Massachusetts, British America
- Died: June 3, 1839 (aged 79) Wright's Town, Lower Canada
- Spouse: Abigail Wyman (m. 1782; died 1829)
- Children: Philemon Jr.; Tiberius; Abigail (Nabby); Mary (Polly); Ruggles; Abigail; Christopher Columbus; Christiana
- Parent(s): Thomas Wright, Elizabeth Chandler
- Occupation: Farmer, Founder of Ottawa River timber trade
- Military Service
- Allegiance: Continental Army; Upper Canada
- Branch: Massachusetts Militia; Canadian Militia
- Service years: 1775 - 1777; 1800 - 1830s
- Rank: Private; Sergeant; Lieutenant-Colonel
- Units: 26th Continental Regiment; Bullards' Regiment of Militia; Hull County Militia
- Conflicts: American Revolution; Siege of Boston; Saratoga Campaign; War of 1812

Philemon Wright (September 3, 1760 – June 3, 1839) was a farmer, lumberman and entrepreneur who founded the Ottawa River timber trade in 1806. He was also founder of what he named Columbia Falls Village, mostly known as Wright's Town (or Wrightstown) and Wright's Village to others, the first permanent settlement in the National Capital Region of Canada. Wright's Town, later became incorporated in 1875 and renamed Hull, Quebec, and then in 2002, as a result of a municipal amalgamation, it acquired its present name of the City of Gatineau.

== Biography ==
Wright was born in Woburn, Massachusetts, into the family of Thomas Wright and Elizabeth Chandler, a large and prosperous Woburn family that had been among the town's founders, 120 years before. Philemon Wright was raised as a farmer.

At the young age of 16, in December 1775 he enlisted as a private in Capt. Wood’s Company of the 26th Continental Regiment. He fought in several battles including the Siege of Boston From March to June 1776, he was serving in the regiment in New York. On May 10, 1777, he was appointed a Corporal in Capt. Jesse Wyman’s Company, Colonel Josiah Whitney’s Regiment, serving at Point Judith, Rhode Island until July 10, 1777. He was promoted to Sergeant on May 26, 1777. On August 18, 1777, he was appointed 3rd Sergeant in Capt. Abraham Foster’s Company of Bullard’s Regiment of Militia. He served until November 30, 1777, fighting in the Saratoga Campaign.

Nicknamed "the Old Squire" by his employees and friends, Wright was once described by John Mactaggart as "about six feet high, a tight man, with a wonderfully strange, quick reflective wild eye”.

On May 16, 1782, Philemon Wright married Abigail Wyman, a Woburn woman whose ancestors were among the founding families of Charlestown, Massachusetts, in 1628. Charlestown would later become Boston. Philemon and Abigail would have a large family of 8 children. Their children (ages listed as of 1800, when they arrived in Hull Township) were: Philemon Jr., 18; Tiberius, 13; Abigail (Nabby, who died at 7 yrs.); Mary (Polly) 10; Ruggles, 8; Abigail, 6; Christopher Columbus, 2; Christiana, b. 1803.

== Settlement of Wright's Town ==
Feeling the strain of overpopulation in Massachusetts, Wright first came to see the isolated and unsettled area of the Ottawa Valley in 1796, returned again in 1798, and once more in 1799. He finally decided that the best location for a new settlement would be next to the Chaudière Falls, near the intersection of the Tenàgàtino-sibi or Gatineau and Kitchi-sibi or Ottawa rivers, where he found thousands of acres of good soil and vast amounts of timber. He applied for the lands of the Township of Hull under the "leader and associates" regime and after swearing allegiance to the Crown, received the grant.

Wright used his natural leadership abilities to convince a group of Massachusetts settlers to come north with him. He sold his holdings in Woburn and led a group of 4 other families and 33 labouring men to the area, leaving on February 2, 1800, at the age of 39. With the help of a native Algonquin scout, who volunteered to help the group negotiate the treacherous voyage over ice from Kinodjiwan or Long-Sault at Carillon to the Akikodjiwan or Chaudière Falls, the group arrived on the western shore of the Gatineau River where it meets the Ottawa on March 7, 1800, and began to clear land. At first, their objective was to clear what was needed for homes and farmland for their survival. Two farms, the "Gateno Farm" (1800), as he named it, and the "Columbia Falls Farm" (1801) were the first to be cleared. Then, in 1801, at the foot of the Chaudière Falls, construction began on other enterprises. Wright preferred to call the falls the Columbia Falls, but the name never stuck. The name Columbia, however, was repeatedly used throughout the new settlement: Columbia Pond (now, Leamy Lake), the Columbia farm, the Columbia hotel, and Columbia road (now, St. Joseph blvd.).

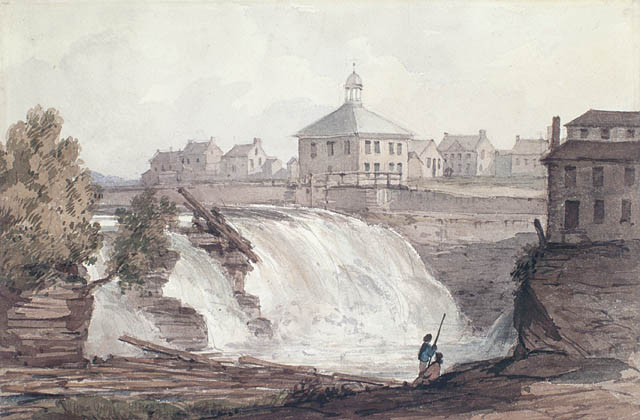
Wright's Tavern in Wright's Town 1851

Wright's settlement quickly became Wright's Town with the shops, mills and other enterprises that were built so that the small community would not be dependent on the expensive practice of importing goods from Montreal. Wright built a lumber mill, a hemp and grist mill and a smithy to fulfill their needs. When a fire burned down the smithy, he rebuilt it in stone, adding a trip hammer mill, four forges and four bellows operated hydraulically. He built a large bakehouse, shops for a shoemaker, a tailor, a bark grinding mill, as well as a tannery for curing leather. Always the opportunist, he also saw to it that a brewery and distillery were operating to slake the thirsts of the many employees he employed. Before long, he and his wife Abigail also saw to it that there was a teacher to teach all of the children in the community.

The process was long and difficult and by 1806 Wright had nearly exhausted his original capital of $20,000. In an effort to earn money and in order to keep his workers busy in the wintertime, he began the cutting of timber. Then, he attempted what was then thought impossible: to build a raft of timber and float it all the way to Quebec City. There, it would be sold for export to Britain. He built the first raft at the mouth of the Gatineau River. Then, on June 11, 1806, he, his 17 yr-old son Tiberius and just 3 other men (London Oxford, a free black man & friend/associate of Philemon, Martin Ebert, and John Turner) began the treacherous journey down the Grand (Ottawa) River. Despite taking two months and encountering many hurdles he reached Quebec on August 12, and sold his 700 logs and 6000 barrel staves. The timber trade on the Ottawa River had begun.

He founded several companies, among them a limestone quarry for building-stone and producing cement, The Hull Mining Company and P. Wright & Sons which, in particular, made him a great deal of money exporting timber, during the Napoleonic Wars when Britain was cut off from its traditional Baltic region suppliers.

As a pioneer and an entrepreneur, Wright had few equals. He was the point man for every builder, land speculator and government project in the region. According to John Mactaggart, the Royal Engineer in charge of the construction of the Rideau Canal and a contemporary of Philemon Wright, Wright should also be credited with having been the person who first suggested the building of the Rideau Canal, and once the canal's construction was under way, Wright secured most of the contracts for supplies, materials and craftsmen.

Despite his many achievements, he and his community faced near bankruptcy on several occasions, especially because of fluctuating tariffs in the timber industry, later on. His earliest efforts to establish his settlement almost exhausted his entire capital and then, when his town was ravaged by a disastrous fire in May 1808, the village was practically wiped out. A despondent Wright was ready to abandon the venture and possibly would have, if not for the encouragement he received from his sons Philemon Jr. and Tiberius to rebuild. They rebuilt the grist, hemp, sawmills, and a larger foundry within 6 months.

In 1819, Wright established the first passenger ship service on the Ottawa River. The first ship he used was the Packet, a four-ton vessel propelled by “sail and oars”. That same year, he and his son Philemon Jr. contracted Thomas Mears to construct a steamboat, which resulted in the Union of the Ottawa, which first set sail in 1823. The Union is described as “...measuring 125 feet on the deck, by 23 feet beam, drawing but little water, carrying 150 tons, and propelled by a 28-horsepower engine.”

Wright's son Ruggles Wright traveled to Europe to learn Scandinavian timber methods, and armed with this knowledge, returned home and constructed the first ever timber slide in Canada on the north side of the Chaudière Falls in 1829, which allowed logs to be transported over the falls without having to use the previous method of waiting for calm water, which could take weeks.

By 1820, Wright's Town was properly established. The population was 703, all either native New Englanders or first-generation Canadians. There were five mills, four stores, three schools, two hotels, two distilleries, and a brewery. For livestock, the count was 123 horses, 418 oxen, 503 cows, 505 pigs, and 558 sheep.

== Political career ==
Wright was elected to the legislature of Lower Canada to represent Ottawa County in 1830 and he and his settlement both saw great success. He voted against the Ninety-Two Resolutions. He was also the leader of Freemasonry in the area for many of the villagers and surrounding communities.

== Wright farms ==
Although he and his family spent their lives as lumber barons, Philemon Wright was always a farmer at heart. He was a strong advocate for "scientific farming" and selective breeding, and he was the first person to import prize Devon and Herefordshire cattle to the Ottawa Valley. In 1813, Wright sold 3,000 bushels of wheat in Quebec for $3.00 a bushel (this astronomically high price courtesy of the War of 1812). By 1823, the Wright family had created several large and lucrative farms, some of which covered most of the land occupied by present-day Hull & Aylmer. These included the Gatteno Farm near Leamy Lake, the Columbia Falls Farm (at Wright's village), The Columbia Farm (Chelsea Rd.), The Dalhousie Farm (by Leamy Lake), the Britannia Farm (on the Britannia Turnpyke), the Chaudière Farm (where Aylmer began), the second Gatteno Farm (east side of the Gatineau) and the Onslow farm (Township of Onslow). In fact, Wright's agricultural community, at the time of his death in 1839, was the most developed of Lower Canada. From Onslow Township (present-day Wyman) to present-day Buckingham, Philemon Wright owned 36,978.5 acres (over 150 km^{2}) The fame of Hull as an agricultural community in Canada, the US and Britain was well deserved.

The Gatteno Farm was the site of the original clearing by the Wright expedition in 1800, where stood Philemon Wright's first cabin he affectionately called "The Wigwam". His second home, a bigger home with a stone foundation, was built just north of the Wigwam. In 1801, at the Chaudière Falls, Wright & his sons created the Columbia Falls Farm and that is the location where Wright's Town grew up. In 1810, Philemon Sr. moved to his third home, built on the Columbia Falls Farm, on its 800 acres. He lived in that home until 1818, when he handed it over to his son Ruggles, along with the reins of all of the family's Chaudière operations. Eventually this property was purchased by E.B.Eddy and he tore down the Wright home and built a mansion named "Standish Hall". That 1st mansion burnt down in 1900 and he built another that ultimately became the very popular Hotel in Hull by the same name, where Louis Armstrong and many big bands came to play. Philemon's 4th home was built just west of the Standish Hall near the Chaudière Falls and was a grand home he named "The White House". The White House closely resembled the Wright Farm home in Winchester Massachusetts where Wright grew up. Almost a perfect copy of Wright's White House can be found at the Billings estate in Ottawa and given that Braddish Billings started his career in the employ of Wright, it may be no surprise that Billing's "grand, genteel" home, as he called it, would have been modeled after The Squire's, as Philemon was often referred to by his friends.

When Philemon Sr. moved to the Columbia Falls Farm in 1810, the Gatteno farm was put in the hands of Philemon Jr. and Sarah Wright, where Sarah, principally, raised animals and operated a distillery. It eventually ended up in the hands of Andrew Leamy who married Erexina Wright, the daughter of Sarah and Philemon Wright Jr. The Columbia Farm of 800 acres (3.2 km^{2}) was located at the junction of what would be the Brigham Road (now Gamelin) and Columbia Road (now boul. St. Joseph), and was operated first by Philemon Jr., then eventually owned by Thomas Brigham, who had married Philemon Sr.'s daughter, Abigail. The Britannia Farm, on the road leading to Aylmer, was owned by Philemon Jr. as was the Dalhousie Farm, south of what is now Leamy Lake. The Britannia Farm is now the site of the Royal Ottawa Golf Club, the Champlain & Château Cartier golf clubs. A farm at Lac Deschênes in Aylmer, called the Chaudière Farm, was established in 1818 by Philemon Jr. also a store and Inn was built at the landing.

After Philemon Jr.'s tragic death in a stagecoach accident on Dec. 5th, 1821, Philemon Jr.s' heirs ended up losing ownership of the Britannia Farm and only retained ownership of the Gatteno Farm because of some dubious paperwork that Wright Sr. had fabricated. He confessed to this in a codicil to his Will, dated 1838. In 1826, Philemon Jr.'s widow, Sarah (Sally) Olmstead Wright, married Nicholas Sparks (politician), who was then in the employ of P. Wright & Sons. Sparks would become a wealthy landowner & politician in the future Bytown. In 1822, Philemon Sr. gave the Chaudière Farms to Tiberius and Ruggles, and in 1823, he put the Chaudière Farm under the supervision of Charles Symmes, his nephew. The Dalhousie Farm went to Ephraim Chamberlain who was married to Philemon Sr.'s daughter Mary (Polly) Wright. As well, there were additional Wright farms along the Mountain Road.

Tiberius Wright established the (second) Gatteno Farm in 1816, which his son Alonzo Wright would inherit. By 1823, nearly 800 acres (3.2 km^{2}) at this farm had been cleared. It occupied the site of the current Collège St-Alexandre in Limbour.

== Retirement & death ==
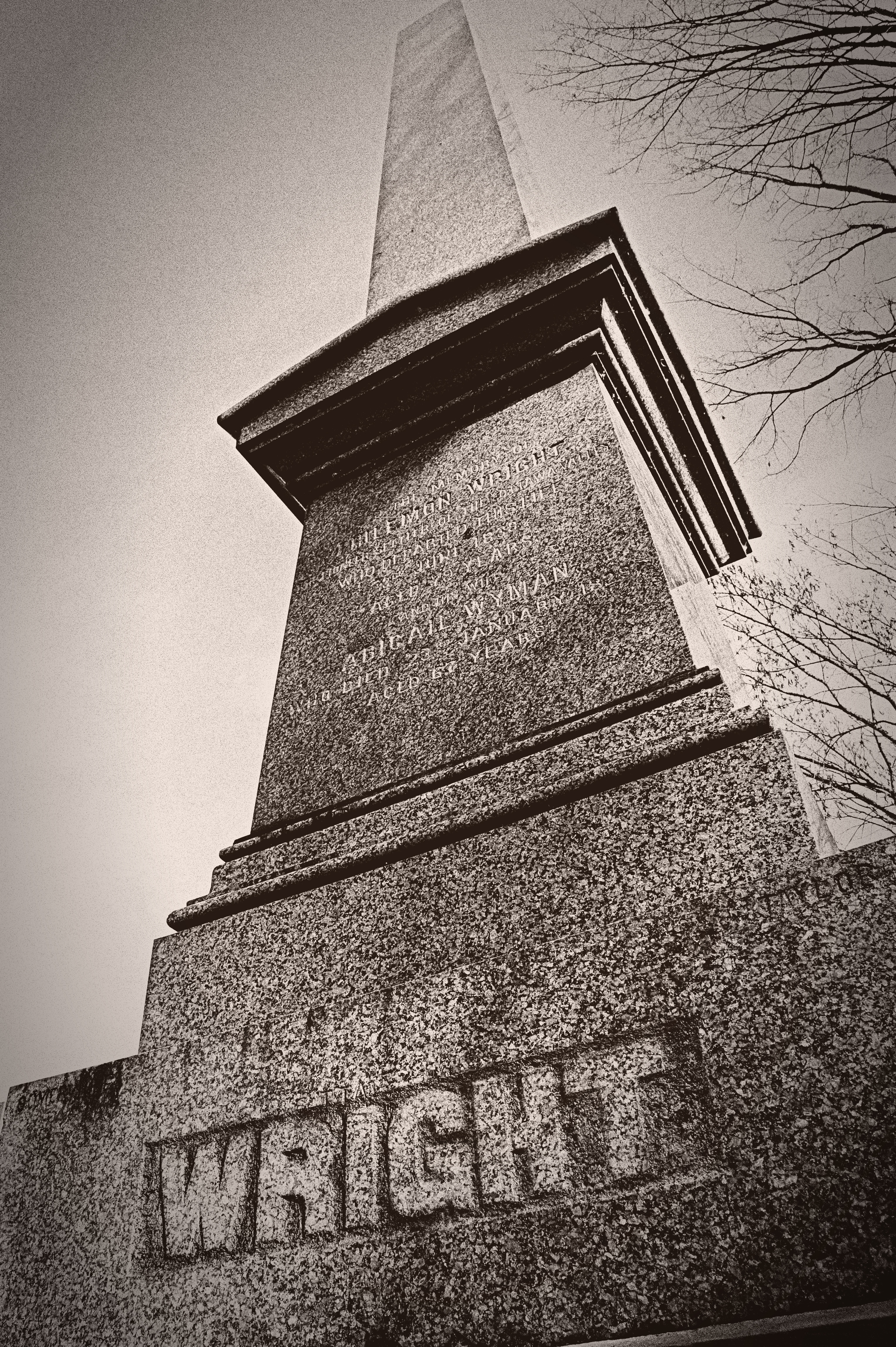
The memorial headstone of Philemon and Abigail Wright in St. James Cemetery, Hull, Qc.

At the end of his life, Philemon Sr. retired to another farm, this time in Onslow Township, Lower Canada (now the province of Quebec). Wright owned 12,000 acres that spanned the entire width of the County in the first six ranges of Onslow Township. In Wright's papers, in the National Archives of Canada, he frequently refers to his properties in Onslow, both his timber cutting operations and his farming activities there, listing acreages of oats and potatoes and his numbers of cattle. Unfortunately he did not state who was living on the properties or looking after his interests in the township. Joseph Bouchette's map, dated 1831, shows a few buildings and a road in the easternmost lots on the river, which is most likely to be the location of Philemon's Onslow Farm. Philemon Wright's brother-in-law, Joseph Wyman, and his son Joseph Jr., who also came from Woburn, obtained several hundred acres in the west end of the township through Wright. They named the new settlement Woburn after their New England home, and brought in other settlers. Woburn was later renamed Billerica (after Billerica, Mass.) and the name was eventually changed to Wyman.

Wright died on June 3, 1839, in Wright's Town, and is buried in St. James Anglican Cemetery, Gatineau (Hull Sector). He was survived by a large family, including his son Ruggles Wright who invented the timber slide.

Philemon Wright is regarded as the founder of both the cities of Ottawa and of Gatineau. Philemon Wright High School in Gatineau is named after him.

== Genealogical relationships ==
Interesting research through the years has established that through his own family and that of his wife, Abigail, Philemon Wright's family members are related to every President of the United States with the exception of Martin Van Buren and Donald Trump, and also related to the English Royal family
