= John Egan (Canadian politician) =

Canadian politician

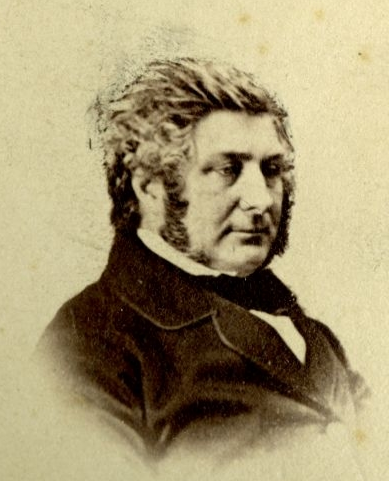

Member of the Legislative Assembly of the Province of Canada

Personal details
- Born: November 11, 1811 Lissavahaun near Aughrim, County Galway, United Kingdom of Great Britain and Ireland
- Died: July 11, 1857 (aged 45) Québec, Lower Canada
- Occupation: businessman, politician

John Egan (November 11, 1811 – July 11, 1857) was an Irish-Canadian businessman and political figure in the Ottawa region.

He was born near Aughrim, Ireland, in 1811. He came to Aylmer, Lower Canada, Canada, in 1830. After working with a lumber company on the upper Ottawa River, he entered the business himself near Bytown. He founded the town of Eganville in Ottawa Valley on the Bonnechere River, later expanding his operation to the Quyon, Petawawa and Madawaska Rivers. Egan was one of four men to finance the construction of the first flour and sawmill in Aylmer in 1839, and in partnership with Joseph Aumond, he founded the Union Forwarding Company in 1845. In the late 1840s, he began building a number of sawmills. Together with Ruggles Wright, he also operated a steamship transporting goods on the Ottawa River. Egan also played an important role in the development of railways service to the area, including the Bytown and Prescott Railway.

He bought James Wadsworth's farm at the ‘Fifth Chute’ on the Bonnechere in 1838, which he later developed into the village of Eganville, Ontario. John Egan is known as the namesake for Eganville. He built dams and timber slides along the Bonnechere River and employed thousands of men through lumber camps and transportation. Thanks to Egan's interest in red pine and business investments, the surrounding area would become a hub for lumber activity with Eganville at the centre.

By 1850, he was the dominant force in the timber trade along the Ottawa River. He had been elected first mayor of Aylmer in 1847. He was elected to the Legislative Assembly of the Province of Canada in the riding of Ottawa County in 1848 and was reelected there in 1851. In 1854, he became the first elected representative for the newly formed riding of Pontiac.

A decline in the red pine market forced him into bankruptcy in 1854.

He died in 1857 at Quebec City while still representing Pontiac, after two years of ill health.

In 1864, the Egan Township in Quebec was named in his honour (see: Egan-Sud, Quebec).

== See also ==
- Mac Aodhagáin
- Ottawa River timber trade
