= Victoria Island (Ottawa River) =

Island in Ottawa, Canada

Native name: Asinabka
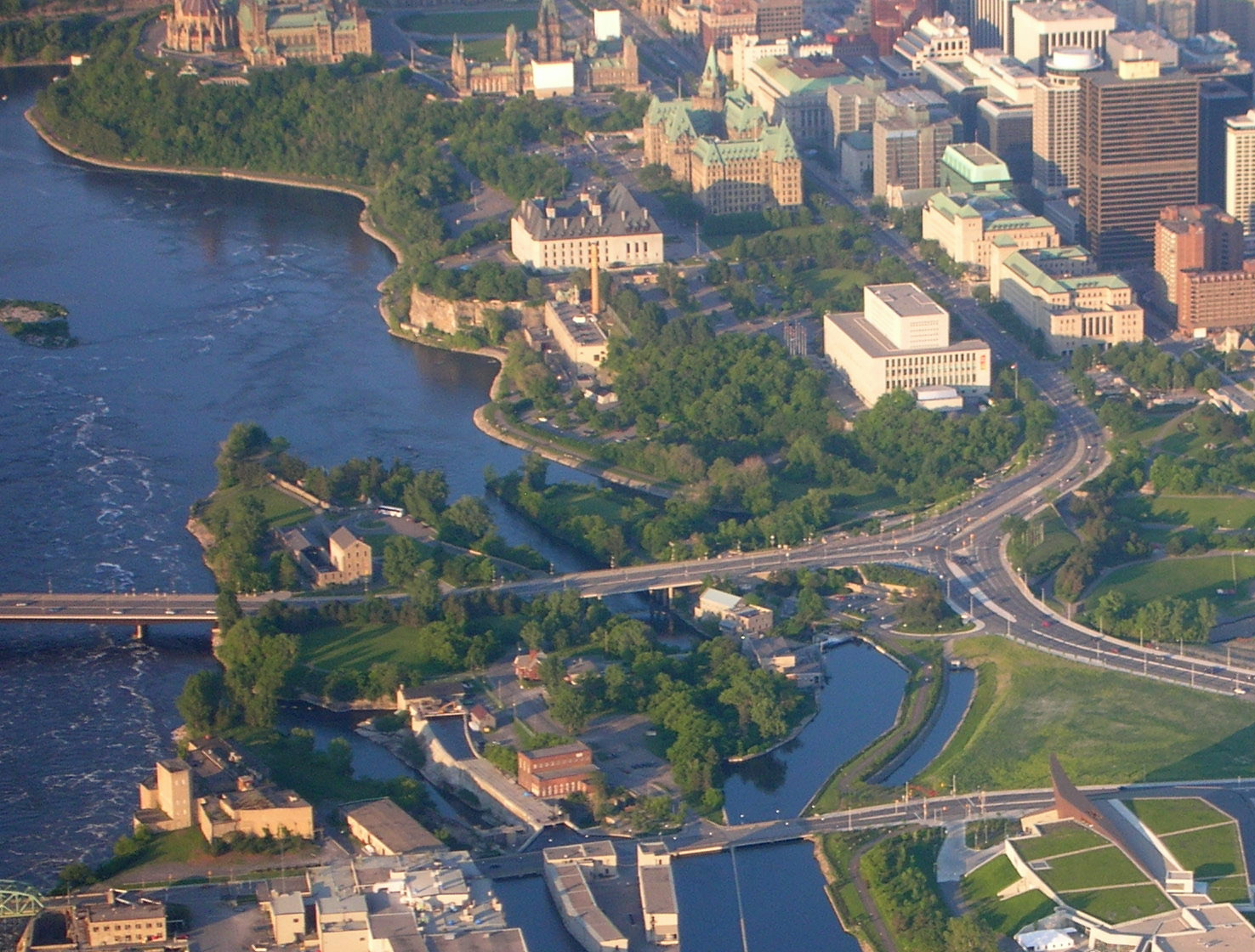

- Location within Southern Ontario Location within Canada

Geography
- Location: Ottawa River
- Coordinates: 45°25′15″N 75°42′46″W
- Area: 5.6 ha (14 acres)
- Length: 724 m (2375 ft)
- Width: 205 m (673 ft)
- Highest elevation: 54 m (177 ft)
- Highest point: Booth Street

Administration
- Canada
- Province: Ontario
- Census Division: Ottawa
- Ward: Somerset Ward

Victoria Island (French: Île Victoria, Algonquin: Asinabka) is an island in the Ottawa River, located north of LeBreton Flats, 1 km west of Parliament Hill in Ottawa, Ontario. The island is "a place of special significance" to the local Algonquian peoples, who use the island for ceremonial purposes and for protests. It is part of an archipelago of islands below Chaudière Falls, which also includes the former Philemon Island, Chaudière Island, Amelia Island and Albert Island.

Both the Portage Bridge and Chaudière Bridge cross the island, connecting Ottawa to Gatineau, Quebec on the other side of the river. Otherwise, public access to the island is currently restricted due to an environmental remediation project set to be completed in 2028. The project is projected to cost $13 million.

== History ==
Indigenous people inhabited the area up to 9,000 years ago, using the island to portage and for trade. The nearby Chaudière Falls were used for ceremonial purposes, meetings, and as a burial site. The island was named for Queen Victoria and, beginning in the 19th century, became the location of residences, commerce, and mixed industry, including a sawmill, ironwork, and manufacturing companies. The Wilson Carbide Mill, a four storey stone building named for Thomas Willson, the inventor of the process to produce calcium carbide and acetylene gas, was built on the island in 1900 to manufacture calcium carbide. It has since been recognized as a Federal Heritage Building.

Industrial use of the island contaminated the land, resulting in the current clean up operation. Soil samples taken in 2017 revealed that the island's soil, groundwater, and surface water were contaminated with ashes, lead, zinc, and fuel oil. The National Capital Commission (NCC) acquired most of the island in the 1960s and the remainder from Public Services and Procurement Canada in 2018.

=== Protests ===
The island has a long history of Indigenous protests. In 1974, a group of protesters known as "The Native People's Caravan" occupied the Carbide Mill, while in 1995 Aboriginal Defence League protesters broke into the mill and set up an "Aboriginal Embassy". In 1988, Algonquins of Barriere Lake set up tents on the island to protest "the ravaging of their land by the federal and Quebec governments". They returned in 1990, partly in solidarity of the Mohawk people in the Oka Crisis. In 2013, Attawapiskat First Nation chief Theresa Spence took up residence on the island to protest against the Government of Canada.

== Future ==
Following the completion of the remediation project, the NCC plans to work with the Algonquin Anishinaabe Nation to develop a master plan for the island and to re-open it to the public.

== See also ==
- Royal eponyms in Canada
