= Timber slide =

Device for moving timber past rapids and waterfalls

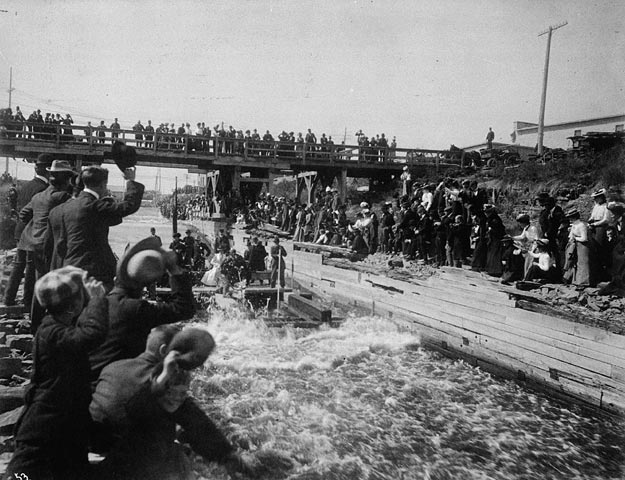
Timber slide in Ottawa, with the Duke of York on timber raft, Sept. 1901.

A timber slide (or log chute) is a device for moving timber past rapids and waterfalls. Their use in Canada was widespread in the 18th and 19th century timber trade. At that time, cut timber would be floated down rivers in large timber rafts from logging camps to ports such as Montreal and Saint John, New Brunswick. Rapids and waterfalls would, however, damage the wood and could potentially cause log jams. Thus at these locations timber slides were constructed. These were thin water filled chutes that would run parallel to the river. They would usually only be wide enough for a single log and one at a time the logs would be directed down it. The idea is attributed to Ruggles Wright who introduced the first one in 1829 not far from what is today down-town Hull, Quebec, Canada. Later, the slides could often be up to a kilometre in length. They were most commonly found on the Ottawa River system. The Bonnechere River in Eastern Ontario had five chutes along the waterway before emptying into the Ottawa River.

In some areas the timber slide became a tourist attraction, the most notable being the 1.2 km chute bypassing the Chaudière Falls on the Ottawa River in Ottawa. Its most notable visitors are the Duke of York, who later became King George V, and his wife, the Duchess of York Mary of Teck.

Timber slides disappeared after the construction of canal networks and the decline of the timber trade. They were almost all out of service by the First World War.

== See also ==
- Log flume
- Ottawa River timber trade
- Tømmerrenna is the term for a timber slide in Norway, where they were also common.
