= Walker's Auctions =

- Industry: Art, auctions
- Founded: 1937
- Headquarters: Ottawa, Canada
- Area served: Worldwide
- Key people: Jeffrey Walker (deceased), Christine Ross
- Products: Fine Art & Collectibles
- Website: www.walkersauctions.com

Known as Walker's Auctions, Walker's Fine Art & Estate Auctioneers Inc. was a Canadian auction house specializing in Inuit, Canadian, and European art. Founded in Ottawa in 1937, Walker's Auctions was active in the global art market as one of the leading resellers of Inuit Art. Their auctions were held in Ottawa, Toronto and previewed in Montreal.

== History ==
Founder William Scott "Bill" Walker (1910-1987) was born and educated in Edinburgh, Scotland. In 1929, Walker left Scotland to apprentice with his uncle's firm, Fyfe's Antiques in Vancouver. At Fyfe's, Walker coordinated the sale of monthly shipments of period furniture and fine art arriving in Montreal from Great Britain. In 1937, while still employed by Fyfe's, Walker settled in Ottawa where he founded W.S. Walker Auctioneer.

During the post-war period, Walker's became well known as auctioneers to Ottawa's elite, including the Booth Estate Sale which included art, period furniture and wedding gifts from the marriage of Lois Booth and Count Erik of Rosenborg. At that time Walker hired cabinet maker and furniture restorer Charles MacKenzie. In 1964, son Peter Walker joined as partner in the firm, W.S. Walker & Son, Auctioneers & Appraisers. A series of prominent auctions such as the Rochester and Billings Estates featured Fine Art as well as in antique furniture, fine silver, jewelry, coins, rare books and stamps. Establishing price points for works by Millet, Corot, and Mauve of the Hague school and by Félix Ziem of the Barbizon school, Walker's increasingly became known as auctioneers of both Canadian and European paintings. In 1987 following the death of Bill Walker, the firm was renamed Walker's Fine Art & Estate Auctioneers.

In 1995 Peter Walker was joined by son Jeffrey and, in 1997, by daughter Christine. At this time, Walker's instituted a spring and fall auction of Canadian & International Fine Art and collectibles. Held at Tudor Hall in Ottawa, items on auction are also previewed in Toronto and Montreal. During the same period Walker's also instituted bi-monthly "discovery" estate auctions featuring 19th- and 20th-century collectibles: furniture, carpets, porcelain, figurines, silver and plated wares. In 2009, at the death of Peter Walker, Jeffrey Walker took over as president with Christine Walker Ross as Secretary & Treasurer.

=== Modernity ===
Located in Ottawa, the capital of Canada, articles at auction have furbished government collections. In 2004, a painting box belonging to A. Y. Jackson purchased at Walker's was donated to the Canadian Collections Agency. The company also holds auctions in Toronto. In 2010, Walker's Rare Book Auction in association with D & E Lake Ltd. included original drawings of arctic natural history by Canadian artist James Archibald Houston and, the 1959 Nous Avons with etchings by Miró.

Within the area of Fine Arts, new speciality categories were introduced including Asian Art in October 2011, followed by Inuit Art in November 2011. Assisted by Inuit art specialist, Ingo Hessel, the sale of over 285 lots was "second in size to Toronto auction house Waddingtons", and drew local, national and international attention.

On May 12, 2013, Walker's held their fourth major Inuit Art auction which attracted a global clientele. Auction participants included 743 registered online bidders from "10 provinces, 49 states and a few dozen other countries". As sales were recorded as $600,000 CDN, Walker's was acknowledged as one of the leaders, if not the leader, in the Inuit Art resale market.

In August 2022, Jeffrey Walker was charged with fraud and possessing stolen property for several incidents that began in 2019.

Jeffery Walker died on August 1, 2023, at 48 years old.

== Select auctions ==
- 1957 Booth Estate Auction: Major works by Barbizon school, English Impressionists, and Fantin-Latour, sold at trend-setting prices along with signed 18th-century French furniture, Ming porcelain and palace carpets.
- 2004 Estate Auction of Dr. Naomi Jackson Groves, a niece of A. Y. Jackson: This included A. Y. Jackson's paintbox, monogrammed briefcase, tray, duffel bag containing a sleeping bag, and a folding cot and record player, as well as a paintbox which belonged to Barker Fairley.
- 2010 Rare Books Auction with D & E Lake Ltd. of Toronto: Works included Lahontan, New Voyages to North America, 1703; Charlevoix, Histoire Et Description Générale De La Nouvelle France, 1744; and Kalm, Travels into North America, 1770–71.
- 2011 First Asian Art Auction in Toronto: Over 200 lots of decorative and fine Asian art included a bound, publisher-assembled album of 100 prints of kabuki plays by Toyokuni III (Kunisada) 1786–1864.
- 2011 First Inuit Art Auction: Over 285 pieces were auctioned including the collection of Inuit Art dealers John and Mary Robertson. A 1960 print from famed Cape Dorset artist Kenojuak Ashevak, Dog Sees the Spirits, valued at $6,000, sold for $22,420, while a 1970s untitled pencil crayon drawing by Jessie Oonark sold for $14,160.
- 2013 Fourth Inuit Art Auction: Established Walker's reputation as one of the leading resellers of Inuit Art in Canada.
- 2013 Fall Canadian and International Fine Arts Auction: A record-breaking sale included a Chinese plate from the Yuan or early Ming Dynasty which sold for $1,200,000 CAD.
