= Marc Raymond =

Swiss sculptor

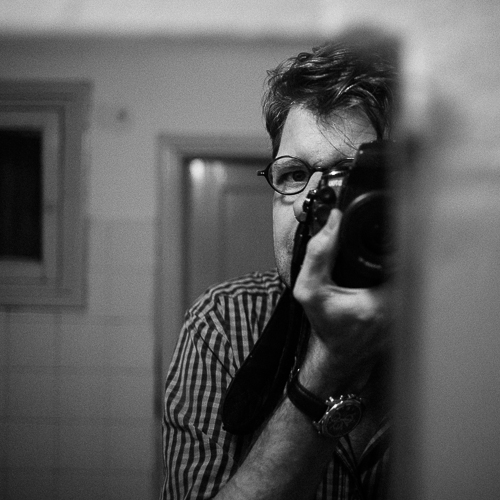
- Born: Marc Raymond; 8 November 1968 (age 57); Martigny, Switzerland
- Occupation: Sculptor
- Years active: 1996–present

Marc Raymond (born 8 November 1968, Martigny, Switzerland) is a Swiss sculptor who works with painted wood and plywood to create abstract sculptures.

His sculptures and works on paper have been exhibited in galleries and cultural centres during personal and group exhibitions in Switzerland, Canada, France, Germany, Portugal and Greece.

Raymond now lives and works in Lisbon, Portugal.

== Biography ==
Marc Raymond was born on 8 November 1968, in Martigny, in the Swiss canton of Valais. He grew up in Saillon, Switzerland.

After his schooling, he trained as a carpenter and cabinetmaker, then studied at the Brienz School of Sculpture (Schule für Holzbildhauerei). After earning his degree, Raymond opened his own studio in Saillon in 1996. He has worked mainly with wood, but also stone, bronze and concrete. At the beginning of his career, Raymond's sculptures were centred on the human being. Over time, his sculptures become more raw and massive.

In 1991 he spent six months in the United States and in 1999 and 2000 he spent a year in China.

In 2001, he received third prize at the International Sculpture Symposium in Morges, Switzerland, with the sculpture Homme à la grande main.

In 2002, he was commissioned by the municipality of Saillon to create the sculpture, La Ronde. This work, composed of seven 200 cm (79 in) tall bronze figurative sculptures, pays homage to the diversity and openness of the residents of Saillon.

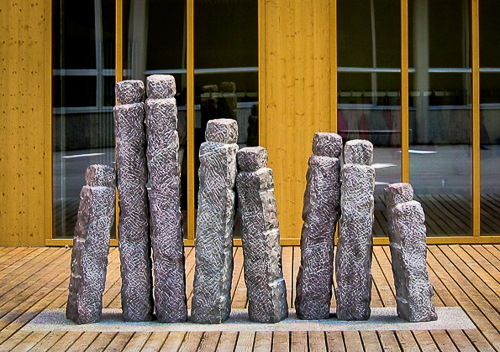
Assemblée, marble, 158 cm (62 in), Saillon's School Centre, 2003

Raymond won first prize for the creation of a sculpture in marble for the Saillon's School Centre. Representing a group of children, this sculpture prefigures, through its very simple forms and raw material, the evolution of the artist's movement toward the abstract.

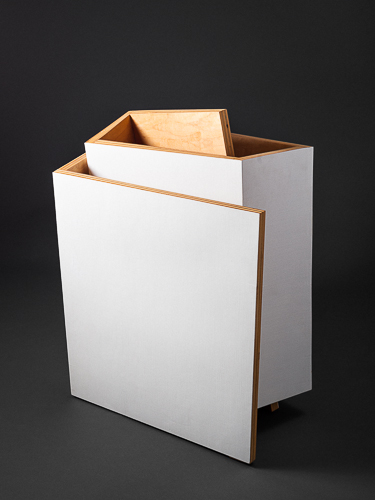
Interfaces n.1, painted plywood, 61 cm (24 in), 2008

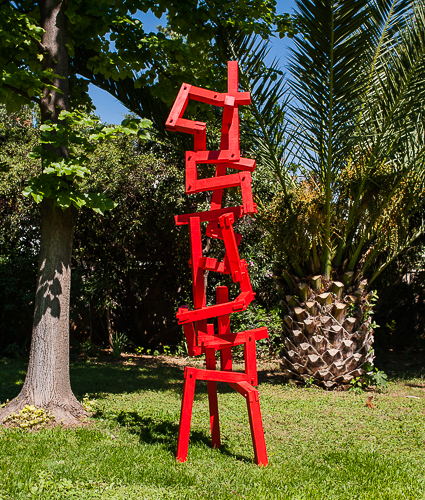
Rouge n.1, from the Bout à bout series, painted wood, 280 cm (110 in), 2013

In 2004, he exhibited raw human figures in wood, as well as a series of concrete sculptures, at the Gallery Grande-Fontaine in Sion, Switzerland. In 2005, while Raymond lived in Madrid, he decided to stop working on figurative art and to devote himself entirely to the abstract. He developed a new technique by constructing his sculptures with wood assemblies rather than subtractive sculpting.

The Découpages series, an assembly of paper surfaces without any colour or glue, was created in 2007. These two-dimensional cuttings led to the creation of the Interfaces sculpture series from 2008 to 2010. These sculptures are made of construction plywood assembled and painted in monochrome. The coherence of the works is found in the play of balance, imbalance and internal tensions. The sculptures are placed on the ground, on pedestals or inclined against walls. They were exhibited during several personal exhibitions - notably at the Center des Art Léo-Ayotte in Shawinigan, Quebec, Canada, in 2008; at the Art School Gallery in Ottawa, Canada, in 2009; at the Center d'Exposition de Mont-Laurier, Quebec, Canada, in 2010; at the Maison des Arts et de la Culture in Brompton, Quebec, Canada, in 2011; as well as at the Athens Art Gallery in Athens, Greece, in 2014 with a text by Swiss curator Benoît Antille.

In 2013, the artist created the first sculpture from the series Bout à bout, with Rouge n.1. It was exhibited in the garden of the residence of the Swiss ambassador in Athens then at the Athens Art Gallery in 2014. This series is made of raw construction timber assembled end to end. The artist exhibited again in 2017 at the Galerie Grande-Fontaine in Switzerland. Built with fir and larch boards, common building materials in Switzerland, his sculptures become more massive and bare. The raw material and the assemblages can be seen, while parts of the sculpture are painted in bright colours.

In 2019, his solo exhibition Éloge à la Main (Praise to the Hand) took place at the Athens Art Gallery in Greece, with a text by independent curator and art critic Maria Xypolopoulou for the catalogue. Alongside his sculptures, which tend more and more toward simplicity, he exhibits the continuation of the Bout à bout series with the sculptures Construction 1, 2 and 3 as well as twenty decoupages on paper forming a rectangle 220 cm (87 in) on a side.

Marc Raymond lives and works in Lisbon.

== Works ==
Raymond's works are described as abstract and refined, characterized by an economy of means, both in the materials used and colour. His favourite materials are construction wood, plywood and paper, ordinary materials. Through these constructions, tensions, energy and imbalances can be discerned in the coherence of the whole. He attempts to materialize his interior life and quest. The works are generally in series. Raymond is in the lineage of concrete art; with him the material is respected and is seen as it is, the visible assemblages are an integral part of the work.

== Personal exhibitions ==
- 2025: Alliance Française Gallery, mit Pedro Guerra, Lisbon, Portugal
- 2019: Praise to the Hand, Athens Art Gallery, text by Maria Xypolopoulou, Athens, Greece
- 2017: Galerie Grande Fontaine, with Martine Rouiller, Sion, Switzerland
- 2014: Athens Art Gallery, text by Benoît Antille, Athens, Greece
- 2013: Residence of the Swiss Ambassador, Athens, Greece
- 2011: Maison des Arts et de la Culture de Brompton, Quebec, Canada
- 2010: Interfaces, Mont-Laurier Exhibition Center, Quebec, Canada
- 2009: Interfaces, Ottawa School of Art Gallery, Ontario, Canada
- 2009: Galerie Cube, with Mary Wong, Ottawa, Ontario, Canada
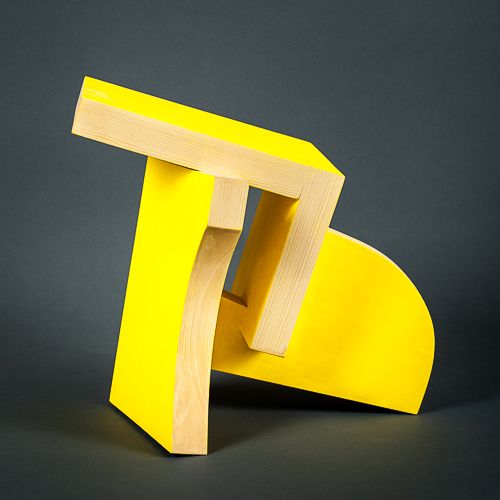
- Yellow n.2, painted wood, 2019
  2009: Residence of the Swiss Ambassador, Ottawa, Ontario, Canada
- 2008: Galerie de l'Alliance Française, with Ingo Hessel, Ottawa, Canada
- 2008: Constructions, Atrium Gallery, Ottawa, Ontario, Canada
- 2008: Center des Arts Léo-Ayotte, Shawinigan, Quebec, Canada
- 2005: Gallery of the Château de Venthône, with Isabelle Fontannaz, Switzerland
- 2004: Galerie Grande Fontaine, with Gilles Scherlé, Sion, Switzerland
- 1999: Galerie de la Treille, with Paula Gaillard, Sion, Switzerland

== Main group exhibitions ==
- 2024: In&Out, Espace Sohome, Lisbon, Portugal
- 2023: 50 Years of Visarte Valais, Manor in Martigny, Martigny, Switzerland
- 2018: Arthoteque of the canton of Valais, Sion, Switzerland
- 2017: Summer exhibition, Athens Art Gallery, Athens, Greece
- 2014: Art Athina, with the Athens Art Gallery, Athens, Greece
- 2013: 40 Years of Visarte Valais, Manor in the town of Martigny, Switzerland
- 2001: Eight Artists, Galerie La Grange in Vannay, Monthey, Switzerland

== Honours ==
- 2016: Prize of the Academy of Athens for the book National Garden, by Nikolaos Tambakis and Elissabet Bargianni, photographs by Marc Raymond
- 2009: Becomes a member of Visarte, the Society of Professional Visual Artists of Switzerland
- 2002: First prize for the sculpture project for the school centre, completed in 2003, Saillon, Switzerland
- 2001: Third jury prize, International Sculpture Symposium, Morges, Switzerland
- 1998: First prize, Art Sierre, Sierre, Switzerland

== Publications ==
- Tambakis, Nikolaos & Bargianni, Elissabet (2016). Εθνικος Κηπος: Ενας Τοπος Με Μακρα Κηποτεχνικη Ιστορια [National Garden: A Place With a Long Horticultural History] (in Greek). Athens, Greece: Amis du Jardin National. ISBN 9786188257306.
- Cordonier, Jacques; Olesen, Mads; Gartentor, Heinrich; Largey, Anne Jean-Richard; Ribordy, Véronique; Taramarcaz, Josette & Tissières, Floriane (2013). 40 Ans Visarte Valais Catalogue (in French). Martigny, Suisse: Art Ray Éditions, Martigny.
- Lemonidou, Eve (2010). International Contemporary Artists. New York, New York: Lemonidou Eve. ISBN 978-9609322980.
