= Nanny Goat Hill =

Hill in Ontario, Canada

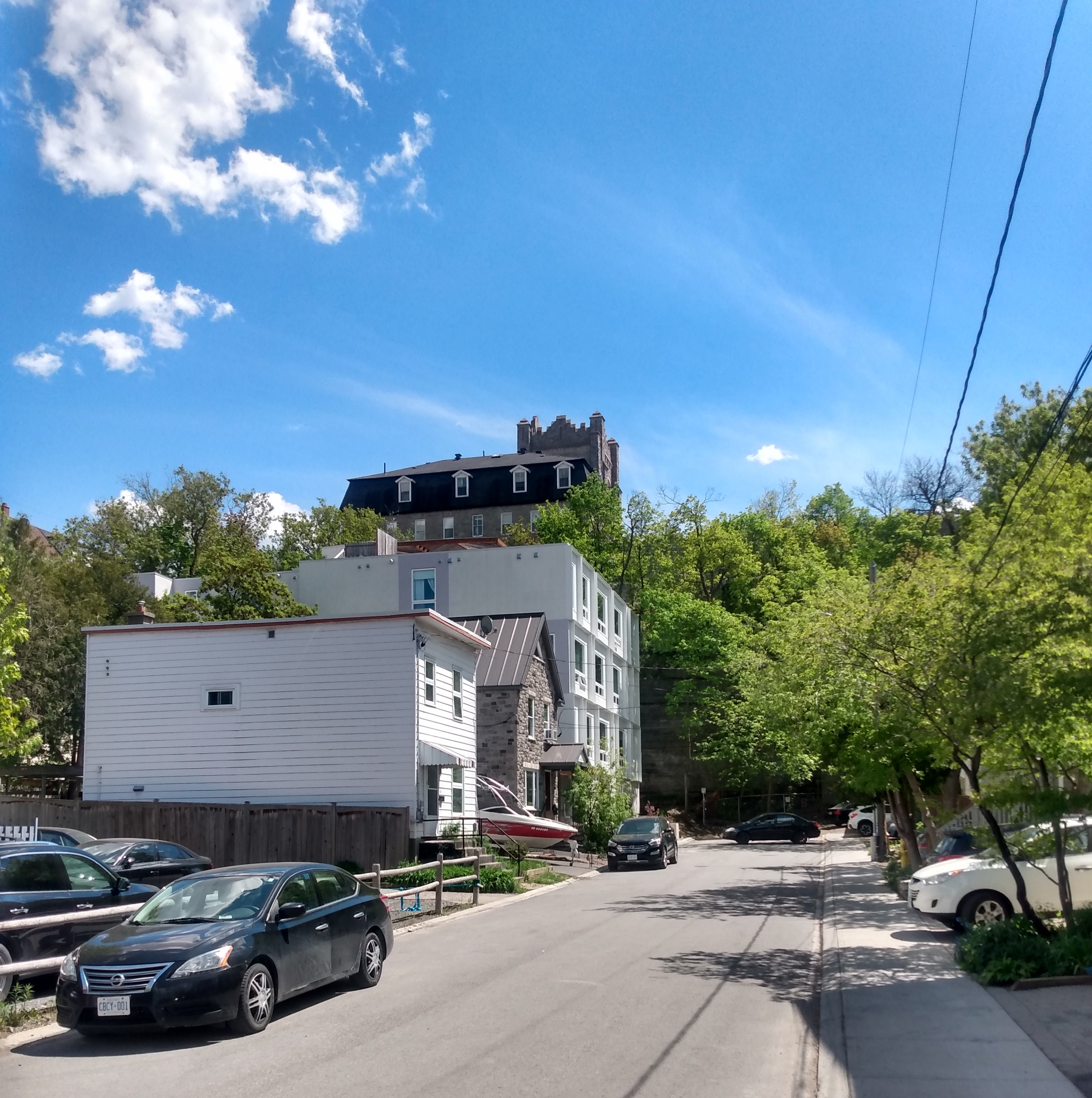
- Dominican University College atop the escarpment, overlooking Perkins Street.

Highest point
- Elevation: 81 m (266 ft)
- Coordinates: 45°24′40″N 75°42′30″W

Geography
- Location within Southern Ontario
- Country: Canada
- Province: Ontario
- City: Ottawa

Nanny Goat Hill is a hill located on the west side of Downtown Ottawa, Ontario, Canada.

The hill is characterized by an escarpment that forms the north-western side of the hill, overlooking LeBreton Flats. The escarpment runs roughly from the corner of Booth and Spruce Streets in the west to the corner of Bronson Avenue and Slater Street in the north. The highest point on the hill is 81m above sea level, at the corner of Primrose Avenue and Arthur Street, close to Dominican University College which overlooks the escarpment. Much of Ottawa's Chinatown is located on the south side of the hill. Its business association's former name, "Somerset Heights" was an allusion to the hill.

The name "Nanny Goat" is said to have begun to be applied as a nickname for the hill in the 19th century, as its escarpment was so steep that only nanny goats could climb it. Another origin story cites that it was named after goats that pastured there.

The hill's steep limestone escarpment has been cited as a reason why Downtown Ottawa was spared from the 1900 Hull–Ottawa fire, which damaged more of the city to its west.
