= Ayotte =

Ayotte is a surname. Notable people with the surname include:

- Kelly Ayotte (born 1968), governor of New Hampshire and former United States senator
- Leo Ayotte (1909–1976), artist
- Mark Ayotte (born 1964), referee

== See also ==
- Ayotte Drums, drum producer
- Ayotte v. Planned Parenthood of Northern New England, a 2006 case in the US Supreme Court on the subject of abortion
