= Canadian Tire Centre =

Multipurpose arena in Ottawa, Canada

- CTC

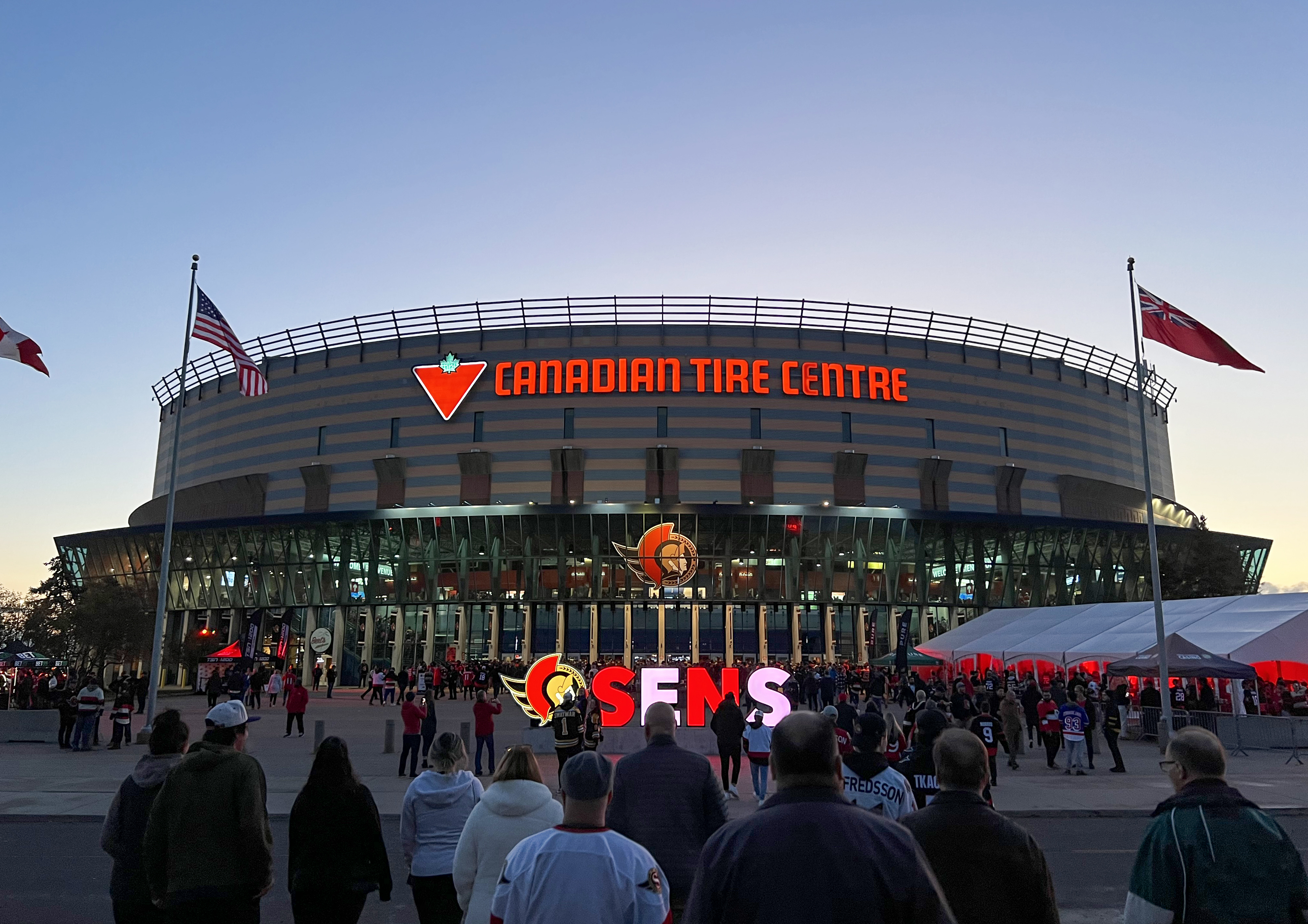
- Canadian Tire Centre in 2022

- Location within Ontario Location within Canada
- Former names: The Palladium (1996); Corel Centre (1996–2006); Scotiabank Place (2006–2013)
- Address: 1000 Palladium Drive
- Location: Ottawa, Ontario, Canada
- Coordinates: 45°17′49″N 75°55′38″W
- Owner: Capital Sports Properties Inc.
- Operator: Canadian Tire
- Capacity: Concerts: 12,000–17,000; Ice hockey: 18,500 (1996–2005); 19,153 (2005–2015); 18,694 (2015–2017); 18,572 (2017); 17,373 (2017–2018); 18,655 (2018–2024); 17,997 (2024–2025); 17,750 (2025–2026); 17,010 (2026–present) (18,510 with standing room)
- Record attendance: Ice hockey: 20,511 (December 4, 2014 vs. Detroit Red Wings)
- Field size: 650,000 sq ft (60,000 m^{2})
- Public transit: OC Transpo 62 162 400 Canadian Tire Centre station

Construction
- Groundbreaking: July 7, 1994
- Opened: January 15, 1996
- Renovated: 2005, 2012, 2015–2017, 2025–2026
- Cost: CA$170 million ($285 million in 2025 dollars)
- Architect: Rossetti Architects Murray & Murray Architects
- Project manager: ZW Group
- Structural engineers: Carruthers & Wallace Ltd.
- Services engineers: J. L. Richards & Associated Ltd.
- General contractor: PCL Constructors Bellai Brothers Construction Ltd.
- Main contractor: Eastern Inc.

Tenants
- Ottawa Senators (NHL) (1996–present); Ottawa Wheels (RHI) (1996–1997); Ottawa Rebel (NLL) (2001–2002); Ottawa 67's (OHL) (2012–2014); Ottawa SkyHawks (NBL Canada) (2013–2014); Ottawa Black Bears (NLL) (2024–2026); Ottawa Charge (PWHL) (2026–present)

Website
- canadiantirecentre.com

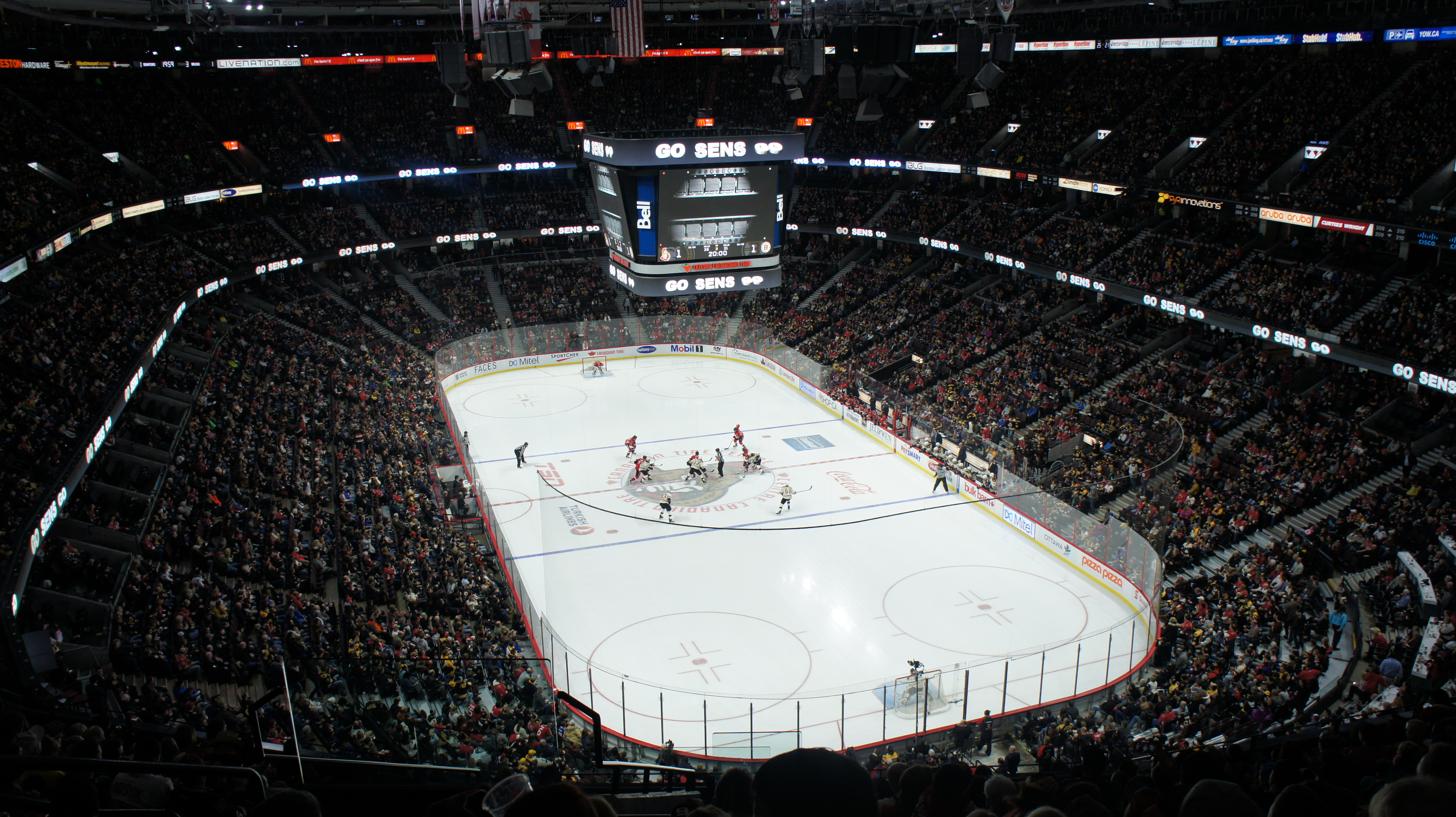
Canadian Tire Centre during an Ottawa Senators game

Canadian Tire Centre (French: Centre Canadian Tire) is a multi-purpose arena in the suburb of Kanata in Ottawa, Ontario, Canada. It opened on January 15, 1996 as the Palladium, and was also known as the Corel Centre from 1996 to 2006, and as Scotiabank Place from 2006 to 2013.

The arena is primarily used for ice hockey, serving as the home arena of the Ottawa Senators of the National Hockey League (NHL) since its opening in 1996, as well as the Ottawa Charge of the Professional Women's Hockey League (PWHL) since 2026. The arena formerly served as the temporary home for the Ottawa 67's of the Ontario Hockey League (OHL) from 2012 to 2014 during renovations at TD Place Arena, as well as the Ottawa Black Bears of the National Lacrosse League (NLL) from 2024 to 2026.

== History ==
As part of its bid to land a National Hockey League franchise for Ottawa, Terrace Corporation unveiled the original proposal for the arena development at a press conference in September 1989. The proposal included a hotel and 20,500-seat arena named the Palladium, on 100 acres (0.40 km^{2}) surrounded by a 500-acre (2.0 km^{2}) mini-city, named "West Terrace". The site itself, 600 acres (2.4 km^{2}) of farmland, then located on the western border of Kanata, had been acquired in May 1989 by Terrace. The large site had previously been a possible location for a new home for the Central Canada Exhibition, but the Exhibition's option on the property had expired. The arena's architectural design and seating bowl were closely inspired by The Palace of Auburn Hills which opened a few years prior in 1988 in Auburn Hills, Michigan. Both arenas were designed by Detroit-based Rossetti Architects.

The site was farmland and required a rezoning to proceed with construction. The then-City of Kanata supported the rezoning, but the provincial government and some local residents opposed the rezoning, forcing public hearings into the proposal by the Ontario Municipal Board. Rezoning approval was granted by the Board on August 28, 1991, with conditions. The conditions imposed by the board included a scaling down of the arena to 18,500 seats, a moratorium on development outside the initial 100-acre (0.40 km^{2}) arena site, and that the cost of the highway interchange Ontario Highway 417 be paid by Terrace. A ground-breaking ceremony was held in June 1992 but actual construction did not start until July 7, 1994.

The two-year period was used seeking financing for the site and interchange by Terrace Corporation. The corporation received a CA$6 million grant from the Canadian government, but needed to borrow to pay for the rest of the costs of construction. On August 17, 1993, Bruce Firestone, the Senators owner, was replaced by Rod Bryden, a former high tech tycoon, who assumed control of Terrace Corporation. Bryden borrowed enough to pay for the CA$188 million project through a consortium of U.S. banks and Ogden Entertainment, but could not find financing for the highway interchange. Only after the Ontario government provided a loan guarantee for the highway interchange financing did construction proceed.

Actual construction took 18 months, finishing in January 1996. The Palladium opened on January 15, 1996, with a concert by Canadian rocker Bryan Adams. The first NHL game took place two days later, with the Montreal Canadiens defeating the Ottawa Senators 3–0 with a sold-out crowd of 18,500 fans. On February 17, 1996, the name ''Palladium'' was changed to ''Corel Centre'', when Corel Corporation, an Ottawa software company, signed a ten-year deal for the naming rights.

In 2001, Kanata was merged into the City of Ottawa, thus bringing the arena officially into the Canadian capital. When mortgage holder Covanta Energy (the former Ogden Entertainment) went into receivership that year, Terrace was expected to pay off the whole debt. The ownership was not able to refinance the arena, eventually leading to Terrace filing for bankruptcy in 2003. However, on August 26, 2003, billionaire businessman Eugene Melnyk finalized the purchase of the Senators and the arena. The arena and club became solely owned by Melnyk through a new company, Capital Sports Properties.

In 2004, the ownership applied to expand its seating capacity. The City of Ottawa amended its bylaws in December 2004, and in 2005, the venue was allowed to increase its seating capacity to 19,153 and total capacity of 20,500 people including standing room. Also in 2005, the arena became home to the Ottawa Sports Hall of Fame, with a display on the second-floor concourse. Information regarding over 200 inductees is detailed on individual plaques. The exhibits display had previously been located at the Ottawa Civic Centre since 1967. The space is donated by the building. In 2011, it was announced that the Hall of Fame exhibit would move to a permanent space at the Heritage Building of the Ottawa City Hall.

On January 19, 2006, the arena changed its name to ''Scotiabank Place'', after reaching a new 15-year naming rights agreement with Canadian bank Scotiabank on January 11, 2006.

In 2012, Scotiabank Place hosted the 2012 NHL All-Star Game and installed a new high-definition scoreboard. From 2012 through 2014, the arena was also a temporary home for the Ottawa 67's due to renovations occurring at TD Place Arena.

Following the 2012–13 season, Melnyk sought to end the arena's relationship with Scotiabank as the bank was not a financial backer of his team, and Scotiabank agreed not to contest the deal's termination provided the club would not sell naming rights to another financial institution. On June 18, 2013, the Ottawa Senators announced that it had sold naming rights of the arena to the Canadian Tire Corporation: the arena was officially renamed as the ''Canadian Tire Centre'' on July 1, 2013.

During the 2015 summer, the Senators reduced its seating capacity to 18,694 (20,061 with standing room), then further down to 18,572 seats in April 2017. Team president Tom Anselmi argued that the venue was "probably a little bit too big for the market" and that reducing the capacity would lead to more sell-outs. The capacity was reduced even more to 17,373 seats (18,740 capacity) in September 2017, after owner Eugene Melnyk complained of not having enough sell-out crowds during the 2017 playoff home games. After one season of the reduction in 2018, the Senators decided to open up the tarp-covered seats, increasing the seating capacity to 18,655 for hockey games.

The Senators have been in discussions with the National Capital Commission to replace Canadian Tire Centre with a new arena located on federal land in downtown Ottawa since 2016. Talks initially broke down with a dispute with the Senators' partner on the proposal and were revived again after the passing of Senators' owner Eugene Melnyk and continue under the Senators' current ownership. A land sale agreement with the National Capital Commission was signed in August 2025.

On December 6, 2024, the first PWHL game at the arena was played between the Montreal Victoire and the Ottawa Charge. The Victoire won 2–1 in front of 11,065 fans.

During the 2025 off-season, the seating capacity was slightly reduced to 17,860, when the team replaced the 100-level seats which are slightly larger than the previous ones. In 2026, a new 'Fan Deck' for standing room replaced the upper level seats of the 300-level, reducing the seating further down to 17,010, while allowing an open bar area for people to congregate and view the hockey games. The zone is open to all attendees at games, with separate ticketing for selected events.

== Facilities ==
The arena has facilities for hockey and lacrosse games, which are held regularly. The arena has different configurations for concerts, with full and half arena seating arrangements. The building has six restaurants and a fitness club. Most of the restaurants are only open on game days. There are also several concession stands. The Ottawa Senators operate a merchandise store next to the east entrance.

Arena seating is in three levels, 100, 200 and 300, which are fixed sections surrounding the arena floor. The levels start with the 100 or "club" level closest to the ice surface rising further up and away to the 300 level. There are suites in the 100 level, 200 level and at the mezzanine level which is above the 300 level. The 100 level has its own concourse while levels 200 and 300 share a concourse. The Ottawa Sports Hall of Fame exhibit is on the 200/300 level concourse. The mezzanine level is only reachable by elevator. In late 2014, the Senators announced major renovations throughout the whole facility. Remodeled food outlets and 4K Video displays are only some parts of the $15 million renovation.

The arena is located in the west end of Ottawa, south of Huntmar Drive and Ontario Highway 417. It is accessible from the two highway interchanges of Palladium Drive and Terry Fox Drive. It is located 25 kilometres west of Downtown Ottawa. Ottawa's public transit provider OC Transpo provides special shuttle buses to the arena.

== Notable events ==
Canadian Tire Centre is the largest sport and concert venue in the National Capital Region after the outdoor TD Place Stadium. It regularly hosts major music acts, concerts, and sporting events. Some notable events include:

- Game 3 and 4 of the 2007 Stanley Cup Final
- Three world championship ice hockey tournaments, the 2009 World Junior Ice Hockey Championships, 2025 World Junior Ice Hockey Championships and the 2013 Women's World Hockey Championships
- The 2008 NHL entry draft
- The 2012 NHL All-Star Game
- The last NHL game Wayne Gretzky played in Canada
- The 2026 Walter Cup playoffs, home ice games for the Ottawa Charge
- The arena held a UFC event for the first time in 2019, hosting UFC Fight Night: Iaquinta vs. Cowboy
- 2008, 2009, 2010, 2013, 2014, Canadian University Basketball Championships
- 4 episodes of WWE Raw from 1997–2023, and seven episodes of WWE SmackDown from 2001–2016
- The arena hosted Billy Graham's final Canadian Crusade in June 1998. Total attendance for the four-day crusade was over 100,000.
- Concerts by AC/DC, Alanis Morissette, Avril Lavigne, Beastie Boys, Blue Rodeo, Bon Jovi, Bruno Mars, Bryan Adams, Ariana Grande, David Bowie, Depeche Mode, Drake, Kenny Chesney, Coldplay, Cypress Hill, Eagles, Foo Fighters, Genesis, Green Day, Elton John, Fifty Cent, Jay-Z, Justin Bieber, Kiss, Iron Maiden, Lady Gaga, LMFAO, Tina Turner, Madonna, Paul McCartney, Metallica, Mötley Crüe, Nelly, Nickelback, One Direction, Our Lady Peace, Pearl Jam, Katy Perry, Ozzy Osbourne, Prince, Rihanna, Rage Against the Machine, Rod Stewart, Roger Waters, Rush, Ed Sheeran, Snoop Dogg, Britney Spears, Bruce Springsteen, Barbra Streisand, Taylor Swift, Justin Timberlake, The Tragically Hip, Shania Twain, Shawn Mendes, U2, Usher, Carrie Underwood, Van Halen, The Weeknd, Neil Young, The Smashing Pumpkins, Twenty One Pilots, and over 12 shows by Celine Dion, Fleetwood Mac, and Cher.

== See also ==
- List of indoor arenas in Canada
- New Ottawa Arena

Preceded by Ottawa Civic Centre	Home of the Ottawa Senators; 1996 – present	Succeeded by current
Preceded by RBC Center	Host of the NHL All-Star Game; 2012	Succeeded by Nationwide Arena
