= Ralph Wallace Burton =

Canadian artist (1905–1983)

- Born: Ralph Wallace Burton; 1905; Newington, Stormont County, Ontario, Canada
- Died: 1983 (aged 77–78); Ottawa, Ontario, Canada
- Education: Ottawa, Ontario (1923-24); and the Banff School of Fine Arts as a student of A.Y. Jackson (1947)
- Known for: Painter
- Notable work: Reflection on the Road, Richmond, Ontario (1970); The Sun Drawing Water (1977); Bennett Lake, Ontario near Perth (1975); and AYJ Snoozing With Paper in Hand in Hotel Room, Calabogie ON 1960 at the Ottawa Art Gallery; Rolling Hills at the Tom Thomson Memorial Art Gallery; Old Yukon Hotel and Anglican Church, Dawson, YT (1964) at the Dawson City Museum; and selections from his Lebreton Flats series hanging in Ottawa City Hall.
- Movement: Student of A.Y. Jackson from the Group of Seven; Often painted in the Ottawa Valley region with A.Y. Jackson, Maurice Haycock and Stuart D. Helmsley.
- Patrons: James Coyne, former Governor of the Bank of Canada

Ralph Wallace Burton (1905–1983) was an Ottawa Valley artist who was a student of, regular painting companion and friend to A.Y. Jackson from the Group of Seven.

His many paintings and sketches, now housed at the City of Ottawa archives, small galleries and private collections, celebrate the rough beauty of Canadian landscapes and the tenacity of man-made structures set in rugged natural and urban environments, particularly in the Ottawa Valley region.

== Professional career ==
Burton produced numerous sketches and paintings over his lifetime, with many of his finest executed in oil on birch plywood panels. He studied art professionally in Ottawa (1923–1924) and was a student under A.Y. Jackson at the Banff School of Fine Arts (1947).

He later became a friend and painting companion to A.Y. Jackson, who greatly influenced his work. Over a period spanning more than 20 years, they travelled the lengths of Eastern Ontario and Quebec, as well as Alberta, Alaska and the Yukon territory together, depicting the environs, physical structures and, less frequently, the people of the regions they visited.

Burton was also widely regarded in the Ottawa region as a skilled art teacher, with one student remarking on Burton's "love of colour," "assured draughtsmanship" and "powerful observation" evident in his works. Another student and art historian observes that Burton's works are "very rhythmical...straight lines were rare, things are always flowing and moving through his brush strokes and the variation in colours."

During his art career, Burton often had to juggle full- and part-time work to support his family. As one biographical sketch recounts, "Ralph began using his art as a bartering tool to acquire food, fuel, make car repairs – everything necessary for survival." He also occasionally took on commissions for calendars and Christmas cards. During World War II, Burton enlisted in the RCAF and worked in Ottawa as an administrative war art officer.

== Works ==
Burton is often referred to as a plein air artist whose body of work focuses largely on natural Canadian landscapes in formidable climates. However, he was a prolific painter who also enjoyed rendering cityscapes and capturing the play of colour, form and light of exterior structures. The most widely viewed of his paintings today are from his Lebreton Flats series.

Lebreton Flats was once a working-class neighbourhood in Ottawa's west end that saw its land expropriated in the 1960s by the Federal government and slated for demolition and urban renewal. The area was deemed slum land that needed to be cleared, but Burton saw the area as a vibrant and hard-working neighbourhood. As one art historian put it, "Working just ahead of the demolition crews, Ralph Burton produced a series of small oil sketches that document the final months of Lebreton Flats...[and he] rendered these architectural portraits with powerful observation." They also noted that while Burton's artistic style is generally described as "free" and "abbreviated," he was nevertheless "a meticulous recorder of architectural detail."

Several of Burton's works are available for public viewing in small galleries across the country. The Ottawa Art Gallery houses his Bennett Lake, Ontario near Perth (1975, oil on plywood); Sun Drawing Water (1977, oil on plywood); Reflection on the Road, Richmond, Ontario (1970, oil on panel) and AYJ Snoozing With Paper in Hand in Hotel Room, Calabogie ON 1960 (oil on plywood). Rolling Hills is on display at the Tom Thomson Memorial Art Gallery, a bequest of A.Y. Jackson; The Dawson City Museum and Historical Society houses his Old Yukon Hotel and Anglican Church, Dawson City, YT (1964). The Canadian Embassy in Washington also has some of his art work on display.

Other of his many works reside in personal collections or are housed in the City of Ottawa's archives. Selections from more than 30 of his paintings from the Lebreton Flats series are hanging in the hallways of Ottawa City Hall (Heritage Building, Champlain Room).

In December 2007, the John A. Libby Gallery celebrated Ralph Burton's contribution with a retrospective of his major works and published a biographical booklet on his life and work.

In March 2010, a popular blog on Ottawa architecture and urban design created a meticulous photo-essay of Burton's Lebreton Flats series, comparing photos of the region from past and present with Burton's artistic legacy.

During his lifetime, Burton displayed his works frequently at the Wallack Gallery in Ottawa.

The Ottawa Art Gallery houses a portrait of Burton at work done by A.Y. Jackson entitled simply, Ralph Burton (graphite on paper, 1965).

== See also ==
- A.Y. Jackson
- Banff School of Fine Arts
- Group of Seven (painters)
- List of Canadian artists
- List of Canadian painters
- Ottawa Valley
