= Henry George Glyde =

Canadian artist (1906–1998)

- Born: June 18, 1906; Luton, Bedfordshire, England, U.K.
- Died: March 31, 1998 (aged 91); Victoria, British Columbia, Canada
- Education: Royal College of Art (1926–1930)
- Occupations: Painter and art educator

Henry George Glyde RCA (June 18, 1906 – March 31, 1998) was an English-born Canadian painter, draftsperson and art educator.

== Teaching career ==
Born in Luton, England, Glyde attended the Royal College of Art in London, England (1926–1930) was a student instructor at the school (1929–1930), then was an art instructor at other schools. He came to Canada in 1935 to teach drawing in Calgary at the Provincial Institute of Technology and Art and in 1936 became head of the art department. From then on, he explored western Canada as a painting subject. He was also head of the painting division of the Banff School of Fine Arts (1937–1966) where he met A.Y. Jackson and, in 1943, the two artists went north, with a commission from the National Gallery to create studies of the Alaska Highway.

In 1937, he began teaching community art classes with the Department of Extension, University of Alberta, where he went on to establish the Department of Fine Art. He taught there between 1946 and 1966.

== Art career ==
Glyde was known as a master draftsperson. His oils and murals might be called social realism. His murals are classical in mood and content. The emphasis on structure is evident in his interpretation of the Alberta landscape and the British Columbia coast. His painting Imperial Wildcat No. 3, Excelsior Field, near Edmonton appeared on a $1 stamp in a set of issued by Canada in 1967 to coincide with that year's celebration of the nation's Centennial. A major retrospective exhibition was produced by the Glenbow Museum in 1987. He was a member of the Canadian Society of Graphic Art, the Alberta Society of Artists (president in 1945), the Federation of Canadian Artists, and was made a full member of the Royal Canadian Academy of Arts in 1949. His RCA diploma piece, Prairie Town (1949) shows a small regional community, his inspiration.

He died on March 31, 1998, in Victoria, British Columbia, Canada.
