= LeBreton Flats arena =

Planned indoor arena in Ottawa, Ontario

New Ottawa Arena
- Rendering of the arena
- Interactive map of New Ottawa Arena
- Location: Ottawa, Ontario, Canada
- Coordinates: 45.411737°N 75.717783°W
- Capacity: TBD
- Type: Arena
- Public transit: Pimisi; Bayview

Construction
- Groundbreaking: TBD
- Opened: TBD
- Architect: TBD

Tenant
- Ottawa Senators (NHL) (TBD)

The LeBreton Flats arena is a planned indoor arena to be located in the LeBreton Flats district of Ottawa, Ontario, Canada. It will be the future home of the Ottawa Senators of the National Hockey League (NHL) and part of a mixed-use development slated for the area.

== History ==
The Ottawa Senators of the NHL were established in 1992. At first the team played at the Ottawa Civic Centre in the Glebe sector of Ottawa until a new arena could be built. The Senators ownership acquired land in suburban Kanata, Ontario, (up until 2001, an independent city west of Ottawa, now part of Ottawa) roughly 24 kilometres (15 mi) from downtown Ottawa. Opened in January 1996, the Palladium (now Canadian Tire Centre) became the home for the Senators. In April 2016, the Senators-backed RendezVous LeBreton Group was awarded the development rights to LeBreton Flats by the National Capital Commission (NCC). In late 2018, partnership issues had developed between RendezVous LeBreton Group and Trinity Development Group, one of its partners. Finally, in December 2018, the NCC ended its agreement with RendezVous LeBreton Group allowing for a grace period if a settlement could be reached.

On June 23, 2022, the Senators-led Capital Sports Development Inc came to agreement with the National Capital Commission on a new plan with new partners for the development of the arena.

In 2023, the Mayor of Ottawa Mark Sutcliffe indicated that other locations remained under consideration, and NHL commissioner Gary Bettman acknowledged that the decision process was ongoing even after the preliminary deal signing for LeBreton Flats. In April 2024, Sutcliffe reinterred the idea of other possible locations for the area like an underused office properties that the federal government was looking to offload in downtown Ottawa. However, Senators president Cyril Leeder told the Ottawa Board of Trade that LeBreton Flats location was the only site the team was seriously considering.

On September 20, 2024, the NCC reached an agreement in principle with the Senators to sell a little over 10 acres (4.0 ha) of land in LeBreton Flats to Capital Sports Development Inc with the plan to develop the area including a new arena for the team. A land sale agreement for LeBreton Flats, was signed in August 2025 with the NCC for CA$30 million (US$24 million). In March 2026, the Senators and the Algonquin Anishinabe Nation, which comprises Kichi Sibi, Kitigan Zibi, Pikwàkanagàn, Abitibiwinni, Apitipi Anicinapek, Barriere Lake, Kebaowek, Kitcisakik, Lac Simon, Long Point, Timiskaming and Wolf Lake, announced that they established an economic partnership.
