= Radium Mine =

1938 painting by A. Y. Jackson

Radium Mine is a painting made by Canadian artist A.Y. Jackson when he visited the mine-site of the isolated Radium mine at Port Radium, Northwest Territories, in 1938. Jackson was a friend of prospector Gilbert LaBine, then the mine manager, and flew to the site with him.

== Significance ==
When the painting came up for auction on November 22, 2012, it was described as "historically significant". The painting was held privately by the LaBine family, prior to the auction, and had been available for public viewing only once. It was expected to sell for as much as $300,000 CAD.

== Second painting ==
Jackson is known to have composed several other paintings during his many visits to Port Radium. It was purchased by a private owner, whose estate donated it to the National Gallery of Canada in 1939.

Art historian John O'brian, an expert on Jackson's work, said he had been unaware of the existence of the painting.

Extra interest in the painting was triggered by the mine being the prime source of Uranium for the atomic bomb used in World War II.
