= Fleet Street Pumping Station =

Coordinates: 45.416099°N 75.710853°W

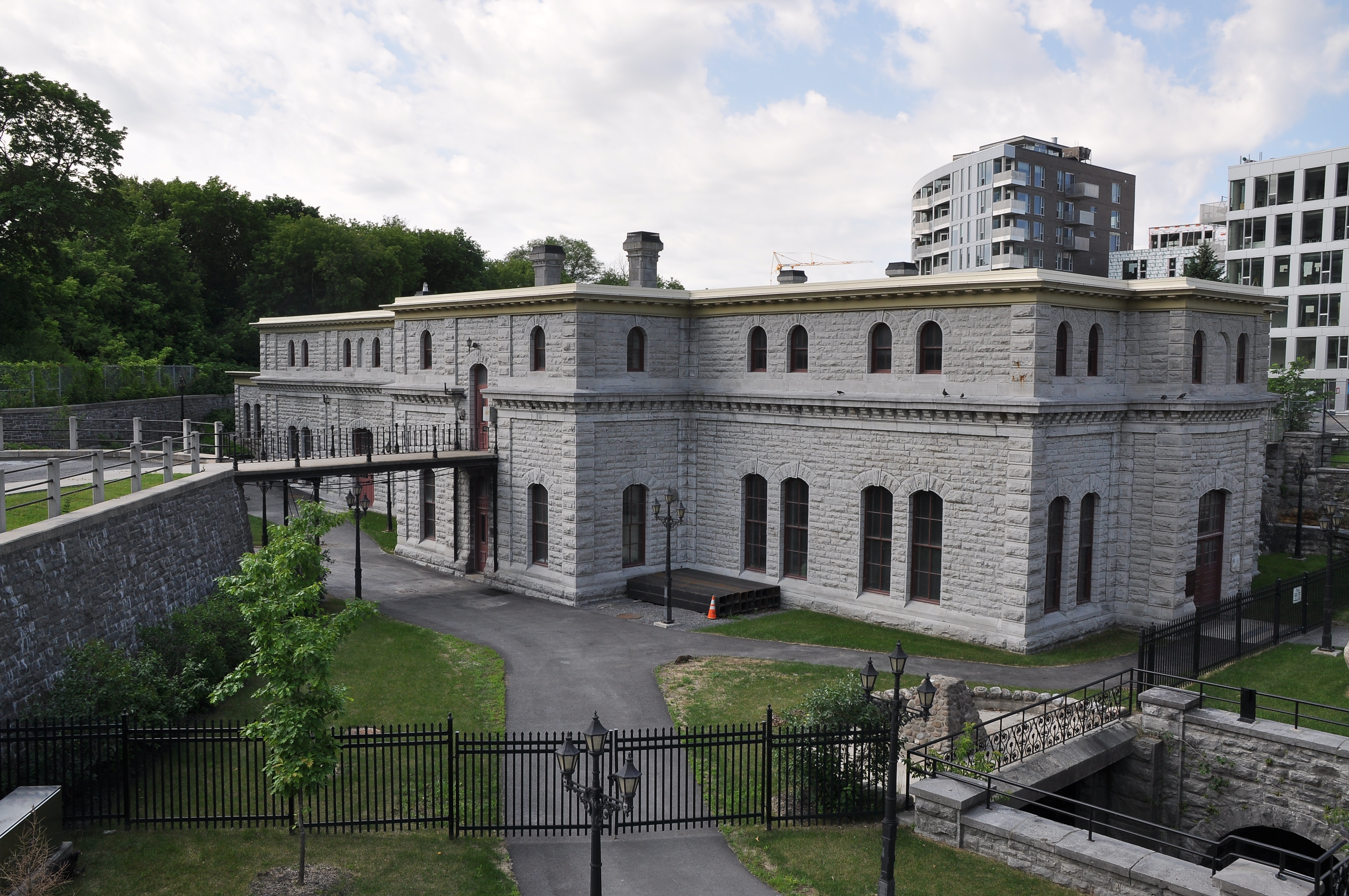
The Fleet Street Pumping Station

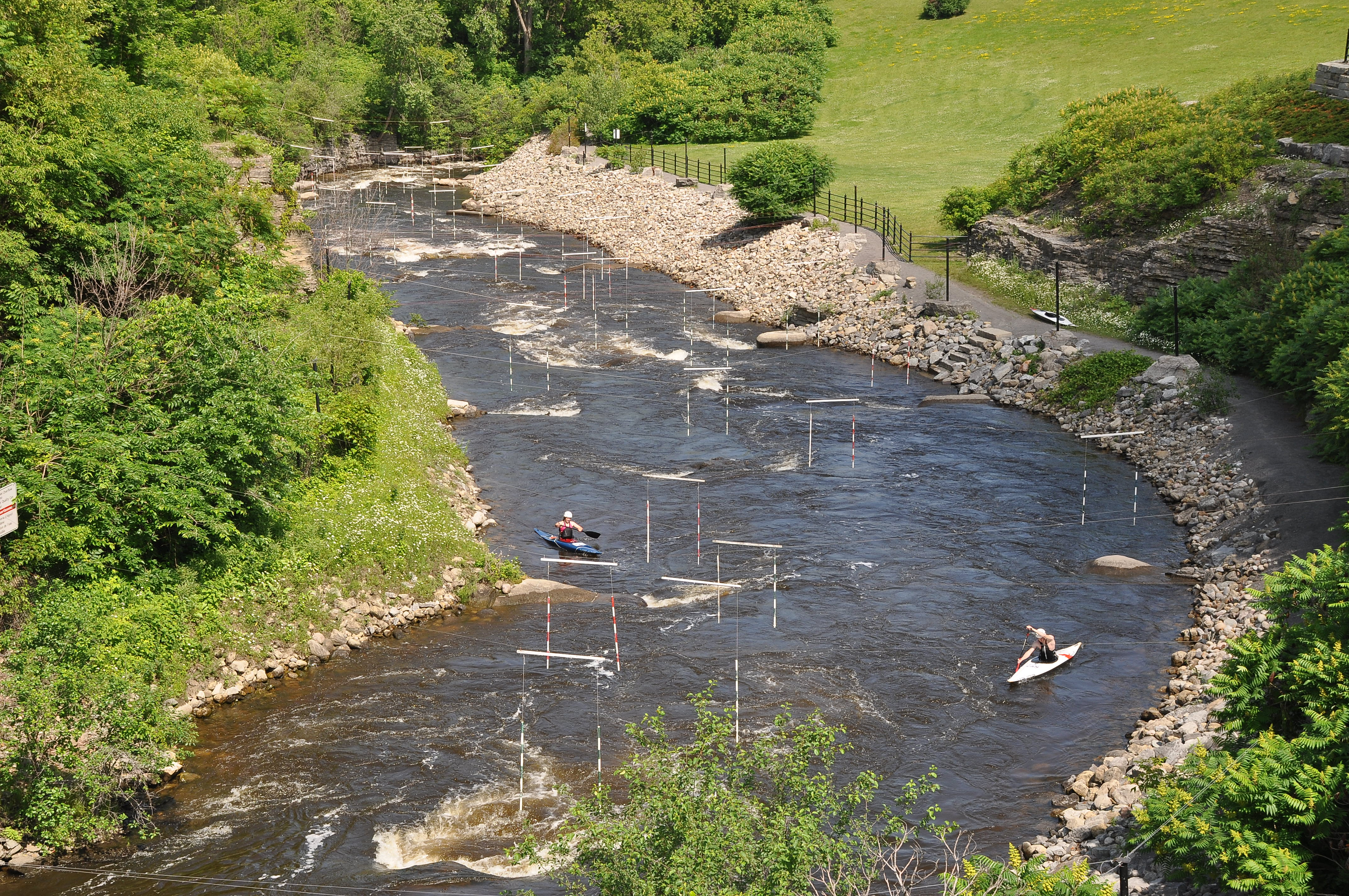
The Pumphouse Whitewater Course

The Fleet Street Pumping Station is a historic water pumping station in Ottawa, Ontario, Canada. It is west of downtown in the LeBreton Flats area, near the new Canadian War Museum.

The building was opened in 1875 as Ottawa's first pumping station, pumping unfiltered water from the Ottawa River into the city's new water distribution system. The station was designed by Thomas Keefer, who designed water systems for many cities in Canada. It has been expanded several times since its construction. Ottawa now has two water purification plants: one on Lemieux Island opened in 1922, and one at Britannia, which opened in 1961. These two plants produce 275 million litres of water every day.

The Fleet Street PS still plays an important role in the city's water distribution system. The pumping station, designated as heritage in 1982 under the Ontario Heritage Act, uses hydraulic power to pump water and is the only one of its kind in Canada still in operation. In 1981, it was recognized by the AWWA with the American/Canadian/Mexican Landmarks Award.

The discharge from the station provides a class 2 whitewater site used by canoe and kayak enthusiasts.
