= A. Y. Jackson =

Canadian painter (1882–1974)

A. Y. Jackson CC CMG RCA
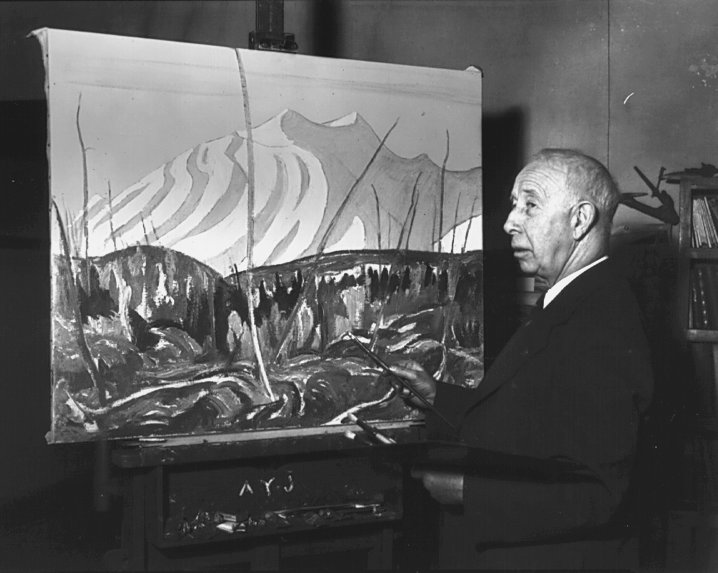
- Jackson at work in the Studio Building, Toronto, 1944
- Born: Alexander Young Jackson; October 3, 1882; Montreal, Quebec, Canada
- Died: April 5, 1974 (aged 91); Kleinburg, Ontario, Canada
- Education: Monument-National, Art Institute of Chicago, Académie Julian
- Known for: Painter
- Movement: Group of Seven

Alexander Young Jackson CC CMG RCA LL. D. (October 3, 1882 – April 5, 1974) was a Canadian painter and a founding member of the Group of Seven. Jackson made a significant contribution to the development of art in Canada, and was instrumental in bringing together the artists of Montreal and Toronto. In addition to his work with the Group of Seven, his long career included serving as a war artist during World War I (1917–1919) and teaching at the Banff School of Fine Arts, from 1943 to 1949. In his later years he was artist-in-residence at the McMichael Canadian Art Collection in Kleinburg, Ontario.

== Early life and training ==
Jackson was born in Montreal, the son of Eliza Georgina (Young) and Henry Allen Jackson. As a young boy, Jackson worked as an office boy for a lithograph company, after his father abandoned his family of six children. It was at this company that Jackson began his art training. In the evenings, he took classes at the Art Association of Montreal (1902).

In 1905, Jackson worked his way to Europe on a cattle boat, returning by the same means and travelling on to Chicago. In Chicago, he joined a commercial art firm and took courses at the Chicago Art Institute. He saved his earnings and, by 1907, was able to visit France to study Impressionism. In France, Jackson decided to become a professional painter, studying at the Académie Julian in Paris with J. P. Laurens. Some of his most important artistic development was at the Étaples art colony, which he first visited in 1908 with his New Zealand friend Eric Spencer Macky. Jackson painted his Paysage Embrumé then and, to his surprise, it was accepted by the Paris Salon. Returning in 1912, he stayed with the Australian Arthur Baker-Clack (1877–1955). From this period date the Impressionist Sand dunes at Cucq and Autumn in Picardy, in both of which he used brushstrokes of high-keyed colour. Autumn in Picardy was bought by the National Gallery of Canada in 1913.

== Professional career ==
Red Maple (1914), by A. Y. Jackson

When Jackson returned to Canada, he settled in Sweetsburg, Quebec, where he began painting works such as the Impressionistic Edge of the Maple Wood. He held his first exhibition at the Art Association of Montreal with Randolph Hewton in 1913. Unable to make ends meet and discouraged by the Canadian art scene, he considered moving to the United States. However, he received a letter from J. E. H. MacDonald which changed his mind. MacDonald inquired about the Edge of the Maple Wood, which he had seen at a Toronto art show, informing Jackson that Toronto artist Lawren Harris wanted to purchase the painting if he still owned it.

After the purchase, Jackson struck up a correspondence with the two Toronto artists, often debating on topics related to Canadian art. Jackson soon began visiting Toronto. Dr. James MacCallum convinced Jackson to relocate to Toronto by offering to buy enough of his paintings for one year to guarantee him a living income. He moved into the Studio Building which was financed by Lawren Harris and Dr. James MacCallum. Harris, overseeing construction of the building, was too busy to concentrate on his own artistic endeavours and loaned his own studio space, over the Commerce Bank branch at the northwest corner of Yonge and Bloor streets, to the newly arrived Montrealer, A. Y. Jackson. The spot is now occupied by the 34-storey 2 Bloor West.

Jackson was a welcome addition to the Toronto art scene, having traveled in Europe and bringing with him a respected – though as yet not particularly successful – talent. The canvas taking shape while he waited to move into the Studio Building, Terre Sauvage, became one of his most famous. In January 1914 the Studio Building was ready for occupation. Tom Thomson was another of the first residents of the building and shared a studio with Jackson for a year. Like the other Group of Seven painters, Jackson embraced landscape themes and sought to develop a bold style. An avid outdoorsman, Jackson became good friends with Tom Thomson, and the duo often fished and sketched together, beginning with a trip to Algonquin Park in fall 1914. Inspired by Thomson, Jackson and the other painters who would one day be known as the Group of Seven undertook trips to Algonquin Park, Georgian Bay, Algoma and the North Shore.

With the outbreak of World War I, Jackson enlisted in the Canadian Army's 60th battalion in 1915. Soon after he reached the front he was wounded at the Battle of Sanctuary Wood in June 1916 and found himself once more at Étaples in the hospital there. While recovering from his injuries, he came to the attention of Lord Beaverbrook. He was then transferred to the Canadian War Records branch as an artist. Here, Jackson would create important pictures of events connected with the war. He later worked for the Canadian War Memorials as an official war artist from 1917 to 1919. Jackson produced forty-five artworks for the organization, including the powerful A Copse, Evening (1918)--a grim depiction of the catastrophic effects of the First World War on the Belgian landscape. A large number of his war paintings are in the Canadian War Museum in Ottawa.

On his return from WWI, Jackson again took up residence at the Studio Building. He removed Tom Thomson's easel, made by Thomson's own hand, from his studio and used it for all the subsequent pictures he produced in the Studio Building. Shortly after he returned from wintering on Georgian Bay, he learned that in his absence he had been included in an informal group of Studio Building artists, exhibiting for the first time, called the Group of Seven.

The Beaver Hall Group was formed in Montreal in May 1920 with A. Y. Jackson as president. In his opening speech, Jackson emphasized the right of the artist to paint what they feel "with utter disregard for what has hitherto been considered requisite to the acceptance of the work at the recognized art exhibitions in Canadian centres. "Schools and 'isms' do not trouble us", he maintained, "individual expression is our chief concern". He identified its goals as being those of the Group of Seven, and over the years Jackson maintained the contact between Toronto and Montreal, supporting and stimulating the Montreal artists through regular visits, painting with artists such as Albert H. Robinson and others at various scenic locations, and correspondence. He kept them informed of events in Toronto and arranged for their works to be included in the Group of Seven exhibitions. It is through this kind of contact that he made lifelong friends of Beaver Hall artists Anne Savage, Sarah Robertson and Kathleen Morris.

Jackson enjoyed painting landscapes from his native Quebec and did so for many years. Beginning in late February 1921, and for more than two decades, A.Y. Jackson explored the many topographies and villages of the Lower Saint Lawrence. He first visited Baie-Saint-Paul on the north shore in 1923. In his autobiography, he wrote:

at first, in my painting, I was interested in the old farm houses, in the barns and the trees. Later it was snow that captured my attention; the sun and the wind continually changed its colours and texture.

In 1932, Jackson depicted the Falconbridge smelter near Sudbury, in his painting Smoke Fantasy. He then began efforts at government lobbying, pleading in a letter to the minister of Lands and Forests William Finlayson to preserve from logging what became Killarney Provincial Park and Trout Lake. The latter was renamed O.S.A. Lake in honour of the Ontario Society of Artists which had taken it into trust. Jackson's efforts were rewarded with the naming of a lake after him on his 90th birthday.

In 1938, Jackson visited the mine-site of the isolated Radium mine at Port Radium, Northwest Territories, in 1938. Jackson was a friend of prospector Gilbert LaBine, then the mine manager, and flew to the site with him, where he painted Radium Mine.

During the Second World War, Jackson became one of the central figures in the development of the Canadian War Art Program in 1943. Working with the National Gallery of Canada, he played a pivotal role in organizing the largest public art project in Canadian history: the Sampson-Matthews silkscreen print program in 1942.

Jackson left the Studio Building in 1955 with Lawren Harris mourning, in a letter from Vancouver, "Your moving from the Studio Building marks the end of an era, the one era of creative art that has the greatest significance for Canada... You were the real force and inspiration that led all of us into a modern conception that suited this country, and the last to leave the home base of operations."

== Group of Seven ==
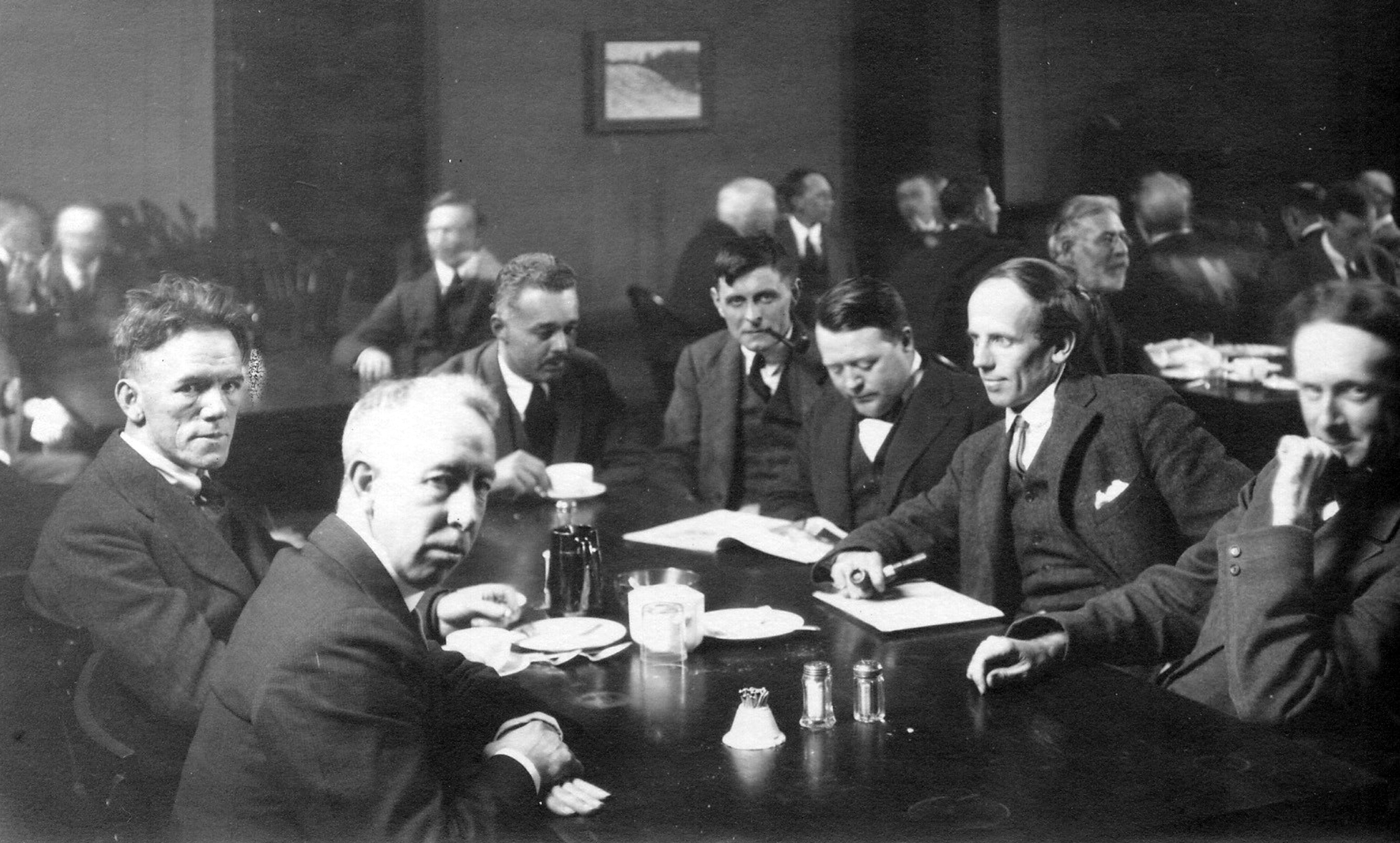
Group of seven artists: Frederick Varley, A. Y. Jackson, Lawren Harris, Fairley, Frank Johnston (artist), Arthur Lismer, and J. E. H. MacDonald

In 1919, Jackson and six painter colleagues formed the Group of Seven. These artists were considered to be bold, because the Canadian northern landscape had previously been considered too rugged and wild to be painted. Like the other members of the Group of Seven many of his works began as tiny en plein air sketches in oil on hardboard. Although his name is conventionally associated with this group, he would also remain something of a loner throughout his life.

In 1925, he taught at the Ontario College of Art in Toronto; this was the only year that he missed his annual spring trip to Quebec. In 1933, Jackson, along with Harris, was a founding member of the Canadian Group of Painters. Several members of the Group of Seven became members of this group, including A. J. Casson, Arthur Lismer and Franklin Carmichael.

== Later years ==
In 1943, Jackson first traveled to the Yukon with Henry George Glyde. He returned to the Yukon in 1964, this time with fellow artists Ralph Burton and Maurice Haycock, traveling by plane over the landscape. In 1954 he was one of 18 Canadian artists commissioned by the Canadian Pacific Railway to paint a mural for the interior of one of the new Park cars entering service on the new Canadian transcontinental train. Each the murals depicted a different national or provincial park; Jackson's was Kokanee Glacier Provincial Park. In 1953, a major retrospective titled A. Y. Jackson: Paintings 1901–1953 was held at the Art Gallery of Ontario and National Gallery of Canada of his work. Jackson moved to the Ottawa region in 1955, settling in Manotick. He maintained a studio in downtown Ottawa from 1963 to 1968.

He was often accompanied on his peripatetic painting trips by artists such as Albert H. Robinson and Randolph Hewton. In his later years, on trips to the Ottawa Valley region, the Gatineau Hills, the Lievre River Valley and Ripond he was accompanied by friend, painter and former student Ralph Wallace Burton, and fellow painters Maurice Haycock and Stuart D. Helmsley. One such venture almost ended in disaster: "[I]n the 1950s, when Ralph and A.Y. were painting on the banks of the Ottawa River at Deux Rivieres, a bullet ricocheted off a rock where Jackson was sitting."

In 1958, he published A Painter's Country, an autobiography dedicated to the memory of Group of Seven member J. E. H. MacDonald, who "visualized a Canadian school of painting and devoted his life to the realization of it".

In 1964, Jackson submitted his own design during the Great Flag Debate. It was similar in design to the Pearson Pennant.

In 1965, Jackson had a serious stroke that put an end to his painting career. He recuperated at the home of friend and painter Ralph Wallace Burton, and later moved to the McMichael Conservation Estate in Kleinburg, Ontario. Jackson died in 1974, over the Easter holiday in a nursing home in Toronto. He is buried on the grounds of the McMichael Canadian Art Collection. His niece Naomi Jackson Groves published several books about his life and work including Two Jacksons (2000), an account of a shared trip through France and Germany in 1936.

== Honours ==
- In 1941, Queen's University, Kingston gave Jackson an LL.D.
- In 1946 Jackson was appointed a Companion of the Order of St Michael and St George.
- In 1962, the University of Saskatchewan gave Jackson an LL.D.
- In 1967 Jackson was appointed a Companion of the Order of Canada.
- A. Y. Jackson Secondary School in Toronto was named after Jackson. He attended the opening of the school in 1970.
- A. Y. Jackson Secondary School in Ottawa is also named after him and opened in 1976.
- In 1970, the Royal Canadian Academy awarded Jackson its medal for lifetime achievement.
- The A. Y. Jackson Lookout on Highway 144 in Sudbury overlooks the waterfall depicted in Jackson's 1953 painting Spring on the Onaping River.
- The Ottawa River Institute has established an A. Y. Jackson Trail in his honour.

== Quotes from A. Y. Jackson ==
Of Algoma, he wrote:

Sketching here demanded a quick decision in composition, an ignoring or summarizing of much of the detail, a searching‒out of significant form, and a colour analysis that must never err on the side of timidity. One must know the north country intimately to appreciate the great variety of its forms. The impression of monotony that one receives from a train is soon dissipated when one gets into the bush. To fall into a formula for interpreting it is hardly possible.

== Paintings ==
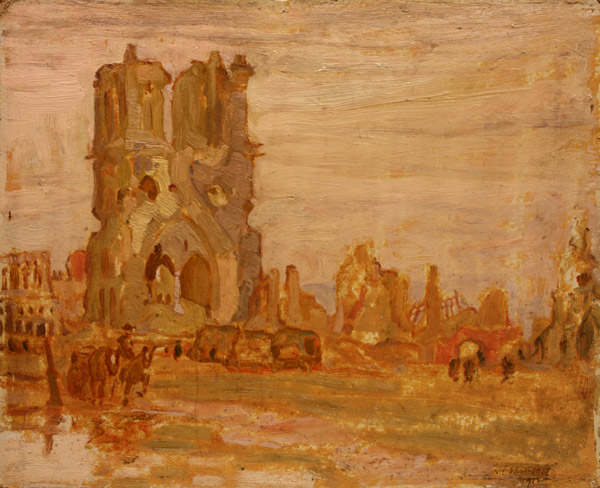
Cathedral at Ypres, Belgium, 1917, McMichael Canadian Art Collection, Kleinburg, Ontario

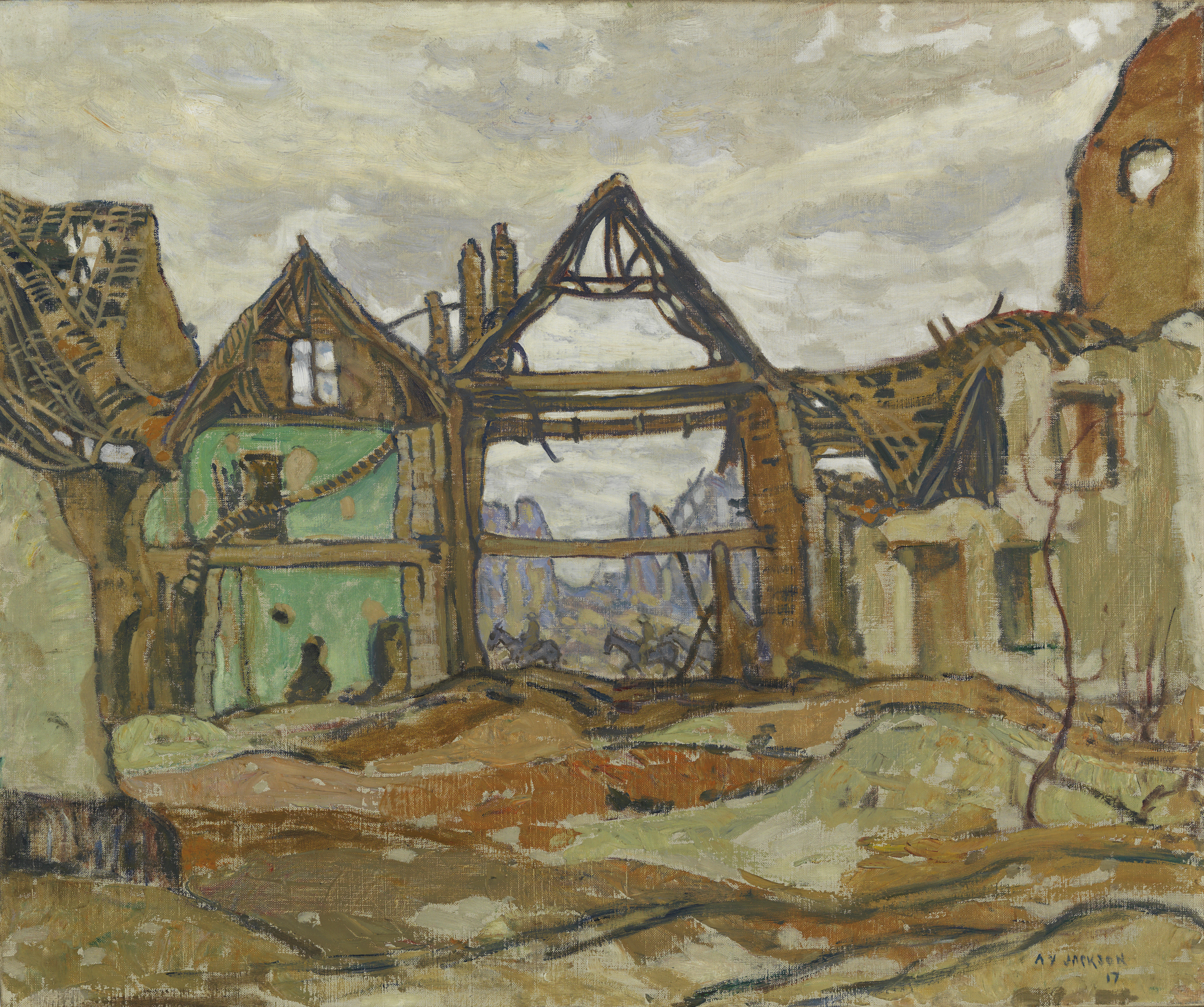
House of Ypres, 1917–1918, Canadian War Museum, Ottawa, Ontario

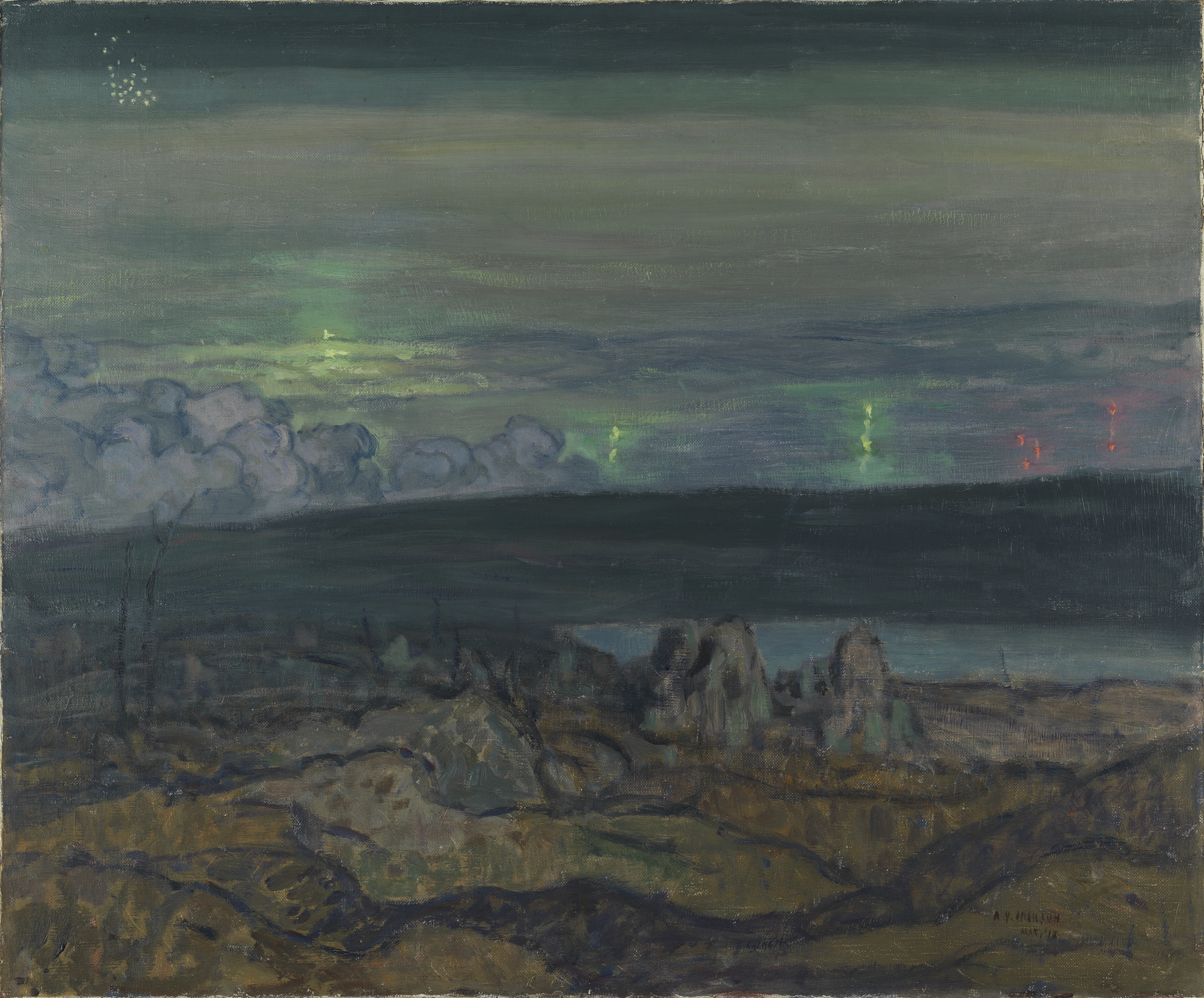
Gas Attack, Lievin, 1918, Canadian War Museum, Ottawa, Ontario

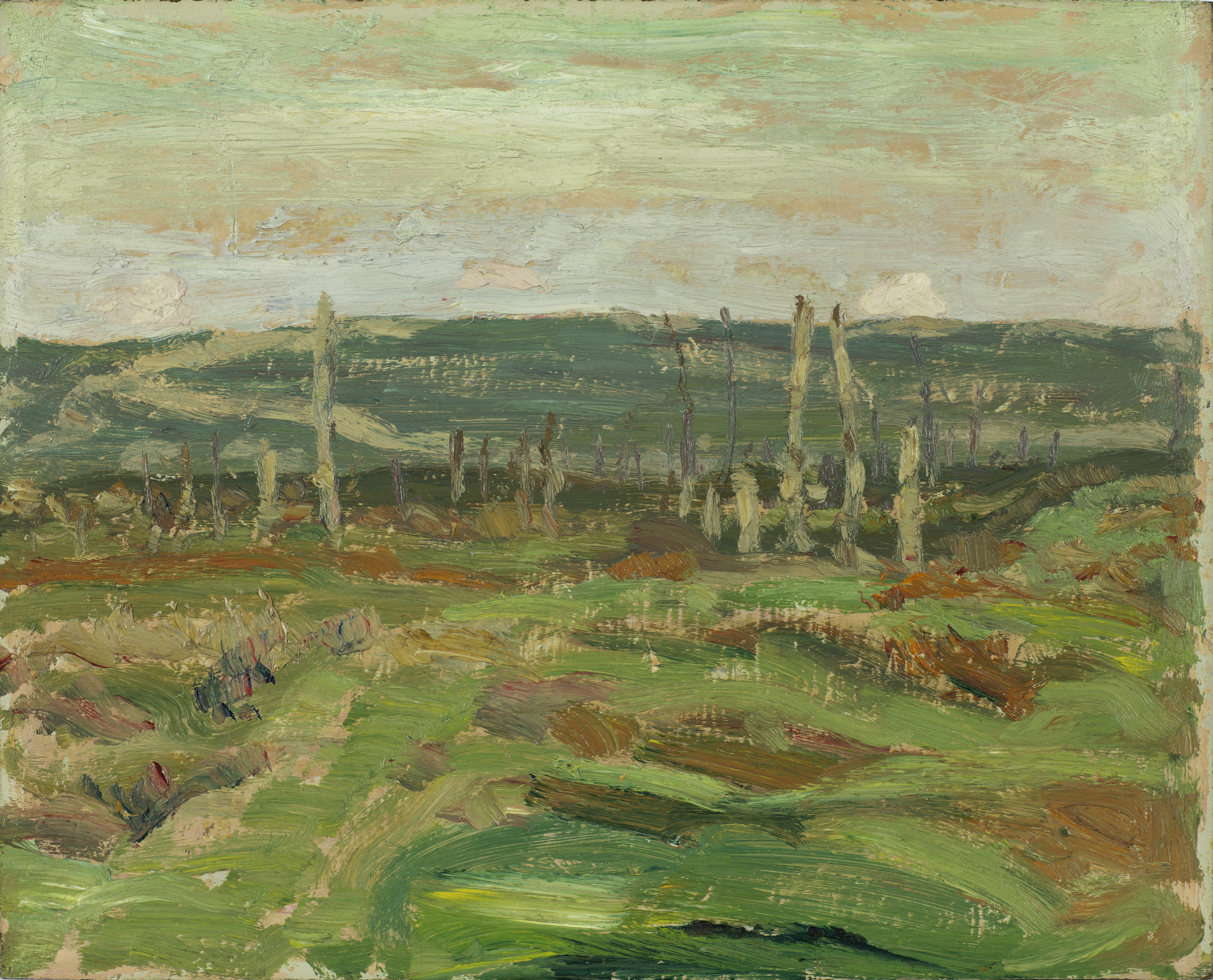
Vimy Ridge from Souchez Valley, 1917, Canadian War Museum, Ottawa, Ontario

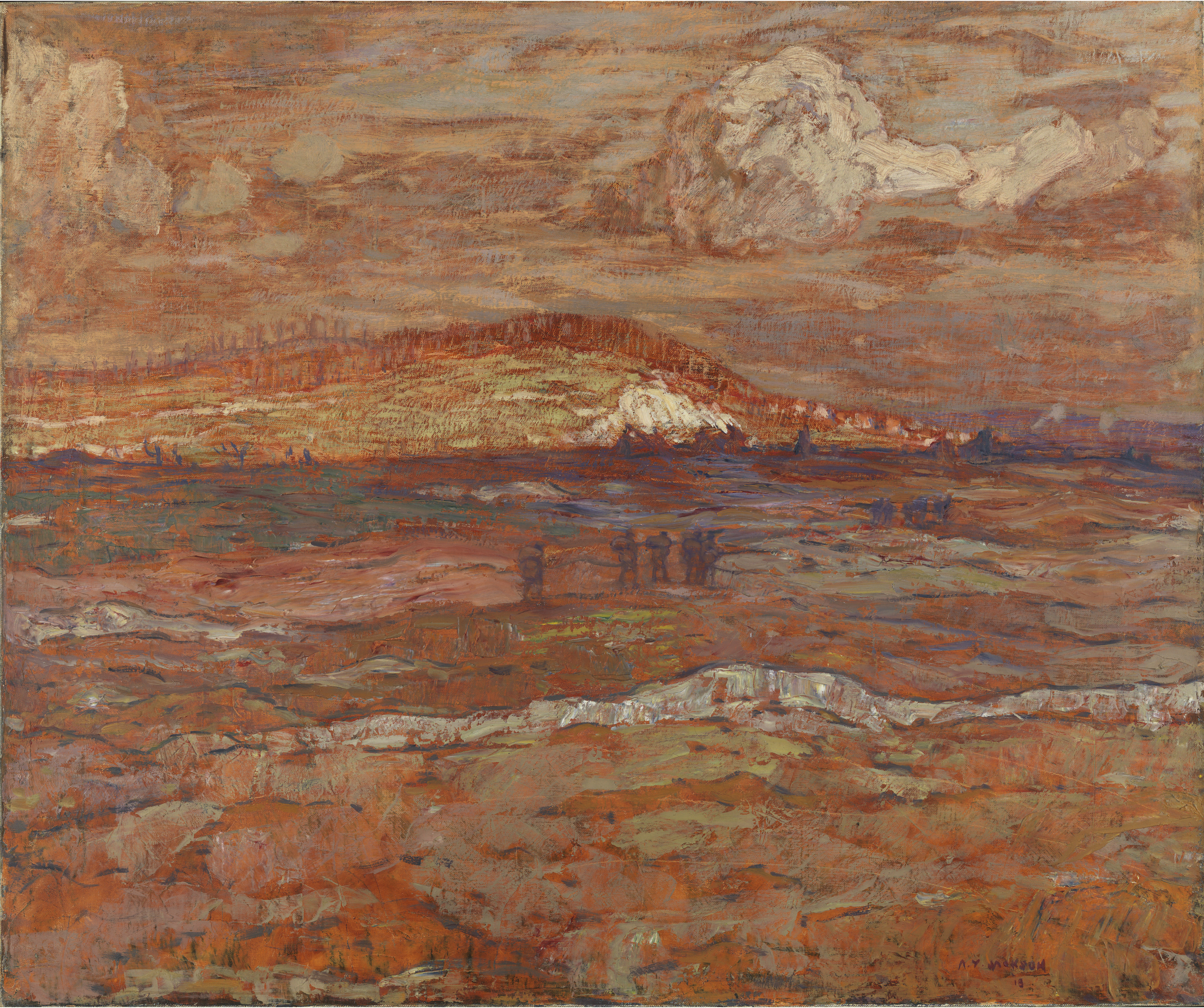
The Pimple, Evening, 1918, Canadian War Museum, Ottawa, Ontario

== Legacy ==
In 2025, Jackson's Wars: A. Y. Jackson before the Group of Seven, an examination of the work of the painter in the decade before the Group of Seven's formation in 1920, was held at the McMichael Canadian Art Collection in Kleinburg, co-curated by historian Douglas Hunter and Sarah Milroy.

== See more ==
- Canadian official war artists
- War art
- The Studio Building, Toronto, the home and working studio of several Group of Seven painters
