= LeBreton Flats =

LeBreton Flats Plaines Lebreton (French)
- Neighbourhood
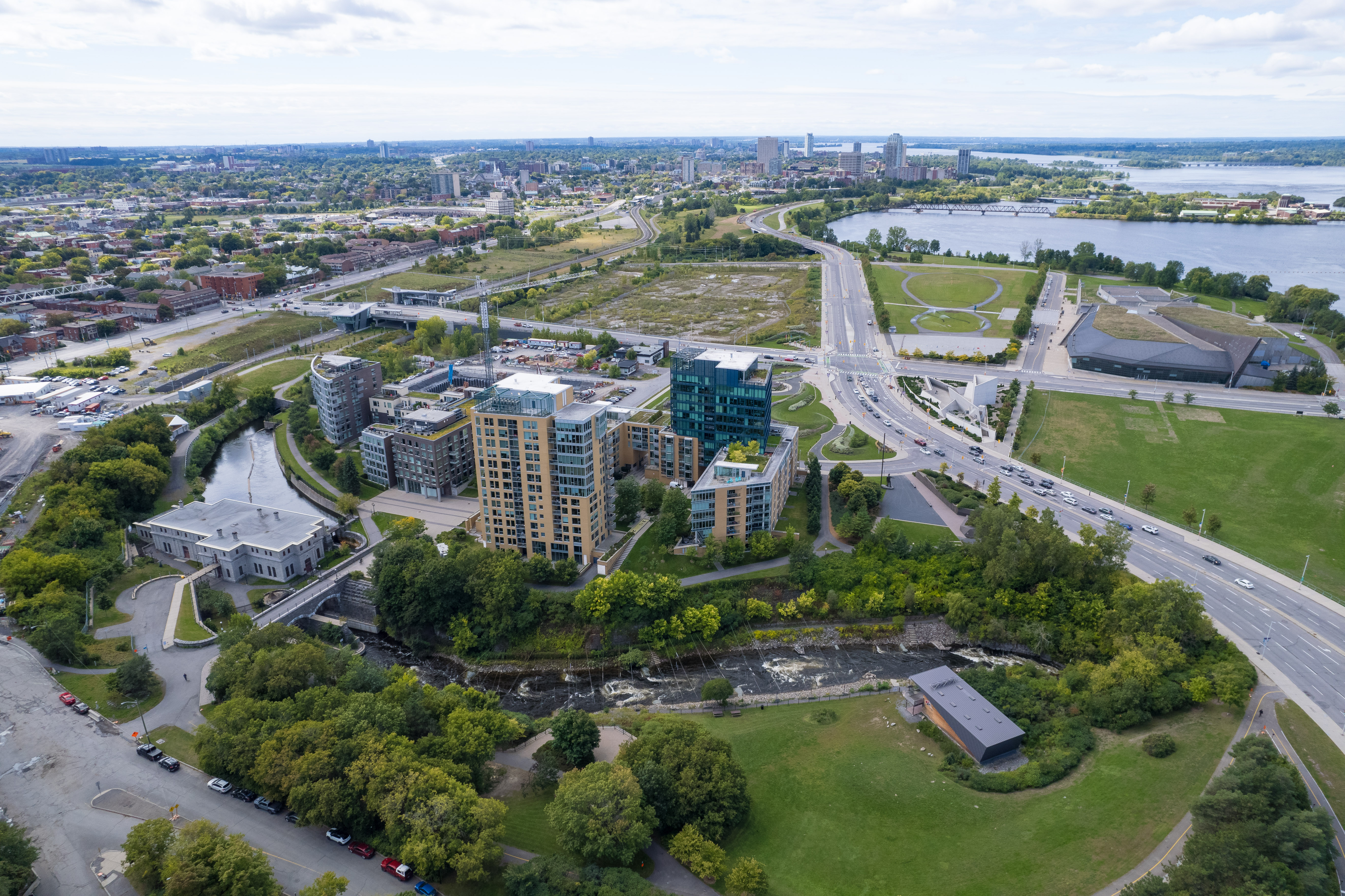
- Nicknames: The Flats, LeBreton
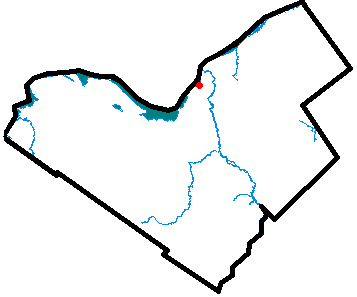
- Location of LeBreton Flats in Ottawa
- Coordinates: 45°24′56″N 75°43′04″W
- Country: Canada
- Province: Ontario
- City: Ottawa

Government
  - MPs: Yasir Naqvi
  - MPPs: Catherine McKenney
  - Councillors: Ariel Troster

Area
  - Total: 0.84 km^{2} (0.32 sq mi)
- Elevation: 60 m (200 ft)

Population (2016)
  - Total: 620
- Canada 2016 Census
- Time zone: UTC−5 (Eastern (EST))
  - Summer (DST): UTC−4 (EDT)

LeBreton Flats (also spelled Lebreton Flats) (French: Plaines Lebreton), known colloquially as The Flats or LeBreton, is a neighbourhood in Somerset Ward in central Ottawa, Ontario, Canada. It lies to the west of Centretown neighbourhood, and to the north of Centretown West and Chinatown. The Ottawa River forms the western and northern limit, with the western side being a wider area of the river known as Nepean Bay.

Originally a residential area, much of the northern portion of the Flats is now occupied by the Canadian War Museum and the National Holocaust Monument. Pimisi station, a station on Ottawa's LRT system, is also in LeBreton Flats. About half of the total area, on the south side of the Kichi Zibi Mikan, is undergoing redevelopment. The population was 620 (2016 Census), up from 373 (2011 Census), and 57 in 2006 and 50 in 2001.

== Early history ==
=== Founding ===
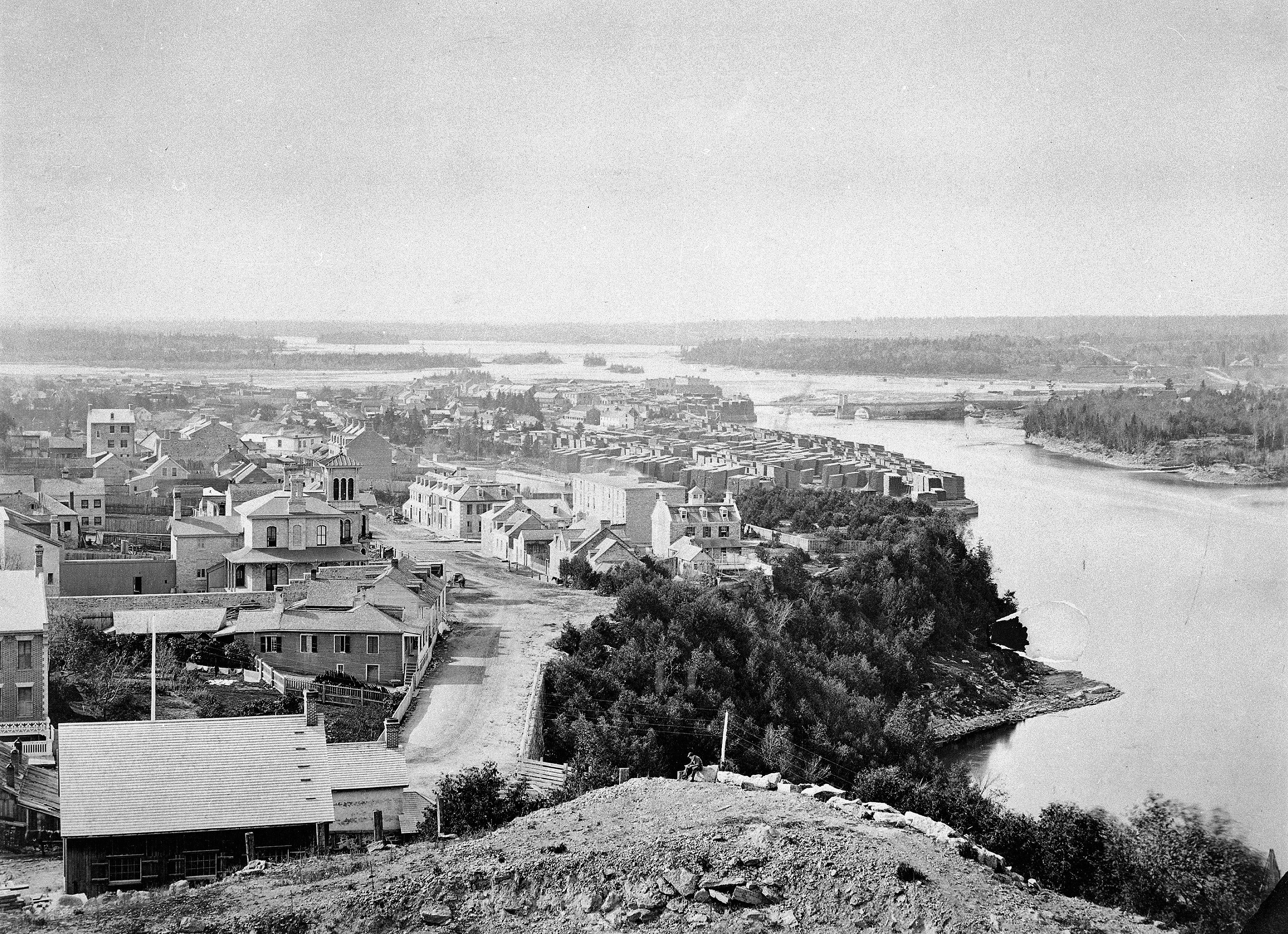
LeBreton Flats, c. 1865

LeBreton Flats was named after Lieutenant John LeBreton (1779–1848), one of Nepean Township's first settlers (c. 1819) and a hero of the War of 1812. As an officer in the Royal Newfoundland Regiment between April and October 1812, he acted as adjutant to the Voltigeurs Canadiens. LeBreton purchased the area in 1820, a purchase which has been described as solely for the purpose of capitalizing on the construction of the planned Rideau Canal.

The account, according to his detractors, goes as follows. In 1820, LeBreton lived at the community of Britannia, west of Ottawa and overheard Lord Dalhousie explain that the intended plan for the Rideau Canal was from Dow's Lake to the Chaudière Falls, directly crossing the flats. LeBreton bought the land for £499, before Lord Dalhousie had a chance to purchase the territory. LeBreton then offered to sell the land to Dalhousie for £3000. Dalhousie recognized LeBreton's land speculation and was so infuriated he decided to move the canal to Entrance Bay, the current location where the canal enters into the Ottawa River. This significantly raised the cost of the canal, as it was a longer route and additional locks were now required. At the same time, Dalhousie purchased neighbouring Barracks Hill as part of the agreement, which would become Parliament Hill.

For his part, LeBreton vigorously maintained that he had purchased the land fairly at a public auction and that he had been grievously wronged by Dalhousie and those in the community who took the Governor General's side. LeBreton claimed he was one of the few to grasp the commercial value of the flats and that he had begun to make offers to acquire land there as early as 1818, well before the canal was approved or any route revealed. LeBreton presented Dalhousie with a lengthy written defence against the allegations. These arguments Dalhousie somewhat peremptorily dismissed, entrenching the notion of LeBreton as a swindler in local legend.

=== 19th-century development ===
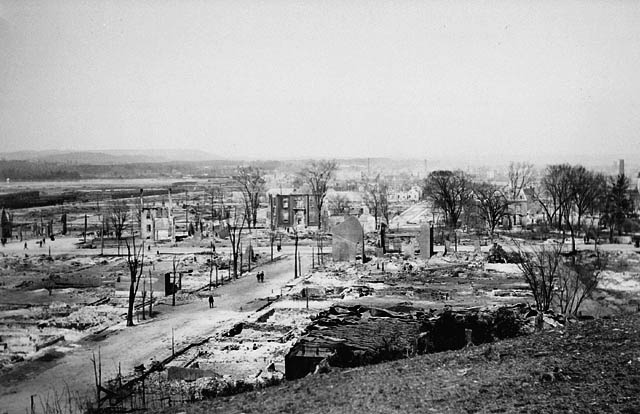
LeBreton Flats after the 1900 fire.

By the mid-19th century, LeBreton Flats developed into a mixed community to serve the lumber mills on the nearby Chaudière and Victoria islands. A rail line came in with a station and yards, and industries developed in turn. There was also housing for both the workers and owners, as well as hotels and taverns.

The area was ravaged by the Great Fire of 1900, which had started across the river in Hull (now Gatineau, Quebec), but crossed over by way of the great stacks of piled lumber on the islands. The fire destroyed the neighbourhood, leaving many homeless. The area was rebuilt, but the lumber barons relocated their dwellings up into the city proper above the escarpment, leaving the workers as the remaining Flats' residents.

== Urban renewal and redevelopment ==
Historical population
Year	Pop.	±%
1951	2,512	—
1956	1,947	−22.5%
1961	2,161	+11.0%
1966	95	−95.6%
1971	95	+0.0%
1976	70	−26.3%
1981	60	−14.3%
1986	45	−25.0%
1991	60	+33.3%
1996	45	−25.0%
2001	47	+4.4%
2006	57	+21.3%
2011	373	+554.4%
2016	620	+66.2%
2021	847	+36.6%

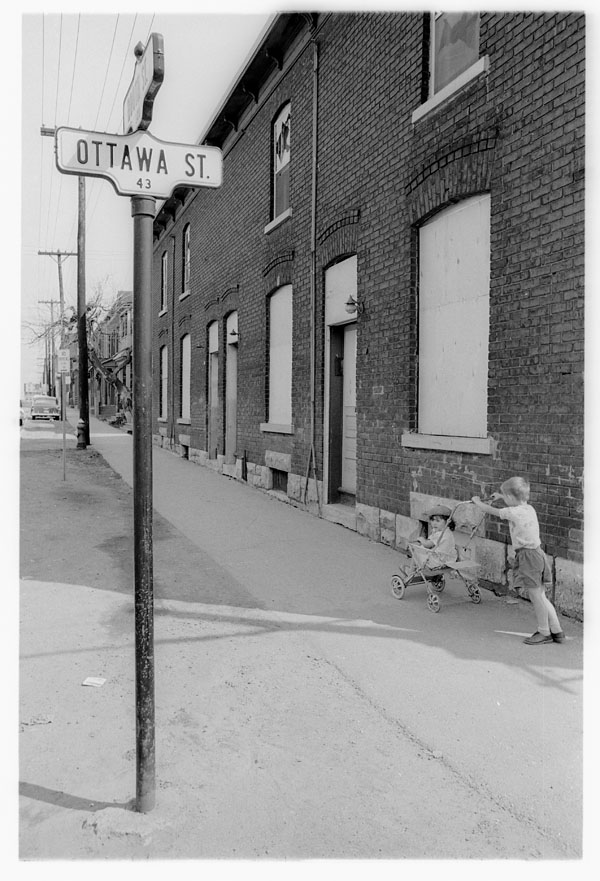
Two children in LeBreton Flats in 1963, as the lands were being expropriated and the residents forced to vacate the neighbourhood.

In the 1960s, expropriation occurred in order to make room for redevelopment, including offices for the Government of Canada. Ottawa Valley artist Ralph Wallace Burton documented the neighbourhood in his Lebreton Flats series of oil sketches (now on display in Ottawa City Hall), "working just ahead of the demolition crews".

As a result of disputes over the use of the land and soil contamination from the previous industrial uses, the land remained vacant for over forty years. It was used in the winter for piling snow that had been removed from Ottawa streets, with the pile often remaining well into the late spring. As a result of the runoff from this snowpile, the land became more contaminated.

Because of this, it was found that almost all of the area's topsoil would have to be removed in order for redevelopment to proceed, but the ownership had to be consolidated, since the Government of Canada, the former Regional Municipality of Ottawa-Carleton government, and the City of Ottawa were all landowners. This situation was remedied with a federal agency called the National Capital Commission (NCC) acquiring all title to the land.

In May 2005, the new home for the Canadian War Museum was opened on LeBreton Flats as the first component of redevelopment. There are plans to use the remainder of the site for housing, commercial space, offices and parkland.

The southern part of LeBreton Flats between Albert Street and Nanny Goat Hill escaped the expropriation of the 1960s. In this area, brick houses and townhouses built immediately following the 1900 fire still exist alongside row housing built in the 1970s. The portion of Lorne Avenue which lies below Nanny Goat Hill is an example of the housing which filled LeBreton prior to the 1960s and is a Heritage District designated by the City of Ottawa.

The western portion of the Transitway ran through LeBreton Flats, which served Lebreton station. The Transitway was replaced by the O-Train Line 1 light rail, which opened on September 14, 2019.

As of the Canada 2006 Census, 57 people were living in LeBreton Flats. The portion of LeBreton Flats that had been expropriated and left vacant in the 1960s welcomed its first residents in 2008, as the first condominium building constructed in the first phase of the redevelopment neared completion.

=== RendezVous LeBreton development ===
In 2015, the NCC put out a request for submissions to redevelop the south and south-western sections of LeBreton Flats, north of Albert Street, 21 hectares (52 acres) in size. Four groups submitted proposals:

- RendezVous LeBreton Group - a partnership of the Ottawa Senators and Trinity Developments
- Claridge Homes
- Devcore Group
- Focus Equities

In April 2016, the NCC selected the RendezVous Lebreton proposal, which included 4,000 housing units, park space, a recreation facility with services for the disabled, a library (just off the defined redevelopment lands) and a new arena for the Ottawa Senators team in the NHL. A completion date was not announced.

In January 2018, the NCC reached an agreement with RendezVous to redevelop LeBreton Flats in a two-phase operation. However, before construction could begin, a conflict between the development consortium parties led to that project being cancelled by the NCC. The NCC then conducted a new series of public consultations which resulted in a new Preliminary Master Concept Plan being approved in January 2020. The plan divided the undeveloped land into four sectors, with the intention of determining, in the first half of 2020, the order in which the various parcels of land will be developed, and parks and public spaces created.

On June 23, 2022, the Senators-led Capital Sports Development Inc came to agreement with the National Capital Commission on a new plan with new partners for the development of the New Ottawa Arena. On September 20, 2024, the NCC reached an agreement in principle with the Senators to sell a little over 10 acres (4.0 ha) of land in LeBreton Flats to Capital Sports Development Inc with the plan to develop the area including a new arena for the team. A land sale agreement, for LeBreton Flats, was signed in August 2025 with the National Capital Commission for CA$30 million (US$24 million).

== Pooley's Bridge ==
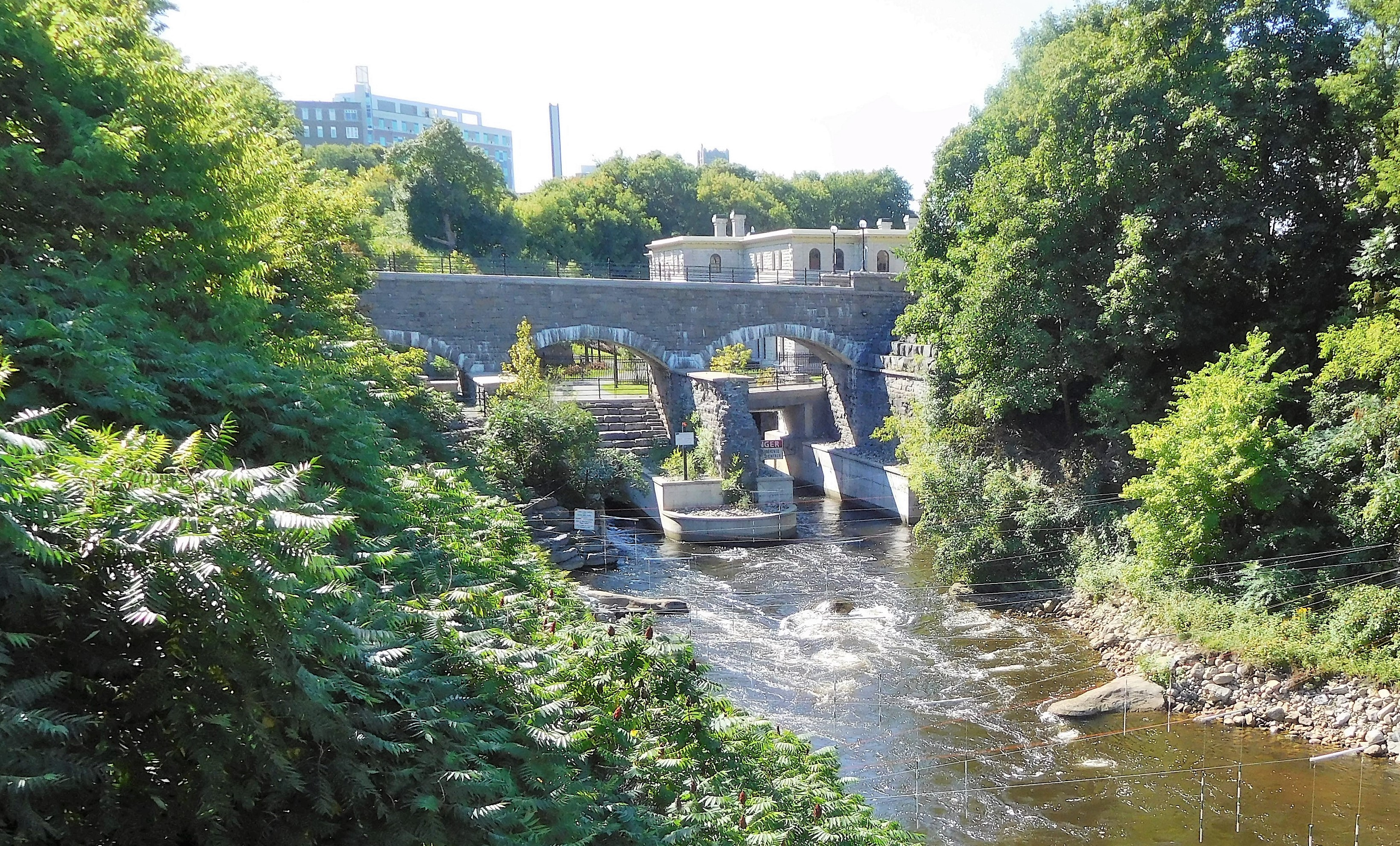
Pooley's Bridge

Pooley's Bridge (45.416594°N 75.7108°W), Ottawa's oldest bridge, is a stone arch bicycle/pedestrian bridge located in LeBreton Flats east of the Canadian War Museum and south of the Portage Bridge. The three-span closed spandrel stone arch structure, built in 1873, was designated as a heritage structure by the City of Ottawa in 1994. It is located beside the Fleet Street Pumping Station (Ottawa's original water works) at the end of Fleet Street.

The bridge is located at 9 Fleet Street, at the southwest edge of Bronson Park. It is very near and southeast of LeBreton Flats' first new condo unit. It is south (but beyond some grassy area) of where Wellington Street meets the Portage Bridge. The city describes it as "over the channel tailrace of the Fleet Street Pumping Station". The City waterworks building, including the pumping station and the aqueduct were designated as heritage in 1982 under the Part IV of the Ontario Heritage Act.

Pooley's Bridge is one of six stone arch bridges in the Lebreton Flats, all built c. 1873. All are Heritage Bridges and are designated to serve as pedestrian/bicycle facilities only. The five other bridges are all single-span stone arch bridges over the aqueduct, west of Pooley's Bridge. They are: Canada Central Railway Bridge, Broad Street Bridge, Lloyd Street Bridge, Grand Trunk Railway Bridge and Lett Street Bridge. The first bridge is owned by the National Capital Commission; the second, third and fifth by the City of Ottawa; and the fourth bridge is under the Region's ownership. The third, fourth and fifth bridges are connected.

The condition of Pooley's Bridge has been of concern for a number of years. It was necessary to undertake the controlled removal operations on the bridge in 1994 to ensure public safety. Due to anticipated failures, the City of Ottawa filed an Application to Alter and make repairs to five other stone arch bridges in the area in 1999. The repairs required at the five stone arch bridges were relatively minor, but expensive.

Pooley's Bridge in Bytown, an earlier bridge, was built in 1836 by Lieutenant Henry Pooley and assigned by Colonel John By who gave it the name after seeing the unpeeled log structure. The bridge was on the road from Wellington and Bank en route to the Union Bridge (see Chaudière Bridge). It was between Upper Town and LeBreton Flats, and appeared in a Chesterton painting.

== Tailrace whitewater course ==
Downstream of Pooley's Bridge and the Pumphouse lies the Tailrace. The Ottawa River Runners made the Tailrace into a Class 2 whitewater course with natural and artificial obstacles for competitions and practice.

== Events held at LeBreton Flats ==
The Ottawa Bluesfest music festival takes place at Lebreton Flats annually. Performances by many international and local musicians occur during this 10-day music festival in the month of July.

In 2022, the main Canada Day stage show, traditionally held on Parliament Hill, was moved to the park due to the ongoing renovation project at the Centre Block.

== Public art ==
When the Rubber Meets the Road

In 2023, a sculpture called When the Rubber Meets the Road by Gerald Beaulieu was installed by the National Capital Commission on a bike path in LeBreton, near Pimisi station. The sculpture, which depicts a run-over crow, is 5 metres long, weighs 360 kilograms and is made of 50–60 recycled tires. The NCC paid $14,022 for the work, which was set to be on display for one year, but this was later extended to two. Its installation was met with mixed reactions from the public, with some people praising it and some criticizing the expenditure.

== See also ==
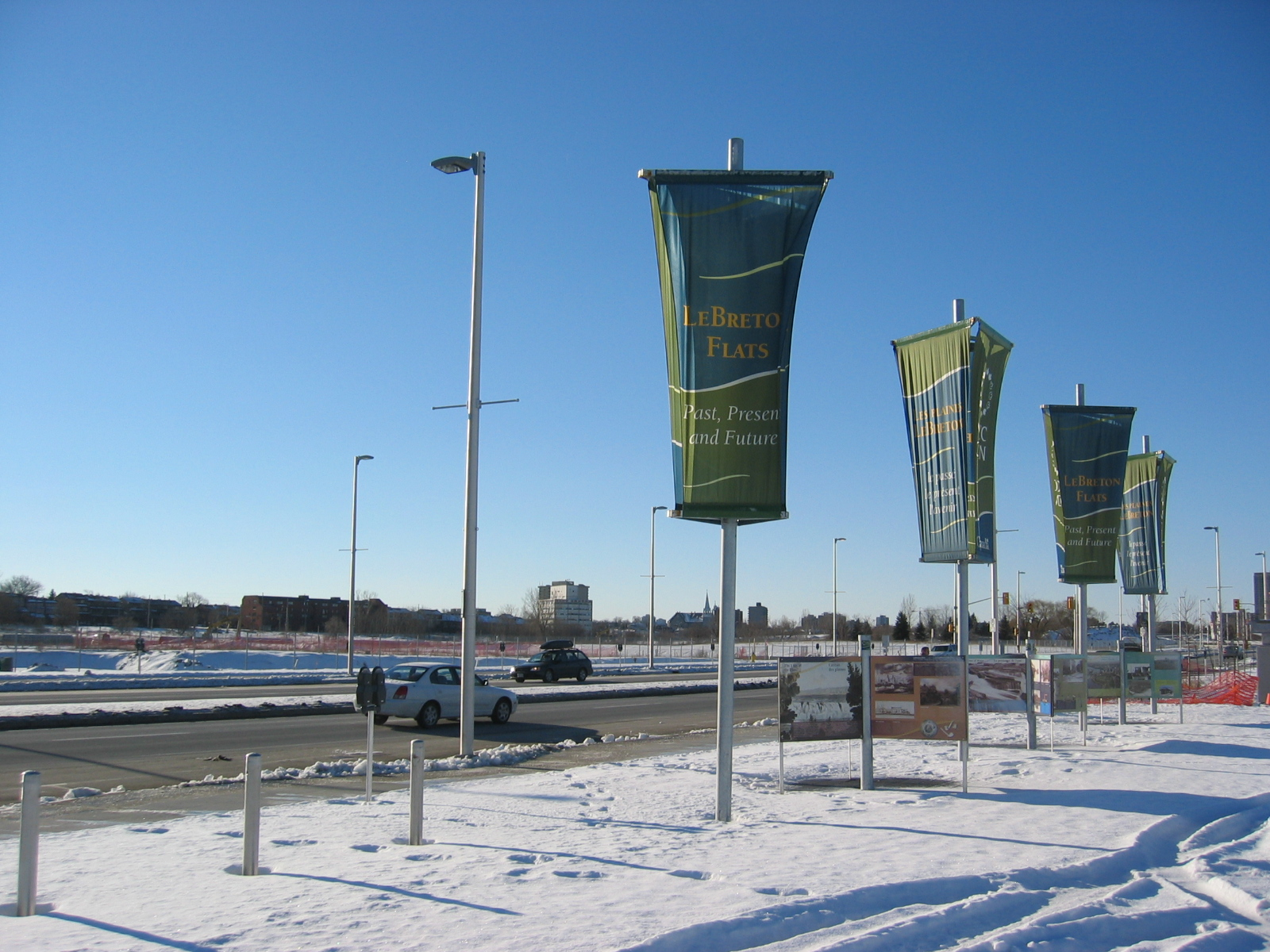
View of LeBreton Flats in December 2005, prior to redevelopment.

- List of Ottawa neighbourhoods
- Fleet Street Pumping Station
- Ralph Wallace Burton
