= Naomi Jackson Groves =

Canadian painter and art historian

Naomi Jackson Groves OC
- Born: Naomi Jackson; 1910; Montreal, Canada
- Died: December 25, 2001 (aged 90–91)
- Education: McGill University, BA and MA Harvard University, PhD
- Occupations: Writer, painter
- Spouse: James Walton Groves (1906–1970)
- Relatives: A. Y. Jackson (uncle)
- Writing career
- Notable awards: Order of Canada, 1993

Naomi Jackson Groves CM (1910 – December 25, 2001) was a Canadian painter, art historian and linguist. An expert on German expressionist artist Ernst Barlach, she translated a number of his works in addition to publishing a series of books about her uncle, painter A. Y. Jackson, and translations of artist Jens Rosing's writing.

== Biography ==
Groves was born in Montreal, Canada, in 1910. She was the daughter of artist H. A. C. Jackson and the niece of painter A. Y. Jackson. As a child she grew up speaking French and English, learning Danish from a family in the neighborhood. At the age of 18 she traveled to Copenhagen to spend a year with the family, becoming fluent in the language. Unable to continue studying Danish at McGill University, due to lack of course availability, she studied German and was awarded a Governor General's gold medal for modern languages and her academic achievements in 1933. She obtained a bachelor's degree the same year and completed master's degree in 1935.

Groves began studying art at the Art Association of Montreal (AAM) as a high-school student where she was taught by Harold Beament and Sarah Robertson, of the Beaver Hall Group. She studied art while in Denmark and returned to the AAM in 1936, receiving instruction from Lilias Torrance Newton. Groves, whose landscape oil paintings are held in collections at the National Gallery of Canada, the Robert McLaughlin Art Gallery and the McMaster Museum of Art, wished to paint full-time, but was encouraged by her parents to pursue work in academia due to the financial instability of an artistic career.

In 1936 Groves was awarded a travel scholarship by the Canadian Federation of University Women to Germany. Prior to beginning her studies, she traveled and painted in France and Germany with her uncle, A. Y. Jackson. The diaries the pair kept during the two-month trip were the basis for Groves' book Two Jacksons Abroad (2000), which includes correspondence and reproductions of their drawings and paintings from this period. It was during this trip that she discovered expressionist artist Ernst Barlach. Groves went on to become a leading expert of his work, translating several of his publications. Barlach was the focus of her doctoral dissertation, Ernst Barlach : the development of a versatile genius, which she started at Radcliffe College in 1937 and later completed at Harvard University in 1950 after her studies were put on hold during the war.

Between 1940 and 1942 Groves taught German at Wheaton College in Massachusetts, before moving to Ottawa where, until 1943, she worked as an assistant to the director of the National Gallery of Canada and taught German at Carleton University. As a member of the Quaker's Friends Service Committee, Groves traveled to Finnish-Lapland where from 1945 to 1947 she assisted with the post-war relief effort including food programs and the reintroduction of education programs. Excerpts from Groves diary, along with photographs and illustrations, were published in the 1989 book Winter Into Summer Lapland Diary, 1945–1946.

=== Later life ===
In 1951, after completing her PhD, Groves took a position at McMaster University where she reestablished and chaired the department of fine arts, following its closure during the war. She remained at the school until 1958, where her interest in Barlach influenced the acquisition of several German expressionist prints held by the school's McMaster Museum of Art. Groves relocated to Ottawa after marrying her husband, James Walton Groves (1906–1970), then Chief of the Mycology Section of Agriculture Canada's Botany Division, in 1957. The couple had met as family friends thanks to her father's interest in fungi.

In addition to her translations for Barlach's writing, Groves translated several works by Greenlandic artist and writer Jens Rosing and authored or edited several books about A.Y. Jackson. She received honorary doctorates in literature from McMaster in 1972 and Carleton in 1990, and was awarded the Order of Canada in 1993.

=== Death ===
Groves died in Ottawa on December 25, 2001. A funeral service was held in her honour at the Christ Church Cathedral on December 29.

== Publications ==
- A.Y.'s Canada. Toronto; Vancouver: Clarke, Irwin. 1968. OCLC 53344470.
- Ernst Barlach : life in work : sculpture, drawings and graphics, dramas, prose works and letters in translation. Königstein im Taunus: Langewiesche. 1972. ISBN 9783784541518. OCLC 13158818.
- One summer in Québec : A.Y. Jackson in 1925 : a family view. Kapuskasing, Ont., Canada: Penumbra Press. 1988. ISBN 9780921254027. OCLC 19836249.
- Winter into summer : Lapland diary, 1945–1946. Waterloo, Ont.: Penumbra Press. 1989. ISBN 9780920806937.
- Works by A.Y. Jackson from the 1930s. Ottawa: Carleton University Press. 1990. ISBN 9780886291358. OCLC 757037338.
- Two Jacksons abroad, 1936 (1st ed.). [Manotick, Ont.]: Penumbra Press. 2000. ISBN 9781894131049. OCLC 44446412.

=== Translations ===
- Barlach, Ernst (1990). A Selftold tale. Waterloo, Ont.: Penumbra Press. ISBN 9780921254072.
- Barlach, Ernst (1992). The dead day : drama in five acts. Waterloo, Ont., Canada: Penumbra Press. ISBN 9780921254362.
- Rosing, Jens (1998). The Unicorn of the Arctic Sea : the Narwhal and Its Habitat. Manotick, ON: Penumbra Press. ISBN 9780921254829. OCLC 40339968.
- Barlach, Ernst (2001). The poor relation : drama in twelve scenes (1st Canadian ed.). [Manotick, ON]: Penumbra Press. ISBN 9781894131261.
