= 1900 Hull–Ottawa fire =

Destructive Canadian urban fire

Coordinates: 45°25′18″N 75°42′57″W

The Hull-Ottawa fire of 1900 was a devastating fire in 1900 that destroyed much of Hull, Quebec, and large portions of Ottawa, Ontario.

== Incident ==
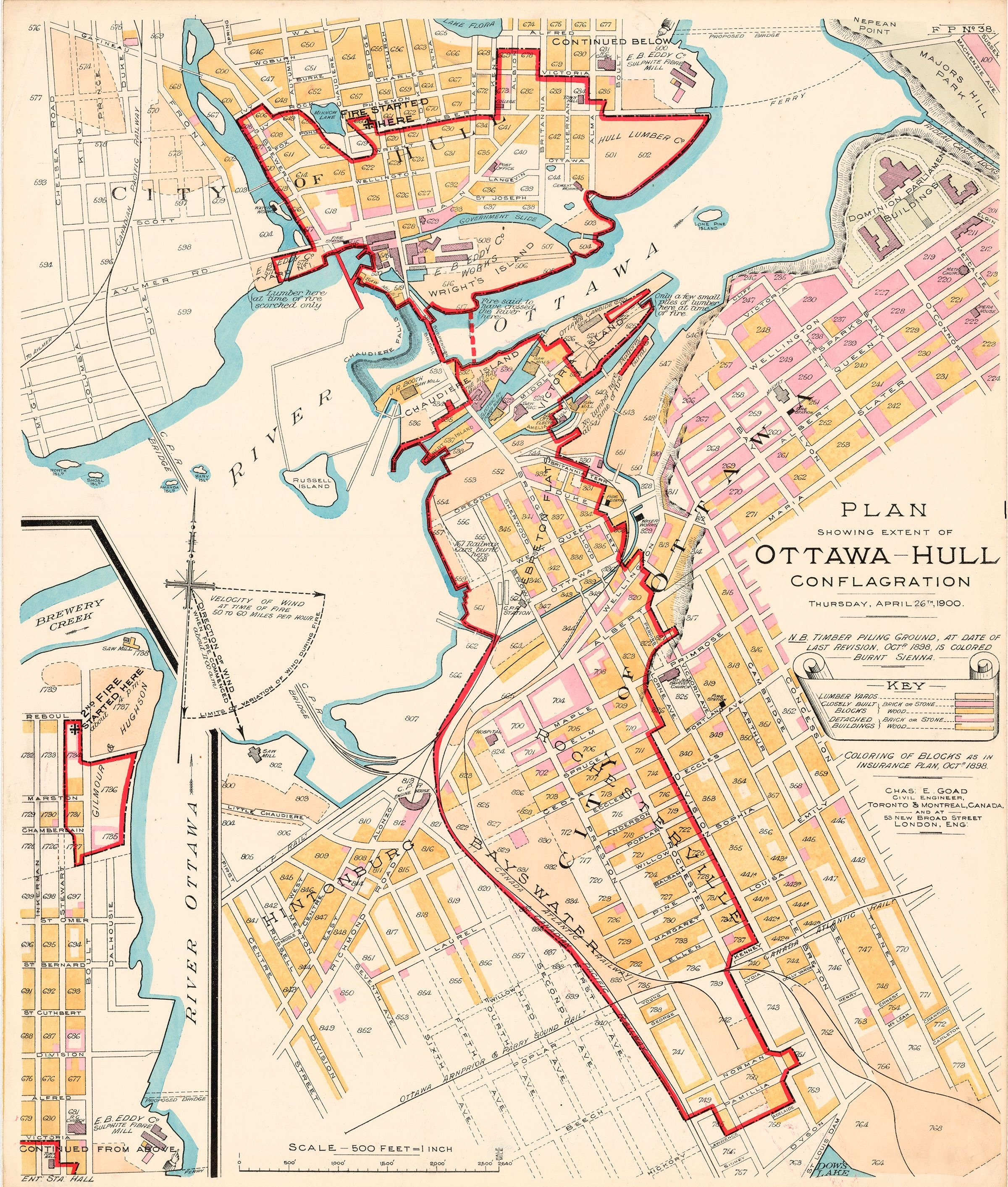
Extent of fire

Around 10 AM on April 26 a defective chimney on a house in Hull caught fire, which quickly spread between the wooden houses due to windy conditions. Within two hours the blaze had destroyed several surrounding blocks. At that point it began to spread along the river, where there were large lumber companies on the banks and islands, and huge amounts of stacked lumber that quickly ignited. By 1 PM the fire jumped the river on embers and set the Ottawa side ablaze.

Two thirds of Hull was destroyed, including 40 per cent of its residential buildings and most of its largest employers along the waterfront. The fire also spread across the Ottawa River, carried by wind borne embers and destroyed a large swath of western Ottawa from the Lebreton Flats south to Dow's Lake. About one fifth of Ottawa was destroyed with almost everything in the band between Booth Street and the rail line leveled. Much of the city's industry was destroyed, including two major ironworks, two flourmills, and both the Ottawa Electric Railway and Electric Lighting Company. Parliament was adjourned following the loss of power.

Prevailing wind patterns and the higher elevation of central Ottawa prevented the fire from spreading east. The fire break created by the rail line also preserved the Hintonburg area. The fire engines 'The Conqueror' and 'La France' had to be abandoned to the flames, and the call went out to five communities for assistance in fighting the blaze, including Montreal and Toronto. Montreal was able to send a fire engine by rail, which arrived in less than two hours. Dynamiting houses to block the fire's spread was considered, but this plan was rejected in view of the danger that falling debris from the blast would only spread the conflagration further. The fire was largely contained by midnight thanks to a shift in winds and the efforts of firefighters as well as the Ottawa Militia.

Seven people were killed in the blaze, and fifteen thousand were made homeless, including 14% of the population of Ottawa and 42% of Hull's population. Property losses amounted to $6,200,000 in Ottawa and $3,300,000 in Hull, with insurance covering 50% of the damage in Ottawa but only 23% of the damage in Hull. More were killed by disease in the densely packed tent cities where the people were forced to live afterwards. Worldwide response to the disaster generated $957,000 in aid.

== Legacy ==
A Souvenir photo views of the big fire, Ottawa & Hull, April 26, 1900, was produced. A postcard was produced showing the aftereffects of the Ottawa Hull Fire of April 26, 1900, with a view of The Hotel Cecil on the south side of Wellington Street in Ottawa.

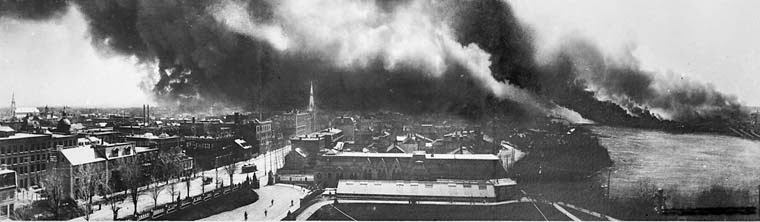
The Hull-Ottawa fire

== See also ==
- Parliament building fire 1916
- List of fires in Canada
- List of disasters in Canada
