= Ingo Hessel =

Canadian art historian, artist (born 1955)

- Born: Ingo D. W. Hessel; 1955; Ottawa, Ontario
- Education: BA in Art History from Carleton University (1977)
- Known for: art historian, artist

Ingo D. W. Hessel (born 1955) is a Canadian art historian and curator specializing in Inuit Art. The author of Inuit Art: An Introduction, Hessel has curated exhibitions for the Heard Museum in Phoenix, Arizona, the Museum of Inuit Art in Toronto, and the Art Gallery of Ontario in Toronto.

== Life and career ==
Hessel was born in Ottawa, Ontario. He received a BA in Art History from Carleton University in 1977.

In 1983 Hessel began working in the field of Inuit art at the Department of Indian and Northern Affairs, Ottawa. As Special Projects Officer and Coordinator at the Canadian Inuit Art Information Centre from 1984 until 1998, he travelled throughout the north to work with Inuit artists and artist cooperatives. In late 1980s, he travelled to Labrador and surveyed Labrador Inuit artist. Between 1984 and 1998, he wrote Canadian Inuit Sculpture (1988) and curated Arviat Stone Sculpture (1990–91) for the McMichael Canadian Art Collection and Stories in Stone (1997) in Seoul, South Korea. In 1998 his book, Inuit Art: An Introduction was published by Douglas & McIntyre (Vancouver), Harry N. Abrams (New York), and the British Museum, London.

In 2006, Hessel was appointed the Albrecht Adjunct Curator of Inuit Art at the Heard Museum in Phoenix, Arizona. There he curated the exhibition Arctic Spirit: Inuit Art from the Albrecht Collection at the Heard Museum which travelled to the Anchorage Museum, the Lowe Art Museum, University of Miami, the J. Wayne Stark Galleries, Texas A&M University, the Mashantucket Pequot Museum, the Louisiana Art and Science Museum and other venues; the catalogue of the same name was co-published by the Heard Museum and Douglas & McIntyre (Vancouver). From 2008 to 2010 Hessel was Curator of the Museum of Inuit Art in Toronto, where he organized ten exhibitions including New Directions in Cape Dorset Drawing as well as a major retrospective exhibition on the artist Kananginak Pootoogook.

During the same period, he was guest curator for the exhibition Sanattiaqsimajut: Inuit Art from the Carleton University Art Gallery Collection (2009) and co-author with Sandra Dyck of the exhibition catalogue. At the Art Gallery of Ontario he co-curated Inuit Modern: Inuit Art from the Samuel and Esther Sarick Collection (2011) with Gerald McMaster and was principal author of the exhibition catalogue published in 2010. In 2013 he was a contributor to the exhibition catalogue Creation and Transformation: Defining Moments in Inuit Art at the Winnipeg Art Gallery. Cited as an authority in his field, Hessel authored the chapter on Inuit Art in The Visual Arts in Canada: The Twentieth Century in 2010. He has also been an Art History lecturer at the University of Ottawa (1992, 1994) and at Carleton University in Ottawa (2008, 2009). In 2011 he was appointed Head, Inuit Art Department, at Walker's Auctions in Ottawa, a position he held until 2018.

Hessel is President and a founding partner of the auction-retail company First Arts Premiers Inc. based in Toronto (founded 2018); other company partners are Patricia Feheley, Mark London, and Nadine Di Monte. First Arts is one of the leading auction houses for Inuit and First Nations art in Canada, holding twice-yearly live auctions, as well as periodic online auctions and retail exhibitions.

Hessel is also known as a sculptor and painter, and has exhibited in Canada in Toronto and Ottawa, and in Japan in Kyoto and Nagoya. Frequently visiting the Arctic during his career, his role in introducing new media to northern communities was acknowledged at The Festive North (2005) exhibition at the McMichael Canadian Art Collection. He was a member of the Board of Directors of the Inuit Art Foundation from 2012-2014.

== Select publications ==
- Contributor Creation and Transformation: Defining Moments in Inuit Art. Ed. Darlene Coward Wight. Winnipeg Art Gallery: 2012. Print. ISBN 9781926812892
- Author "A Culture in Transition: Inuit Art in the Twentieth Century" in The Visual Arts in Canada: The Twentieth Century. Ed. Anne Whitelaw, Brian Foss and Sandra Paikowsky. Oxford University Press (Canada), 2010. Print. ISBN 9780195421255
- Contributor/curator Sanattiaqsimajut: Inuit Art from the Carleton University Art Gallery Collection Ottawa: Carleton University Art Gallery, 2009. Print. ISBN 9780770905330 2010 Ontario Association of Art Galleries: Special recognition art publication of the year, and 2009 American Association of Museum Publications Design Competition: First place exhibition catalogue design.
- Contributor/co-curator Inuit Modern: Art from the Samuel and Esther Sarick Collection. Ed. Gerald McMaster. Vancouver: Douglas & McIntyre / Art Gallery of Ontario, 2009. Print. ISBN 0770905331. 2011 Melva J. Dwyer Award.
- Author/curator Arctic Spirit, Creation and Transformation. Vancouver: Douglas & McIntyre, 2006. Print. ISBN 1553651898
- Author Inuit Art: In Introduction. London: British Museum Press, 1998. Print. ISBN 9780714125459 (Canadian edition ISBN 1550548298 and US edition ISBN 0810934760)
- Co-author Visions of Power: Contemporary Art by First Nations, Inuit and Japanese Canadians. Toronto: Earth Spirit Festival, 1991. Print. ISBN 0969526806
