= Leo Ayotte =

Canadian painter (1909–1976)

- Born: October 10, 1909; Sainte-Flore, Quebec, Canada
- Died: December 21, 1976 (aged 67)
- Occupation: Artist
- Known for: Painter

Leo Ayotte (October 10, 1909 – December 21, 1976), was a Canadian oil painter and artist.

== Early life ==
Born in Sainte-Flore, Mauricie, Quebec to a family of modest means, he began his studies at the College Séraphique and at Trois-Rivières Seminary, and finally, in Nicolet. He abandoned his studies at the end of his rhetoric and began to compose poems and paint.

In 1938, Ayotte moved to Montreal and worked as a model at the École des beaux-arts de Montréal and the Montreal Museum of Fine Arts. Not being registered, Ayotte could not follow the lessons, but his work there as a model and as a janitor allowed him to listen in on classes. Without money, he also picked up the half-empty tubes left by careless students and used them to paint. The director Maillard told him later after he saw one of his paintings: "You are my best student."

== Visit to Paris ==
Through his art career and lectures, Ayott was able to save enough money to fulfil his dream of visiting France. In July 1962, he went to visit the Louvre Museum, which moved him to tears. He visited his friend François Hertel and Robert Roussil, a sculptor, and the painter Jean Dallaire. He ended his trip on the French Riviera where he spent a lot of time painting with his niece, Louise-Helene Ayotte, who had just been awarded the Consul of France at the Ecole des Beaux-Arts.

After a year in France, he returned to Canada, where he participated in numerous exhibitions throughout Quebec until 1975. Suffering from cancer, he was transported on December 18, 1976, to the Hospital of Saint-Hyacinthe, where he died three days later on December 21, 1976.

== Artistic style ==
Ayotte began writing and doing landscape sketches at an early age. His love of nature brought him to painting. Mostly self-taught, he had a unique style. Ayotte often used a single brush to achieve a work. From a single stroke and with spontaneity Ayotte always achieved a successful painting with his first attempt, never having to make corrections or touch-ups. Except for his portraits, he painted without preliminary drawings, taking the time to make observations before starting to paint. The bold and lively colors that emerged from his brush captured the essence of his subjects. His colorful landscapes are real hymns to nature. His still lifes and portraits, charged with emotion, led him to be considered a major artist in Quebec.

== Galleries ==
The works of Ayotte are displayed at the Galerie Michel-Ange de Montreal and at the Galerie Le Balcon d'Art de Saint-Lambert as well as periodically in other galleries in Quebec and throughout Canada.

== Bibliography ==
- Ayotte, Léo; Hamel-Gingras, Lucie (1975). Mon Québec (in French). Promotion Mon Québec.
- Fortier, André; Ayotte, Léo (1980). Ayotte (in French). M. Broquet. ISBN 978-2-89000-023-0.
- Signatures
- Le Guide Vallée
