= History of Ottawa =

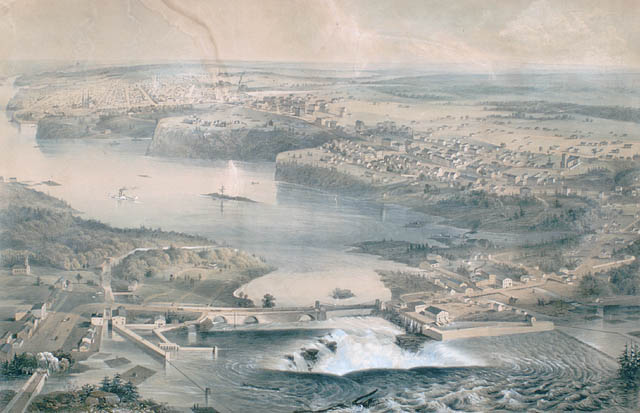
View of Parliament Hill and Chaudière Falls, Ottawa c. 1859.

The history of Ottawa begins with the retreat of the Laurentide ice sheet from c. 10,000 BCE to c. 6,000 BCE, which allowed human settlement. Since at least 500 CE, Algonquin people have lived along the Ottawa River, frequently meeting at Chaudière Falls (known to them as Akikodjiwan) to socialize and trade. Europeans first explored the river in 1610, but Algonquins maintained a de facto monopoly on trade until the Beaver Wars, when Haudenosaunee (known exonymically as Iroquois) (Note: Iroquois was historically used as a derogatory term for the Haudenosaunee peoples by members of the Wendat Nation. The preferred autonym is Haudenosaunee. Because Wikipedia policy is to favour autonyms and avoid terms that are considered derogatory, this article uses the term Haudenosaunee.) attacks drove many from the Ottawa Valley.

The subsequent Seven Years' War saw the conquest of New France, with the British claiming the Ottawa Valley via the Province of Quebec. However, the Algonquins continued to exercise de facto land rights for some time. The European population did not begin to grow substantially until after the American Revolutionary War, when British loyalists fled to the province and a major timber trade developed. Concerns about conflict with the newly independent United States prompted the construction of the Rideau Canal and the establishment of the adjacent settlement of Bytown—predecessor to present-day Ottawa, which received its current name in 1855.

Throughout the mid-19th century, the capital of Canada changed regularly before settling on Ottawa. Parliament Hill was constructed during the 1860s and 70s, leading to a major increase in the population. Processed lumber was central to the city's economy, though production began to decline beginning in the 1880s. Major disasters, including a fire in 1900 and typhoid epidemics in 1911 and 1912, caused many to argue that the city should be modernized. After the upheavals of World War I, the Great Depression, and World War II, the city underwent considerable changes under the Gréber Plan, becoming more decentralized. As the capital of Canada, it also saw many protests and social movements during the mid-twentieth century. In 1969, it became part of the Regional Municipality of Ottawa–Carleton (RMOC).

Over the next few decades, Ottawa's private sector grew substantially—particularly the technology sector. Various cultural institutions were established, including the present-day Ottawa Senators, Ottawa Bluesfest, CityFolk Festival, and Ottawa Fringe Festival. In 2001, under the direction of the Ontario provincial government, Ottawa annexed many of its neighbours in the RMOC, growing substantially in land area. Lines 1 and 2 were constructed—the latter attracting considerable controversy due to the Rideau Transit Group consortium's alleged mismanagement. In 2022, a large protest against federal vaccination requirements during the COVID-19 pandemic led to an occupation of the city that lasted several weeks, culminating in the invocation of the Emergencies Act.

== Pre-contact ==
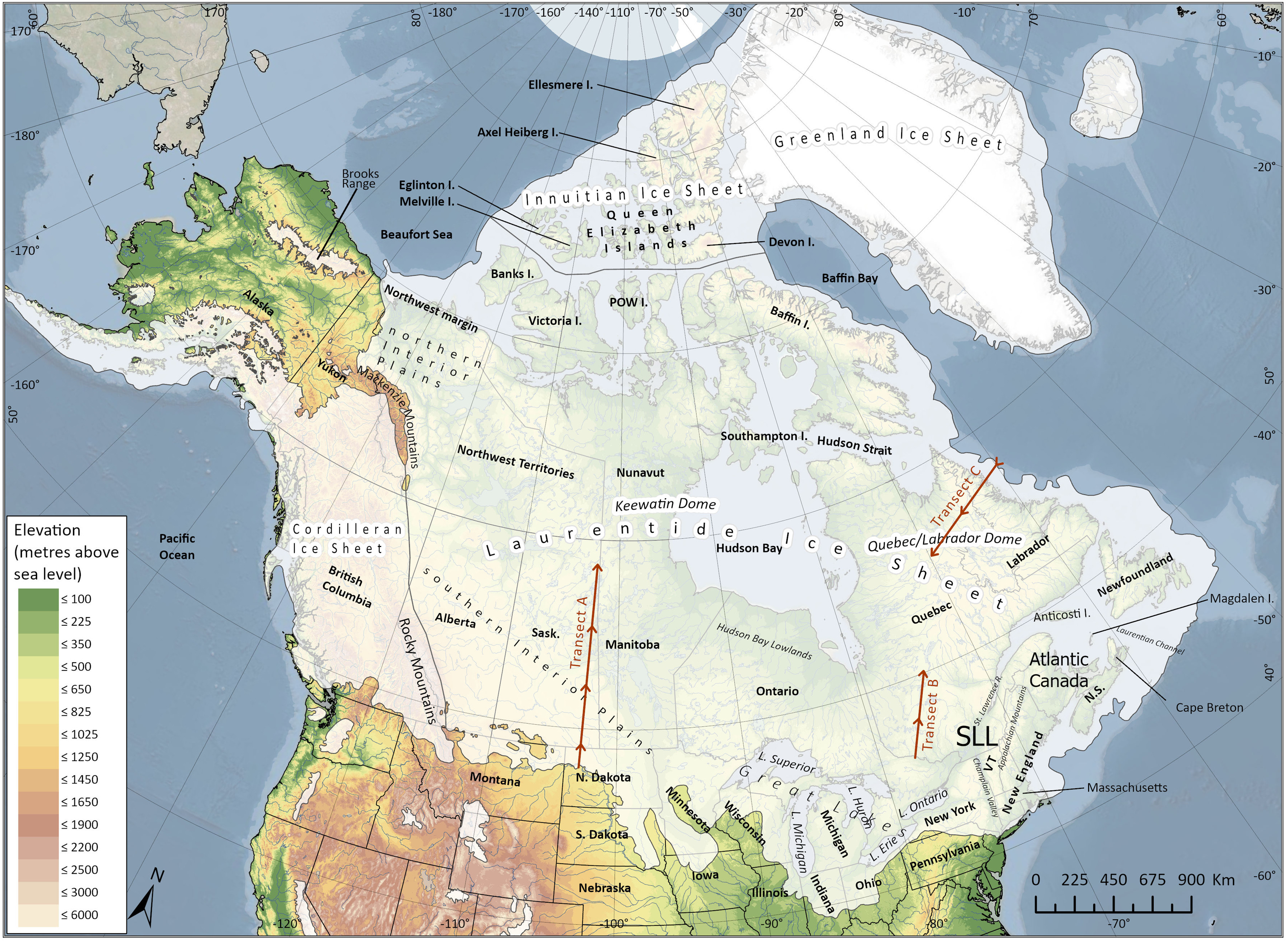
Maximum extent of the Laurentide ice sheet

From c. 10,000 BCE to c. 6,000 BCE, the Laurentide ice sheet retreated from the Ottawa Valley, rendering it habitable. Archaeologists Ken Swayze and Robert McGhee theorize based on stone artifacts found at the Heritage Hills site near present-day Ottawa that the area may have been used as a hunting ground for seals and other marine mammals as the ice sheet receded.

Other significant Archaic sites in the area include those at Allumette and Morrison Islands (near present-day Pembroke). Occupied between c. 3500 BCE and c. 2500 BCE, these sites were nodes in a major copper trading network stretching across North America. The copper industries at these sites were among the earliest examples of metal tool use in the world. The Woodland period saw the development of stone tools fashioned from local chert deposits and of ceramic containers, which first appear in the region's archaeological record at Pointe à l'Indien (located at the confluence of the Ottawa and Chalk Rivers).

=== Algonquian peoples ===
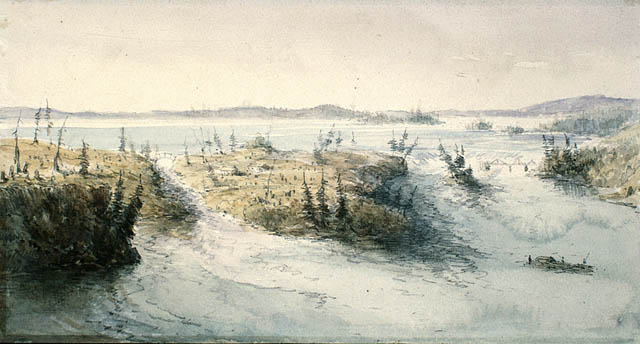
Chaudière Falls (known to the Algonquin as Akikodjiwan) was a central Algonquin site for socialization and trade.

Algonquian peoples have lived in the Ottawa Valley since at least 500 CE. Because the region was not suited to agriculture, many Algonquian groups practised fishing, hunting, and gathering. Most migrated seasonally throughout the region, congregating annually in the summer for economic, political, religious, and social activities. One congregation site for the Algonquin people (Note: The term Algonquin, referring to a specific group, is distinct from the term Algonquian, which refers to a broader group of people who speak Algonquian languages. For clarity when discussing the Algonquins' relationships with Europeans, this article also distinguishes them from the broader Anishinaabe culture, which includes the Algonquins as well as the Odawa, Ojibwe, Mississauga, Nipissing, Potawatomi, and Saulteaux, among others. However, these separate designations are contested by Indigenous historian Michael John Witgen, who argues that despite European attempts to map the interior by recognizing distinct "national" subgroups like these—in practice, Anishinaabe subgroups were often fluid and interconnected.) was located at Chaudière Falls (known to them as Akikodjiwan), where people commonly met to socialize and trade.

The Ottawa River (known to the Algonquin as Kitchisibi) was of central importance to the Algonquin people, serving as a site of community and religious ritual. According to Algonquin oral histories, families left mìgwechiwìhiwe (transl. 'tokens of gratitude') around rock carvings scattered along the riverbank to honour their ancestors and the river itself. These oral histories also say that the carvings were sites where manitou could move between worlds, with some helping to guide travellers along the river, among other things.

== European exploration and contact ==
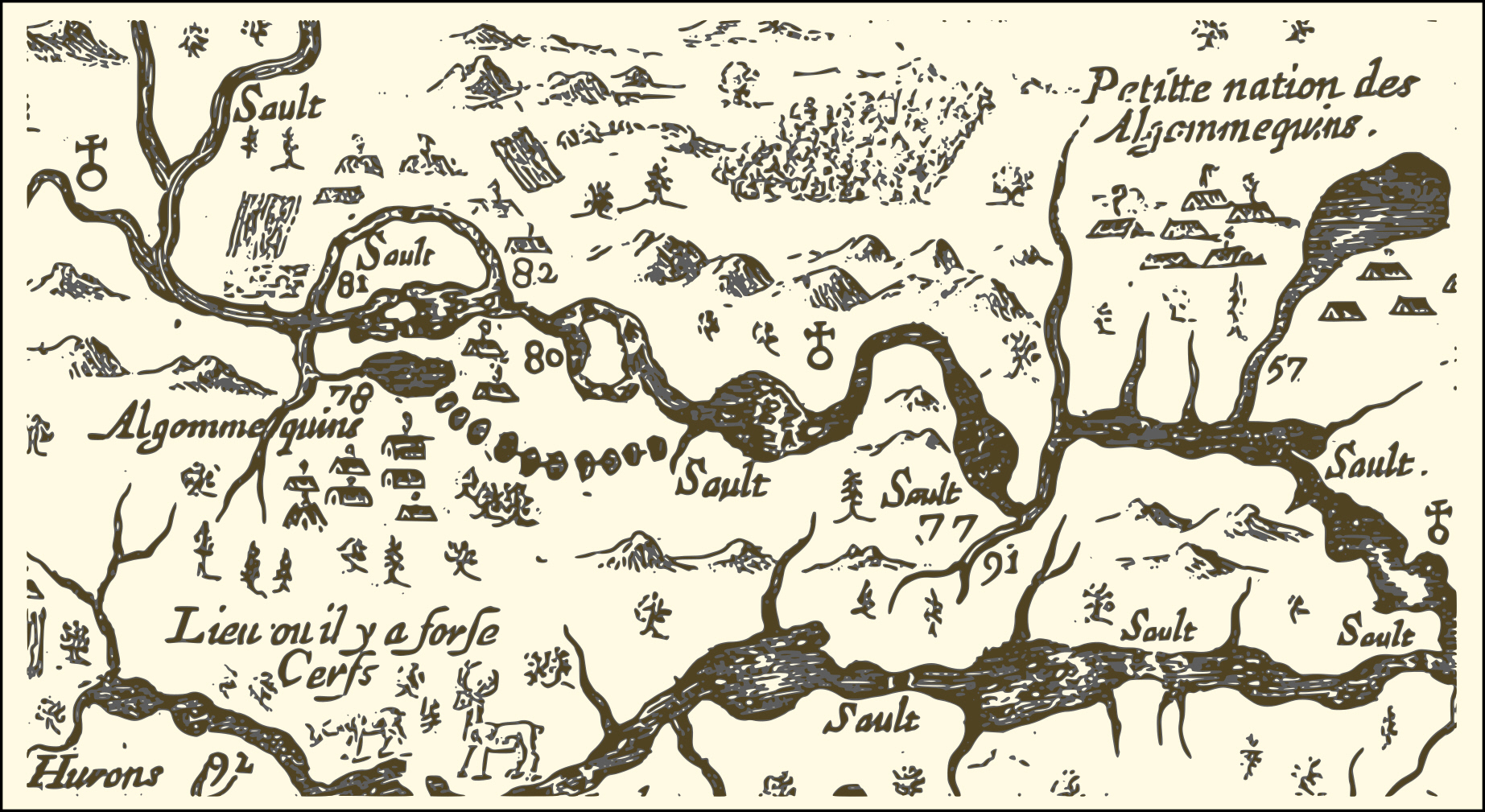
Samuel de Champlain's depiction of settlements near the Ottawa River in 1632. The present location of the city of Ottawa is number 77 on the map.

In 1610, French missionaries Étienne Brûlé and Nicolas de Vignau, who were sent by Samuel de Champlain to live among the Wendat people in Georgian Bay, were the first Europeans to explore the Ottawa River. After what he claimed was a later exepdition up the Ottawa, Vignau reported discovering the remains of an English ship. (Note: Vignau eventually revealled that he had lied about the extent of his expedition.) Intrigued by this rumour, Champlain himself travelled up the river in 1613 with Vignau.

At the time, the French identified six Algonquin groups living in the region: the Keinouche near present-day Pontiac, Quebec; the Matouweskarini near the Madawaska River; the Weskarini near the Lièvre River; the Onontchataronon directly along the Ottawa River; and the Otaguottouemin and Kichesipirini, both near Allumette Island—also directly along the Ottawa River. Champlain received help from the Kichesipirini, visiting Chaudière Falls, Rideau Falls, and Morrison Island (among other places). It was during this expedition that Champlain gave the Rideau River its French name, meaning "curtain".

=== Beaver wars ===
The Algonquin peoples were influential traders—and the Ottawa River an influential trade route. Under their leader, Tessouat, the Kichesipirini exercised a monopoly on trade along the river, preventing French traders from establishing forts along it. After Tessouat's death, however, Haudenosaunee (known exonymically as Iroquois) attacks disrupted this monopoly. This led to the Beaver Wars, which pitted the Algonquins and Wendat (nominally allied with the French) against the Haudenosaunee (nominally allied with the British). Haudenosaunee raids during this period, along with a number of epidemics, caused many Algonquin and Wendat peoples to flee the valley, seeking refuge in French settlements and in the area around Lac-Saint-Jean. Several Jesuit missionaries, including Jean de Brébeuf and Charles Lallemant, were also martyred during the conflict. However, by 1700, the Haudenosaunee had been completely driven from the valley, and the wars ended in 1701 with the Great Peace of Montreal.

=== British conquest and American Revolutionary War ===
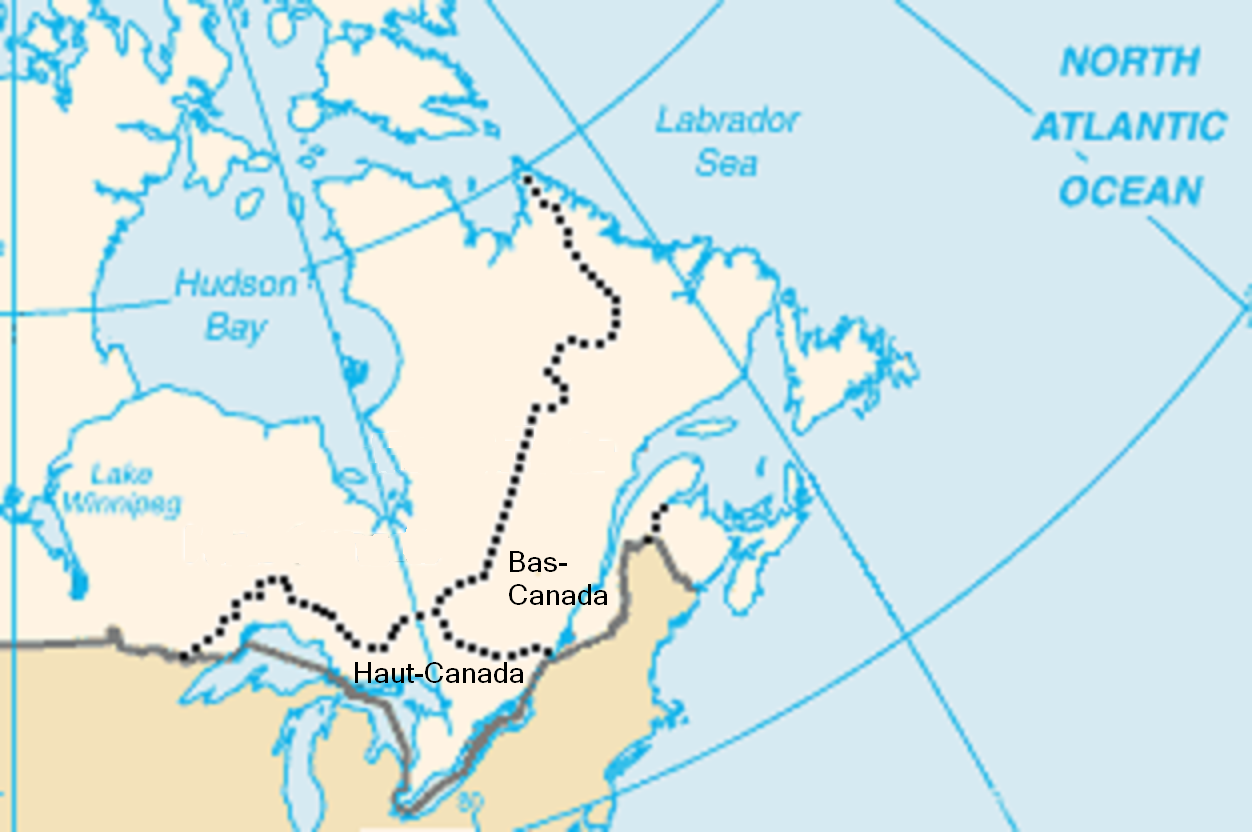
The Canadas as claimed by Britain after the passage of the Constitutional Act 1791

In 1756, the Seven Years' War erupted between the rival imperial powers of France and the United Kingdom, as well as their respective allies. The war spilled over into North America, with British troops conquering Quebec City and Montreal between 1759 and 1760. New France was placed under military rule. The primarily Scottish-controlled North West Company quickly took control of the European fur trade in the region and began surveying the Ottawa River. Meanwhile, the British officially claimed New France (including the area around present-day Ottawa) with the Treaty of Paris in 1763. Former French territory was consolidated into the Province of Quebec after the Royal Proclamation of 1763.

The province's European population remained very low until the American Revolutionary War, when displaced British loyalists fled to the province in great numbers. Between 1780 and 1784, the European population expanded from about 2,000 to about 25,000, with most settling in the southwest area of the province. After the war, many loyalists were granted free land in the Ottawa Valley. As tensions between these newly arrived loyalists and established Francophones rose, the Constitutional Act 1791 split the province into primarily Angolphone Upper Canada and primarily Francophone Lower Canada, with part of the boundary between the two defined by the Ottawa River.

Lower Canada refused to recognize the territorial rights of the First Nations people living along the Ottawa River. They argued that the land north of the river was French territory and had officially become British under the terms of the Treaty of Paris. Meanwhile, during councils in 1783 and 1784 in what would become Upper Canada, the British allegedly purchased large sections of the Ottawa Valley (including the territory of the present-day city of Ottawa) from the Algonquins and Haudenosaunee for property along the St. Lawrence River and clothing for one local chief. However, in practice, Algonquins from around the Lake of Two Mountains still exercised de facto land rights in the area around the eastern Ottawa River. They and their Nipissing allies used the region for hunting and trapping.

=== Birth of the timber industry ===
The Ottawa Valley's rich forests and waterways (which were used to power sawmills) made the region ideal for harvesting timber. The valley's first sawmill was installed by William Merrick, who founded Merrickville. Later, in 1800, Philemon Wright founded the first major European settlement in the valley near Chaudière Falls: Hull. Wright had hoped to use the land for farming, but timber proved more profitable. By 1806, Wright was selling timber to Quebec City. Other timber merchants—including Joseph Papineau, David Pattee, and Thomas Mears—soon followed. They found receptive markets as the British sought sources of timber for naval shipbuilding amidst the Napoleonic Wars and War of 1812.

=== Rideau Purchase ===
At the same time, Algonquin and Nipissing groups consolidated their control over the islands in the Ottawa River, issuing leases and collecting rents in 1802. In May 1819, the British negotiated with 257 Mississauga people in Kingston to purchase 2.7 million acres of Algonquin-controlled land in the Ottawa Valley—including significant parts of the modern-day National Capital Region. The British negotiators agreed to pay these 257 Mississaugas GBP £642 10s—50s per person—for the land. They also sent the Mississauga negotiators blankets, hats, jewellery, and telescopes. This came to be known as the Rideau Purchase. The Algonquin peoples who used the land were not consulted about the purchase and never officially ceded their rights to it. During the 1820s, conflicts over hunting rights along the river arose between these Algonquins and their Nipissing allies and encroaching Haudenosaunee and Abenaki groups. Many of these conflicts were the subject of petitions to the British government, which refused to grant any group hunting rights in the region.

== Construction of the Rideau Canal ==
=== Background to construction ===
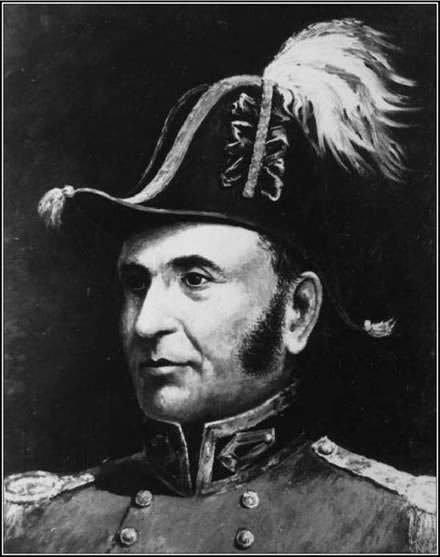
Lieutenant Colonel John By of the Royal Engineers was assigned to oversee construction of the Rideau Canal in 1826.

The War of 1812 caused a naval arms race between Britain and the United States. Most of the war's naval activity took place in the Great Lakes, and an American attempt to seize control of the St. Lawrence River via Montreal failed. However, after the fighting ended, it was reported to Major General Frederick Philipse Robinson that the Americans had developed a more detailed plan to seize control of the St. Lawrence via Kingston or Montreal if the war continued.

To protect against such an attack in the future, the British made plans to revive an abandoned French project to build a canal around the Lachine Rapids, as well as to construct a new canal connecting Kingston and Montreal. Arthur Wellesley, 1st Duke of Wellington, supported the construction of a canal, and after several initial surveys, George Ramsay, 9th Earl of Dalhousie, bought the headland for the planned Kingston-Montreal canal in 1823. However, funding for the project was not forthcoming from Upper Canada or Lower Canada. As a result, Wellington authorized the canal's construction as a military project in 1826.

=== Founding of Bytown ===
Lieutenant Colonel John By of the Royal Engineers was assigned to construct the canal. Bytown, the predecessor to the modern city of Ottawa, was founded to support the British Board of Ordnance in 1826. The Board of Ordnance was tasked with maintaining the "lands, depots and forts required for the defence of the realm and its overseas possessions" and supplying munitions to the British Army and Royal Navy. The military engineers building the canal were stationed in Bytown, where they drew up plans and coordinated with private contractors, with each contractor assigned a section of the canal. Many of these contractors were paid in Mexican silver obtained by the Royal Navy as part of a deal to transport funds to the King of Spain during the Napoleonic Wars. Bytown's land was parcelled off in 1827, with By giving Bank, Rideau, Sparks, Sussex, and York Streets their names.

=== Canal construction ===
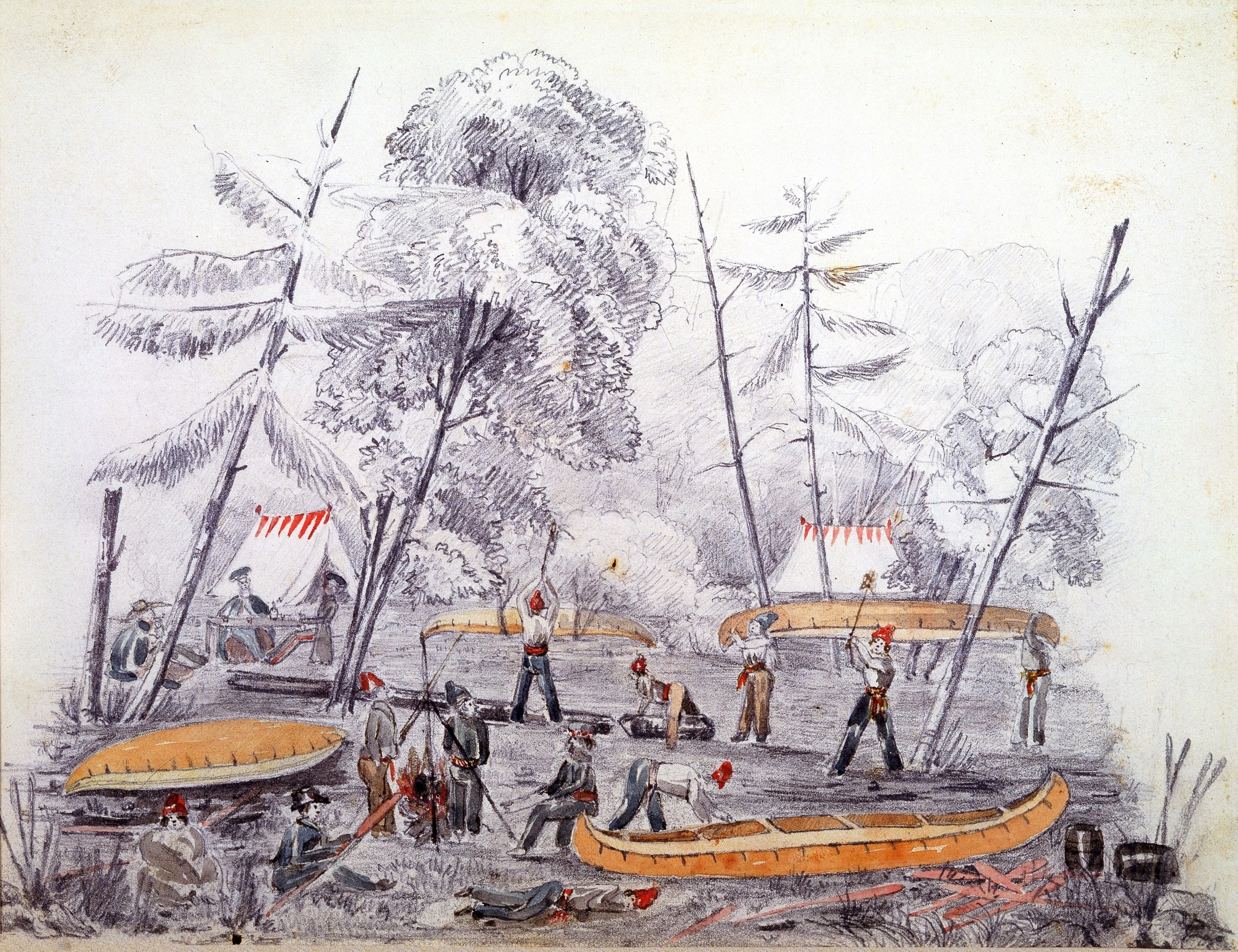
Camp used by soldiers and labourers of the Rideau Canal on the south side of the Ottawa River in 1826

In April, By put out press advertisements offering free provisions and housing to stonemasons and miners willing to work on the canal. The job market was heavily saturated at the time due to a surplus of migrant labour from England and Lower Canada. As a result, many civilian workers were drawn to the project. The workforce varied from between 2,000 to 5,000 at any given time—a combination of primarily English, French, Irish, and Scottish workers. These were supplemented by members of the Royal Sappers and Miners.

The Rideau Canal was primarily constructed by hand—sometimes with the use of animals for hauling tasks but without significant aid from mechanical tools. Earth was generally cleared using pickaxes and shovels and removed from the site using wheelbarrows and horse-drawn carts. Most workers worked 16-hour days, six days a week, and the majority lived in shanty towns around Bytown and Kingston. Conditions in these towns varied considerably depending on the contractor. However, malaria outbreaks were common throughout construction—as were cholera, dysentery, influenza, smallpox, tuberculosis, and typhoid fever. The use of gunpowder for excavation also proved dangerous, with several workers being killed in explosions. Despite these difficulties, the canal was completed in 1832, with By and his family travelling its length by boat that May.

=== Shiners' War ===
After the canal's completion, a group of newly unemployed Irish workers led by Peter Aylen founded a gang called the Shiners (Note: Historian David Lee argues that the name "shiner" was a reanalysis of the French word chêneuer, meaning "oak-cutter".) to drive skilled French Canadian workers out of the labour market. Aylen's Shiners employed violent tactics against their enemies, launching raids on French Canadian-owned timberlands, destroying watercraft, attacking civilians, blowing up homes, burning stables, and poisoning wells, among other things. Many people were driven out of Bytown. In response, By employed members of the Royal Sappers and Miners to act as an impromptu "street patrol". Later that year, Aylen sold his assets in the area and moved to Aylmer, Quebec.

== Capital debate ==
To reduce the power held by French Canadians after the failed Lower Canada Rebellion in 1837, Upper and Lower Canada were united into the Province of Canada in 1840. The act that united the provinces did not specify a capital. After some deliberation, Kingston was chosen, but this decision was overturned, and the capital was moved to Montreal in 1843. Despite this, many local notables, such as By and Thomas McKay, believed that Bytown was a strong candidate for capital. Press outlets like the Bytown Gazette, Montreal Herald, and Quebec Gazette made similar arguments.

=== Continued growth ===
Bytown Plan, 1842 1. Barracks Hill 2. Wellington Street 3. Victoria Street (now Lyon) 4. Kent Street 6. Sparks Street. The Rideau Canal is on the top right. Wellington Street was incomplete, and a path formed a bulge instead leading to Sappers Bridge (at the site of present-day Plaza Bridge) over the canal.

After the passage of the 1843 Ordnance Vetting Act, which overturned an earlier provision that prevented people from buying property and requiring them to rent from the Board of Ordnance, the population grew. A new class of primarily Irish and French Canadian landowners emerged. Several new institutions were founded, including a hospital and the College of Bytown (the present-day University of Ottawa). Bytown officially incorporated on January 1, 1850.

The logging industry also expanded, with the Ottawa Valley producing more raw timber than the rest of Canada combined by the 1840s. In 1846, overproduction led to a market crash, but the industry largely recovered by 1850. As the city and surrounding logging industry grew, many Algonquins were displaced from their traditional lands. Throughout the 1840s, they filed petitions for land to be set aside for them in the present-day area of Gatineau. In 1851, the government of Lower Canada created two reserves: one at Maniwaki and one near Témiscaming.

=== Stony Monday Riot ===
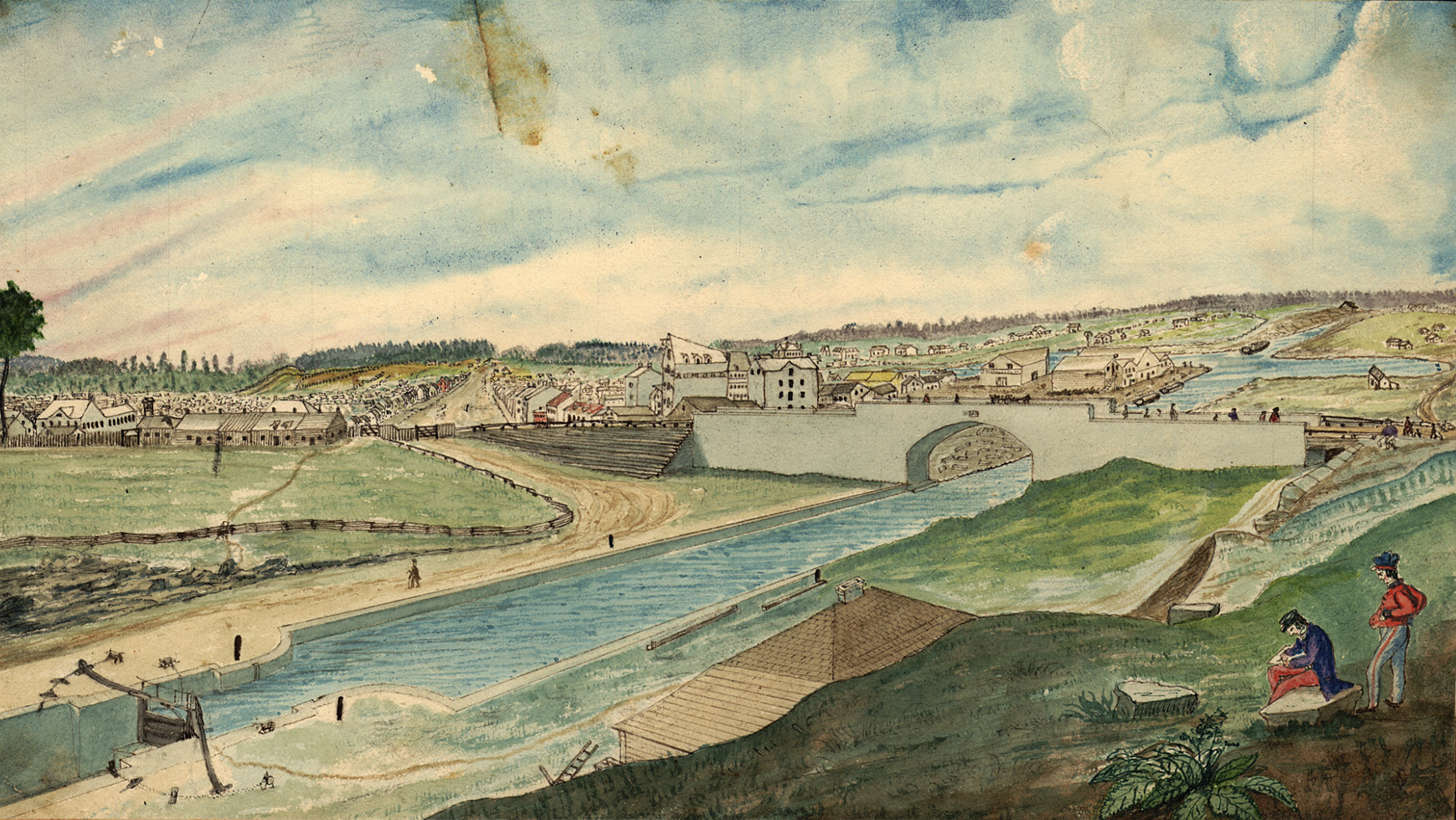
An armed standoff between Tories and Reformers took place at Sappers Bridge in 1849.

In 1849, the Parliament of the Province of Canada passed the Rebellion Losses Bill, which compensated property owners for losses incurred during the Lower Canada Rebellion. This included those who had supported the rebellion, provided they had not been convicted of any crimes or left the country. Many conservative Tories opposed the bill, arguing that it would benefit insurrectionary patriotes who rebelled against the government: "payment for disloyalty". They also viewed it as evidence of their declining power amidst the rise of responsible government. In response, rioting Tories in Montreal burned down the Parliament Buildings in Montreal. Believing the city to be unsafe, James Bruce, 8th Earl of Elgin and governor general of Canada, began searching for a new capital.

As part of his search, Elgin visited Bytown in September. Demographically, Bytown was split between Tories, who were largely upper-class and lived in Upper Town; and Reformers, who were largely working-class and lived in Lower Town. The Reformers called for a public welcoming meeting for Elgin in the town square. However, Tories like Mayor Robert Hervey opposed the meeting. Tories from the surrounding region flooded into the city, many armed, and attempted to disrupt the meeting. A firefight broke out, killing one and injuring 24. Hervey also deputized members of the Royal Canadian Rifle Regiment to arrest Reformers. Two days later, after a standoff between Tories and Reformers at Sappers Bridge (at the site of present-day Plaza Bridge), the Reformers stood down.

Ultimately, Elgin decided to delay his visit to Bytown. In October, on the Executive Council of the Province of Canada's advice, Parliament passed a bill instituting a system whereby the capital would systematically cycle between Toronto and Quebec City for periods of four years each. However, Henry Grey, 3rd Earl Grey and Secretary of State for the Colonies, noted that the arrangement lacked "an air of permanence" and that it would be "difficult to manage".

=== Becoming Ottawa ===
Bytown's name was a point of contention, with various proposals to change it over the years. In 1853, the town council decided that it was hindering the town's selection as the capital and that it would need to be changed. Conversations took place in 1854, the bicentenary of an Odawa trade mission to Montreal. In honour of this anniversary, the city adopted the standard English spelling of the name of the Ottawa River and was renamed Ottawa. The name change became official on January 1, 1855. In the ensuing celebrations, Mayor Henry J. Friel remarked:

To this common centre all parties must turn ere long; the finger of destiny points hitherward, and I doubt not that metropolitan honours await the City just ushered into existence.

=== Becoming capital ===
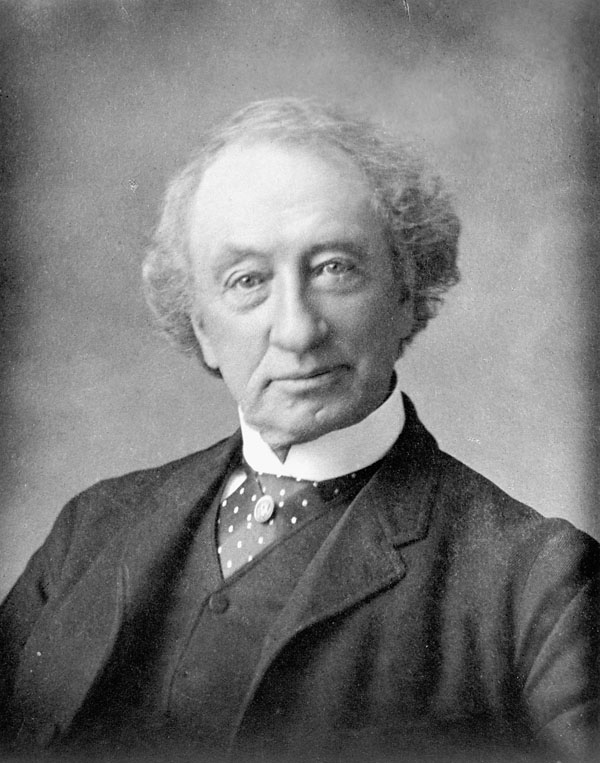
Joint Premier (Note: The Province of Canada was governed by two Joint Premiers, with one leading Upper Canada and the other leading Lower Canada. Officially, one of these Premiers took precedence and was responsible for forming the government.) John A. Macdonald supported Ottawa's appointment as capital after the Queen's decision in 1857.

Debate over the capital's location continued throughout the mid-1850s, with the alternating system proving unpopular for many MPs because of the distance between the capitals. Moving the capital was also expensive, costing the government £71,726 in 1855 (equivalent to £6,700,000 in 2025). When parliamentary proceedings throughout 1856 failed to produce a decisive answer to the problem, the issue was referred to Queen Victoria for review.

Each of the cities in contention sent memoranda to the Colonial Office, with Ottawa's memorandum arguing that its central location made it an ideal candidate. Other evaluations were submitted by Governor General Edmund Walker Head, who argued for Ottawa, as well as two military evaluations that favoured Quebec City. After assessing the memoranda, the Colonial Office recommended Ottawa as the capital. This recommendation was then approved by the Cabinet of the United Kingdom and the Queen. Head received word of the decision on December 31, 1857.

The Queen's decision caused considerable controversy, with several MPs tabling resolutions opposing it. Despite opposition from Joint Premier John A. Macdonald, these resolutions passed with support from Opposition Leader George Brown. This caused the Macdonald-Cartier ministry to resign. In its place, a Brown-Dorion ministry was appointed, but this ministry immediately failed a confidence vote, and the Macdonald-Cartier ministry returned to power. This ministry stated that it would support the Queen's decision, and after much debate, a second motion opposing Ottawa was defeated on February 10, 1859.

== Modernizing capital ==
=== Constructing Parliament ===
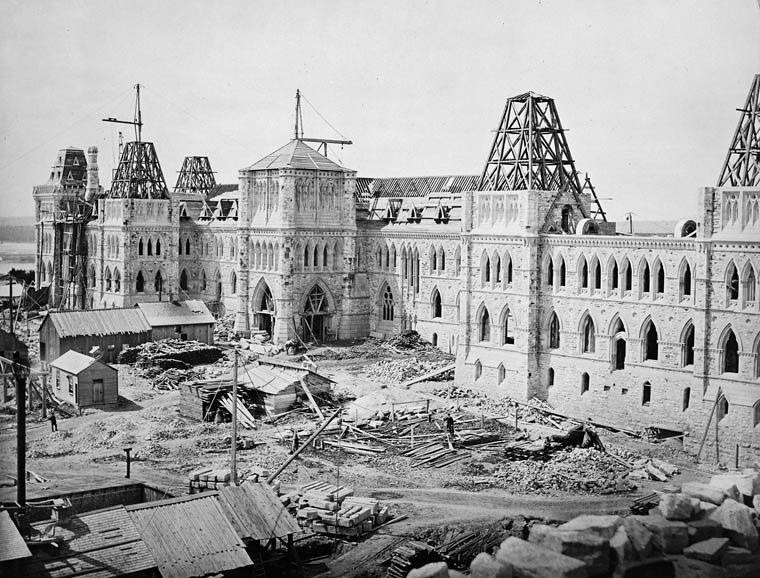
The Centre Block of Parliament Hill was designed by architects Thomas Fuller and Chilion Jones.

In May, Railway Inspector and Deputy Public Works Commissioner Samuel Keefer invited architects to submit designs for Parliament Hill. The final designs included the Centre Block designed by Thomas Fuller and Chilion Jones and the East and West Blocks designed by Thomas Stent and Augustus Laver. Workers began arriving in 1859 to work on the construction of the buildings and in the adjacent brickyards, lumberyards and quarries (the buildings were constructed primarily from local Nepean sandstone).

The cornerstone was laid by Prince Edward of Wales in September 1860. Initial construction work met with a number of challenges, including budget shortfalls, shortages caused by the sudden increase in population, and inflation. A strike in May 1860 led to an increase in worker pay, but work hours remained long and safety provisions were inadequate, leading to at least one death. Despite this, by 1861, Ottawa's population had grown from 7,760 in 1851 to 14,669, more than doubling in size as manual labourers, tradespeople, and civil servants moved to the new capital.

Funds completely ran out in 1862, leading to a pause in construction. This resulted in widespread unemployment and a wave of merchant bankruptcies. Construction resumed in 1863, but working conditions remained poor. In response—and despite laws that outlawed unions and banned workers from leaving employment without permission—the stoneworkers formed a union and staged several walkouts in 1864. Soon after, a number of other unions were formed, including the Ottawa Typographical Society.

The legislature officially opened in 1866, though construction continued until 1876. In March 1867, the Constitution Act united the Province of Canada with the provinces of New Brunswick and Nova Scotia to form the Dominion of Canada. The act went into effect on July 1 in what is now called Canadian Confederation. While Parliament Hill was not fully completed, the Fathers of Confederation agreed to keep Ottawa as the new dominion's capital.

=== Transforming city ===
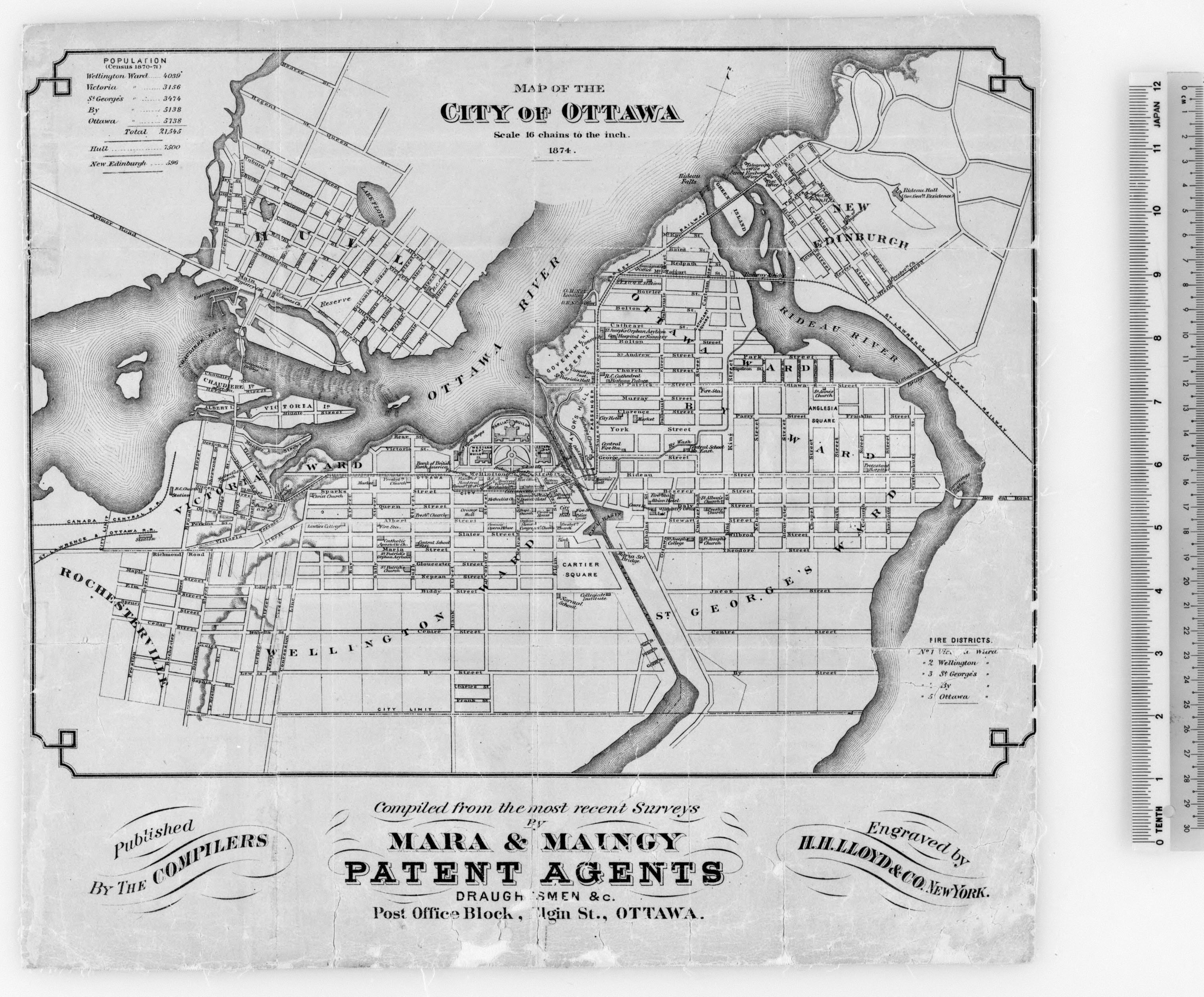
Map of the first streetcar route in Ottawa, drawn 1874

Despite the city's status as the capital, the government presence remained relatively small, confined primarily to Parliament Hill and Rideau Hall, which had served as the governor general's mansion since 1866. The city largely grew alongside commercial interests. These were dominated by the timber and sawmilling industries, which continued to displace Algonquin people in the region. Many Algonquins were advised to go either to the Maniwaki or Golden Lake Reserve—with the latter being established in 1873.

The city's first streetcars appeared in 1870. This service, operated by the Ottawa City Passenger Railway Company (OCPR), proved popular, carrying 273,000 passengers in its first year of operation. Organized labour also grew in power after the passage of the 1872 Trade Union Act, which led to the establishment of several new trade unions and a labour council. In 1873, however, the failure of the American Jay Cooke & Company bank and ensuing Panic of 1873 caused a global depression. The effects of the depression were felt in Canada, which experienced high levels of unemployment nationwide. The labor movement declined, and the OCPR's income was halved in 1874.

By 1879, the economy had largely recovered. Sawmilling subsequently reached its peak production during the 1880s with the introduction of bandsaws. The lumber processed at these mills was stored in piling yards throughout the National Capital Region—some awaiting sale and some awaiting further processing. While Ontario lumber was previously been exported primarily to Britain, by the 1880s, it was being shipped in large quantities to the United States, South America, and the West Indies as well. However, as the region's forests were depleted, the industry declined and production dropped throughout the late 1880s and 1890s. In response, many mill owners shifted to producing other wood-based commodities like paper and pulp.

At the same time, the Knights of Labor tried to organize the lumber mills in the Ottawa-Hull area, starting a major strike in 1891 after falling lumber prices caused mill owners to cut wages. Over 2,400 workers participated in the strike—possibly the largest work stoppage in Canadian history at the time, per David Lee. Ultimately, the mills rescinded the wage cut, and some smaller mills agreed to institute a ten-hour working day. The Knights continued to organize lumber workers in Ottawa after the strike, creating a lumberworkers' local with 2,000 members and winning a ten-hour working day for all of its members in 1895.

=== 1900 fire ===
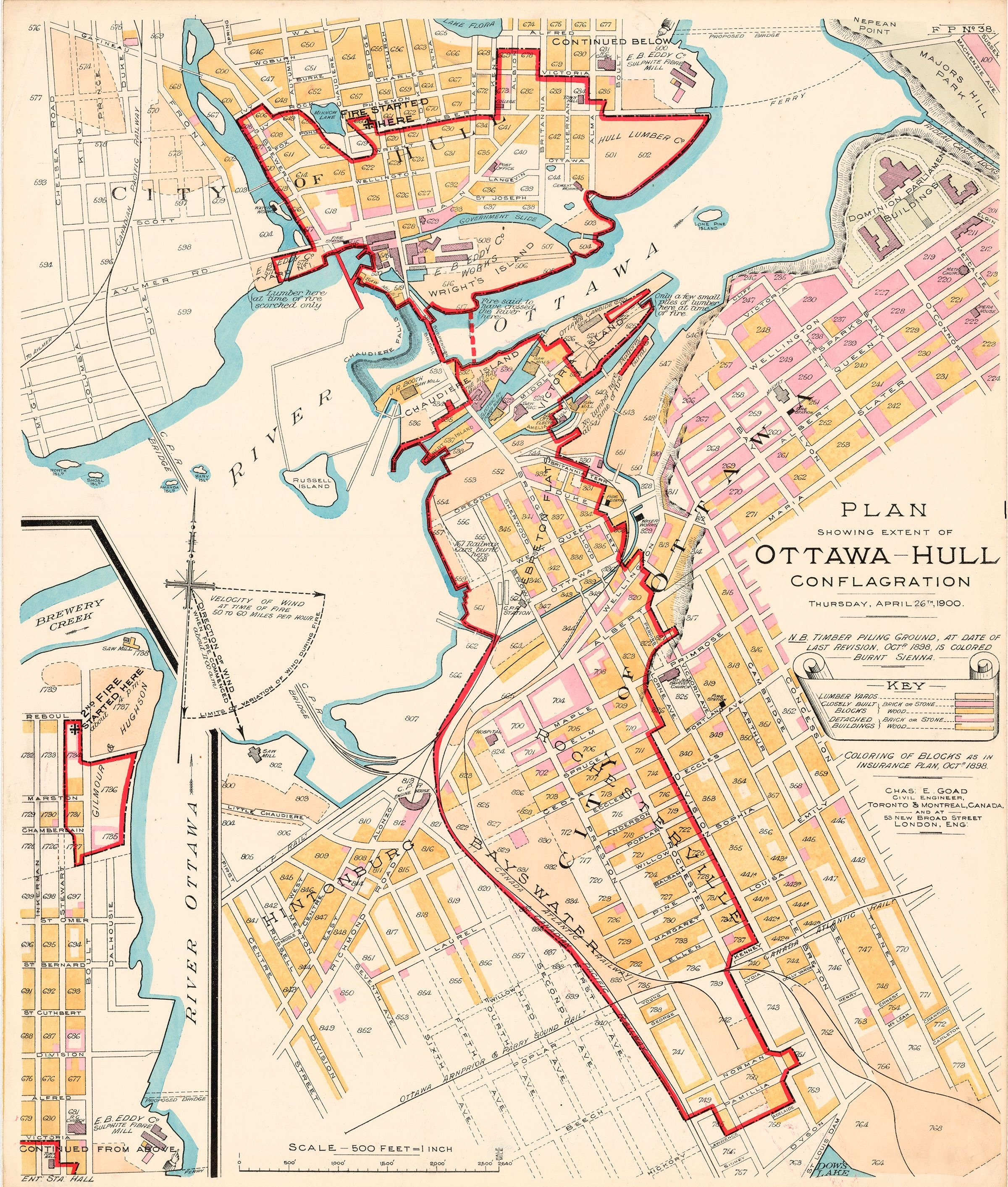
Area destroyed by the 1900 Hull–Ottawa fire

On April 26, 1900, at approximately 10:30 a.m, a small fire—likely caused by a defective chimney—broke out at the intersection of modern-day St. Redempteur and Vaudreuil streets in Hull. Driven by strong winds, the fire quickly spread throughout the city and crossed over to Ottawa at around 1:00 p.m, igniting lumberyards belonging to mill owners John Rudolphus Booth and Henry Franklin Bronson. From there, it spread to the industrial Chaudière district, destroying several power plants and other structures before continuing to the Rochesterville district. It continued to burn into the evening, finally subsiding around midnight April 27. A total of 7 people died, and over 1,900 buildings in Ottawa were destroyed, leaving between 8,000 and 14,000 people without homes. (Note: Roughly 8,000 were left without homes per Shorter and Fear, roughly 12,000 per Walsh, and roughly 14,000 per Lee.)

The fire left central Ottawa largely unaffected, but almost all of its lumberyards were completely destroyed. While overall output in the valley remained high, the sawmilling industry began to decline after the fire as investors shifted production towards commodities like paper and pulp. Relief efforts, which provided temporary shelter to those displaced, were managed by a relief committee composed of aldermen, merchants, and religious leaders. Meanwhile, politicians, reformers, and local press organs argued that the destroyed sections of the city should be modernized to better reflect the importance of the capital, manage the displaced population, and prevent another disaster.

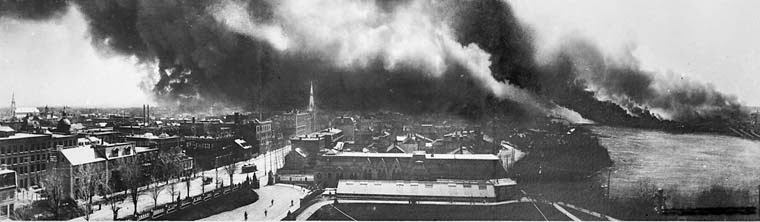
Panorama of the fire, which destroyed over 1,900 Ottawa buildings and left between 8,000 and 14,000 people without homes

=== Todd Plan ===
The Ottawa Improvement Commission (OIC) was founded in 1899 with the aim of improving the city into a fitting capital by purchasing land and maintaining driveways, parks, and streets. In 1903, the OIC commissioned landscape architect Frederick Todd to create a masterplan for the city: the Todd Plan. The Todd plan discussed the organization of Ottawa's park system—sketching out the plans for Gatineau Park, recommending the expansion of Rockcliffe Park, and suggesting the establishment of an interconnected web of suburban parks.. While it was not implemented due to budgetary and political constraints, this was the city's first official planning document.

=== Typhoid epidemics ===
In 1911, the city was struck by a typhoid epidemic caused by infected water from an emergency valve in Nepean Bay. Hundreds of new cases were reported in February, and by March, nearly 1,000 people were infected. Contagious disease was already common in many of the poorer parts of the city, but as the typhoid epidemic spread to middle- and upper-class districts, public health officials took notice. Reports by Ontario Health Officer J. W. McCullough and Committee of Conservation medical advisor Charles A. Hodgetts determined that the outbreak was caused by the civic authorities' failure to treat the water with hypochlorite. In addition, public health officials were stretched thin. As a result, most of the city's plumbing did not meet municipal standards.

This first epidemic, which killed 83 people, began to abate in March. However, despite the installation of a new intake pipe, the city continued to draw about 8% of its water from the old contaminated intake pipe. Bacterial testing two weeks after the pipe's installation showed signs of contamination, but the matter was left unexamined despite warnings from food inspector J. B. Hollingsworth. As a result, in June 1912, another epidemic broke out. This epidemic continued into September, forcing businesses to shut down during the busy summer season. In all, by the time it subsided in September, almost 1,400 people had been infected. 91 people died—for a total of 174 killed between the two epidemics.

== The World Wars ==
=== World War I ===
==== Mobilization ====
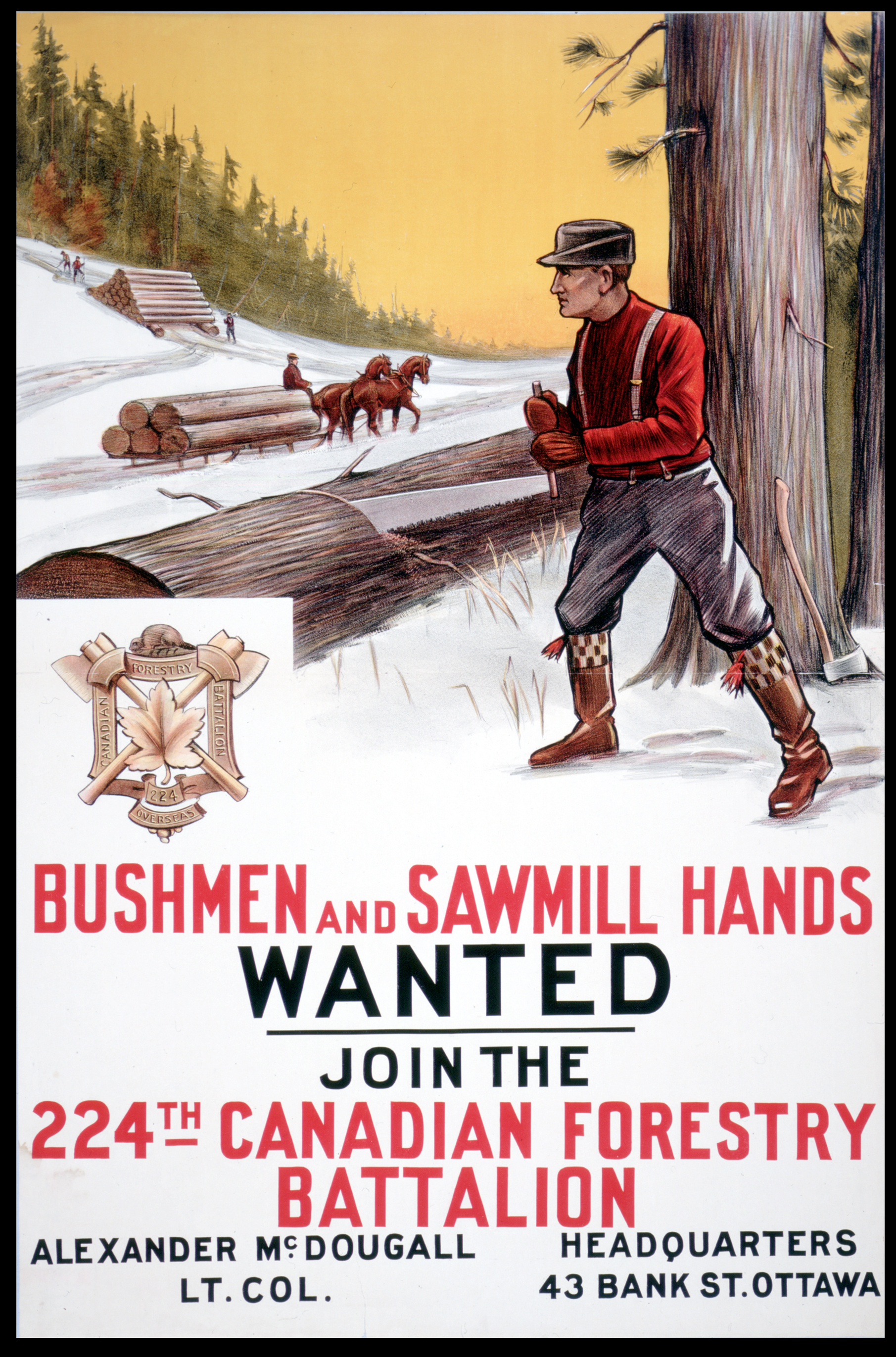
Recruiting poster for the 224th Battalion, CEF, one of several battalions mustered in Ottawa during World War I

When the United Kingdom declared war on Germany, entering World War I, Canada was also drawn into the conflict. Soon after, Ottawans started holding recruitment parties across the city. Within six months, 1,200 men from Ottawa were drafted to serve in the 1st and 2nd Canadian Divisions. In Europe, these divisions encountered poor facilities and supply bottlenecks. They also struggled under the leadership of Minister of Militia and Defence Sam Hughes, who insisted that they use Canadian-made Ross rifles known for jamming on the battlefield.

By 1915, recruitment slowed, with only 256 men recruited for the 38th Battalion in January 1915. Still, beginning in 1915, several new military units composed of Ottawa men were formed, including the Princess Louise Dragoon Guards and the 77th, 207th, 224th, 230th, and 238th Battalions. The federal government also designated several blocks of buildings for use as military offices between 1915 and 1916.

==== 1916 Parliament fire ====
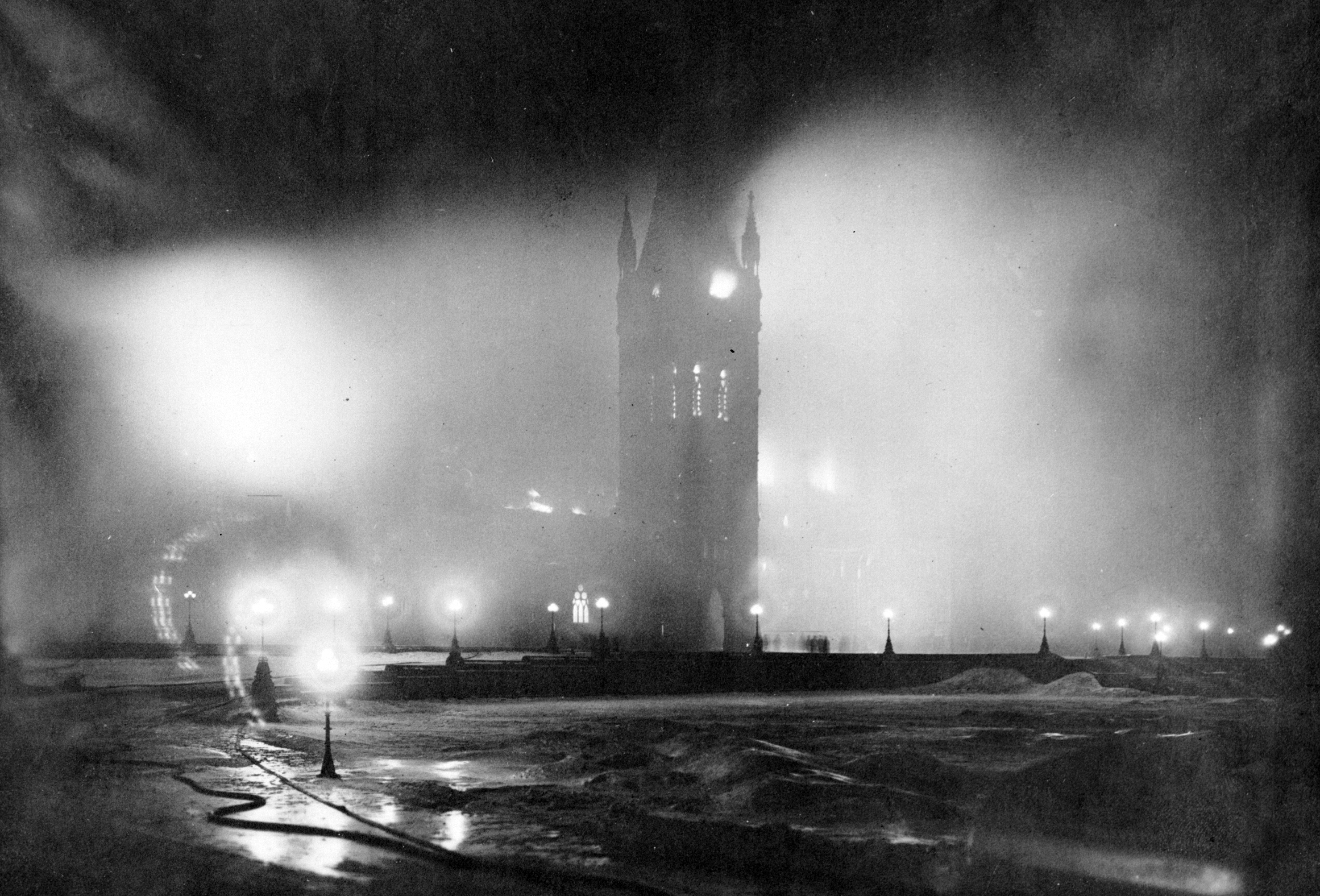
The Centre Block of Parliament burned in 1916.

In the evening of February 3, 1916, while Canada was at war, a fire broke out in the reading room of the Centre Block of Parliament. Once the fire ignited the papers in the room, it spread quickly. Prime Minister Robert Borden and a small group of MPs who were in session at the time were warned of the fire and evacuated as smoke entered the chamber. While firefighters arrived on the scene swiftly, flames completely engulfed the building by 10:00 p.m, and the tower's bell fell some time before midnight. At 1:21 a.m. on February 4, the central tower collapsed in its entirely. Seven people died in the fire.

In the aftermath of the fire, many suspected that it was the work of German saboteurs. Local authorities interrogated people with German-sounding surnames, with a man named Charles Sloney being arrested in Windsor, Ontario. The evidence against him included an alleged "foreign accent" and a postcard of Parliament that he was carrying. He was ultimately released. A Royal Commission was established to investigate the cause of the fire. Explanations explored by the commission included arson, faulty electrical wiring, and an improperly discarded cigar or cigarette, but its findings were inconclusive.

==== 1918 influenza pandemic ====
In 1918, a strain of deadly influenza emerged—its exact origins disputed. (Note: While the 1918 influenza outbreak is sometimes known as Spanish flu, the virus did not originate in Spain. The uncensored Spanish press were the first to report on the disease, hence the name. Bacteriologist Edwin O. Jordan identified three possible sources for the outbreak: military installations in Britain and France, the small town of Haskell in the United States, or China. The European origin hypothesis is supported by virologist John Oxford; the American origin hypothesis by historian John Barry and Jordan himself; and the Chinese origin hypothesis by economist Christopher Langford, historian Dorothy A. Pettit, and public health researcher Janice Bailie.) The date of its arrival in Canada is also disputed, though historian Mark Osborne Humphries argues that the strain might have appeared in Ottawa between January and April. (Note: Historians Janice Dickin McGinnis and Eileen Pettigrew argue that the strain arrived in the summer of 1918.) The first officially recorded outbreak occurred in September in Victoriaville, Quebec, and the first officially recorded outbreak in Ottawa occurred later that month. The disease spread quickly after that, killing 440 people in October—mostly young adults.

The Ottawa Board of Health introduced measures to close schools, churches, and other public spaces. These measures were met with opposition from clergy, retail merchants, and some members of the general public. Meanwhile, the virus continued to spread, particularly affecting the city's lower classes amidst high medical expenses, lost income, and price gouging for essential items like face masks, firewood, and medicine. The disease began to subside in November 1918, having killed over 500 people in the Ottawa area by the end of the year.

=== Interwar period ===
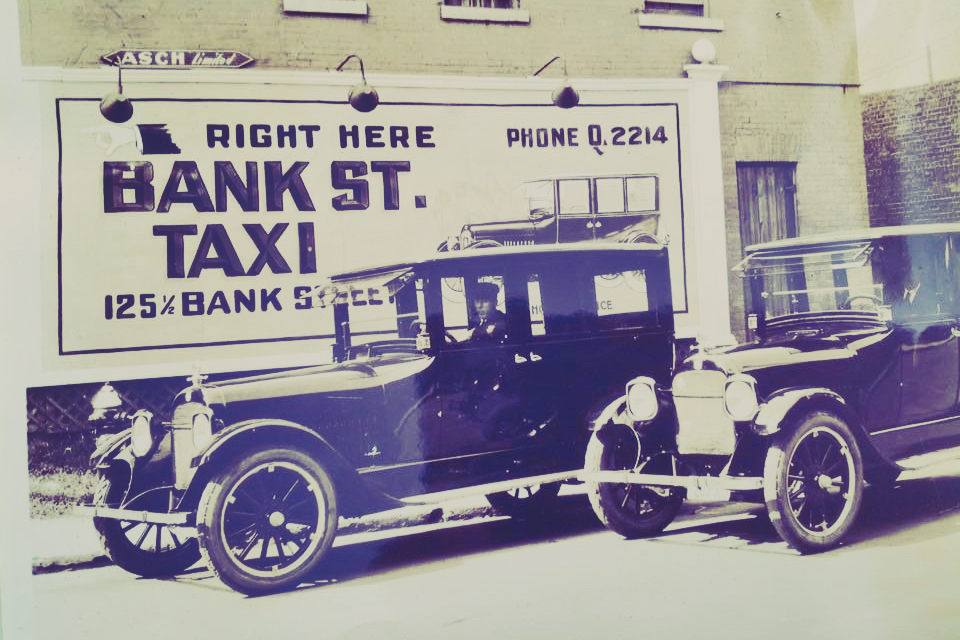
The cost-effectiveness and timeliness of Ottawa streetcars began to decline in the 1920s amidst competition with private automobiles, motorized buses, and taxis.

The fighting of the First World War ended with the signing of an armistice on November 11, 1918. Canadians began to return home in 1919. Returning soldiers were met with parades in Ottawa. However, at the time of their return, Canada was experiencing a housing shortage caused by inflation, scarce resources, and the unwillingness of businesses to invest in housing projects during wartime. Many feared social unrest as soldiers returning from the front met with this dearth of available housing.

In response to this shortage, the Ottawa Committee of Conservation apportioned CAD $2 million to the city for housing construction. They also tapped Thomas Adams, an advocate for the garden city movement, (Note: The garden city movement, which originated in the United Kingdom via reformers Patrick Geddes and Ebenezer Howard, advocated for planned communities centred within agricultural greenbelts, arguing that access to green space is a fundamental human right.) to prepare a report on the housing crisis in the city. This report led to the development of the Lindenlea neighbourhood on an area purchased by the Ottawa Housing Commission for $66,000.

The postwar period also saw changes in the city's transit patterns. In 1919, 500 workers for the Ottawa Electric Railway (OER, the successor to the OCPR) struck amidst rising inflation and its converse: falling real wages. (Note: For more about labour unrest at the time, see Canadian Labour Revolt and Winnipeg general strike.) This strike led to the proliferation of unlicensed "jitney" taxis and a rise in automobile use. During the 1920s, automobile use rose even further. This led to a decrease in the cost-effectiveness and timeliness of the electric railway. (Note: Cost-effectiveness decreased due to the disparity in ridership between peak hours and basic service, which caused many of the OER's fleet to remain dormant during the day. This disparity was caused by steady demand for commuter service combined with a declining demand for leisure transit, with many using their automobiles for the latter. Timeliness was decreased because cars often blocked street traffic to park, take on passengers, or turn left.) Motorized buses also began to compete with electric streetcars as a form of public transit. In 1924, the OER agreed to a new franchise with the city that saw decreasing fares (Note: These fares were later increased in 1928.) and an investment of $3 million into the transit system by the OER—some of which went to modernizing its fleet. In return, it was exempted from municipal takeover and permitted to operate a bus service, among other things.

==== Federal District Commission ====
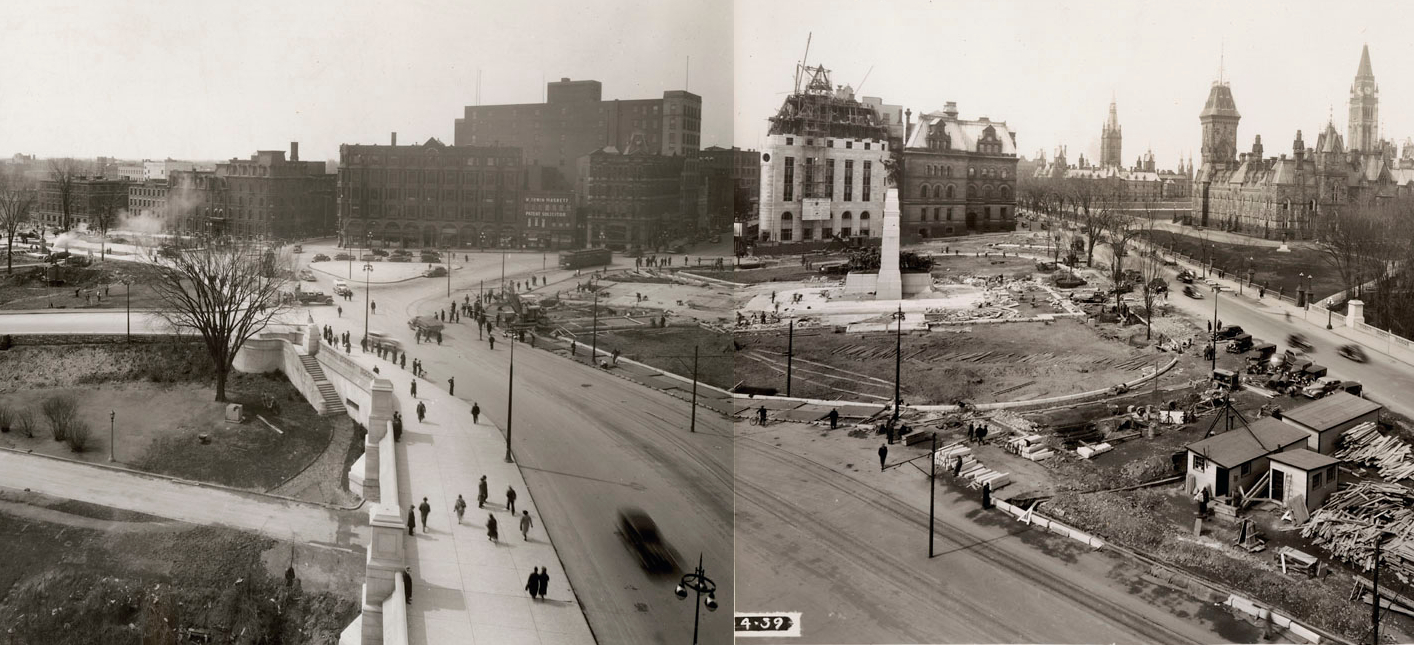
Planning for the National War Memorial and the development on Confederation Square began in the 1920s, though construction would not be begin until the 1930s.

After the end of the war, city planner Noulan Cauchon advocated for the construction of a war memorial at Connaught Place (as it was known at the time). These plans stalled until 1925, when the Ministry of Public Works, with the support of Prime Minister William Lyon Mackenzie King, issued a design competition for a war memorial on the site.

King, who was interested in city planning, founded the Federal District Commission (FDC) to replace the OIC in 1927. Under the direction of businessman Thomas Ahearn, the FDC took on several city improvement projects, including the construction of the Ontario half of the Champlain Bridge, the expansion of Elgin Street, and the development of the newly renamed Confederation Square—including the National War Memorial—though construction would not begin until the 1930s.

==== The Great Depression ====
A wave of stock sales hit American and Canadian markets in early September 1929. By late October, the market had crashed completely. The Great Depression ensued. The effects of the depression were first felt in Western Canada, but by the 1930s, its effects were being felt in the east as well. They were particularly acute in Ottawa's lower-class Chaudière and Lower Town districts.

At the time, unemployment relief in Canada was handled on a municipal level, and as the depression spread, both the federal and provincial governments initially denied municipal requests for further aid. While a federal relief bill was passed in 1930, its funds were quickly exhausted. (Note: Subsequent relief bills were passed annually for the duration of the depression.) Furthermore, a city council investigation in 1930 revealed that Bradford Broad, a cashier for the city treasury, had embezzled $18,454 (equivalent to $333,000 in 2025) in municipal funds, leading to budget shortfalls. Subsequent investigations revealed that Housing Commissioner Howard C. Latham was also embezzling funds. Broad was arrested and Latham was discharged alongside City Auditor W. A. Tolley.

===== Municipal disasters =====
Ottawa experienced a number of disasters during this time period as well. In May 1929, just before the depression, a three-mile section of the sewer exploded, causing significant property damage, many injuries, and at least one death. While explosives experts were assigned to investigate the explosion's cause, little action was taken, and in 1931, a second explosion occurred, causing even more property damage. Then, on March 31, 1930, city hall was severely damaged in a fire. Uninterested in restoring the building, which was described by architects W. E. Noffke and A. J. Hazelgrove as "an architectural aberration, in both form and detail", the city administration opted to move into the Transportation building's upper floors. The majority of the city's records were saved.

===== Relief =====
The depression reached its peak in Canada in 1933. Malnourishment and starvation were common for members of the lower class. Relief diets were poor, lacking in protein and calcium, and food aid could only be obtained from two grocery stores in the city. Unemployment benefits were usually provided in the form of work relief. However, direct aid became more common in 1933, when the Ottawa Public Welfare Department took control of relief services. The majority of employees were female social workers. In 1936, the Ottawa Police Service launched an investigation into the department, arguing that it spent too much time addressing humanitarian concerns and that the primary purpose of relief administration should be to address unemployment and prevent unemployment fraud. The department was then reorganized as the Social Services Department under the control of a small group of "male detectives".

=== World War II ===
==== Mobilization ====
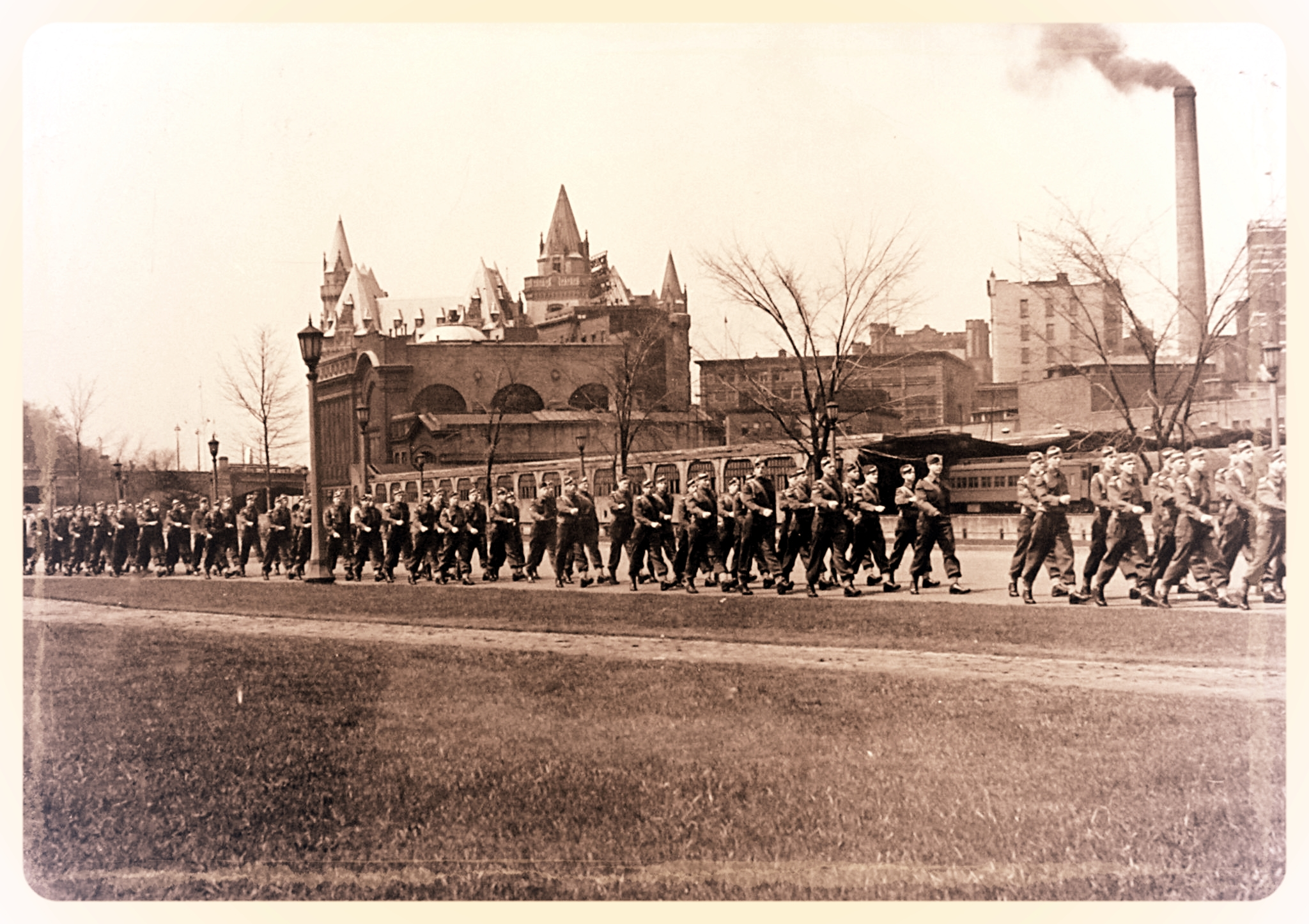
Soldiers in training near downtown Ottawa, 1943

On September 3, 1939, the United Kingdom and France declared war on Germany after its invasion of Poland. Canada followed suit on September 10. That year, a training centre for the Women's Royal Canadian Naval Service was temporarily established at the home of industrialist Ambrose O'Brien before moving to Galt. A basic training centre for soldiers and medical personnel was also established in Lansdowne Park in 1940. The Ottawa-based Governor General's Foot Guards, Cameron Highlanders, and Princess Louise Dragoon Guards arrived in Europe in 1940.

The population of civil servants in the city tripled in the following six years—mostly temporary workers and military personnel. Many buildings were constructed or appropriated for their use, including the Central Experimental Farm, which was used to transmit radio messages to Royal Navy and Royal Canadian Navy ships in the Atlantic. Many of these messages were then sent to the home of businessman Louis Baker on Laurier Street, where the National Research Council Canada's Examination Unit was headquartered.

==== Governments in exile ====
Civil servants from Belgian, Dutch, and Norwegian governments-in-exile stayed in Ottawa during World War II. As a result, many members of the Royal Canadian Mounted Police were transferred to Ottawa to protect consular facilities. Queen Juliana and Princesses Beatrix and Irene of the Netherlands also took shelter in Ottawa after the German occupation of the Netherlands. Princess Margriet was born to Juliana at the Ottawa Civic Hospital in 1943. The annual Canadian Tulip Festival commemorates the city's hospitality toward the royal family.

== Modern history ==
=== Postwar period ===
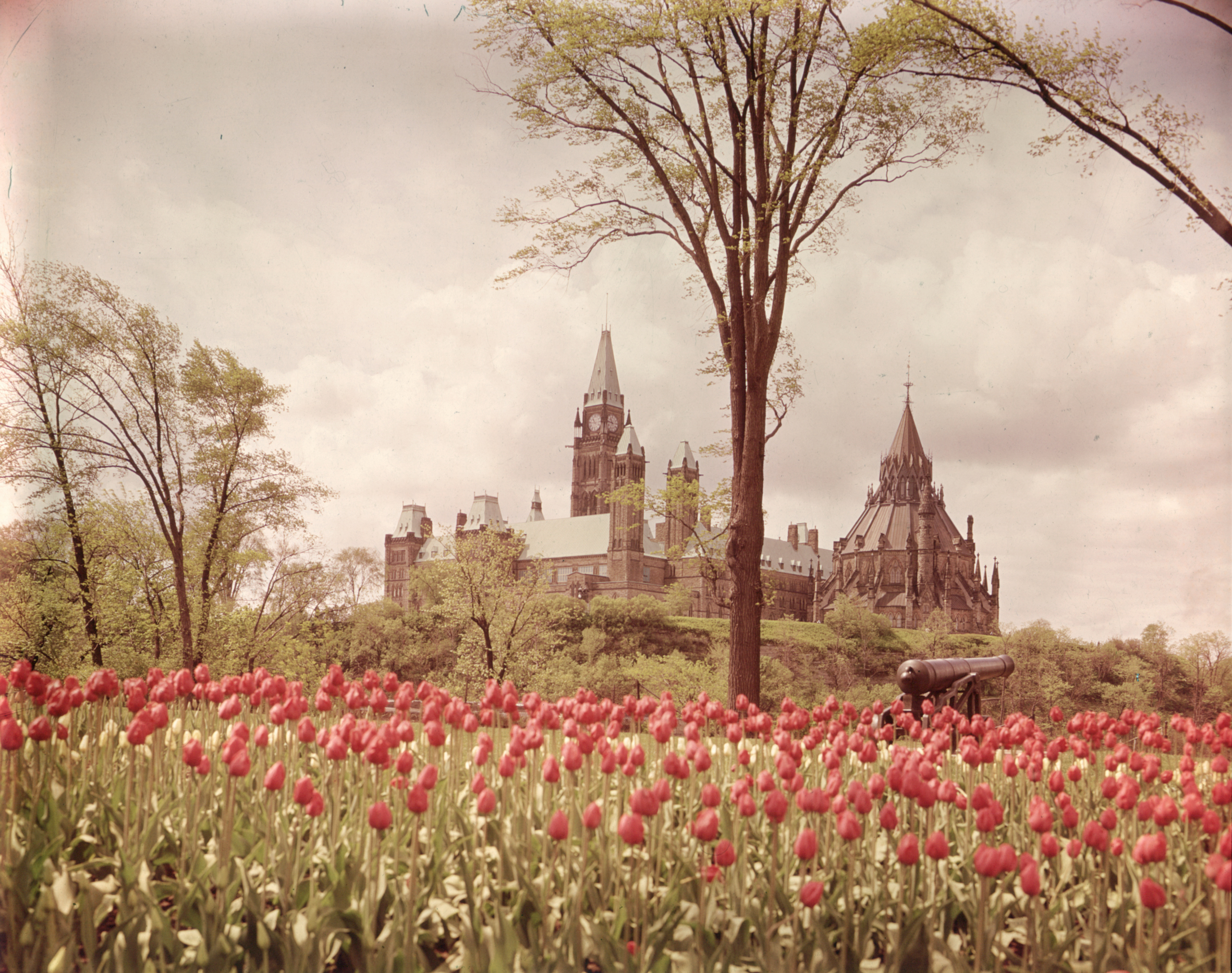
Ottawa's hospitality toward the Dutch royal family is commemorated by the annual Canadian Tulip Festival.

Germany surrendered to the Allies on May 8, and Japan surrendered on August 14, ending the war. Many of the government buildings constructed during wartime were demolished. The civil service also briefly became smaller, though by 1951 it was again growing rapidly. Industrial activity in Ottawa proper declined, with much of it moving to Gatineau. Meanwhile, the service industry grew—a change partially fueled by women's entry into the workforce. Women also worked in the civil service despite discrimination, and the first female mayor of a major Canadian city, Charlotte Whitton, took office in Ottawa in 1951 after the death of her predecessor, Grenville Goodwin.

==== Gréber Plan ====
The National Capital Planning Service (Note: The National Capital Planning Service was a division of the National Capital Planning Committee, an urban development organization founded by Prime Minister William Lyon Mackenzie King. It was separate from the Federal District Commission (FDC).) under city planner Jacques Gréber released its Plan for the National Capital in 1950. The plan recommended the construction of new transitways; the creation of a greenbelt; the expansion of the city's land; slum clearance in the LeBreton Flats neighbourhood; and the movement of government offices, industry, and rail from the inner city to the suburbs. King had secured a $25 million ($348 million in 2025) fund for the plan's execution in 1948, and some transit construction began before the plan was released.

Most of the remaining recommendations were implemented throughout the 1950s and 60s by the National Capital Commission (NCC). (Note: The FDC was renamed the National Capital Commission (NCC) in 1959.) In 1950, the city annexed large sections of nearby Nepean and Gloucester townships. Rail infrastructure was relocated to the suburbs, and land was appropriated for the greenbelt in the late 1950s. In 1962, the commission appropriated land in LeBreton Flats. It said publicly that the land would be used for government buildings and development along the Ottawa River. In private minutes, it also argued that the LeBreton Flats area was an "eyesore". Residents received eviction notices that year, and demolition began in 1965, displacing 600 families. The greenbelt was completed on the Ontario side of the river (Note: The greenbelt was originally planned to expand into Quebec, but these plans were dropped.) in 1966.

==== Social movements ====
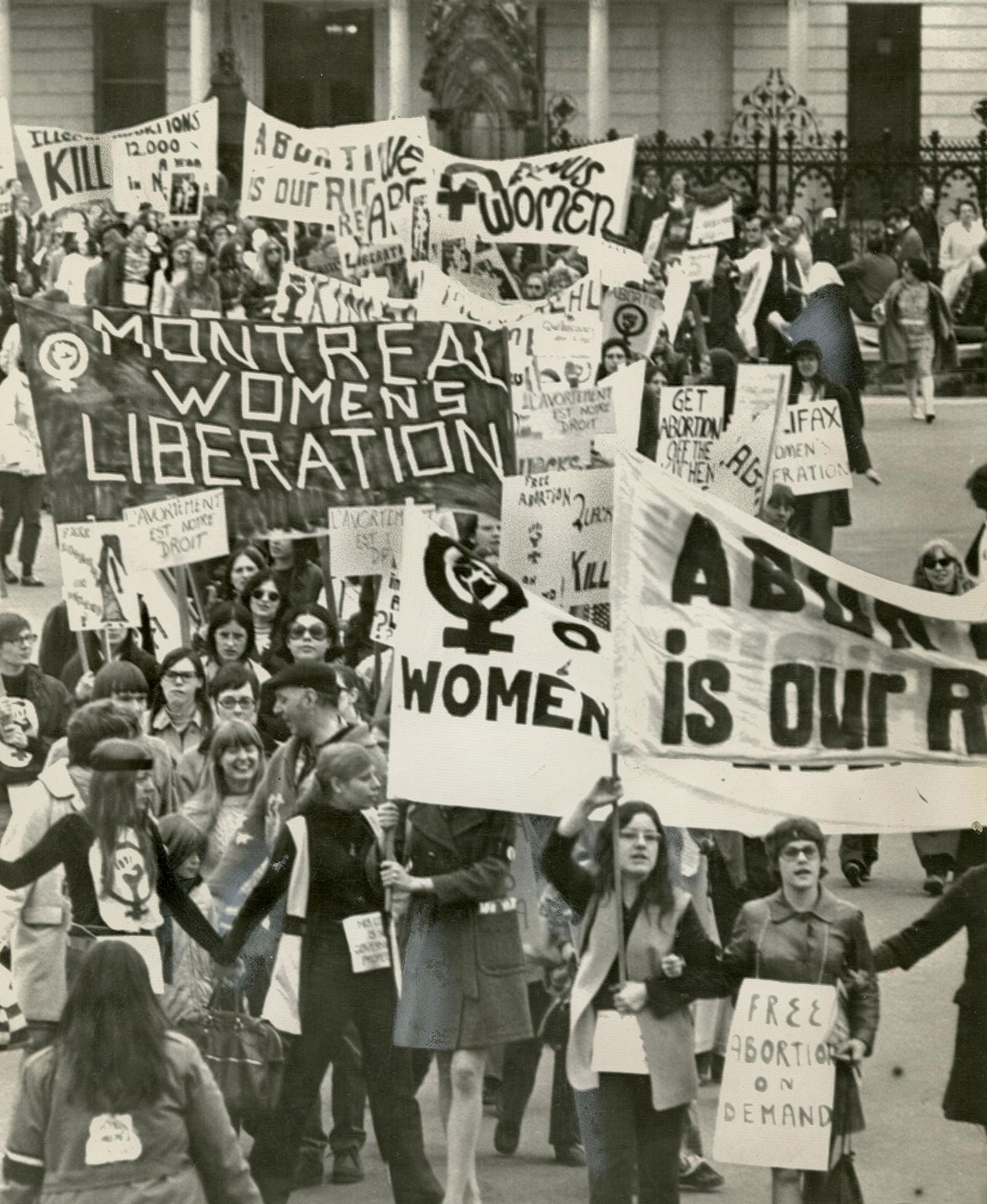
In April 1970, an "Abortion Caravan" made up of feminist organizations across the country travelled to Ottawa demanding free access to abortion.

As capital of Canada, Ottawa became a staging ground for protests and social activism during the mid-twentieth century. For example, in March 1954, members of the Negro Citizenship Association arrived in Ottawa to protest provisions of the Immigration Act of 1923 that they viewed as racially discriminatory—as at the time, unrestricted immigration to Canada from other nations within the British Commonwealth was limited to white people. Led by civil rights activist Donald Willard Moore and consisting primarily of Black Pullman porters, this delegation of 35 met with Minister of Citizenship and Immigration Walter Edward Harris. While the delegation did not yield immediate results, the government introduced the West Indian Domestic Scheme in 1955, which allowed a limited number of people from Jamaica and Barbados to enter the country. Then, in 1962, the government dropped race and nationality restrictions on immigration from Commonwealth countries.

The 1960s saw the beginning of the Quiet Revolution in Quebec and the attendant rise of French Canadian nationalism in Canada, with French language preservation as a centrepiece of the movement. Before this, attempts had been made to introduce bilingualism to Ottawa, including the incorporation of English and French skills into the civil service merit system in 1956. As the Quiet Revolution progressed and many French Canadians in Ottawa transitioned from blue- to white-collar professions, bilingual checks were introduced, and French was recognized as one of the official languages of the civil service. On a municipal level, the city council became an officially bilingual institution in 1972.

There were also major feminist and LGBTQ protests in the early 1970s. In April 1970, an "Abortion Caravan" made up of feminist organizations across the country travelled to Ottawa demanding free access to abortion, which was only available for certain medical reasons under Canadian law. When they arrived in Ottawa, the women chained themselves to chairs in the House of Commons gallery, causing the chamber to temporarily adjourn. Meanwhile, the "We Demand" rally, organized by the organization Toronto Gay Action in August 1971, was one of the largest LGBTQ protests held in the country at the time it was held. This rally inspired the foundation of Gays of Ottawa, the city's first major LGTBQ advocacy group, in September of that year.

In September 1974, 150 First Nations activists arrived in Ottawa for the Native People's Caravan, which arrived on the day of the opening of parliament. Responding to a Royal Canadian Mounted Police (RCMP) rendition of "God Save the Queen" with the "AIM Song", they demanded increased accountability from the Indian Affairs Department, funds for Indigenous communities and education, improved healthcare, and recognition of treaty rights for First Nations people regardless of status. Protesters breached the barricade at the base of Parliament's stairs (Note: Various accounts of this have event have been offered, including that the RCMP provoked the protesters by raising their bayonets at them and that the protesters deliberately breached the barricade to provoke a response from the government.) before being suppressed by RCMP riot police—the first time riot police were used against protesters on Parliament Hill.

=== Urban expansion and intensification ===
==== Regional Municipality of Ottawa-Carleton ====
Boundaries of the Regional Municipality of Ottawa-Carleton (RMOC), officially created in 1969

In 1968, Parliament passed the Regional Municipality of Ottawa-Carleton (RMOC) Act, which created a regional super-government consisting of Ottawa and several surrounding governments, including Carleton County and the city of Eastview (now Vanier). The RMOC, which officially came into being in 1969, was managed by a council of 31 people, each of whom was a member of one of the constituent municipalities' councils.

At the time, many members of the public argued that local governments should consult residents before making planning decisions, and during 1969, the RMOC commissioned several studies to solicit public feedback. After considerable debate, in 1974, the RMOC adopted a plan focused on developing public transit routes throughout the city (including the Transitway, which opened in stages between 1983 and 1996) and land in the Kanata-Glencairn region (which would be given priority), the Orleans-Queenswood Heights region, and the Carlsbad Springs region, as well as in the region south of the city.

==== Private-sector growth ====
During the 1970s and 80s, many local family businesses like A.J. Freiman Ltd. and Ogilvy's were displaced by large retail chains establishing stores in Ottawa. These included Eaton's, Hudson's Bay, and Sears. The Rideau Centre mall opened in 1983. The technology sector in the National Capital Region grew substantially during the 1980s. Large established companies like Bell-Northern Research and Mitel and smaller companies like Gandalf Technologies, NABU Network, and Norpak established offices in the area. This change was partially spurred by the 1983 establishment of the Ottawa-Carleton Research Institute (later the Ottawa Centre for Research and Innovation), an organization that connected universities with private industry. By the 1990s, employment in the private technology sector had overtaken government employment, partly due to cuts in civil service jobs.

==== Cultural development ====
A number of cultural institutions were established in Ottawa during the 1990s. After a campaign throughout the late 1980s, the Ottawa Senators returned to the National Hockey League as a franchise team in December 1990 and began playing in October 1992. (Note: The original Senators had relocated to St. Louis, Missouri, in 1934 after coming in last in the Canadian division.) In 1994, several major music festivals were also inaugurated. The first, Ottawa Bluesfest, took place in June. The second, the Ottawa Folk Festival (now the CityFolk Festival), took place in August and was sponsored by radio station CKCU-FM. Ottawa Fringe Festival, a fringe theatre festival, was inaugurated in downtown Ottawa in 1997.

=== Contemporary Ottawa ===
==== Amalgamation ====
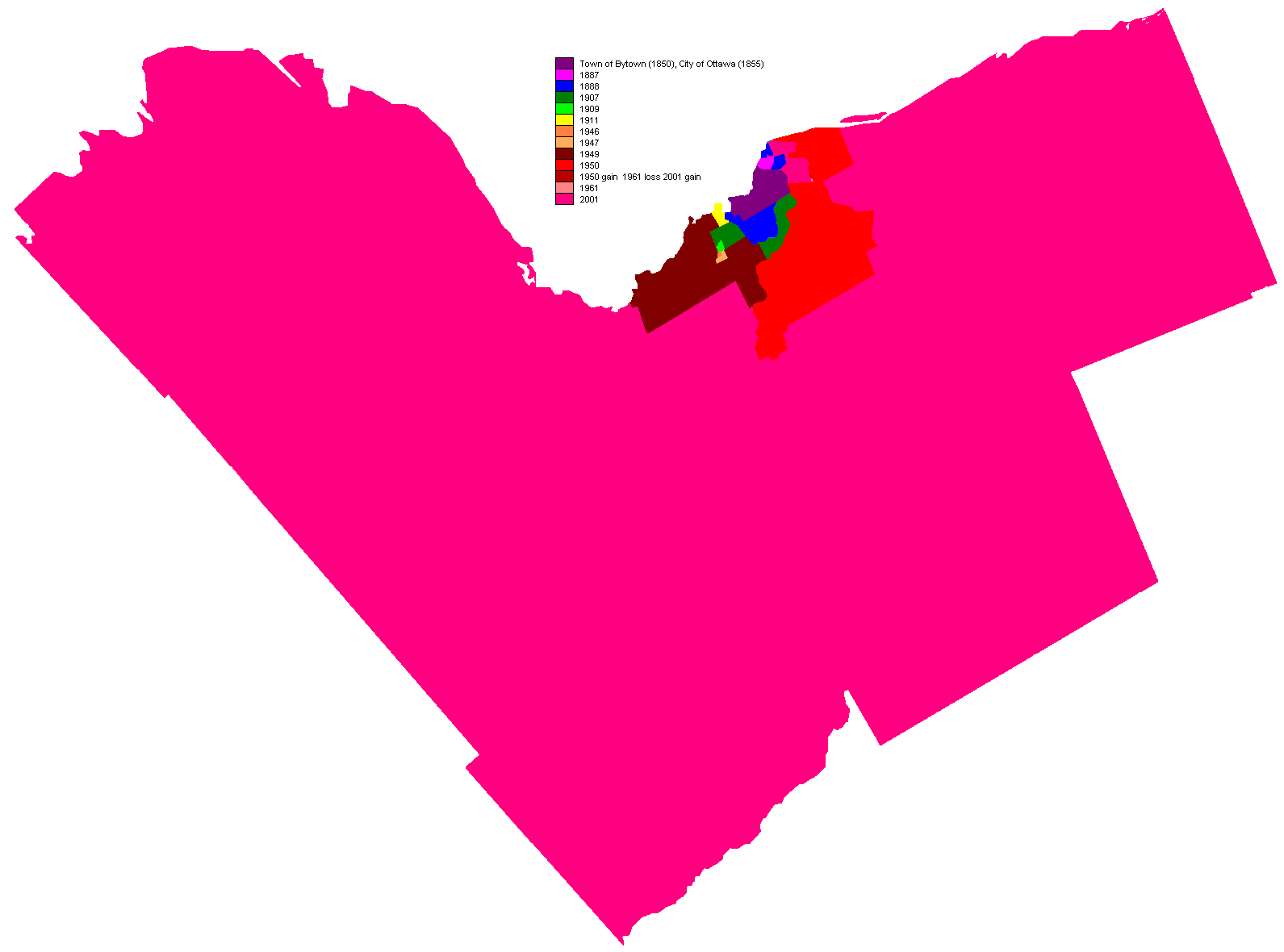
Annexation history of Ottawa to 2001

In 1999, the Ontario provincial government under Mike Harris gave the RMOC 90 days to develop a restructuring solution that would improve services, lower taxes, reduce the number of local politicians, and increase accountability for those politicians that remained. After being presented with several options, the provincial government opted to annex the independent governments of the RMOC into Ottawa proper. A transition board of seven members was appointed to manage this amalgamation, which officially took place in January 2001 despite opposition from political leaders from some of the amalgamated cities.

The amalgamation caused the city to experience short-term budget shortfalls due to the costs of restructuring and increased labour costs, as wage rates were often adapted from those of the city with the highest wages. Taxes did not decrease as anticipated, and budget shortfalls continued in subsequent years. This has resulted in a more polarized electorate, as residents of the urban core fear service cuts while many residents of the suburbs fear tax increases.

==== Ottawa 20/20 ====
During the late 1990s, the municipality projected that the city's population would grow by about 300,000 by 2021. Anticipating this projected increase, city planners turned their attention to creating a more robust transit system to accommodate the growing population. In 1999, the city approved $24 million in funds for the construction of a train line with service between Bayview and Greenboro and a stop near Carleton University. The line opened in October 2001, going $2.5 million over budget. Rides were initially free, with an average of 6,000 trips a day. When fares were introduced, ridership decreased to about 4,500 trips per day.

After a "smart growth" conference in 2001 that aimed to address the projected population increase, the municipality released its "Ottawa 20/20" master plan. This plan called for the development of city infrastructure and human services, arts and heritage preservation, ecological sustainability, and economic growth.

===== Light rail =====
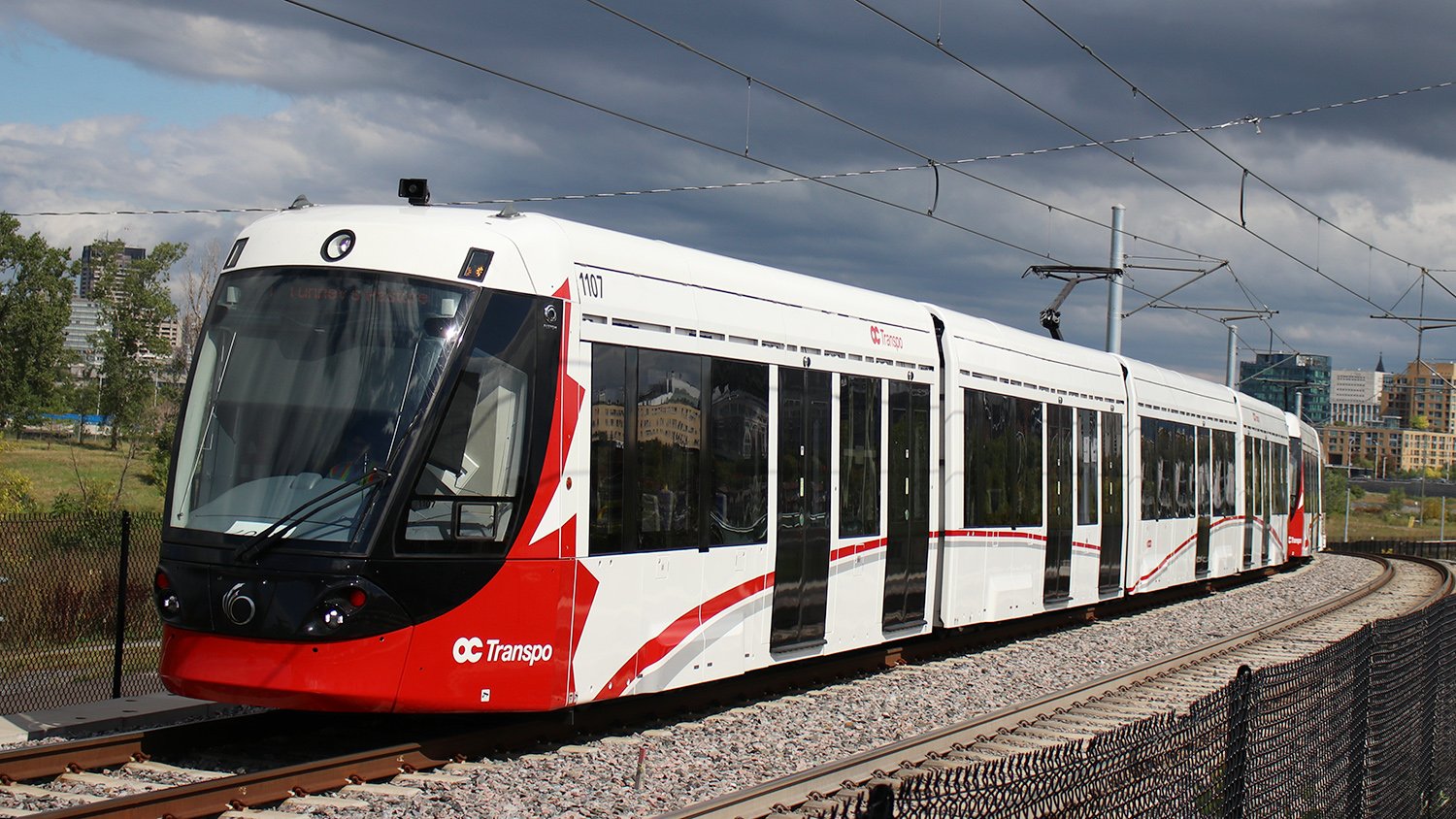
Ottawa's Line 1 opened in 2019 after several delays. Its opening was marred with problems, prompting the city to issue a default notice to the Rideau Transit Group, which managed the line.

In accordance with the Ottawa 20/20 plan, the federal and provincial governments pledged $200 million for a proposed north-south light rail line between downtown and Barrhaven in 2004 but withdrew it in 2006, leading to the project's cancellation in 2007. In 2012, the city council approved another light rail project—this one a line between Tunney's Pasture and Blair. The line was to be managed by the Rideau Transit Group (RTG), a private consortium, with funding from the federal and provincial governments. Construction began in 2013, and the line opened in 2019 after numerous delays and the opening of a number of sinkholes in 2016.

In 2020, the city issued a default notice to the RTG. The notice alleged that the consortium misrepresented its ability to construct and maintain the line, citing delays caused by damaged train equipment, inadequate heating, regular train shortages, and safety incidents. There was also a sewer leak in the line's tunnels in February, creating a smell like "rotten eggs" in some areas of the line. In 2021, it shut down for 54 consecutive days, prompting OC Transpo to offer fare-free travel for a month.

==== COVID-19 pandemic ====
The COVID-19 pandemic began with the emergence of SARS-CoV-2—first discovered in Wuhan, China, in 2019. The first case in Canada was confirmed in January 2020 and the first case in Ottawa was confirmed in March. That month, Ontario Premier Doug Ford ordered all non-essential businesses and schools to close. The first death in Ottawa was reported on March 25, prompting Mayor Jim Watson to declare a state of emergency. Unemployment rose sharply throughout the country, particularly for people who worked in close proximity with others. The first vaccines for COVID-19 were released in stages in Ottawa throughout the spring of 2021. By March 2023, 90,356 cases had been reported in Ottawa with 1,025 deaths.

===== 2022 convoy protest =====
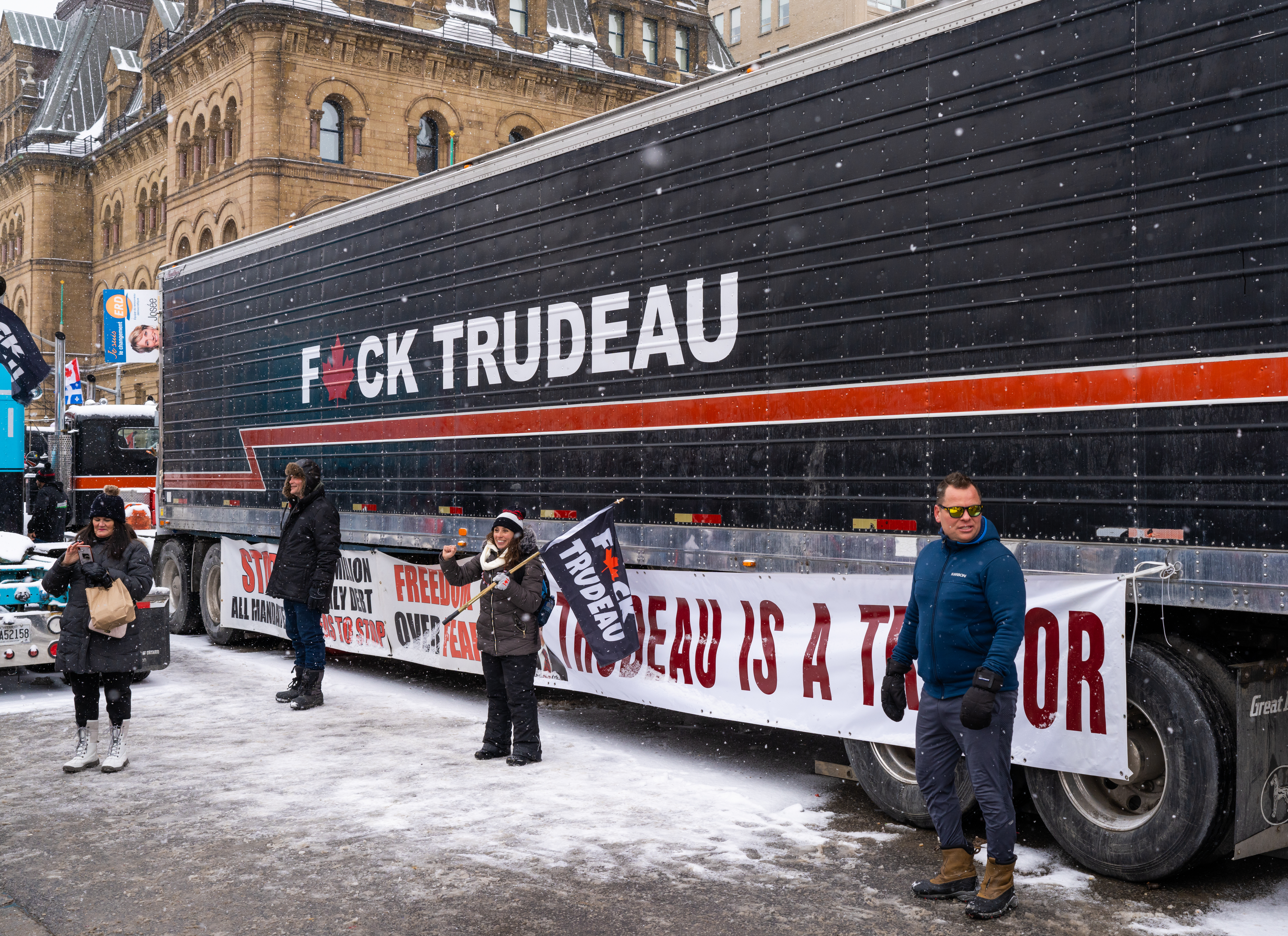
In early 2022, convoys from across the country travelled to Ottawa to protest federal requirements that mandated that cross-border truckers be vaccinated, occupying the city for over three weeks.

In January 2022, in response to a federal mandate that required cross-border truckers to be vaccinated, convoys from around the country began travelling across Canada towards Ottawa, arriving on the 29th and occupying the downtown core for over three weeks. They organized primarily on social media, with organizers including far-right activists Benjamin Dichter, James Bauder, Pat King, and Tamara Lich. The occupiers argued that they represented working-class Canadians betrayed by the federal government. Many were also motivated by Islamophobic and white nationalist ideologies, as well as conspiracy narratives.

Occupiers largely avoided acts of physical violence, but they did barricade major intersections, clutter the streets with fuel containers, harass local residents, set off fireworks, and fill the streets with the sounds of car horns, revving engines, air horns, train horns and loud music—depriving many of sleep. The Ottawa Police Service initially took a cautious approach to the protesters, avoiding confrontations and the removal of people or vehicles. On February 14, the federal government invoked the Emergencies Act, granting it additional law enforcement powers. On February 18, police began an operation to push the protesters out of the city. Many vehicles were towed, and police presence increased with assistance from the RCMP. Arrests continued throughout the week, and by February 23, the emergency declaration was rescinded.

== See also ==
- History of Ontario
- History of the Jews in Ottawa
- List of National Historic Sites of Canada in Ottawa
- Timeline of Ottawa history

== Sources ==
- Al-Dubikhi, Sami; Mees, Paul (2010). "Bus Rapid transit in Ottawa, 1978 to 2008: Assessing the Results". Town Planning Review. 81 (4): 407–424. doi:10.3828/tpr.2010.9. ISSN 0041-0020.
- Allaire, Gratien (2020). "Province of Quebec 1763-91". The Canadian Encyclopedia.
- Andrew, Caroline (2006). "Evaluating Municipal Reform in Ottawa-Gatineau: Building for a More Metropolitan Future?". In Razin, Eran; Smith, Patrick J. (eds.). Metropolitan Governing: Canadian Cases, Comparative Lessons (PDF). Jerusalem: Magnes Press. pp. 75–94. ISBN 978-965-7755-51-8.
- Andrew, Caroline; Doloreux, David (2012). "Economic Development, Social Inclusion and Urban Governance: The Case of the City‐Region of Ottawa in Canada". International Journal of Urban and Regional Research. 36 (6): 1288–1305. doi:10.1111/j.1468-2427.2011.01025.x. ISSN 0309-1317.
- Bacic, Jadranka (1999). The Influenza Epidemic of 1918 in Ottawa. Ottawa: Historical Society of Ottawa. ISBN 0-920960-76-6.
- Bagnall, James (2020). "Inside the Slow-rolling Disaster of Ottawa's $9-billion LRT Project". Ottawa Citizen.
- Barreyre, Nicolas (2011). "The Politics of Economic Crises: The Panic of 1873, the End of Reconstruction, and the Realignment of American Politics". The Journal of the Gilded Age and Progressive Era. 10 (4): 403–423. doi:10.1017/S1537781411000260. ISSN 1537-7814.
- Beland, Louis‐Philippe; Brodeur, Abel; Mikola, Derek; Wright, Taylor (2022). "The Short‐term Economic Consequences of COVID‐19: Occupation Tasks and Mental Health in Canada". Canadian Journal of Economics/Revue canadienne d'économique. 55 (S1): 214–247. doi:10.1111/caje.12543. ISSN 0008-4085. PMC 9111645. PMID 38607895.
- Berton, Pierre (2001). The Great Depression, 1929-1939. Toronto: Anchor Canada. ISBN 978-0-385-65843-0.
- Blewett, Taylor; Holder, Gord; Laucius, Joanne (March 25, 2020). "COVID-19: First Death Reported in Ottawa; State of Emergency Declared". Ottawa Citizen.
- Bowman, Sabrina (2007). Sustainability Assessment and the Ottawa 20/20 Growth Management Strategy (PDF) (Report). Waterloo: The Environmental Assessment and Planning in Ontario Project.
- Brown, Sophie (2024). Reversing the Flow: Name Reclamation and Knowledge Uncovering in Hodino̱hsho:nih Territory (PhD thesis). Syracuse: State University of New York.
- Butler, Don (2009). "A Very Different Strike in 1919". Ottawa Citizen.
- Campbell, Lara (2009). Respectable Citizens: Gender, Family, and Unemployment in Ontario's Great Depression. Toronto; Buffalo: University of Toronto Press. ISBN 978-0-8020-9974-7.
- Careless, J. M. S. (1985). The Pre-Confederation Premiers: Ontario Government Leaders, 1841-1867. Toronto; Buffalo: University of Toronto Press. ISBN 0-8020-3363-6.
- Chianello, Joanne (2021). "Fare-free Transit Doesn't Give Council a pass on LRT Failings". CBC.
- Collins, Richard (2021). Ottawa Mobilized: A Geographic Record of the City in Wartime. Ottawa: Historical Society of Ottawa.
- "Confederation Line LRT Project Approved by Council". CBC. 2012.
- Conrad, Margaret (2021). A Concise History of Canada. Cambridge; New York: Cambridge University Press. ISBN 978-1-108-68236-7.
- Crawford, Blair; Laucius, Joanne (2020). "COVID-19: Ontario to Close All Non-essential Businesses; Three New Cases in Ottawa". Ottawa Citizen.
- Delaney, Jill (1991). "The Garden Suburb of Lindenlea, Ottawa: A Model Project for the First Federal Housing Policy, 1918–24". Urban History Review. 19 (3): 151–165. doi:10.7202/1017590ar. ISSN 0703-0428.
- Dickinson, John Alexander; Young, Brian J. (2008). A Short History of Quebec. Montreal: McGill-Queen's Press. ISBN 978-0-7735-3439-1.
- Ditchburn, Jennifer (2016). "Parliament Hill Fire Mystery Still Unsolved 100 Years Later". CBC.
- Fear, Jon (1979). "'The Lumber Piles Must Go': Ottawa's Lumber Interests and the Great Fire of 1900". Urban History Review. 8 (1): 38–65. doi:10.7202/1019390ar. ISSN 0703-0428.
- Ferguson, Bob (1990). "Days of Glory: Ottawa's Original Senators Won Nine Stanley Cups". Ottawa Citizen. p. 28 – via ProQuest.
- Folsom, Steve; Daniels, Laura E. (2024). "'It Isn't Part of Our Language': Engaging Indigenous Peoples to Facilitate Self-Naming in Subject Headings". In Billey, Amber; Nelson, Elizabeth; Uhl, Rebecca (eds.). Inclusive Cataloging: Histories, Context, and Reparative Approaches. Chicago: Routledge. pp. 213–219. ISBN 978-1-78330-726-5.
- Foster, Cecil (2019). They Call Me George: The Untold Story of Black Train Porters and the Birth of Modern Canada. Windsor: Biblioasis. ISBN 978-1-77196-261-2.
- Fullerton, Christopher (2005). "A Changing of the Guard: Regional Planning in Ottawa, 1945-1974". Urban History Review. 34 (1): 100–112. doi:10.7202/1016050ar. ISSN 0703-0428.
- Gillis, Megan (2021). "COVID-19: Ottawans 70 and Older will be Able to Start Booking Appointments Monday". Ottawa Citizen.
- Glowacki, Laura (2020). "Rideau Station Stink Due to 'Stagnant' Water Leaking In, City Says". CBC.
- Gordon, David (2001). "Weaving a Modern Plan for Canada's Capital: Jacques Gréber and the 1950 Plan for the National Capital Region". Urban History Review. 29 (2): 43–61. doi:10.7202/1019205ar. ISSN 0703-0428.
- Gordon, David L. A.; Osborne, Brian S. (2004). "Constructing National Identity in Canada's Capital, 1900–2000: Confederation Square and the National War Memorial". Journal of Historical Geography. 30 (4): 618–642. doi:10.1016/S0305-7488(03)00041-0.
- Gowans, Alan; Noakes, Taylor C. (2024). "Parliament Hill". The Canadian Encyclopedia.
- Graham, Katherine A.; Maslove, Allan M.; Phillips, Susan D. (2001). "Learning from Experience?: Ottawa as a Cautionary Tale of Reforming Urban Government". Journal of Comparative Policy Analysis. 3 (3): 251–269. doi:10.1023/A:1012303416720.
- Graydon, Michael E. (2018). "'We Had Become a Community':Gays of Ottawa (GO) and the Birth of Community, 1971–7". Canadian Historical Review. 99 (4): 594–622. doi:10.3138/chr.2016-0001. ISSN 0008-3755.
- Green, Alan; MacKinnon, Mary (1988). "Unemployment and Relief in Canada". In Eichengreen, Barry; Hatton, T. J. (eds.). Interwar Unemployment in International Perspective. Dordrecht: Springer Netherlands. doi:10.1007/978-94-009-2796-4_10. ISBN 978-94-010-7758-3.
- Heidenreich, Conrad E. (1976). Explorations and Mapping of Samuel de Champlain, 1603-1632. Toronto: University of Toronto Press. ISBN 0-919870-17-1.
- Hele, Karl (2025). "Anishinaabe". The Canadian Encyclopedia.
- Hendricks, David; Philippot, Paul (1985). Ottawa Transportation: From Horses to Buses. Ottawa: Historical Society of Ottawa.
- Hillis, Ken (1992). "A History of Commissions: Threads of An Ottawa Planning History". Urban History Review. 21 (1): 46–60. doi:10.7202/1019246ar. ISSN 0703-0428.
- Hilton, Robert; Stoney, Christopher (2007). "Dreams, Deception and Delusion: The Derailing of Ottawa's Light Rail Transit Plans". Revue Gouvernance. 4 (1). doi:10.7202/1039114ar. ISSN 1912-0362.
- Joan Holmes & Associates (1993). Reports on the Algonquins of Golden Lake Claim (PDF) (Report). Vol. 2. Ottawa: Government of Canada.
- Kealey, Gregory S.; Palmer, Bryan D. (1995). "The Bonds of Unity: The Knights of Labor in Ontario, 1880-1900". In Kealey, Gregory S. (ed.). Workers and Canadian History. Montreal; Buffalo: McGill-Queen's Press. ISBN 0-7735-1352-3.
- Keshen, Jeff; St-Onge, Nicole J.M., eds. (2010). Ottawa: Making a Capital. Ottawa: University of Ottawa Press. ISBN 978-0-7766-0521-0.
  - Pilon, Jean-Luc; Marois, Roger. "Une question de temps: Plus de 6000 ans d'histoire dans la region de la capitale nationale du Canada". In Keshen & St-Onge (2010), pp. 21-38.
  - Clavette, Ken. "The 'Rag, Tag and Bobtail': The Rise and Fall of Ottawa's Early Working Class, 1860-1880". In Keshen & St-Onge (2010), pp. 151-164.
  - Walsh, John C. "Modern Citizens for a Modern City?: Ottawa's Great Fire of 1900". In Keshen & St-Onge (2010), pp. 165-184.
  - Taylor, John. "Engineering, Audit and Fire: Governance and Modernity in Depression Ottawa". In Keshen & St-Onge (2010), pp. 333-347.
  - Davis, Donald A. "A Capital Crime? The Long Death of Ottawa's Electric Railway". In Keshen & St-Onge (2010), pp. 349-382.
- Knight, David B. (1991). Choosing Canada's Capital: Conflict Resolution in a Parliamentary System. Ottawa: Carleton University Press. ISBN 978-0-88629-136-5.
- Lawrence, Bonita (2012). Fractured Homeland: Federal Recognition and Algonquin Identity in Ontario. Vancouver: UBC Press. ISBN 978-0-7748-2289-3.
- Lee, David (2006). Lumber Kings and Shantymen: Logging and Lumbering in the Ottawa Valley. Toronto: James Lorimer & Company. ISBN 978-1-55028-922-0.
- Legget, Robert (1986) [1955]. Rideau Waterway. Toronto; Buffalo: University of Toronto Press. ISBN 0-8020-2573-0.
- Leffers, Donald (2014). "Urban Sustainability as a 'Boundary Object': Interrogating Discourses of Urban Intensification in Ottawa, Canada". Sustainability in the Global City: Myth and Practice. Cambridge University Press. doi:10.1017/cbo9781139923316.022. ISBN 978-1-139-92331-6.
- Lloyd, Sheila (1979). "The Ottawa Typhoid Epidemics of 1911 and 1912: A Case Study of Disease as a Catalyst for Urban Reform". Urban History Review. 8 (1): 66–89. doi:10.7202/1019391ar. ISSN 0703-0428.
- "Map of Ontario Treaties and Reserves". Government of Ontario. 2024.
- Marr, William L.; Paterson, Donald G. (1981). Canada: An Economic History. Toronto: Gage. ISBN 978-0-7715-5684-5.
- Marsh, James H. (2015). "The Parliament Hill Fire of 1916". The Canadian Encyclopedia.
- Mills, David (2015). "Rebellion Losses Bill". The Canadian Encyclopedia.
- "Massive Sinkhole Closes Rideau Street in Downtown Ottawa". CBC. 2016.
- Miller, Jacquie (2021). "COVID-19: Ontario Announces Every Adult Eligible for a COVID Vaccine Starting End of May". Ottawa Citizen.
- Milner, J. B. (1969). "The Regional Municipality of Ottawa-Carleton Act, 1968". University of Toronto Law Journal. 19: 80–85.
- Moogk, Peter (2006). "The Netherlands and Canada, a Wartime Love Affair" (PDF). Canadian Journal of Netherlandic Studies. 27 (1): 1–14.
- Nester, William R. (2015). The French and Indian War and the Conquest of New France. Norman: University of Oklahoma Press. ISBN 978-0-8061-5189-2.
- Neville, George A. (2018). Loyalist Land Grants Along the Grand (Ottawa) River, 1788. Ottawa: Historical Society of Ottawa.
- Normandin, Marie-Soleil (2025). In the Name of Freedom: From Personal Grievance to Collective Dissent in the Freedom Convoy (PhD thesis). Ottawa: University of Ottawa.
- Osborne Humphries, Mark (2013). The Last Plague: Spanish Influenza and the Politics of Public Health in Canada. Toronto; Buffalo: University of Toronto Press. ISBN 978-1-4426-4111-2.
- "Ottawa Public Health Marks Third Anniversary of COVID-19 Pandemic Declaration". Ottawa Citizen. March 11, 2023.
- Palmer, Bryan D. (2009). Canada's 1960s: The Ironies of Identity in a Rebellious Era. Toronto; Buffalo: University of Toronto Press. ISBN 978-0-8020-9954-9.
- Payne, Elizabeth (February 24, 2021). "Ottawa to Begin Vaccinating People Over 80 Next Week, Ahead of the Rest of the Province". Ottawa Citizen.
- Powell, James. "Sabotage on Parliament Hill?". The Historical Society of Ottawa.
- Powell, James. "The Nabu Network". The Historical Society of Ottawa.
- Powell, James (2022). Lord Elgin's Visit to Bytown and the Reminiscences of Mary Anne By Friel. Ottawa: Historical Society of Ottawa.
- Pritchard, Trevor (2020). "RTG 'Misrepresented' its Ability to Build Light Rail, City Says". CBC.
- Purdy, Sean (1998). "Building Homes, Building Citizens: Housing Reform and Nation Formation in Canada, 1900-20". Canadian Historical Review. 79 (3): 492–523. doi:10.3138/CHR.79.3.492. ISSN 0008-3755.
- Rayburn, Alan (2001). Naming Canada: Stories About Canadian Place Names. Toronto; Buffalo: University of Toronto Press. ISBN 0-8020-4725-4.
- Reevely, David (2002). "'Buses, Trains Don't Belong in Ravines': Ex-Toronto mayor critical of Ottawa Transit System". Ottawa Citizen. pp. 29, 35 – via ProQuest.
- Rogers, Allyson; Franklin, Gale (2025). "Petro-Masculine Soundscapes: Music, Sound, and Violence at the 2022 Ottawa 'Freedom Convoy'". Transposition. 13. doi:10.4000/15b06. ISSN 2110-6134.
- Rosenfeld, Raymond A.; Reese, Laura A. (2003). "The Anatomy of an Amalgamation: The Case of Ottawa". State and Local Government Review. 35 (1): 57–69. doi:10.1177/0160323X0303500106. ISSN 0160-323X.
- Ruprecht, Alvina (1997). "Suddenly this summer...: A Review of Theatre in Ottawa, Summer 1997". Canadian Theatre Review. 93: 75–76. ISSN 0315-0836.
- Rutherford, Scott (2020). Canada's Other Red Scare: Indigenous Protest and Colonial Encounters during the Global Sixties. Montreal: McGill-Queen's University Press. ISBN 978-0-2280-0511-7.
- Shorter, G. W. (1962). Ottawa-Hull Fire of 1900 (Report). Ottawa: National Research Council of Canada. doi:10.4224/40001342.
- Stettner, Sharon (2016). "A Brief History of Abortion in Canada". In Stettner, Sharon (ed.). Without Apology: Writings on Abortion in Canada. Edmonton: AU Press. pp. 31–76. ISBN 978-1-77199-160-5. OCLC 947134037.
- Struthers, James (2025). "Charlotte Whitton". The Canadian Encyclopedia.
- Surtees, R. (1983). Indian Land Surrenders in Ontario, 1763-1867 (PDF) (Report). Ottawa: Government of Canada. April 10, 2026.
- Swayze, Ken; McGhee, Robert (2011). "The Heritage Hills Site and Early Postglacial Occupation of the Ottawa Valley". Archaeology of Eastern North America. 39. Eastern States Archeological Federation: 131–152. ISSN 0360-1021. JSTOR 23265118.
- Sweeny, Alastair (2022). Thomas Mackay: The Laird of Rideau Hall and the Founding of Ottawa. Ottawa: University of Ottawa Press. ISBN 978-0-7766-3679-5.
- Tam, Pauline (1994a). "Two Festivals Fall Short of Attendance Goals". The Ottawa Citizen. p. 15 – via ProQuest.
- Tam, Pauline (1994b). "Valdy, Wiffen headline Ottawa Folk Festival". The Ottawa Citizen. p. 50 – via ProQuest.
- Taylor, John H. (1986). Ottawa: An Illustrated History. Toronto: Lorimer & Company. ISBN 0-88862-981-8.
- Taylor, John H. (1989). "City Form and Capital Culture: Remaking Ottawa". Planning Perspectives. 4 (1): 79–105. doi:10.1080/02665438908725673. ISSN 0266-5433.
- Taylor, John (2000). "Ottawa: Canada's Evolving Capital". Historian. 66: 17–21.
- Vance, Michael Easton (2012). Imperial Immigrants: Scottish Settlers in the Upper Ottawa Valley, 1815-1840. Toronto: Dundurn Press. ISBN 978-1-55488-756-9.
- Urrutia, Deborah; Manetti, Elisa; Williamson, Megan; Lequy, Emeline (July 3, 2021). "Overview of Canada's Answer to the COVID-19 Pandemic's First Wave (January–April 2020)". International Journal of Environmental Research and Public Health. 18 (13). doi:10.3390/ijerph18137131. ISSN 1660-4601. PMC 8297373. PMID 34281075.
- Van der Veen, Katharine (2018). Protests and Affordable Housing Policy Delayed: Urban Renewal and the Demolition of LeBreton Flats. Ottawa: Historical Society of Ottawa. ISBN 978-0-920960-49-3.
- Ward, John T. (2020). "Territorial Ties to the Algonquin Homeland". Global Encyclopedia of Territorial Rights. Springer. doi:10.1007/978-3-319-68846-6_548-1.
- West, Leah; Nesbitt, Michael; Norris, Jake (2022). "Invoking the Emergencies Act in Response to the Truckers' 'Freedom Convoy 2022': What the Act Requires, How the Government Justified the Invocation, and Whether It Was Lawful". Criminal Law Quarterly. 70 (2): 262–291.
- Wheeler, Carolynne; Adam, Mohammed (2001). "Future of O-train 'A Real Gamble'". Ottawa Citizen. p. 17 – via ProQuest.
- White-Crummey, Arthur (2025). "25 Years After Ottawa's Amalgamation, Is There Any Going Back?". CBC.
- Witgen, Michael (2007). "The Rituals of Possession: Native Identity and the Invention of Empire in Seventeenth-Century Western North America". Ethnohistory. 54 (4): 639–668. doi:10.1215/00141801-2007-025. ISSN 0014-1801.
- Wylie, William N. T. (1983). "Poverty, Distress, and Disease: Labour and the Construction of the Rideau Canal, 1826-32". Labour / Le Travail. 11: 7–29. ISSN 1911-4842.
