= Donna Dawson =

Canadian novelist

Donna D. Dawson
- Born: Donna Fawcett; 1964 (age 61–62); Canada
- Occupations: Novelist, writing instructor

Donna D. Dawson (née Donna Fawcett, c. 1964) is a Canadian novelist and writing instructor. She has published Christian-themed suspense and speculative fiction. Her works have appeared under both Donna D. Dawson and her legal name, Donna Fawcett.

== Career ==
Dawson's published novels include Vengeance, The Adam & Eve Project, Redeemed, Fires of Fury, and Rescued. She has also contributed the short story "One True Friend" to the anthology Hot Apple Cider. Dawson teaches creative writing in Ontario. In 2011, Janet Sketchley described Dawson's novel Rescued as an informative and thought-provoking work that balances human-interest storytelling with suspense fiction. Dawson’s novel Vengeance (2008) received coverage in multiple Ontario newspapers. In the Waterloo Region Record, journalist Jon Fear reviewed the novel as part of a feature on regional fiction, writing that it “has a plot that’s the equal of those in bestselling thrillers,” while noting that its overtly Christian characters and themes distinguished it from mainstream suspense fiction. Vengeance was also reviewed in the Guelph Mercury. In an article for Word Guild, writer Steph Beth Nickel profiled Dawson’s career, faith-based themes, and work as a novelist and writing instructor.

== Selected works ==
As per OCLC WorldCat. Typically her fiction is published under the name Donna Dawson while non-fiction is published under the name Donna Fawcett.

=== Fiction ===
- The Adam & Eve Project (2006)
- Redeemed (2006)
- Vengeance (2008)
- Fires of Fury (2009)
- Rescued (2010)

=== Non-fiction ===
- Thriving in the Home School (2006)
- Duke the Chihuahua Writes: A Tutorial for Beginning Writers (2012)
