= 224th Battalion, CEF =

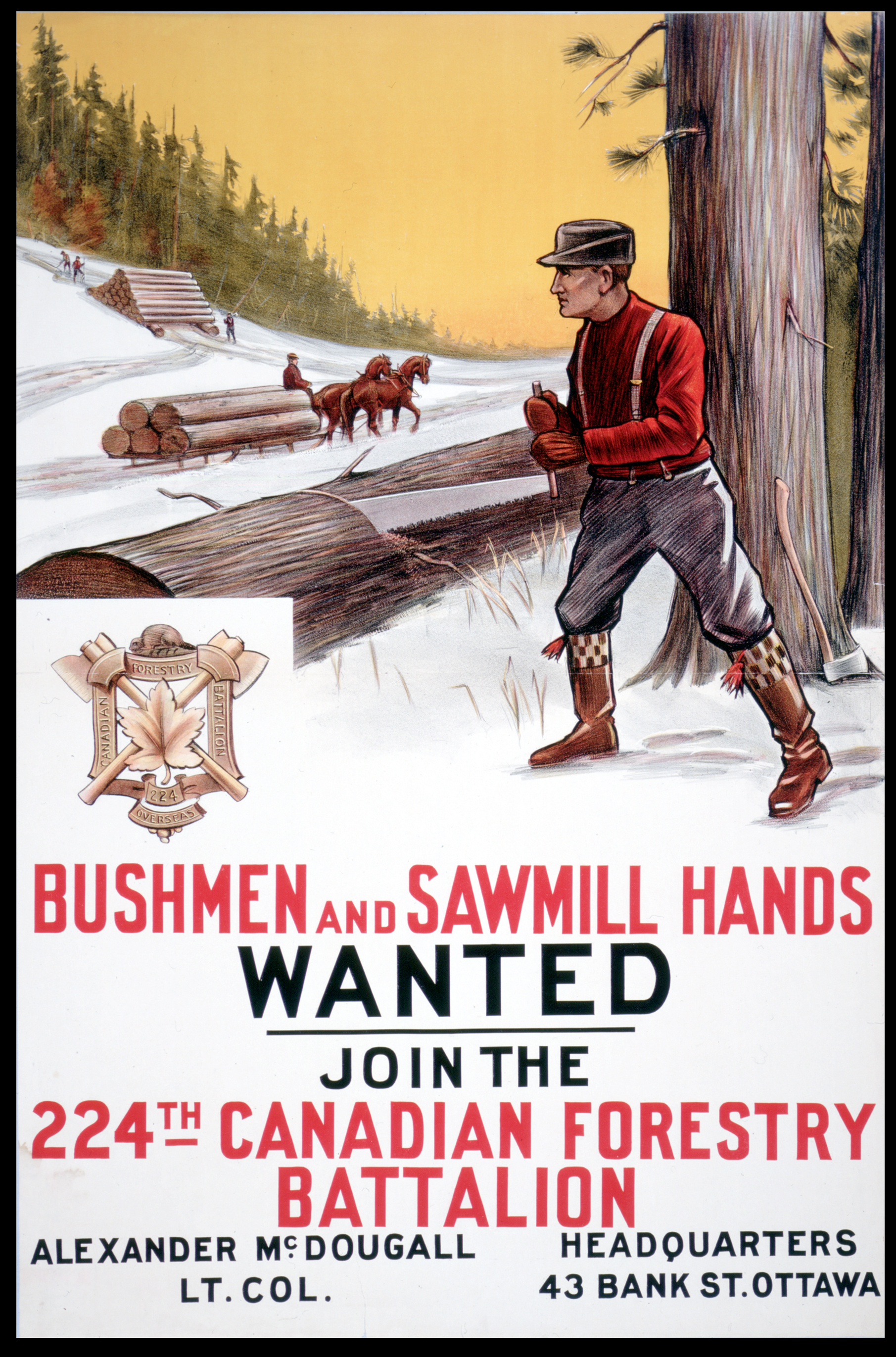
“Bushmen and sawmill hands wanted” war poster created in [1915] from the Archives of Ontario poster collection.

The 224th Battalion, CEF was a unit in the Canadian Expeditionary Force during the First World War.

== History ==
Based in Ottawa, Ontario, the unit began recruiting in early 1916 in that city and surrounding district. The battalion was created to recruit men with forestry skills. They were going to serve France and Britain. A six-week recruitment took place and over 1,600 men joined the battalion. They did tasks such as site clearing, building railroad components, and collecting lumber for building purposes. After sailing to England in May 1916, the battalion became the 224th Forestry Battalion. The 224th Battalion, CEF had one Officer Commanding: Lieut-Col. A McDougall.
