= Jon Fear =

Jon Fear is a Canadian journalist, editor, and local historian best known for his work with the Waterloo Region Record.

== Career ==
Fear worked as a journalist and copy editor at the Waterloo Region Record, where he was a newsroom colleague of other staff writers and contributed to news, feature, and heritage-related content. His work included engaging with municipal officials on public-interest topics, such as environmental sustainability and waste reduction. He has also written for the national newspaper The Globe and Mail.

Fear became particularly associated with local history through his role as a writer of the weekly heritage column Flash from the Past, which invited readers to identify and share memories connected to historical photographs from the newspaper's archives. His work in this area led members of the public to seek him out for assistance in identifying historical materials and photographs. Fear also authored features within the Flash from the Past series that documented demolished buildings and vanished landmarks in downtown Kitchener, including a nostalgic feature on the Mayfair Hotel published in 2011. Flash from the Past debuted in 2006 and became a popular weekly feature of the Waterloo Region Record, drawing on archival photographs and reader responses to reconstruct the region's social and architectural history. Fear was one of the column's principal writers during its early years and is regularly cited as a previous author of the feature. The series became notable for its collaborative approach, incorporating reader-submitted memories and photographs, a phenomenon that Fear later reflected on in print.

In 2018, Fear co-authored the book Flash from the Past with Chris Masterman. The volume, published by Biblioasis, collected selected columns from the newspaper series and expanded the project beyond the Record's archives to include materials from other local collections. Fear and Masterman publicly launched the book at TheMuseum in Kitchener, where they appeared as the credited authors.

Fear's contributions to local historical research and journalism have also been acknowledged in published works outside the Waterloo Region Record; for example, in the introduction to the book Kitchener: An Illustrated History (1983), Canadian politician and historian John English, writing with Kenneth McLaughlin, credited the newspaper and its staff for their assistance, stating: “we owe the Record and its staff, especially Jon Fear, a great debt.”

== See also ==
- History of Ontario
- Waterloo, Ontario
