= Leamy =

Leamy may refer to:

== People with the surname ==
- Andrew Leamy, a Quebec industrialist
- Denis Leamy
- Edmund Leamy
- Elisabeth Leamy - television journalist, author and speaker, best known for her on-air work as Consumer Correspondent for ABC's Good Morning America.
- John Leamy (hurler)
- John Leamy (merchant) (1757–1839), American trader with Spanish colonies
- Robin Leamy (bishop) (born 1934), New Zealand Roman Catholic bishop
- Robin Leamy (swimmer) (born 1961), American former swimmer
- James Patrick Leamy

== Other ==
- Leamy Lake in Gatineau, Quebec
  - Casino du Lac-Leamy, a casino situated on the lake

== See also ==
- Robert Leamy Meade
