= The Girly Ghosthunters =

- Genre: Paranormal television
- Starring: Dana Matthews; Corrie Matthews; Jen Kieswetter; Nicole Dobie
- Country of origin: Canada
- No. of seasons: 1
- No. of episodes: 13

Original release
- Network: CTV Sci-Fi Channel
- Release: January 14 – April 15, 2005

The Girly Ghosthunters is a 30-minute Canadian paranormal TV series. It was first broadcast on Friday, January 14, 2005, on the Canadian SPACE speciality channel. The thirteenth and last episode was broadcast April 15, 2005.

The show featured four women visiting alleged haunted locations in the province of Ontario. To visit these locations, they used a motorhome with the Girly Ghosthunters logo on the sides, driven by a character named Schultzy. They used modern ghost hunting equipment, in an attempt to document any ghosts, apparitions or other phenomena in the visited locations. Before doing so, they interviewed a few people at each locale to understand the history of the building and hear how the place was haunted. After the investigation was over, viewers are shown any evidence of paranormal activity collected from the chosen location. "YOU DECIDE" (this is the preamble for each group of evidence at the end of each episode) for yourself whether it is true or an elaborate hoax. The show was produced by Buck Productions, Inc.

== The Girly Ghosthunters and mascot ==
Dana Matthews
The "spiritualist." Her favourite ghost detection tool was by using dowsing rods.
Corrie Matthews
The "scientist." She was the one to question and debunk the girls discoveries. Her favourite tool was the digital camera. Corrie and Dana are also sisters.
Jen Kieswetter
The "researcher." She was the main person responsible for gathering any information about the places they were going to investigate. Her favourite tool was the digital audio recorder.
Nicole Dobie
The "adventurer." Her favourite tool was the specialized pendulum that looked like the Foucault pendulum. Accompanied with the pendulum was a board that lets a spirit answer any question by directing the pendulum to the choices of a yes, no, or maybe answer.
Gnomie
The Girly Ghosthunters' mascot. It was a typical garden gnome.

== Equipment used ==
- A Ouija board - used in Episodes 1, 6, 7, 9 and 13.
- An infrared camera - used very briefly in Episode 5 and in very short intermission spurts within an episode.
- An EMF detector - used in Episodes 3, 5, 9 and 11.

== Episodes ==
- Episode 01: 2005.Jan.14 - The Grand Theatre in London.
- Episode 02: 2005.Jan.21 - Fort George in Niagara-on-the-Lake.
- Episode 03: 2005.Jan.28 - The Nicholas Street Gaol in Ottawa, now known as the Ottawa Jail Hostel.
- Episode 04: 2005.Feb.04 - The Bytown Museum in Ottawa.
- Episode 05: 2005.Feb.11 - The Masil Farmhouse (a private residence on an acreage) near Ajax.
- Episode 06: 2005.Feb.18 - The Battle of Lundy's Lane site at the Drummond Hill Cemetery in Niagara Falls.
- Episode 07: 2005.Feb.25 - Banting House Inn (a bed and breakfast lodge) in Toronto.
- Episode 08: 2005.Mar.04 - The Werx (a bar) in Hamilton.
- Episode 09: 2005.Mar.11 - The Cherry Hill House (an Italian restaurant) in Mississauga.
- Episode 10: 2005.Mar.18 - Fort Henry in Kingston.
- Episode 11: 2005.Apr.01 - The Angel Inn in Niagara-on-the-Lake.
- Episode 12: 2005.Apr.08 - Cedar Island: A campground that is only accessible by boat. It is also part of the Thousand Islands National Park near Kingston.
- Episode 13: 2005.Apr.15 - The Hermitage in Ancaster.
