= Étienne Brûlé Park =

Park in Toronto, Ontario, Canada

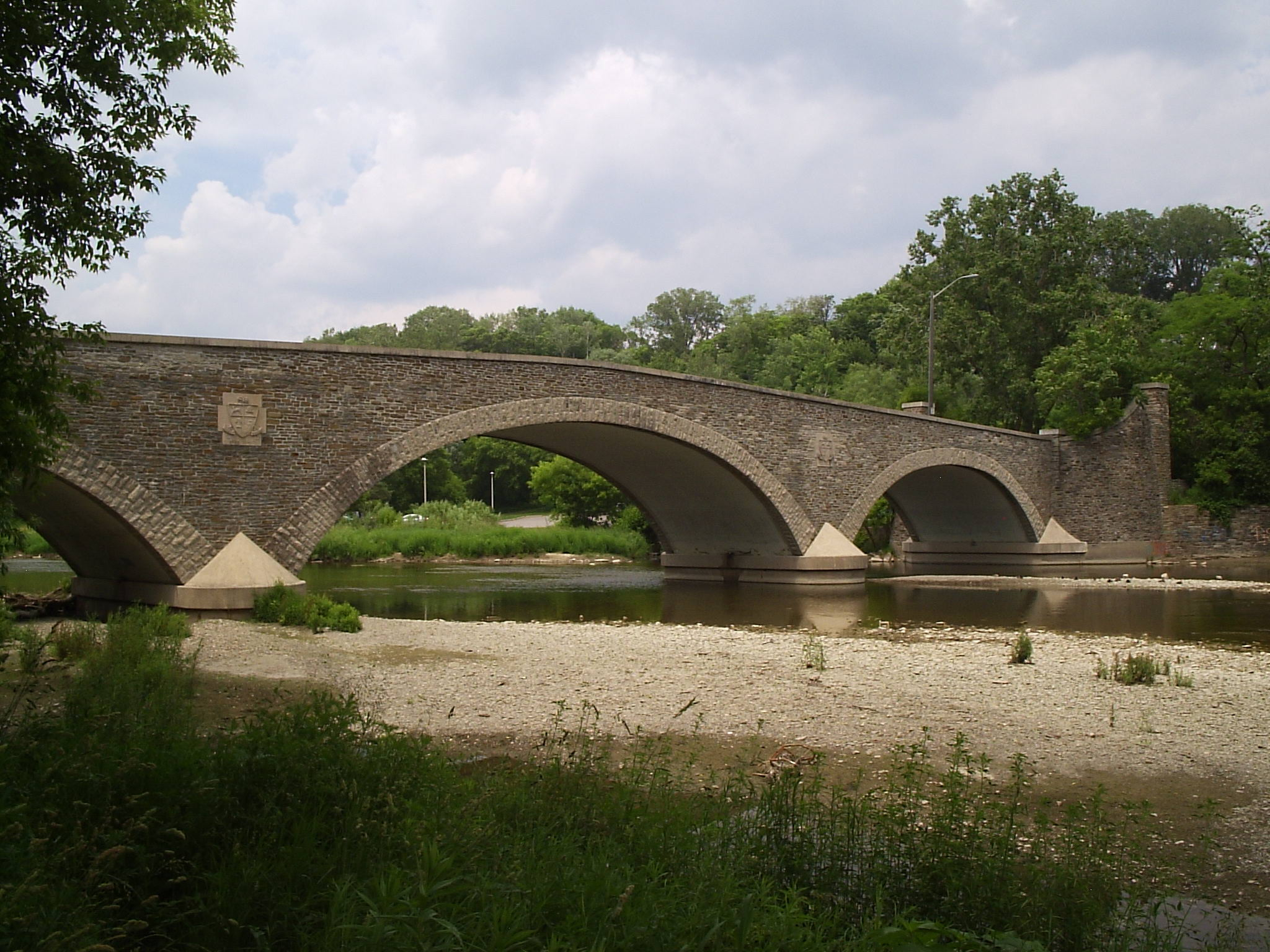
- Old Mill Road bridge over the Humber River

- Location within Toronto
- Type: Public Park
- Location: Toronto, Ontario, Canada
- Coordinates: 43°39′10″N 79°29′40″W
- Operator: Toronto Parks
- Public transit: Old Mill station
- Website: Etienne Brule [sic] Park

Étienne Brûlé Park is located in the Humber River valley just north of Bloor Street West in Toronto, Ontario, Canada. It is named after Étienne Brûlé, an early French explorer in the Toronto area. It is believed that Étienne Brûlé was the first European to see Lake Ontario in 1615, from a high point of land beside the Humber.

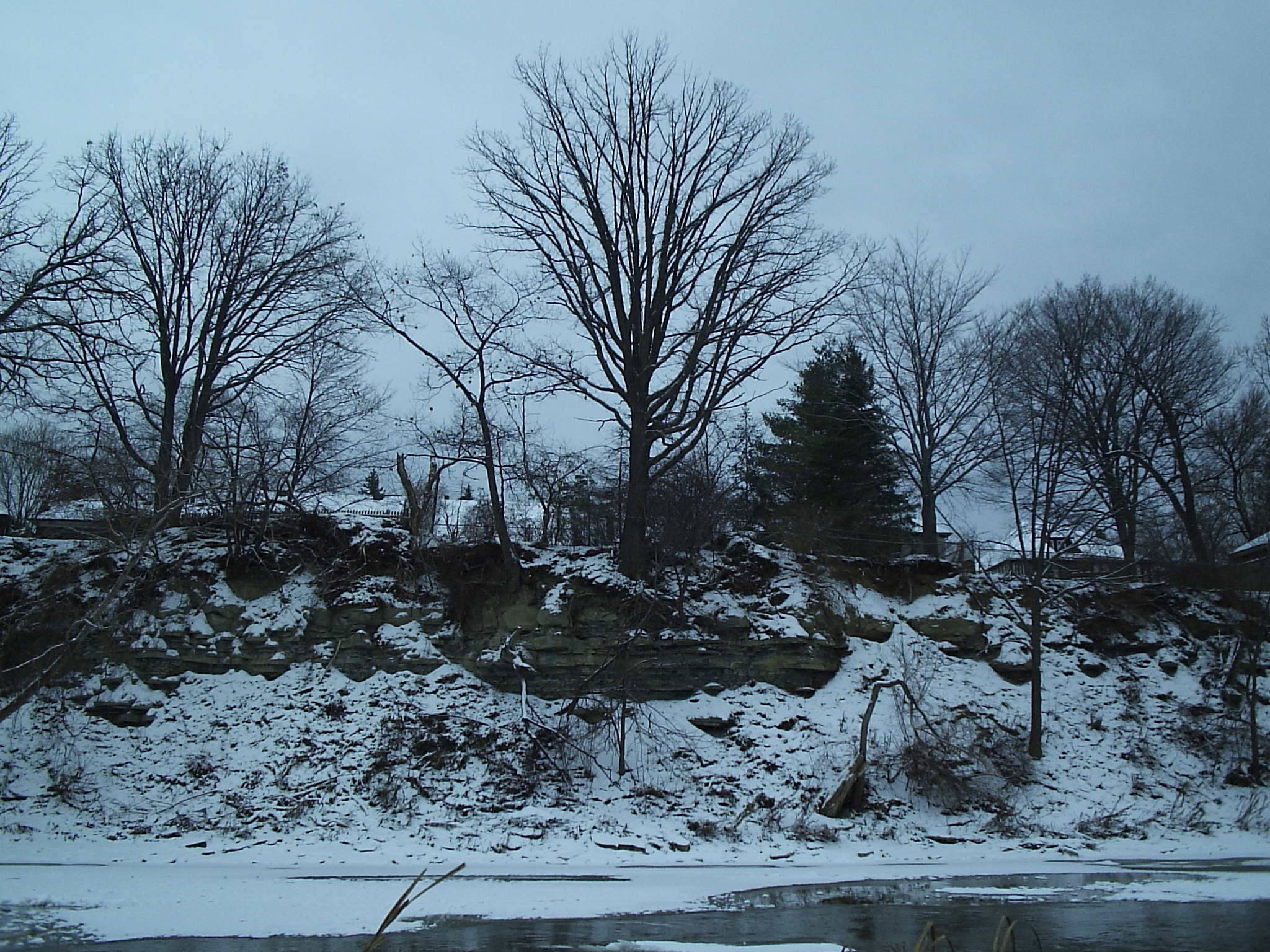
Étienne Brûlé Park in winter.

== Characteristic features ==
The Old Mill and The Old Mill Bridge - Mills have existed at this site since 1793 when King's Mill, Toronto's first industrial building, supplied wood for the construction of Fort York (1793), shipbuilding and for early Toronto (York). A bridge has stood over the Humber River at this location since 1837. The present arched stone bridge was built in 1916. Both the mill and the bridge are historically significant and have been designated under the Ontario Heritage Act.

=== Fishing at the park ===
Significant improvements are being made to the health of this fishery based on the Humber River Fisheries Management Plan.

- One of the projects is to improve fish movement in the watershed. Many of the dams from the Old Mill to Palgrave in the Town of Caledon have already been modified to enhance fish migration and the access to 70 kilometres (43 mi) of fish habitat that has been disconnected from Lake Ontario for over 150 years. The Humber River watershed covers 903 square kilometres (349 mi^{2}). There are over 50 kilometres (31 mi) of paved bike trails.
- Other initiatives to help protect fish during the sensitive life cycle periods and to promote angling opportunities are also underway.

== Entrances and public transit ==
Étienne Brûlé Park can be entered at the south from Old Mill Road or at the north from Lundy Avenue. The park is only five minutes walk from Old Mill subway station. Pedestrians and cyclists can also travel through the park on the Tommy Thompson Trail, using entrances at Pasadena Gardens and Lundy Avenue. The Tommy Thompson Trail connects King's Mill Park to Lambton Woods. During the winter months, the parks also allow cross-country skiing.
