= Étienne Brûlé =

French explorer of Canada (c.1592 - c.1633)

- Born: c. 1592; Paris, France
- Died: c. 1633 (aged 40–41); Toanche, New France
- Occupations: Fur trader, explorer

Étienne Brûlé (French pronunciation: [etjɛn bʁyle]; c. 1592 – c. June 1633) was the first European explorer to journey beyond the St. Lawrence River into what is now known as Canada. He spent much of his early adult life among the Wendat (Huron), and mastered their language and learned their culture. Brûlé became an interpreter and guide for Samuel de Champlain, who later sent Brûlé on a number of exploratory missions, among which he is thought to have preceded Champlain to the Great Lakes, reuniting with him upon Champlain's first arrival at Lake Huron. Among his many travels were explorations of Georgian Bay and Lake Huron, as well as the Humber and Ottawa Rivers. Champlain agreed to send Brûlé, at his own request, as an interpreter to live among the Onontchataron, an Algonquin people, in 1610. In 1629, during the Anglo-French War, he escaped after being captured by the Seneca tribe. A source claims that Brûlé was killed and eaten by the Wendat Bear tribe, who believed he had betrayed them to the Seneca.

== Early life in France ==
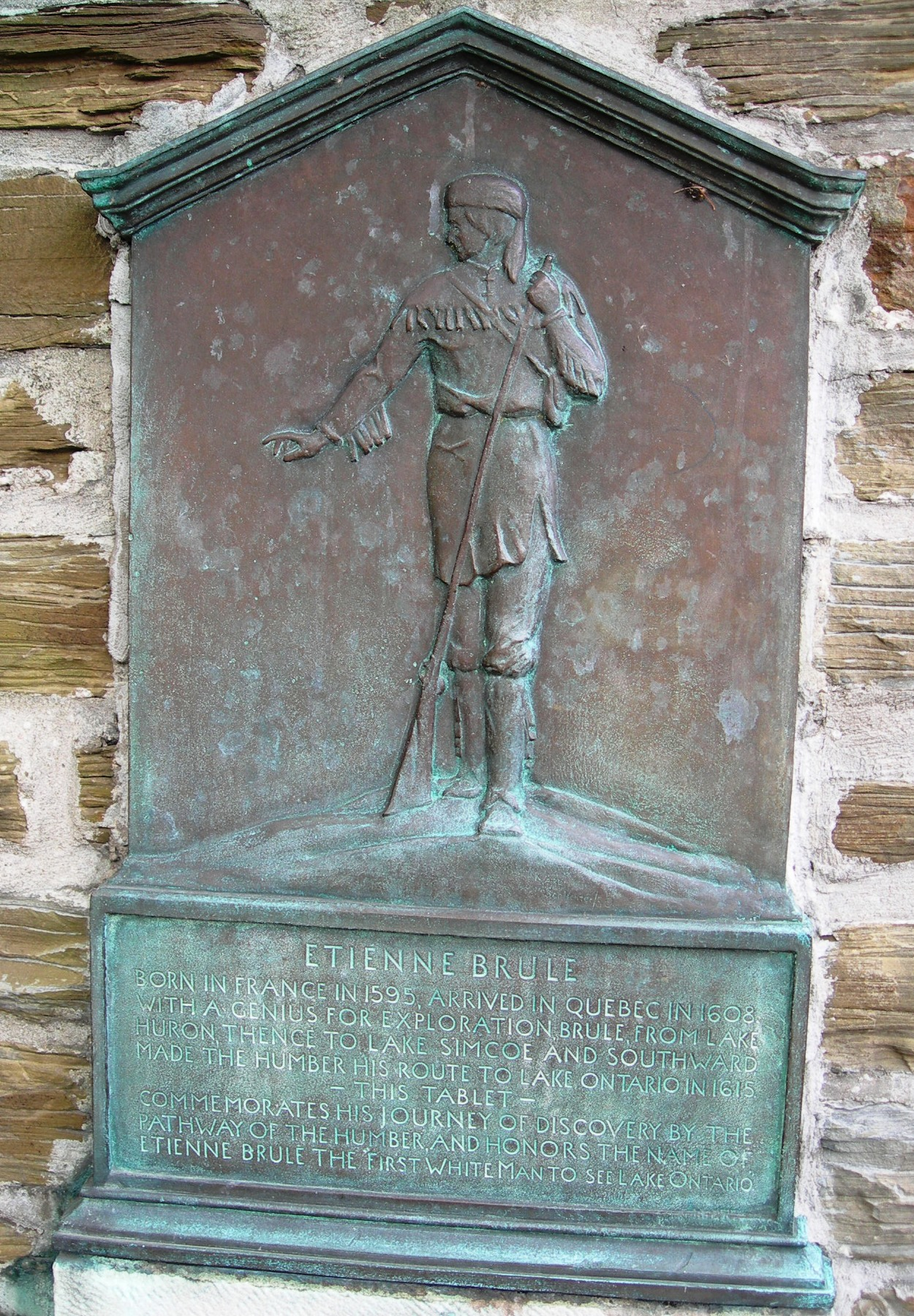
A plaque to commemorate Étienne Brûlé's discovery of the pathway to the Humber in Etienne Brule Park of Toronto, Ontario, puts his date of birth at 1595.

Brûlé, the son of Spire Bruslé and Marguerite Guérin, was born c. 1592 in Champigny-sur-Marne southeast of Paris. Brûlé's exact date of birth is unknown since the Champigny-sur-Marne parish registers for 1590–1600 have been lost. He came to Canada in 1608 when he was 16 years old. Brûlé has not left any recollection or description of his early life, his time among the Indigenous peoples, or of his explorations. His life, therefore, has only been viewed through the works of others, including Champlain, Gabriel Sagard, and Jean de Brébeuf.

== Life in New France ==
Champlain wrote of a youth who had been living in New France since 1608, and whom many believe to have been young Brûlé. In June 1608, Brûlé told Champlain that he wished to go and live with the Algonquins, learn their language, and better understand their customs and habits. Champlain arranged for him to do so and in return, the chief Iroquet (an Algonquin leader of the Petite nation who wintered his people near Huronia), requested that Champlain take Savignon, a young Wendat, with him to teach him the customs and habits of the French. Champlain instructed Brûlé to learn the Wendat (Huron) language, explore the country, establish good relations with the First Nations, and report back in one year's time. On 13 June 1611, Champlain returned to visit Brûlé, who astonishingly had done all that Champlain had asked of him. Brûlé now dressed like an Indigenous person and was extremely pleased with the way he was treated and all that he had learned. Champlain requested that Brûlé continue to live among the Indigenous peoples so that he could fully master everything, and Brûlé agreed.

For four years, Champlain had had no connection or communication with Brûlé who, it is thought, was then the first European to see the Great Lakes. In 1615, they met again at Huronia. There, Brûlé informed Champlain of his adventures and explorations through North America. Brûlé explained that he was joined by another French interpreter by the name of Grenolle. He reported that they had traveled along the north shore of what they called la mer douce (the freshwater sea), now known as Lake Huron, and went as far as the great rapids of Sault Ste. Marie where Lake Superior enters Lake Huron.

In 1615, Brûlé asked permission from Champlain to join 12 Wendat warriors on their mission to see a nation referred to as Carantouan (who may or may not have been the Andaste Susquehannock people), allies of the Wendat, to ask them for their support during an expedition Champlain was planning. Champlain ordered the party to travel west of the Seneca country because they needed to arrive there quickly and the only way to do so was by crossing over enemy territory. This proved dangerous, but Brûlé did reach Carantouan; however, he arrived at the meeting place Champlain chose two days too late to assist Champlain and the Wendat, who had been defeated by the Iroquois.

Brûlé probably visited four of the five Great Lakes — Lake Huron, Lake Superior, Lake Erie, Lake Ontario—and may have also seen Lake Michigan. Brûlé was more than likely the first European to complete these expeditions across North America. In these expeditions he visited places such as the Ottawa River, Mattawa River, Lake Nipissing, and the French River to Georgian Bay. From Georgian Bay, Brûlé was able to cut into Lake Huron. He paddled up the St. Marys River and portaged into Lake Superior. He journeyed through Lake Simcoe and portaged through what is now Toronto to Lake Ontario. From Lake Ontario Brûlé was able to travel in Upstate New York and explore Pennsylvania and cross down the Susquehanna River to Chesapeake Bay. It is also said that it is very probable that Brûlé was one of the first Europeans to stand along the shores of Lake Erie and Lake Michigan. He had spent months visiting indigenous peoples that lived along Lake Erie between the Niagara and Detroit Rivers, but because he left no writings of his own, almost nothing identifiable is known about the tribes he visited, many of which would be obliterated a few decades later in the Beaver Wars (in contrast, Joseph de La Roche Daillon, who conducted a missionary journey among the tribes of Western New York in 1627, kept meticulous notes of his journeys; it is de La Roche's writings that serve as the primary history of pre-Beaver Wars native occupation of Western New York).

Champlain and the Jesuits often spoke out against Brûlé's adoption of Wendat customs, as well as his association with the fur traders, who were beyond the control of the colonial government. Brûlé returned to Quebec in 1618, but Champlain advised him to continue his explorations among the Wendat. Brûlé was later confined in Quebec for a year, where he taught the Jesuits Wendat. In 1626 Brûlé returned to France, where he worked as a merchant, and in 1626 or 1627 he married Alizon Coiffier. In April 1628, Brûlé and his French fleet were captured by the British off Anticosti Island and Brûlé was brought to London before being released and returned to New France where, "pledging support to the Kirkes, he resumed his life among the Wendat and his trading activities."

In 1629, Brûlé betrayed the colony of New France. David Kirke and his brothers, English merchants of Huguenot extraction, paid 100 pistoles to Brûlé and three of his companions to pilot their ships up the St. Lawrence River and "undoubtedly gave information as to the desperate state of Quebec's garrison" that emboldened the Kirkes to attack it. In his last accounts, Samuel Champlain "accused Brûlé of treason because the latter agreed to do business with the Kirke brothers when they took Quebec for England in 1629." After 1629, Brûlé continued to live with the Indigenous peoples, acting as an interpreter in their dealings with the French traders.

== Death ==
In 1633, Brûlé died at Toanché, on the Penetanguishene peninsula, however the actual events surrounding his death remain unclear. The rumours of his death first reached Quebec through second and third party accounts largely by the Algonquins, who at the time, were believed to be in a trading dispute with the Wendat.

One theory is that he was captured by the Seneca Iroquois in battle. Though he managed to escape, when he returned to his home among the Wendat, they did not believe his story. Suspecting him of trading with the Senecas, they stabbed Brûlé to death—his body dismembered and eaten by the villagers. However, contrary to this theory, there is no ethnographic evidence that the Wendat practiced cannibalism. Additionally, Jean de Brébeuf, who arrived in the region shortly after Brûlé's death, described his murder as treacherous, but made no mention of cannibalism. One explanation is that the Wendat were misinterpreted—using the term eaten to describe that Brûlé was thrown from his high position. In this sense, eaten had previously been used by Wendat to describe deposed chieftains.

Brûlé's murder also appears to have been controversial among the Wendat. In the immediate aftermath of his death, Toanché was abandoned and subsequently Wenrio and Ihonatiria were founded—suggesting a schism formed in the clan between those who supported Brûlé's murder and those that didn't.

To further complicate the matter, Father Le Jeune wrote in his 1633 journal in Jesuit Relations that on the last day of June, 1633 he met a French Interpreter among an envoy of Wendat who had lived with them for many years. It is unknown whom else Le Jeune could be referring to other than Brûlé, despite reports that Brûlé was already dead.

== See also ==
- Timeline of Quebec history
- Timeline of Ottawa history
- Timeline of Toronto history
- Coureur des bois
- Samuel de Champlain
- École secondaire Étienne-Brûlé
- French colonization of the Americas
- Etienne Brûlé Park
- Surrender of Quebec
- Camp Brulé
