= Ottawa Jail Hostel =

Building in Ottawa, Ontario

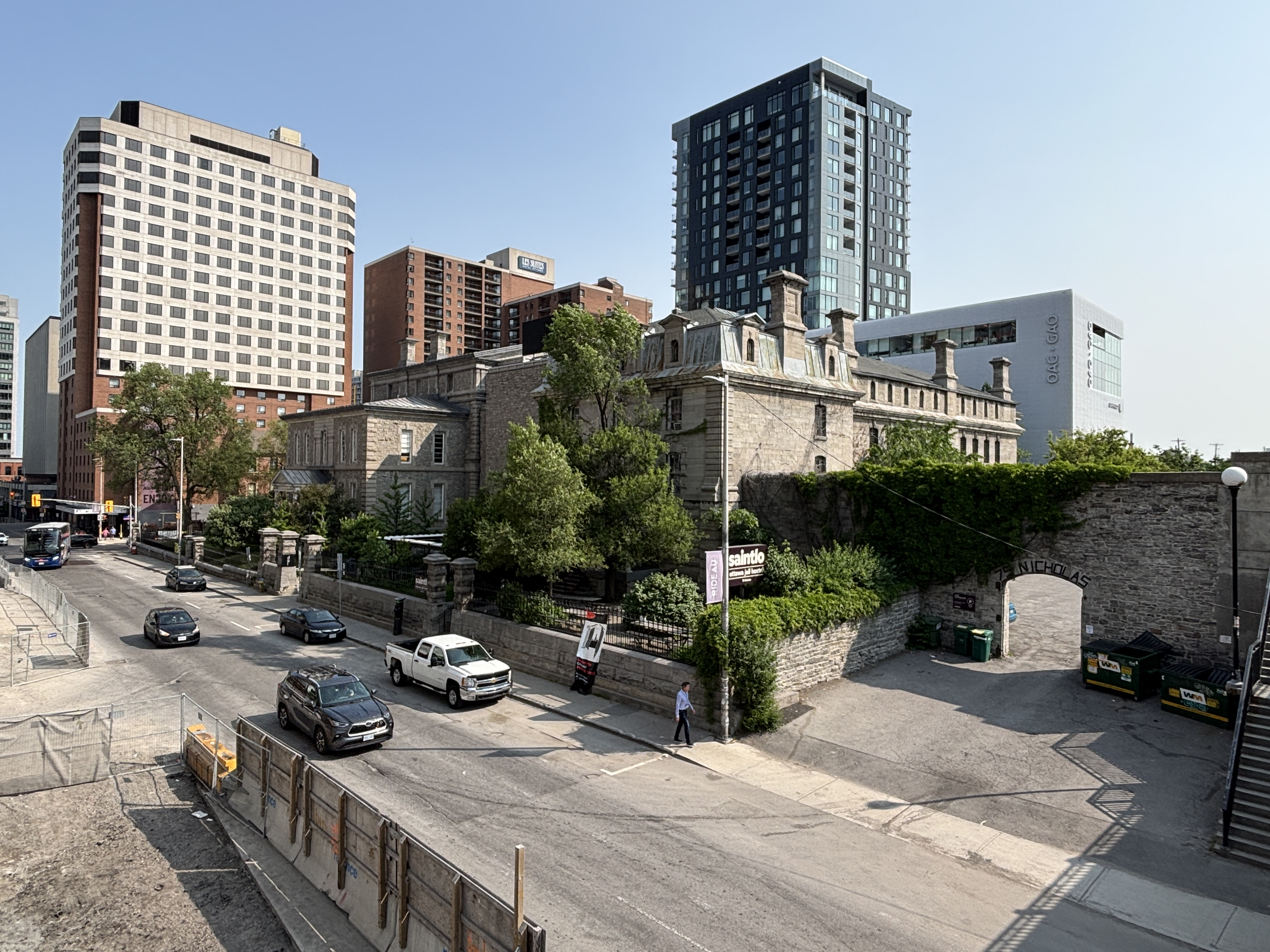
- Interactive map of the Ottawa Jail Hostel area

General information
- Location: 75 Nicholas Street; Ottawa, Ontario; K1N 7B9
- Coordinates: 45°25′29.46″N 75°41′20.40″W
- Opening: 1973
- Affiliation: Saintlo Hostels

Other information
- Number of bars: 1
- Parking: Yes

Website
- saintlo.ca/en/ottawa-jail/

The Ottawa Jail Hostel is a hostel operated by Saintlo Hostels and located at 75 Nicholas Street in Ottawa, Ontario, Canada. The hostel was originally the Carleton County Gaol (jail), more commonly known as the Nicholas Street Gaol or Ottawa Jail. When the jail closed in 1972, Hostelling International purchased and converted the building, but left much of the structure intact, allowing guests to experience spending a night "in jail". The top floor, which had served as the jail's death row, has been restored to much of its original condition and tours are conducted daily. The Ottawa Jail Hostel, ran by Saintlo Hostels decided to end the partnership with The Haunted Walk in order to focus those spaces on accommodations instead.

In 2009, the hostel's bar, Mugshots, was opened to the public. Mugshots then closed to the public in 2015. In July 2011, the courtyard space of the former jail was converted into an outdoor bar for the summer months.

== History ==
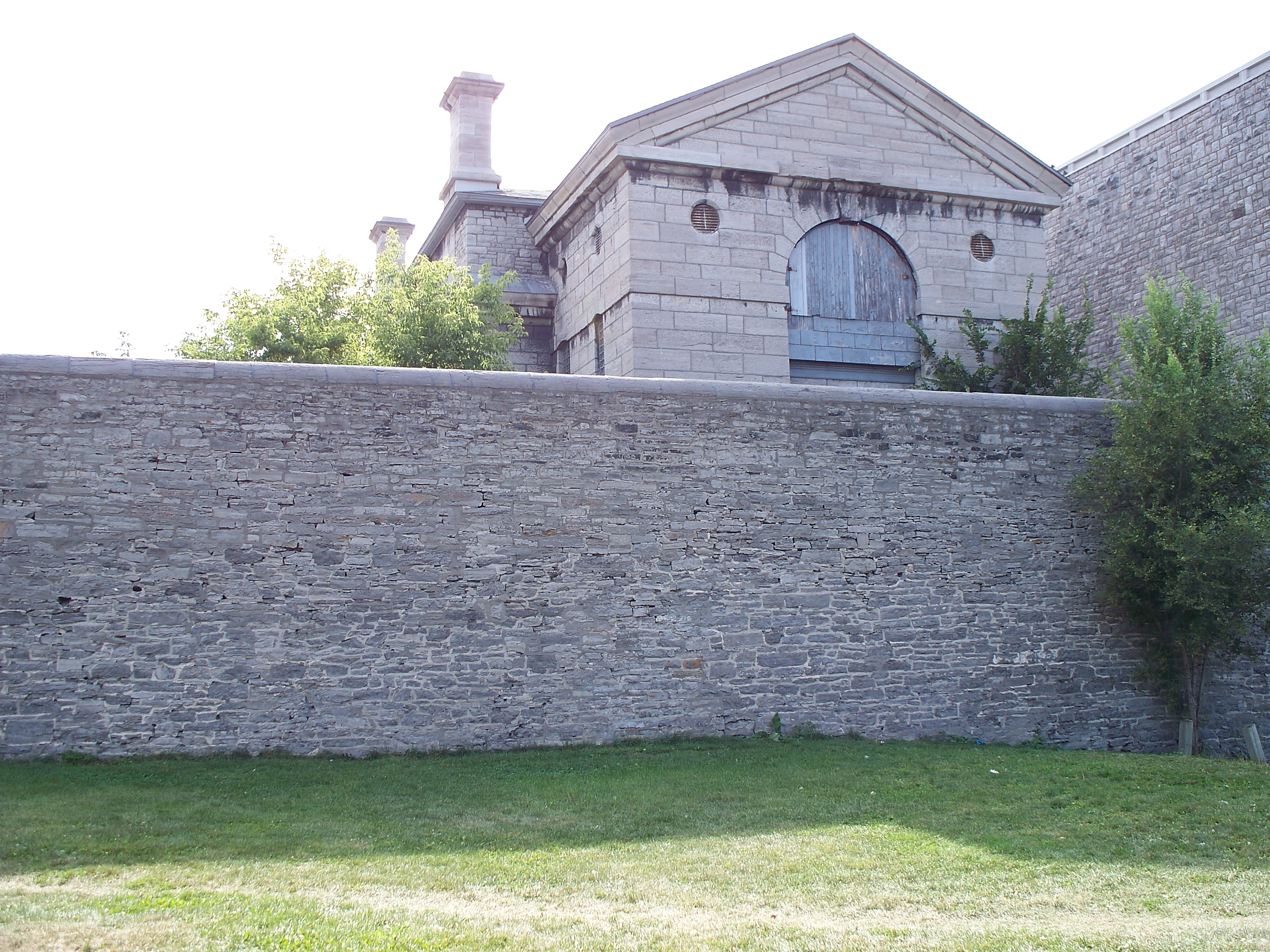
The gallows at the rear of the jail (doors closed), from a public spectator's point of view.

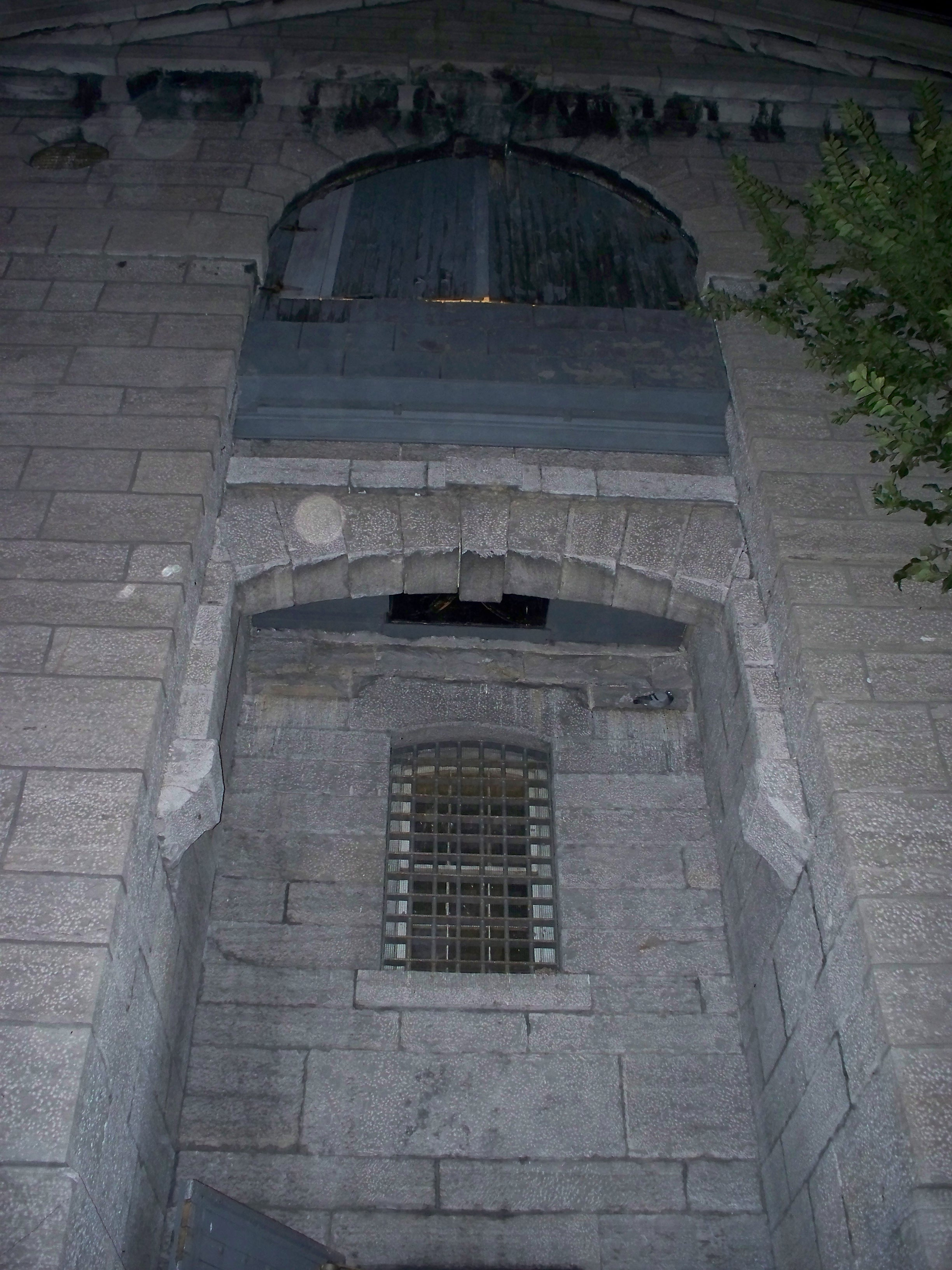
A view of the gallows (doors closed) from within the jail's exercise yard. Note the trap door above the window.

The Nicholas Street Gaol was the main jail of Ottawa for over a century. The structure was built in 1862 next door to the courthouse, and connected by a tunnel. Designed by Henry Horsey, the jail was the site of the hanging of Patrick J. Whelan on February 11, 1869, for the assassination of Thomas D'Arcy McGee. Over 5,000 people witnessed Whelan's hanging, which was a large number considering the size of Ottawa at the time. Staff and guests have reported that Whelan's spirit is one of many that haunts the hostel and will appear at the end of guests' beds or in his death-row cell. The third (official) and final execution at the jail took place on March 27, 1946, when Eugène Larment, who had killed an Ottawa police detective, was hanged. The building remained in use as a jail until 1972 when the outdated facility was closed. The original gallows, however, are intact and remain fully functional. While open, the jail inflicted very inhumane conditions upon those imprisoned there and modern day excavations of the property have revealed numerous unmarked graves. Up to 150 prisoners, consisting of men, women, and children, would be forced to share 60 small cells (1x3 meters) and 30 larger cells (2x3 meters); as well as six solitary confinement units. Inmates included murderers or those incarcerated for minor infractions such as drunk and disorderly conduct.

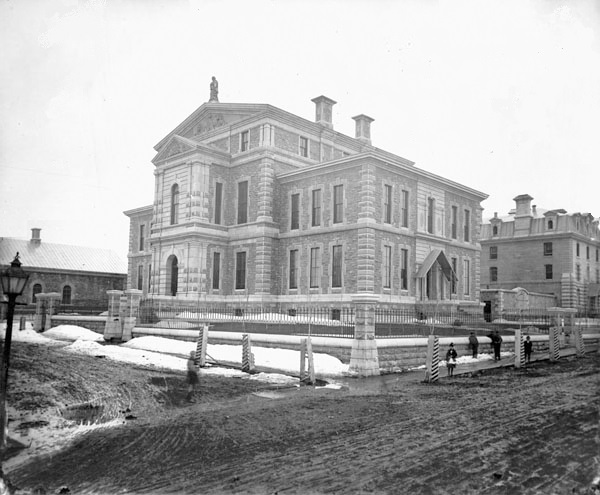
Foreground and Gaol, background, ca. 1875

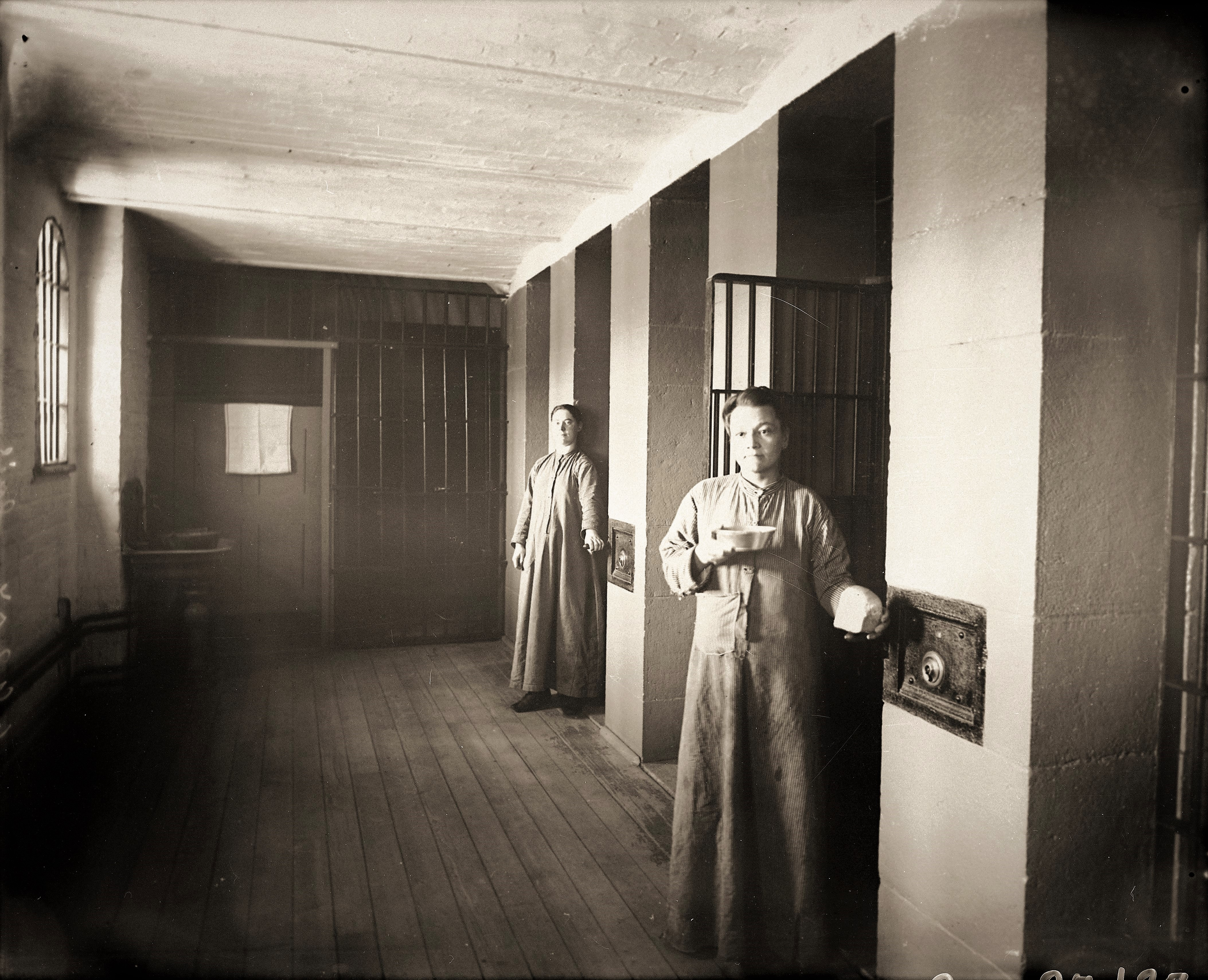
Female inmates in front of their cells, 1895

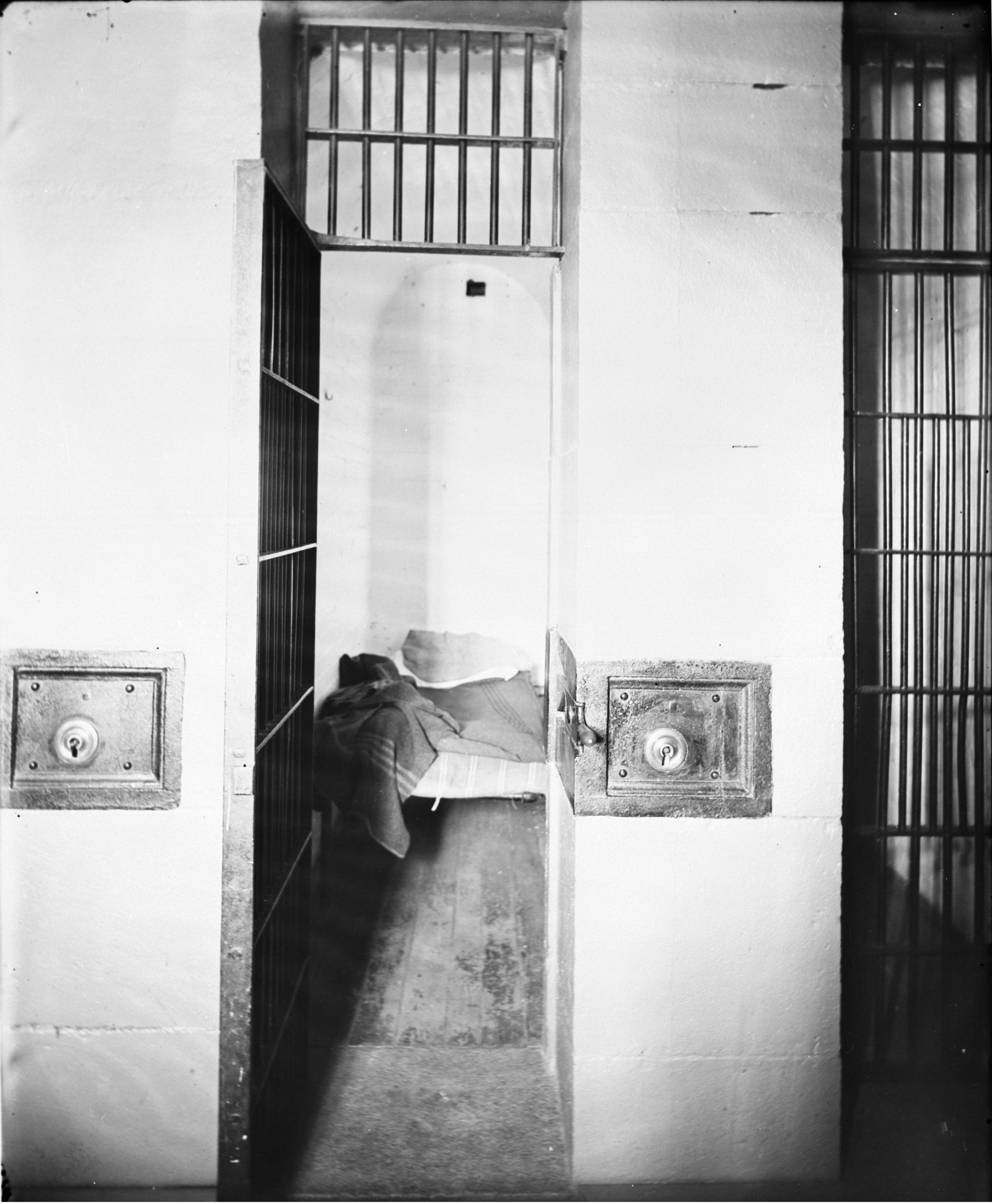
Prison cell, 1895

== Gallery ==
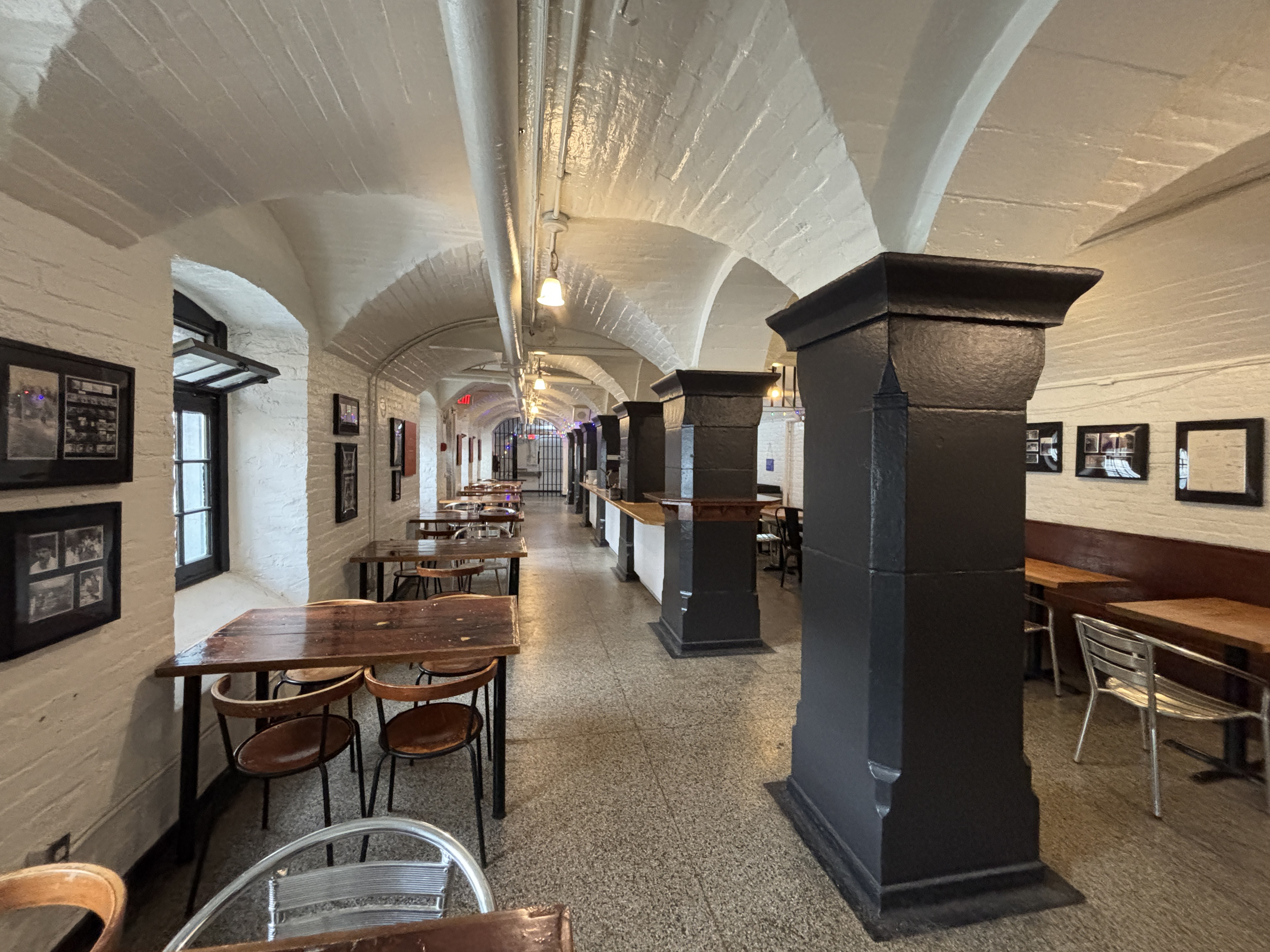
Lounge in Level 2

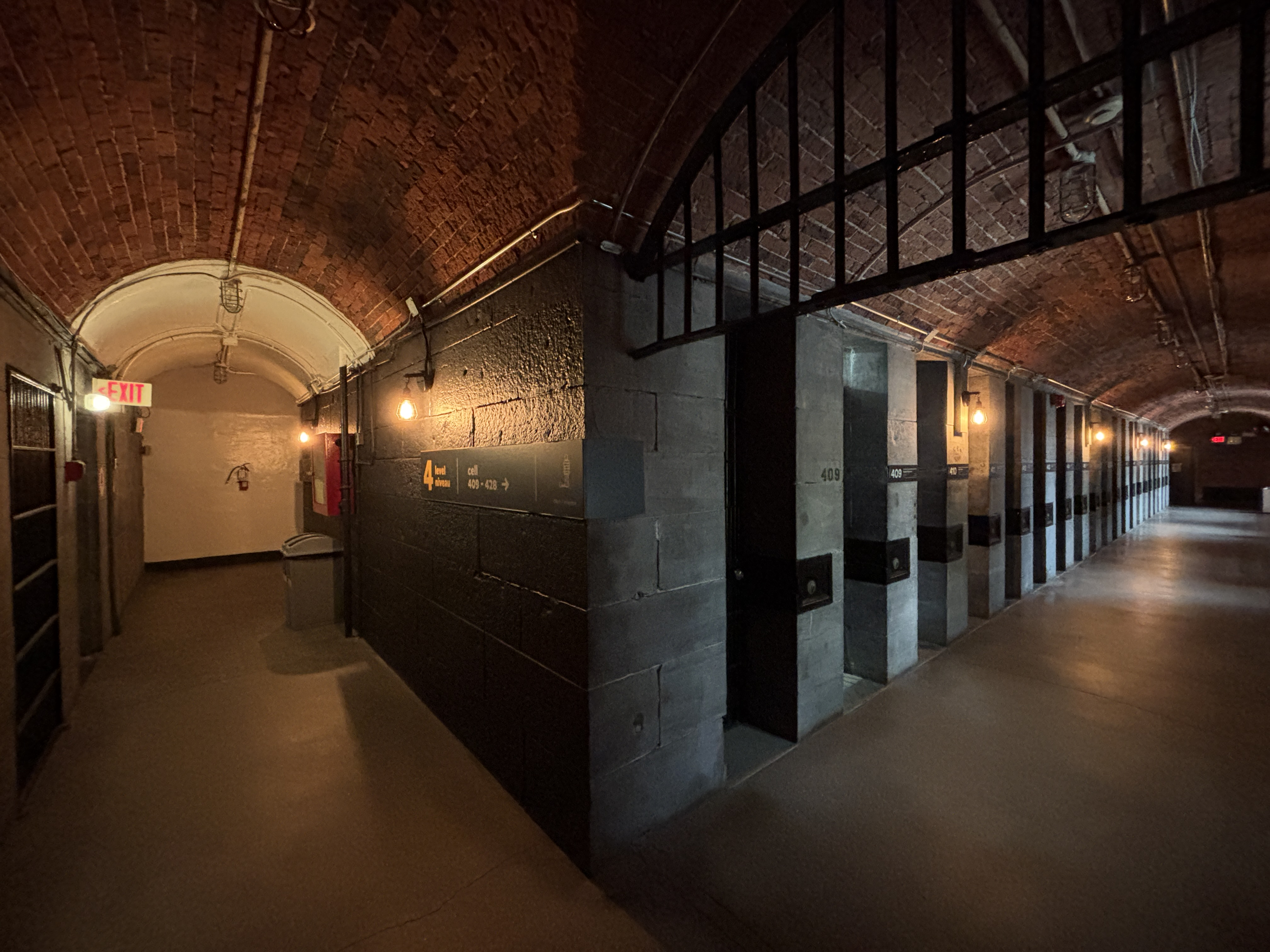
Jail in Level 4

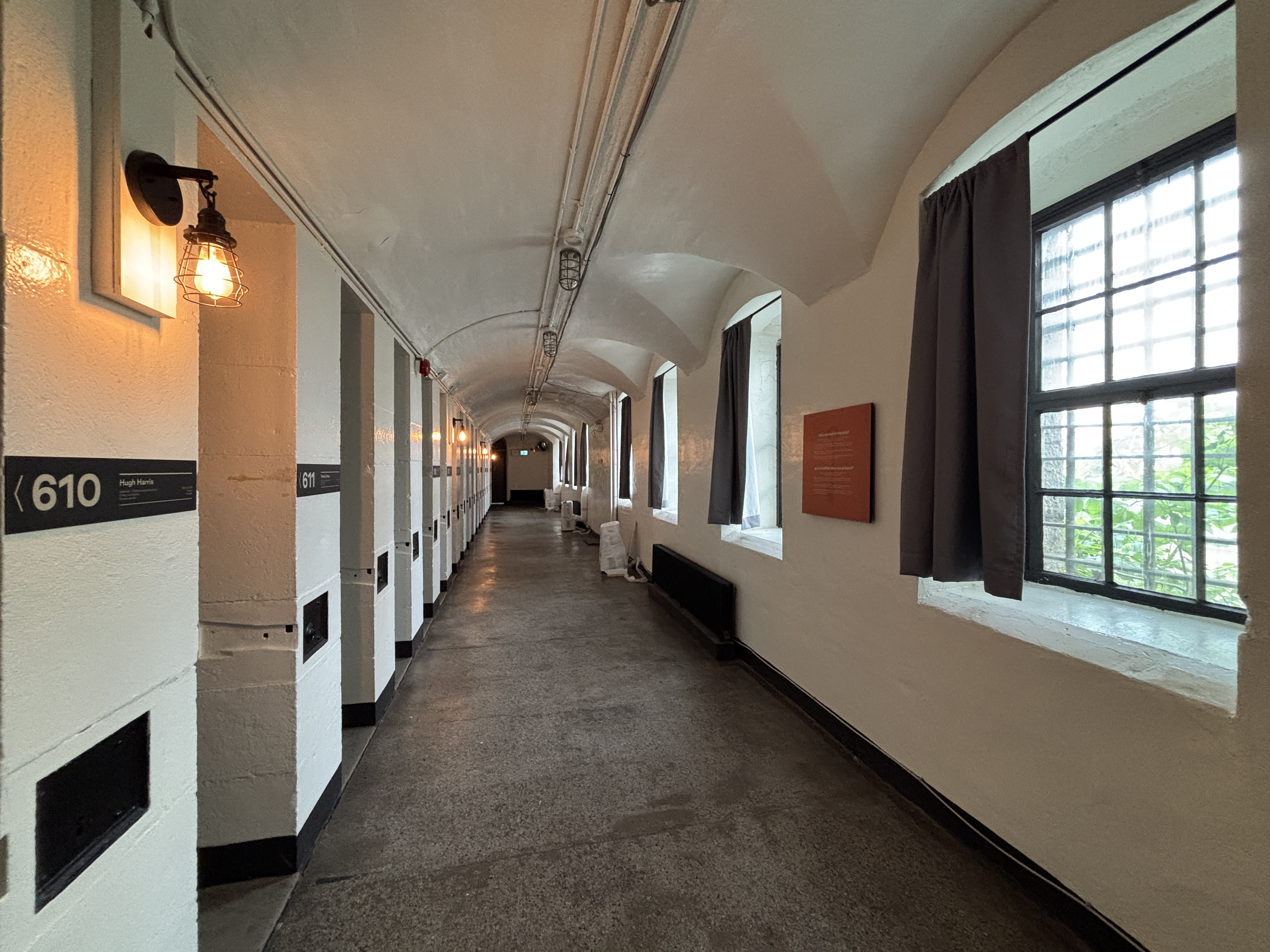
Jail in Level 6

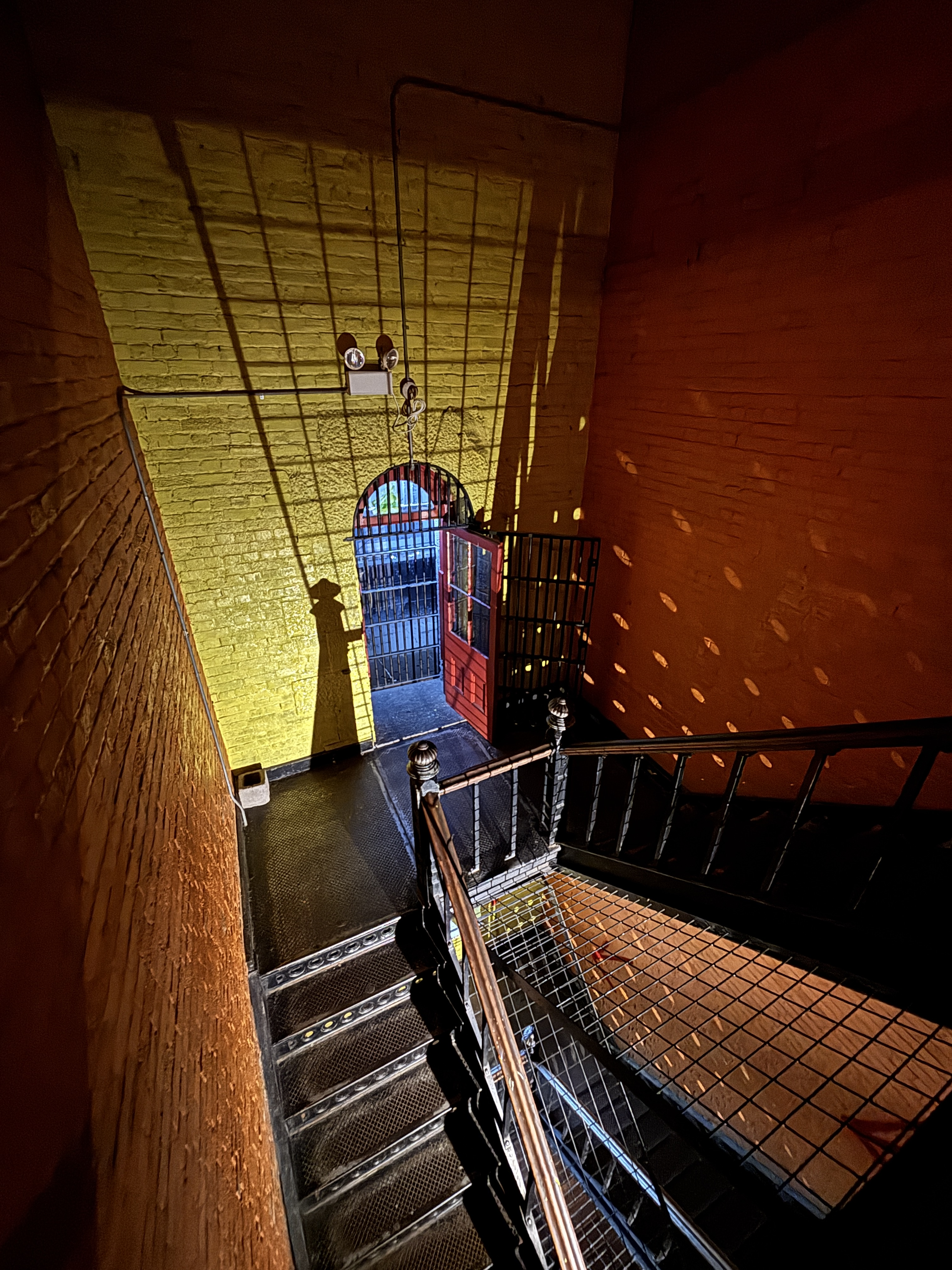
back stairs

== Television ==
The hostel was featured in the third episode of the Canadian television show The Girly Ghosthunters that aired on Space in 2005. It was also featured on the second episode of the Canadian television show Mystery Hunters in 2002.

== See also ==
- List of designated heritage properties in Ottawa
