= Patrick J. Whelan =

Irish-Canadian assassin

Patrick James Whelan
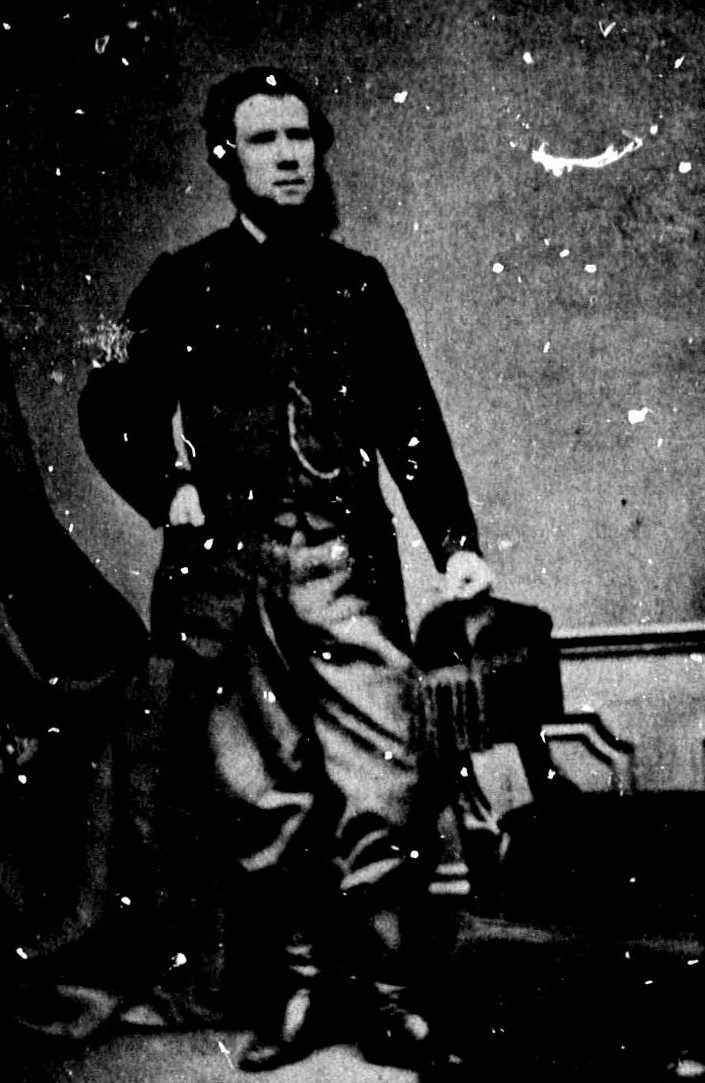
- Born: Patrick James Whelan c. 1840; Galway, Ireland
- Died: 11 February 1869 (aged 28–29); Carleton County Gaol, Ottawa, Ontario, Canada
- Cause of death: Hanging
- Other names: Sullivan, Smith (alleged)
- Occupation: Tailor
- Children
- Military Service
- Allegiance: Canada
- Branch: Canadian Militia
- Service years: 1866
- Rank: Sergeant
- Unit: Quebec Volunteer Cavalry
- Conflicts: Fenian Raids
- Motive: Fenian sympathy
- Criminal charge: Murder

Patrick James Whelan (c. 1840 – 11 February 1869) was an Irish-born tailor and suspected Fenian supporter who was executed after the assassination of Irish-Canadian journalist and politician Thomas D'Arcy McGee in Canada in 1868. He maintained his innocence throughout the proceedings. Questions about his guilt continue to be voiced, as his trial was "marred" by political interference, dubious legal procedures, allegations of bribing witnesses and easily discredited testimony.

== Life ==
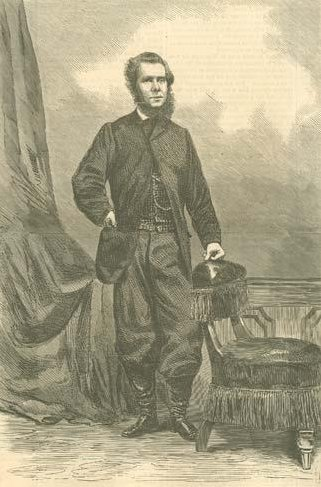
Engraving of Whelan's photograph

Whelan was born c. 1840 in County Galway, a younger son of William Whelan and Mary Sullivan of Galway. He became apprenticed to a tailor at the age of 14. Meanwhile, his brother John was alleged to have committed arson against a Royal Irish Constabulary barracks in the Dublin suburb of Tallaght. Whelan then led a "wandering life" travelling around England, before moving to Canada in approximately 1865. In Quebec City he worked as a tailor. There he joined the Volunteer Cavalry to defend the Province against the Fenian raids; however, some of his actions led to a military review on suspicions his sympathies lay instead with Irish republicanism. He was arrested, but eventually released without court martial proceedings.

He is believed to have moved between Buffalo, New York and Hamilton, Ontario and finally Montreal, Quebec for a year before marrying Bridget Boyle in 1867. Boyle, who was thirty years older than Whelan, was an upper-class woman and later the couple settled down with Whelan working as a merchant tailor in Ottawa. On 31 December 1867, two men including one identifying himself as "Smith, of the Grand Trunk" went to the home of McGee where they were welcomed into the library of the house by McGee's brother. One of the visitors, commonly believed to be Whelan, told McGee that he had come to warn the family that renegades were plotting to burn down the house at 4 am the following morning. He was thanked for the information, which seemed credible given the animosity against McGee, and given a note to take to the police station relating the known information about the alleged arson attempt and requesting two officers be sent to the house for protection. However, Whelan did not deliver the note to police until 4:45 am the following morning, after the supposed arsonist had failed to arrive. On 17 March 1868, Whelan acted as the Assistant Marshal of the St. Patrick's Day Parade in Ottawa.

== Killing of Thomas D'Arcy McGee ==
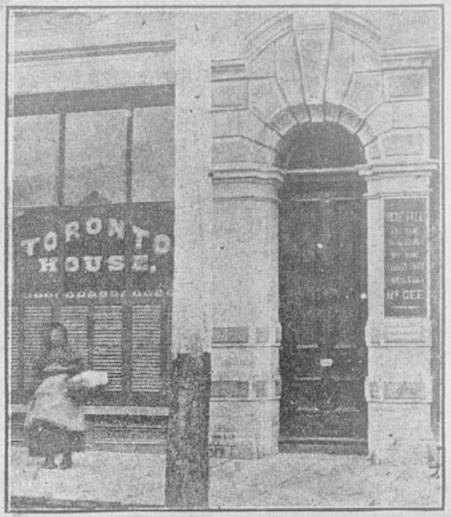
The site of McGee's killing

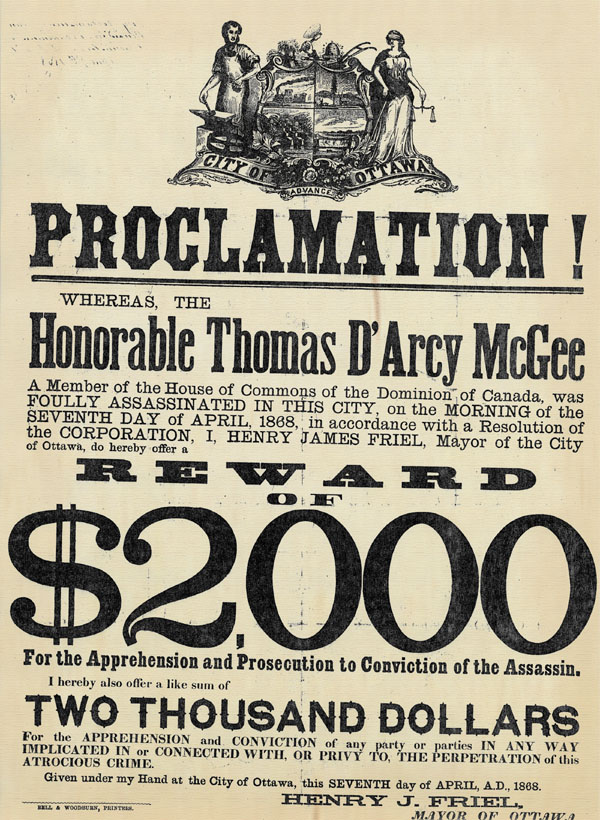
'`Poster advertising a reward for the killer's capture

McGee was returning to his boarding house on Sparks Street in the early morning hours of 7 April 1868. Smoking a cigar and fumbling with his key in the lock, he was greeted as the owner Mary Ann Trotter opened the door for him. At that moment, a muzzle flash erupted, and as a .32 calibre bullet tore through McGee's neck and through his jaw, knocking his dentures out, the politician fell back into the street.

By the next nightfall, more than 40 Canadians, predominantly Irish immigrants suspected of Fenian allegiance, had been arrested; most prominent of these was Patrick Buckley, who served as the stable hand to Prime Minister John A. Macdonald, and who gave police the name of Whelan.

Whelan, who had just left the house of Richard Quinn where he had mentioned that his boss Mr. Eagleson had been arrested for the murder, was found in a tavern belonging to Michael Starr at 9:30 pm. He was searched. A Sgt. Davis produced from Whelan's front right pocket a .32 Smith & Wesson pistol, serial #50847, with all six rounds still loaded. The other officers present took from his pocket a box of cartridges, some papers, the Irish American newspaper from a month earlier, a green silk badge of the Toronto Hibernian Benevolent Society, a membership card for the St. Patrick's Benevolence Society, a photograph of a lady, a ticket from the St. Patrick's Literary Society, two tickets the shamrock Quadrille Club inviting Whelan and a lady friend. By 9 April, the 28-year-old Whelan was considered the prime suspect and charged with the murder.

== Trial and execution ==
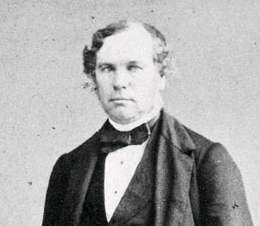
John Hillyard Cameron, Whelan's lawyer

Whelan found himself in a "bizarre" 8-day trial. The Prime Minister, a personal friend of McGee's, had received permission to sit beside judge William Buell Richards while hearing evidence. Ironically, Whelan was defended by Protestant Orangeman John Hillyard Cameron, while the prosecutor was Irish-Catholic James O'Reilly. The jurors at the trial were William Purdy, Matthew Heron, William Morgan, William Gamble, Thomas Weatherley, John Fecles, Benjamin Hodgins, John Wilson, Samuell Conn, Robert McDaniel, Robert W. Brown and George Cavanagh.

On his first day of trial, Whelan was noted as wearing an "irreproachable" black silk hat, black frock coat, white vest with narrow gold chain and black pants, and exhibiting a "jaunty" demeanor. He sat with folded arms, listening intently to the trial proceedings and eating apples. He was entranced by the flies walking on the ceiling of the courthouse, and laughed audibly when a constable lost his footing and slipped while trying to bring him out of the defendant's box. Agnes Macdonald wrote in her journal that he was a "small, mean-looking" man, who stroked his moustache nervously.

Eliza Tierney, a 14-year-old servant at Starr's tavern, was called as a witness and testified that she had known Whelan for six weeks as a boarder who lived in a room on the first floor of the tavern, and that he had owned a pistol for as long as she had known him. However, she discredited the police evidence suggesting that a shot had been recently fired from Whelan's gun, by offering that one of the other servant girls had handled the pistol clumsily only a week before and shot herself in the arm. This was also confirmed by bookkeeper William Goulden in his testimony, who added that Whelan had offered to sell his pistol just six weeks before McGee was killed. Other evidence suggested that Whelan owned the pistol as he was fond of sport shooting.

The prosecutor called Joseph Faulkner, a tailor who knew Whelan in Montreal, hoping that he would testify about Whelan's Fenian connections; while he said he recollected Whelan being angered by McGee during the election season, which was contradicted by other witnesses who claimed Whelan showed no interest in politics, he said there was no known Fenian connection. Another witness identified as Turner testified that he had heard a member of parliament mention that the government had offered one of Whelan's friends Doyle,Doyle $16,000 and passage to anywhere in the world to restart his life, if he would make a sworn statement against Whelan. However Susan Wheatley later testified that she had heard Turner say he would swear his grandfather's life away for $10,000 or $20,000 and no mention was made of Doyle. Later witnesses were actually directly asked to swear whether they had received any money for their testimony.

Now I am held to be a black assassin, and my blood runs cold. But I am innocent, I never took that man's blood.

— Whelan, on the final day of his trial.

There was much laughter in the courtroom when Cameron began questioning a witness demanding to know why "John Downey" had just answered that he had never known Whelan, nor lived in Montreal as it was widely known was true. The witness whispered to the judge, who informed counsel that the man called to the witness stand was named John O'Donnell, causing Cameron to mutter "Oh...then you may go down" and excusing him from the court while the actual John Downey was found and sworn in.

In his closing address, which lasted nearly three hours, Cameron noted that he did not believe any man had ever before been given a trial "under circumstances so unfairly arrayed in prejudice against him", and gave the example of several prominent legal cases where the defendant had been found guilty and executed, only to be exonerated later when the real culprit was found. When he resumed his seat, there was applause in the courtroom. When O'Reilly gave his closing address, he ended advising the jury "don't stretch your imaginations...don't trifle with your consciences or seek for doubts where there are none. Society looks to you for justice."

== Verdict, execution ==
Richards: The sentence of this court is that you, Patrick James Whelan, having been accused and found guilty of the murder of Thomas D'Arcy McGee, be taken from this place to the place from whence you came and be thence removed on Thursday, the tenth day of December, between the hours of nine in the morning and four in the afternoon, to the place of execution, and there be hanged by the neck until your body be dead, and may God have mercy on your soul.

Whelan: All that sentence, my Lord, cannot make me guilty.

— Exchange between Richards and Whelan at close of trial.

On 15 September, Whelan was found guilty and sentenced to hang by Richards. Upon hearing their verdict, Whelan advanced to the jury dock and said "I am held to be a murderer. I am here standing on the brink of my grave, and I wish to declare to you and to my God that I am innocent, that I never committed this deed".

Whelan appealed to the Court of Queen's Bench of Ontario; but Richards had just been named to that court, and thus cast the deciding vote not to overturn his own judgment. In January 1869, Whelan appealed to the Ontario Court of Appeal only to find Richards again sitting on the deliberating body and casting his vote to not overturn his conviction of Whelan. Whelan sent a letter to the Irish priest Dr. O'Connor on 1 February 1869 advising that it seemed his execution was imminent and he would request the priest's service and extreme unction on the scaffold.

He was publicly hanged in front of 5,000 spectators on 11 February 1869 at the Carleton County Gaol. He met his death "with manliness and faith", and told the gathered crowd that he was innocent, although he did know who had killed McGee. His last words were "God save Ireland and God save my soul".

== Legacy ==
Patrick James Whelan was apprehended, tried, and found guilty. He was probably only one out of a number of miscreants who conspired to commit the murder, but the whole truth respecting the dark affair has never been disclosed.

— Rene Doumic

Shortly after the debacle, the revolver Whelan was alleged to have used to murder McGee was lost. It surfaced as a family heirloom in the family of Scott Renwick in 1973, and 32 years later was offered at auction for $55,000. The gun was eventually bought at the auction for $105,000 by the Canadian Museum of Civilization (Now the Canadian Museum of History) and is now part of their collection.

Whelan's case is dramatised in Pierre Brault's 1999 play, Blood on the Moon. His solo performance was filmed for a one-hour special on Bravo television.
