= Victoria Tower (Canada) =

Former bell tower in Ottawa, Canada

Coordinates: 45.4249°N 75.6999°W

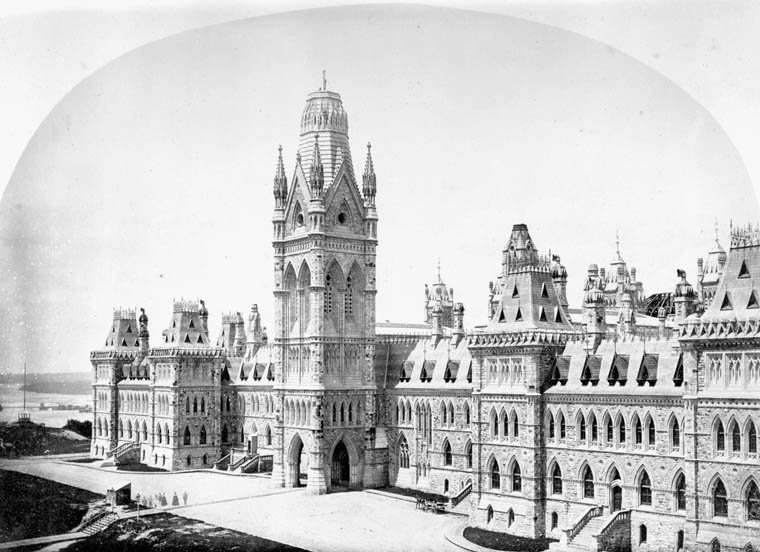
Original Canadian parliament buildings c. 1870, showing Victoria Tower

The Victoria Tower was the prominent main bell tower of the original Centre Block parliament building in Ottawa, Ontario, Canada. The 55-metre-high (180 ft) tower was the centre piece of Parliament Hill that was constructed from 1859 to 1866 by Thomas Fuller. It was destroyed during the great fire of the Centre Block on 3 February 1916. Its replacement, the Peace Tower, was built on the same location but the design (larger clock face, ornamental Victoria High Gothic vs. simpler Modern Gothic) and height were radically changed.

== Interior ==
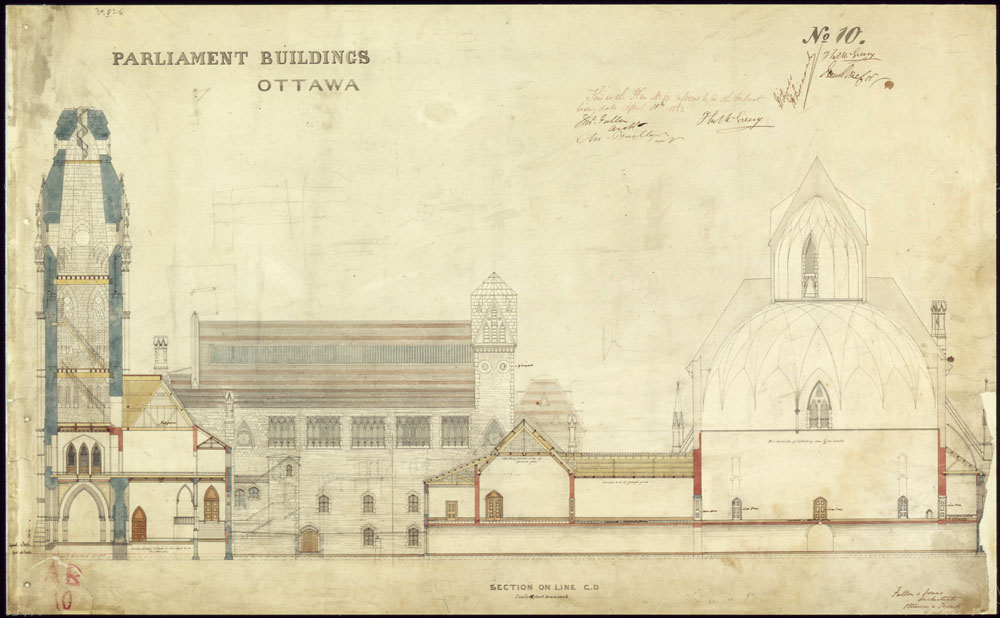
Section drawing of the Victoria Tower and original Centre Block

Inside the walls of the tower was a vacant space with a series of staircases leading to the bell tower. The upper section of the bell tower had a spiral staircase that lead to the spire outside and inside the support and actual bells. Access to the tower was from the second floor of the Centre Block as the ground floor was empty space that formed the opening and entrance to the Centre Block.

== Victoria Tower Bell ==
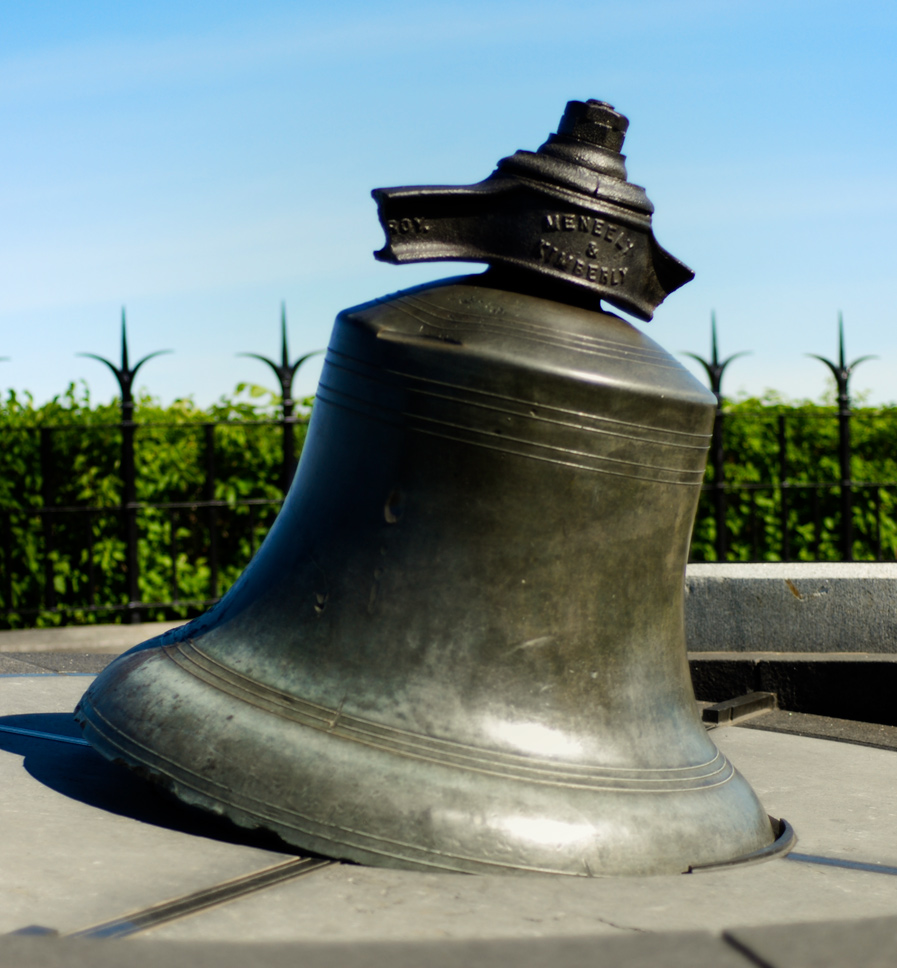
Damaged bell mounted on grounds of Parliament Hill

The Victoria Tower Bell is the only relic remaining from the Victoria Tower. It was cast in 1875 and installed in the tower in 1877. The bell fell from the tower during the Centre Block fire of 1916. The actual tower structure (outer walls) survived the fire, but the upper bell tower had collapsed on February 3 and was torn down during the reconstruction of the Centre Block.

The bell was restored in the year 2000, and placed on the grounds of Parliament Hill as a monument to the 1916 fire and to Canada's first Centre Block parliamentary building. It is showcased on a circular granite base, etched as the face of a clock, that represents its role in the keeping of time. The bell's inclined position recalls the angle at which it came to rest after falling during the fire of 1916.

== Sources ==
- Public Works and Government Services Canada
