= Lac Leamy =

Lake in Gatineau, Queebc, Canada

Leamy Lake
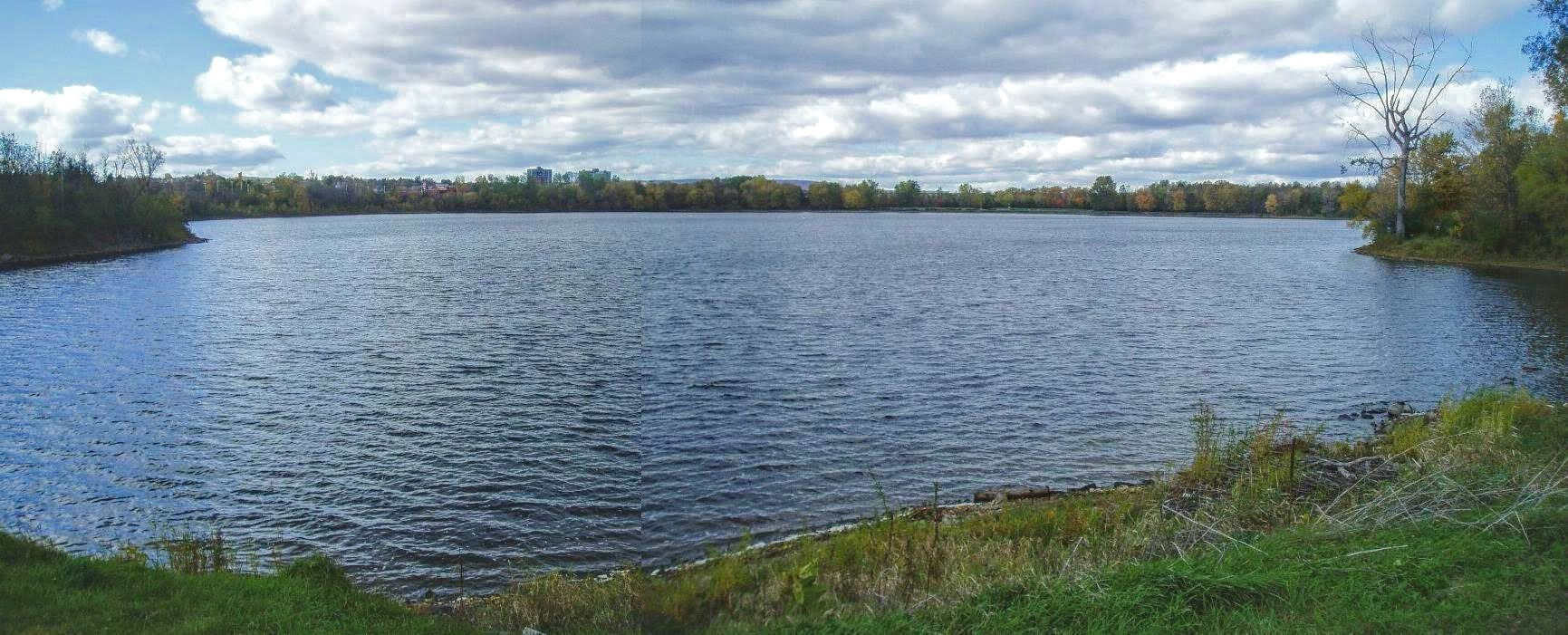
- looking west

- Location within Quebec
- Location: Gatineau, Quebec
- Coordinates: 45°27′05″N 75°43′20″W
- Primary inflows: Gatineau River
- Primary outflows: Ottawa River
- Basin countries: Canada
- Max. length: 0.75 km (0.47 mi)
- Max. width: 0.65 km (0.40 mi)
- Surface elevation: 48 m (157 ft)

Leamy Lake (in French: Lac Leamy) is a lake in the Hull sector of Gatineau, Quebec, Canada. The lake is located just to the south of the Gatineau River, and just west of the Ottawa River, and is linked to both of them with flowing in from the Gatineau and exiting to the Ottawa. To the south is the Lac de la Carrière, a former quarry that is now a lake that is also linked.

The lake is named after Andrew Leamy, an Irish settler in the region who operated a mill near the lake. He was married to Erexina Wright, the granddaughter of Hull's founder, Philemon Wright. The area became heavily industrialized in the nineteenth century. Much of the industry left the area after the Second World War and in the 1960s much of the area around the lake was turned into a large park. The beach on the lakeshore became a popular swimming location, however there were persistent problems with pollution, mainly flowing in from the Gatineau River. To solve this the inflow to the lake was blocked in the 1970s. This solved some of the problem. By the 1990s the Gatineau River had become much cleaner, and the stagnation of the lake was causing its own problems, the channel was thus reopened.

On the southern shore of the lake, between it and Lac de la Carrière, is the Casino du Lac-Leamy, one of the region's major tourist attractions.
