= Andrew Leamy =

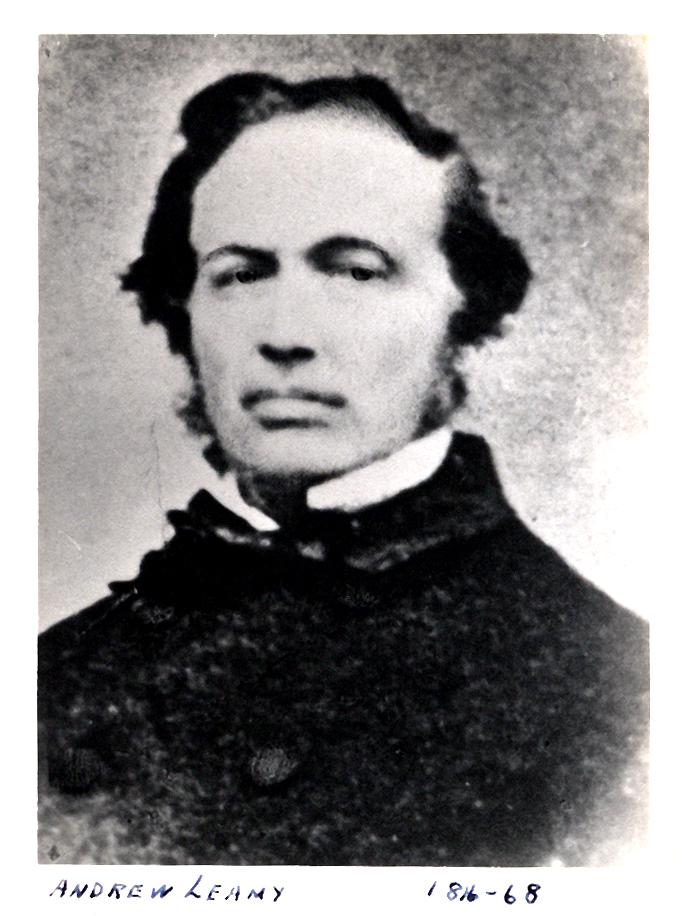
Andrew Leamy, pioneer industrialist.

Andrew Leamy (1816 in Drom, County Tipperary, Ireland – April 21, 1868 in Hull, Canada) was a pioneer industrialist and community leader in Wright's Town, Lower Canada, which became Hull, Quebec and is now incorporated into the City of Gatineau in the National Capital Region of Canada.

Andrew Leamy was the son of Michael Leamy and Margaret Marshall, who emigrated to Bytown with Andrew, his two brothers James (Bytown Council 1851, Centre Ward) and Michael and his two sisters Catherine and Anne in the 1820-1830 time frame.

== His Life ==
The name Andrew Leamy is as commonly associated with the commercial and industrial development of the City of Hull as is the name of Philemon Wright. Like most of the other illustrious names of that pioneer-era - names like Nicholas Sparks and J.R. Booth - Andrew Leamy began his business life as an employee of the Old Squire Wright in 1834, living and working on Wright's Columbia Farm and learning his future trade as a lumber baron. For a brief period of time before this, Andrew worked for Peter Aylen, taking his rafts to Quebec City.

On May 31, 1835, his close ties with the Wright family - and Nicholas Sparks no doubt - led to his eventual marriage to Philemon Wright Jr.'s daughter, Erexina, who had become Nicholas Sparks' adopted daughter after Wright Jr.'s death. Andrew was 19 and Erexina was 15.

After a few years of hard work in Wright's employ, Leamy purchased 160 hectares of land from the widow and heirs of Philemon Wright Jr.- land that included the Columbia Pond on Wright's original 'Gateno Farm' [sic]. In 1853, Leamy began his own enterprise as a lumberman by building a mill on the south shore of Columbia Pond, as it was first named, and the lake became known as Leamy Lake thereafter. Leamy's mill was built and managed for a time by none other than John Rudolphus Booth, who would go on to be a lumber Baron in his own right and the richest man in North America, as a result.

Leamy dug a canal to connect the lake to the Gatineau River to facilitate the transportation of logs to his sawmill. The mill, which was the second steam-powered mill in the region - one of only two - was entirely destroyed on June 6, 1857, when a boiler exploded, killing Leamy's eldest son, Louis-Napoleon. The mill was rebuilt but suffered a second explosion on Aug. 16, 1867, which killed at least one man and injured six, including another of Leamy's sons. The mill was never rebuilt.

Andrew Leamy was a devout Catholic and, in the tradition of the Wright family, gave much of his time to the social and cultural development of the small developing village of Wright's Town. Andrew Leamy donated the family burial ground, opened in 1809, to the Oblate Fathers after they purchased the land to create the Notre-Dame Cemetery. According to the Drouin records of Notre-Dame Parish, he was a popular best man at weddings of his workers and godfather for many families. He worked hand-in-hand with Père Reboul to achieve the emancipation of school governance for the county. The result was the creation of the county's first independent School Commission in 1866, of which he was elected the first President.

== Leamy Lake, Leamy Road, and the Leamy Farm ==
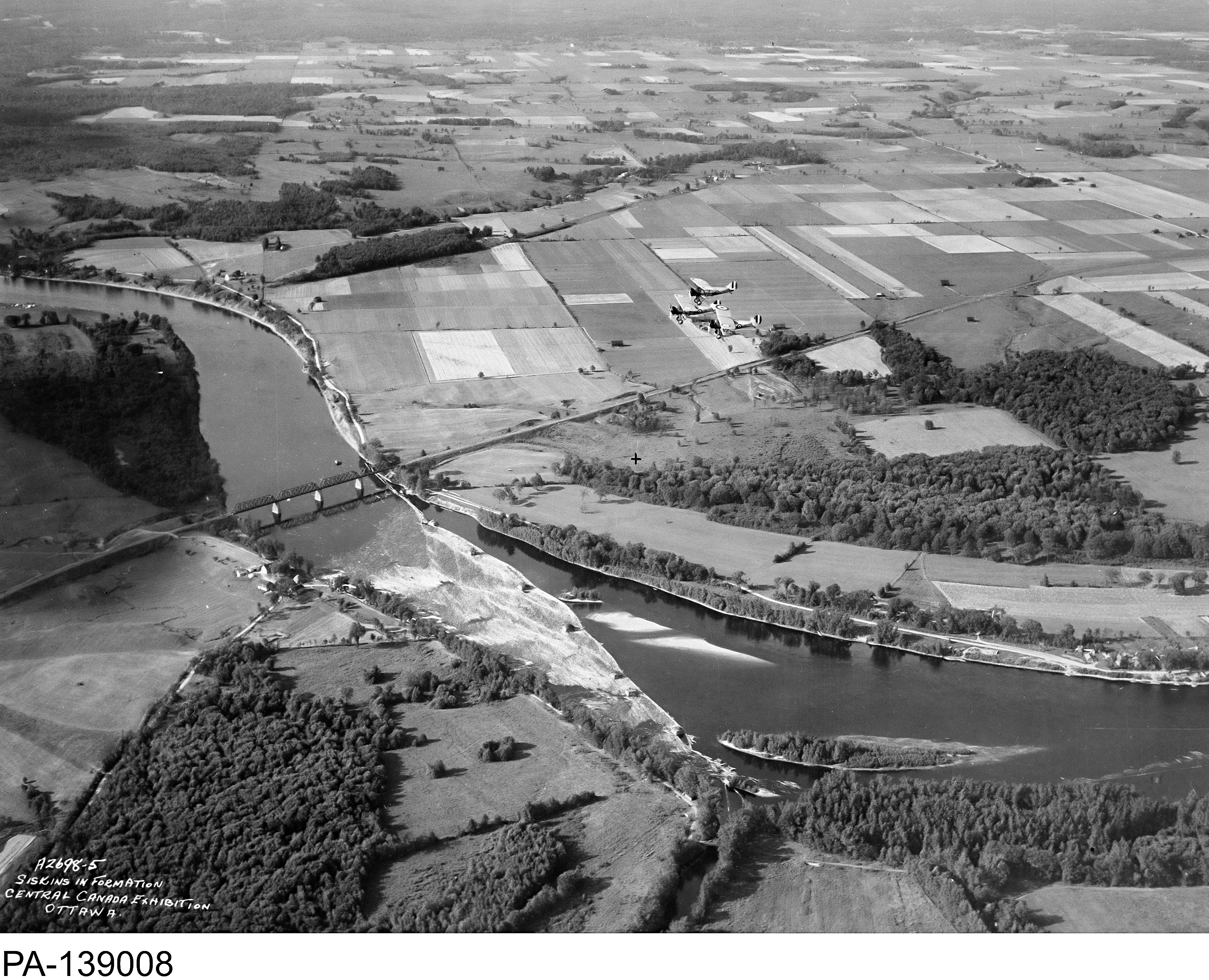
An aerial image of the Leamy Farm in 1930

Leamy's farm was the original 'Gateno' Farm, the first farm Philemon Wright created when he arrived in the area in 1800. Leamy's farm contained several buildings, one of which, right in front of his large home, was a stable for his prized racehorses. The farm, located on the north side of Leamy Lake between the lake and the Gatineau River had a long road that led from the river all the way to the intersection of Columbia Road (now St. Joseph Blvd.) and Brigham's Road (now St. Raymond Blvd.). The road exists to this day even though a good part is blocked to traffic, but it now ends at Carrière Blvd. At some unknown time, when people no longer were living on it, the Leamy Road's name became listed by the city as Chemin du Lac-Leamy and then was changed, once again in 2010, to rue Atawe, despite many objections from citizens. The Leamy road was identified in all city directories up until the middle 1950s when the Leamy home itself was moved from its foundation to parts unknown in Hull. Today the lake, the park and the very popular Casino du Lac-Leamy still carry his name.

The foundations of his home became buried over time and were the subject of an archaeological dig in 2006, commissioned by the National Capital Commission. What was found was a significant structure, quite remarkable in its construction because of the substantial width of the stone walls.

A log building that was still standing in 1884 on Leamy's farm was probably the first home Philemon Wright built on the banks of the Gatineau River when he first arrived in the area in 1800. The Wright family called that home "The Wigwam". It was the conclusion of another archeological dig at that site that the foundations of that house dated from the early 19th century. Leamy family oral history describes the Leamy home as occupying the spot where Philemon's home was situated, presumably Wright's 2nd home on the "Gateno" Farm. The location was reburied for preservation and protection, and the NCC has plans for future commemoration of the site.

== His Character ==
From Andrew Leamy's obituary in the Citizen, April 1868:

"There were few men better known in Ottawa and the surrounding country in the sixties than Andrew Leamy of Gatineau Point, sawmill owner and lumberman. Mr. Leamy came of the pioneer family after whom Leamy's Lake, back of Hull, was named. Andrew Leamy was a large and powerful man and was noted for his strength and aggressiveness. He was essentially a man of the great outdoors. As a lumberman, his name was known far and wide. He had thousands of friends."

Anson A. Gard, author and historian, wrote this about Andrew Leamy:

"It is told of him, as showing his strength and endurance, that when repairs were needed for the mill, that he would mount a horse and carry the part – often of heavy iron – to Montreal, get it mended and without stopping to rest, would ride back to Hull, making a journey of 240 miles through a wild country, under the most tiring conditions."
"I recently met an old resident of the Township, who remembered many of the pioneers. He was one of those rare beings who seemed to remember only the good qualities of the men he had known. "Another kind hearted man" said he "was Andy Leamy. I've known him to be driving along the road with a load of supplies for his lumber camp, and passing the hovel of a family in need, throw off a barrel of flour and pass on as though he thought nothing of it. Andy didn't make much pretense of being a saint, but he did a whole lot of good all the same."

John Lowrey Gourlay wrote this passage about an incident of a religious nature that occurred in 1835 in Wright's Town, when Leamy was 19 years-old:

"A man of fervor, (Reverend) Burwell, declared to his people from the pulpit, and in the parlor, shop and store, his newly-found views that struck most people with the force of all new ideas. His success in Hull seemed considerable, several influential people becoming obedient to the new faith. ... Nevertheless the mob in Hull undertook to dictate to those who took up the new opinions, or at least to greatly disturb their meetings. ... The late Andrew Leamy, a famous old warrior, took sometimes an active hand in these troubles. Often from sharp and angry words they went to blows, marking each others face's very picturesquely. ... Rev. Adam Hood Burwell eloquently and ably propagated these notions, and one or two Presbyterian families or heads of families were pleased with the views he advanced and for a time joined the party. Mr. Ruggles Wright opposed these views and refused his hall for their propagation. Mr. Alonzo Wright did not join them, but fiercely opposed the mobs, sometimes led by his uncle, Mr. Andrew Leamy who handled them roughly."

In 1874, William Pittman Lett, Ottawa's first City Clerk, in his epic poem "Recollections of Bytown and Its Old Inhabitants" writes:

"And Andrew Leamy in his time.
Was head of many a stirring "shine;"
A man of mark he might be singled,
In whom the good and bad commingled,
In equal balance in such a way,
That each in turn had its sway.
He's gone! The grass grows o'er his head,
The Muse deals gently with the dead."

William Lett's poem makes reference to Leamy's participation in one event where Leamy participated in a brawl in 1837, when 21 yr.-old Andrew and others were charged with creating a disturbance at a lumbermen's meeting in Bytown. The meeting was disrupted by Catholics who were protesting the "disrespect offered by the Protestants to a statue of the Virgin Mary" in the procession of the day before. Once again, Leamy was thus involved in a conflict of a religious nature, a disturbance cited by Dr. Michael S. Cross, historian, as an example of how the many disturbances during the Shiners' War not only had little to do with logging, but may also have had nothing to do with the Shiners (One disputed allegation recorded in the testimony of the case indicates that the men were associated with Peter Aylen). Andrew was only accused of breaking a window to enter the room and was acquitted of the charge of creating a disturbance.

There is little doubt that Andrew Leamy learned to use his fists in his early days in the timber camps, and, like so many other fights involving lumbermen, the result could lead to tragedy. In 1845, in an incident in Wright's Town, reported in both the Kingston Chronicle & Gazette (March 3) and then in the Bytown Gazette (May 16), it is reported that, as a result of a fight with Andrew Leamy over a paddle, a "fine, young Highlander" by the name of Donald McCrae lost his life on February 23. Andrew Leamy pleaded self-defense to the charge of murder in the trial of the death of Donald McRea on August 5, 1846, in Montreal, and was acquitted.

== His Death ==
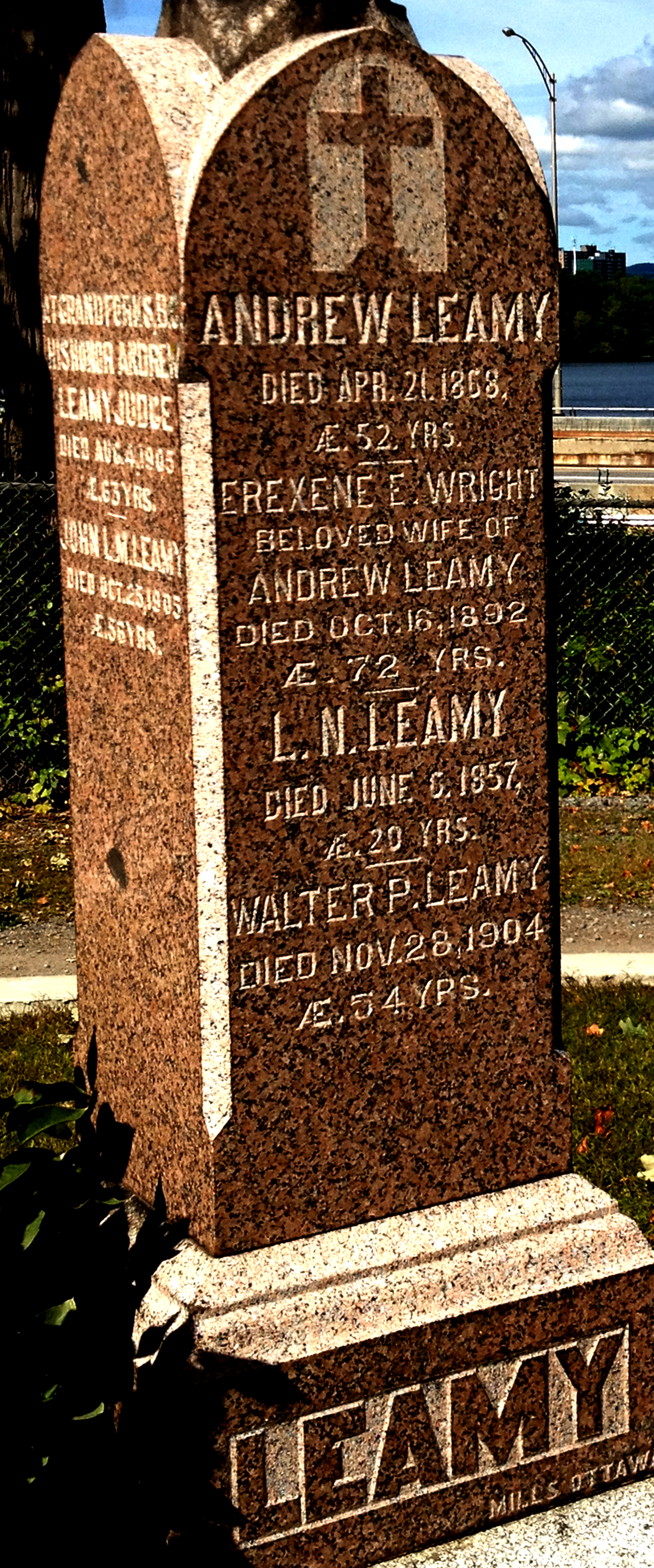
Andrew & Erexina Leamy's headstone at Notre Dame Cemetery in Hull

On the dark & stormy night of April 21, 1868, one year after Canada was born, Andrew Leamy was last seen heading home on the old Leamy Road. But he never made it home alive. He was mortally injured in what appeared to be a nasty carriage accident. He was found the next morning, bleeding heavily from his head and with severely bruised ribs. To his family and everyone else, it appeared that Leamy had suffered the same tragic fate that his late father-in-law, Philemon Wright Jr. had, when he also was thrown from his carriage when it overturned, and died some 47 years earlier.

Leamy had a whole stable full of spirited racehorses, and days after, it was said by a friend that Leamy had hitched up one of the most spirited among them, that very afternoon.

Leamy did not linger long. He died that day. The family mourned and then the community moved on. Only it appears that long after anyone still wondered what happened that night, a "falling out" between a husband and his wife finally solved the mystery of Leamy's death, 10 years later. In an article that first appeared in the Toronto Globe on August 15, 1878, and reprinted in the New York Times four days later, it was published that a Henry Maxwell, a laborer who had been in Leamy's employ, and his unnamed brother-in-law were arrested for the murder and robbery of Andrew Leamy.

Leamy's murder occurred exactly two weeks to the day after the assassination of his good friend and fellow Irishman, Thomas D'Arcy McGee. Andrew Leamy's grandson, Andrew D'Arcy McReady, was named after his godfather, Thomas D'Arcy McGee.

Andrew Leamy is buried in a piece of land that he had donated to the Church for the purpose of creating Notre Dame Cemetery in Gatineau, Quebec. His resting place can be found in a rear portion that overlooks the lake that today still bears his name. At his feet lie the remains of a young man named George Smyth. The stone that marks his grave is inscribed with the words:

Here
Lies the
Boddy of George Smyth
son to Thomas Smyth esq. of Eli
zabeth Town, DE of
Jonstown, Upr. Provence
dround at the three roks
upon the River Reado
6 May 1809
Aged 20 years & 6 months(sic)

Philemon Wright's lumbermen happened to be on the banks of the Ottawa River opposite the Rideau Falls, when the young man's body was found. He had the young man's remains buried in a beautiful, quiet corner of his property. Wright must have either known who he was or found out later. In any event, a stone was engraved with the above inscription. Today, we know that George Smyth was the youngest son of Lieutenant Thomas Smyth, esq, the man who gave his name to Smiths Falls on the Rideau River.

== Other sources ==
1. Walking in the Footsteps of Philemon Wright. Henderson, Rick (2016), Gatineau, Quebec: Dadson Lane Productions, ISBN 978-1-365-57649-2
2. Family Search
3. The Family of John and Priscilla Wright
4. "The Wrights", Patrick M. O. Evans, (National Capital Commission, 1978), Table 35, Page 57
5. "The Wrights", Patrick M. O. Evans, (National Capital Commission, 1978), Table 100, Page 149
