= Beasley =

Beasley may refer to:

== Places ==
=== United States ===
- Beasley, Tennessee, an unincorporated community
- Beasley, Texas, a city
- Beasley (Tampa), a neighborhood within the City of Tampa, Florida

=== Elsewhere ===
- Beasley, Hamilton, a neighbourhood of the city in Ontario, Canada
- Beasley, Staffordshire, a suburb of Newcastle-under-Lyme in Staffordshire, England, United Kingdom

== Other uses ==
- Beasley (surname)
- Beasley Broadcast Group, a Florida-based radio station company
- Beasley Coliseum, a multi-purpose venue at Washington State University
- Mrs. Beasley, doll carried around by character in American sitcom Family Affair
- Temple University Beasley School of Law, a law school at Temple University, Pennsylvania

== See also ==
- Beasley House (disambiguation)
- Beesley (disambiguation)
- Beazley (disambiguation)
- Besley, a surname
- Bissli, an Israeli wheat-based snack
- Bijli (disambiguation)
- Justice Beasley (disambiguation)
