= John Beasley =

John Beasley or Jack Beasley may refer to:

- John Beasley (actor) (1943–2023), American actor
- John Beasley (basketball) (1944–2022), American basketball player
- John Beasley (chess composer) (1940–2024), British mathematician and chess composer
- John Beasley (cycling coach), Australian track cycling coach
- John Beasley (cyclist) (1930–2017), Australian Tour de France cyclist
- John Beasley (musician) (born 1958), American keyboardist
- John Beasley (American football) (born 1945), American football player
- John R. Beasley (1900–1978), American football player
- Jack Beasley (John Albert Beasley, 1895–1949), Australian politician
- Jack Beasley (footballer) (John Beasley, 1916–1982), English footballer

== See also ==
- Beasley (surname)
