= Beasley (surname) =

Beasley is a surname of English origin deriving from a town in Lancashire meaning “bent grass”.

Notable people with the surname include:

- Aaron Beasley (born 1973), American football player
- Alice Beasley (born 1945), American quilter, textile artist
- Allyce Beasley (born 1951), American actress
- Barney Beasley (1895–1951), American character actor
- Bruce Beasley (American sculptor) (born 1939), American sculptor
- Caroline Beasley, Irish jockey
- Cecil A. Beasley (1876–1959), American lawyer and politician from Alabama
- Cheri Beasley (born 1966), American judge
- Chris Beasley (researcher), Australian political scientist
- Christine Beasley, British-born dame and the Chief Nursing Officer of England
- Cole Beasley (born 1989), American football player
- DaMarcus Beasley, American soccer player; brother of Jamar
- David Beasley, American politician from South Carolina
- Debra Lafave, nee Beasley, American teacher and registered sex offender
- Eileen Beasley (1921–2012), Welsh language campaigner
- Fred Beasley, American football player
- George Beasley, Australian footballer
- George Beasley-Murray, English religious scholar
- George G. Beasley (1932–2021), American radio executive
- Henry Beasley, Indian-born British officer and bridge player
- Irene Beasley, American singer
- Jack Beasley, Australian politician
- Jamar Beasley, American soccer player; brother of DaMarcus
- Jere Beasley, American politician from Alabama
- Jeremy Beasley (born 1980), American baseball player
- Jerome Beasley, American basketball player
- John Beasley (disambiguation)
  - John Beasley (actor) (1943–2023), American actor
  - John Beasley (basketball) (1944–2022), American basketball player
  - John Beasley (football player), American football player and commentator
  - John Beasley (musician), American composer, pianist, producer, and arranger
- Kaleb Beasley (born 2005), American football player
- Kayden Beasley (born 2006), American sledge hockey player
- Kenneth La'ron Beasley (born 1997), American musician
- Kevin Beasley, American artist
- Larry Beasley, Canadian urban planner
- Malcolm Beasley, American physicist in the field of superconductivity
- Malik Beasley, American basketball player
- Marco Beasley, Neapolitan–British tenor and musicologist
- Maria E. Beasley (c. 1836–1913), American inventor and businesswoman
- Michael Beasley (born 1989), American basketball player
- Nate Beasley (1953–2010), American football player
- Owen Beasley, Chief Justice of the Madras High Court (British India)
- Pat Beasley, English football player and coach
- Pierce Beasley, or Piaras Béaslaí (1881–1965), Irish politician
- Richard Beasley (author), Australian author
- Richard Beasley (politician), American-born, Canadian-residing businessman, politician, and soldier
- Richard Beasley, convicted of luring three men to their deaths via a Craigslist ad in 2011
- Richard Lee Beasley, American politician from South Carolina
- Sharon Beasley-Teague (born 1952), American politician
- Sheree Beasley, Australian murder victim
- Simon Beasley (born 1956), Australian footballer
- Thomas W. Beasley, American lawyer, political activist, businessman; co-founder of Corrections Corporation of America
- Tom Beasley (born 1954), American football player
- Tony Beasley (born 1966), American baseball coach
- William Beasley, Irish jockey

== See also ==
- Beazley
- Beesley
- Beesly
- Besley
