= Beasley House =

Beasley House may refer to:

in the United States

- Beasley Homestead, Bethel Heights, Arkansas, listed on the National Register of Historic Places (NRHP) in Benton County
- John M. Beasley House, Sarasota, Florida, NRHP-listed in Manatee County
- Beasley House (Lavonia, Georgia), NRHP-listed in Franklin County
- Craig-Beasley House, also known as Gaines House, in Franklin, Tennessee, NRHP-listed in Williamson County
- Beasley-Parham House, near Greenbrier, Tennessee, NRHP-listed

== See also ==
- Beasley Building, Athens, Ohio, NRHP-listed
- Beasley (disambiguation)
