= Richard Beasley =

Richard Beasley may refer to:

- Richard Beasley (politician) (1761–1842), soldier, political figure, farmer and businessman from Upper Canada
- Richard Beasley (author) (born 1964), Australian author
- Richard Lee Beasley (1930–2012), American politician from South Carolina
- Richard Beasley (serial killer) (born 1959), American serial killer convicted of luring three men to their deaths via a Craigslist ad in 2011
- Richard Beasley (physician), New Zealand medical academic
