= Garden of the Provinces and Territories =

Park in Ottawa, Canada

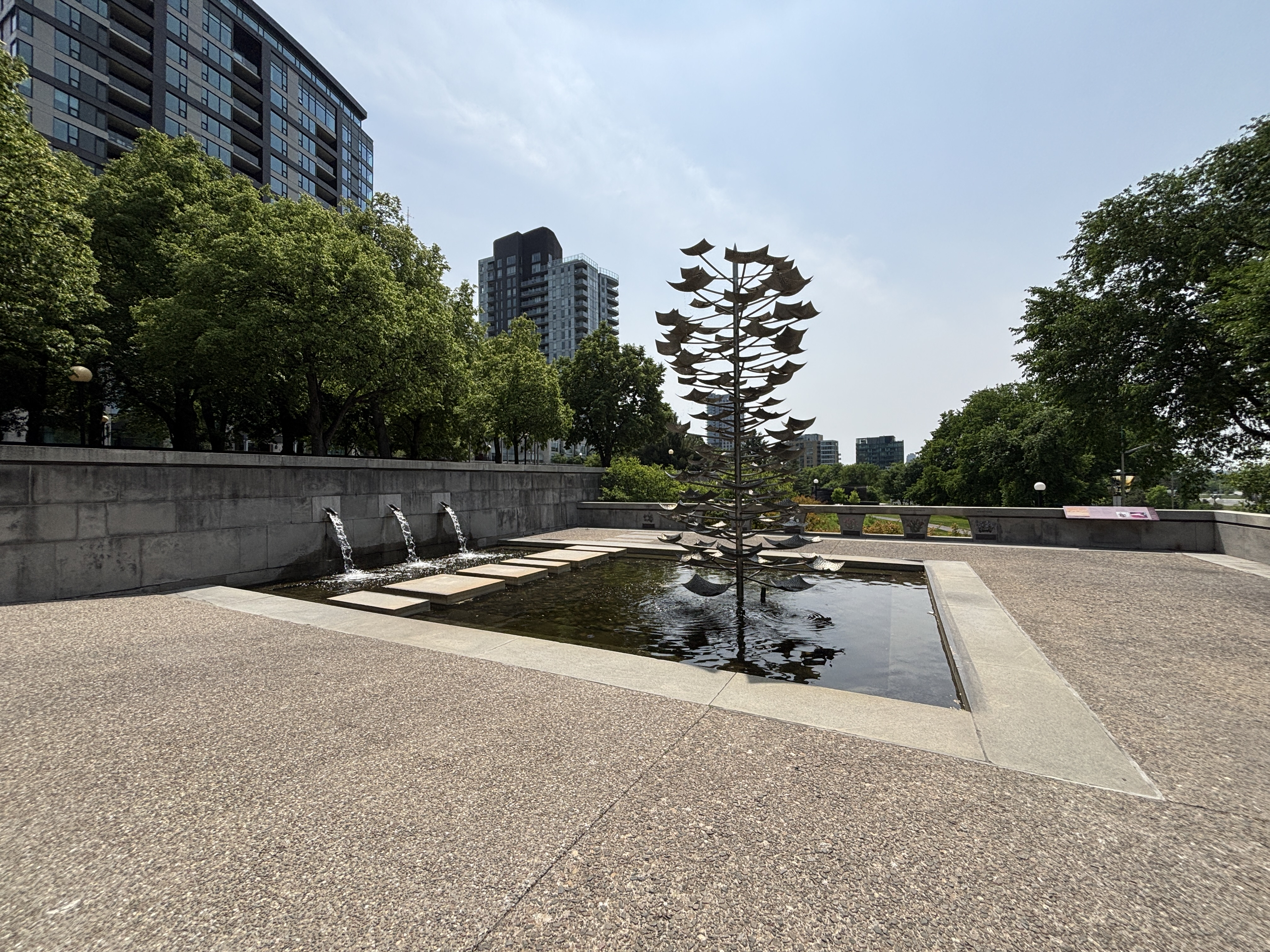
- Fountin of the Garden of the Provinces and Territories
- Interactive map of Garden of the Provinces and Territories
- Type: Public garden
- Location: Wellington Street at Bay Street, Ottawa, Ontario, Canada
- Coordinates: 45.418358°N 75.708858°W
- Area: 4 acres (1.6 ha)
- Opened: September 25, 1962
- Designer: Don W. Graham
- Operator: Government of Canada

The Garden of the Provinces and Territories (French: Jardins des provinces et des territoires) is a 4-acre (1.6 ha) site along Confederation Boulevard in Ottawa, Ontario, Canada's capital city. It is bounded by the Sparks Street escarpment on the south, Wellington Street on the west and north, and Bay Street to the east between Christ Church Cathedral and the Library and Archives Canada. It was officially opened on September 25, 1962, as a western gateway to the Parliament Buildings. The park was renamed from "Garden of the Provinces" on October 6, 2005 to recognize and include Canada's three territories. Scott Brison, then the Minister of Public Works and Government Services Canada, officially renamed the park.

In December 2015, the federal government requested that the National Capital Commission approve the garden as the site of the proposed Memorial to the Victims of Communism rather than its previously approved site, a plot of land by the Supreme Court of Canada building.

Improvement initiatives to the garden undertaken by the National Capital Commission was designated a legacy project as part of the 150th Anniversary of Canada in 2017.

== Description ==
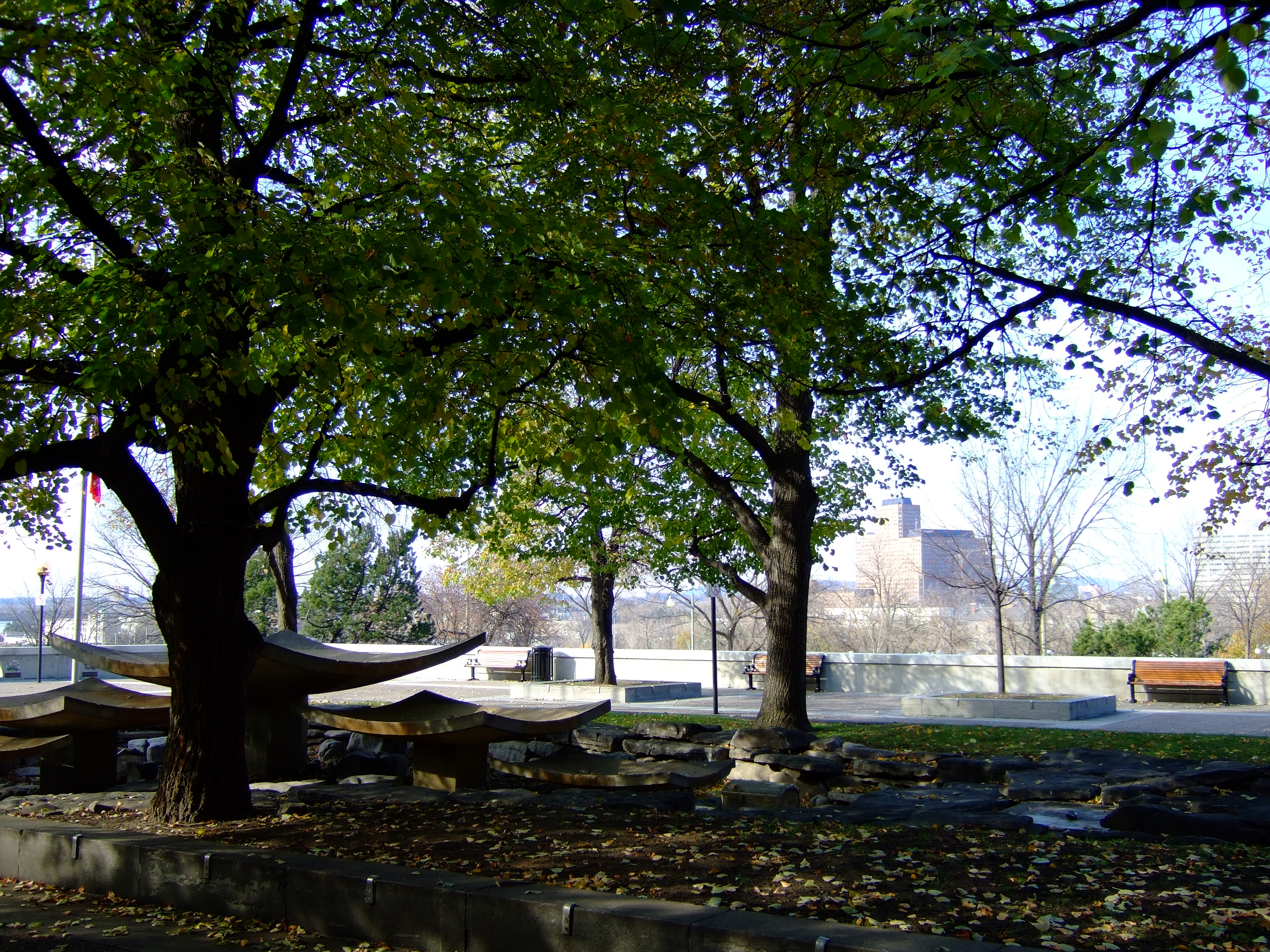
The concrete slab structure representing the Great Lakes in the Garden of the Provinces and Territories

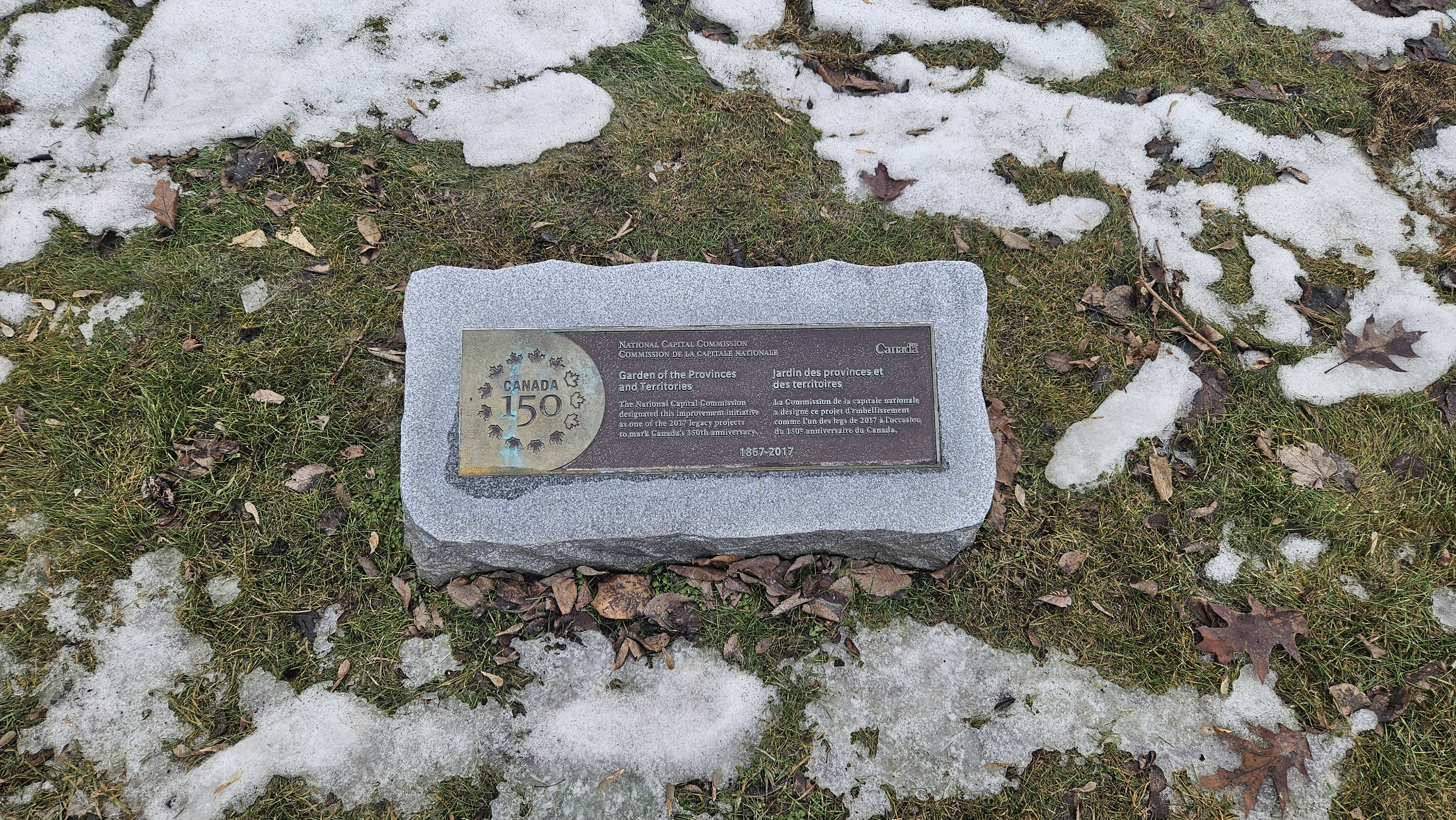
Photograph of a plaque in the Garden of Provinces and Territories where the National Capital Commission designates improvements to the garden as one of the legacy initiatives for Canada's 150th Anniversary in 2017

One quarter of the site is composed of formal terraces, with the flags of the provinces and territories in the order of their entry to Confederation. Bronze plaques include the floral emblems for each of the provinces and territories. A 6-metre (20 ft) tall fountain symbolizes a tree. A structure of concave concrete slabs portrays the Great Lakes.

The Garden of the Provinces and Territories is a popular site when filled with tulips, and other flowers, during the annual Tulip Festival. This garden links to the main pedestrian/bicycle paths, including a pedestrian tunnel under Wellington Street. It is located on a common route between the Portage Bridge to government headquarters in Gatineau, and Parliament Hill and government central agencies headquartered downtown.

The site was once part of the Nicholas Sparks (1794-1862) estate, a combination of swamp and wild forest bought by the major Bytown landlord and philanthropist in 1826.

== Design ==
The garden was first envisioned by Prime Minister William Lyon Mackenzie King and the French urbanist, Jacques Gréber, at a meeting at the 1937 Exposition Internationale des Arts et Techniques dans la Vie Moderne in Paris. It was formally proposed in the 1950 Gréber Plan. The modernist garden was designed in 1960 by Don W. Graham, and was built in anticipation of Canada's upcoming centennial. A 6 cent centennial stamp commemorates the garden with Queen Elizabeth in the foreground.

The creation of the garden is associated with a rising sense of provincial identity in the early sixties which manifested as the creation of informal flags. When the garden was under development not all provinces had formal flags, but they did have arms. Four of the provinces appealed in favour of their formal flag, but this plan was rejected. The original flags which were displayed showed the shield of each province on a coloured field, and included the Yukon and the Northwest Territories despite their lack of provincial status. These flags were flown until sometime in the 1970s.

The renaming ceremony in October 2005 was also the reopening of the Garden after years of rehabilitation, such as restoring the signature tree-shaped metal fountain, upgrading the water supply, extensive stonework repairs, new access ramps, and updating the provincial and territorial Coat of Arms.

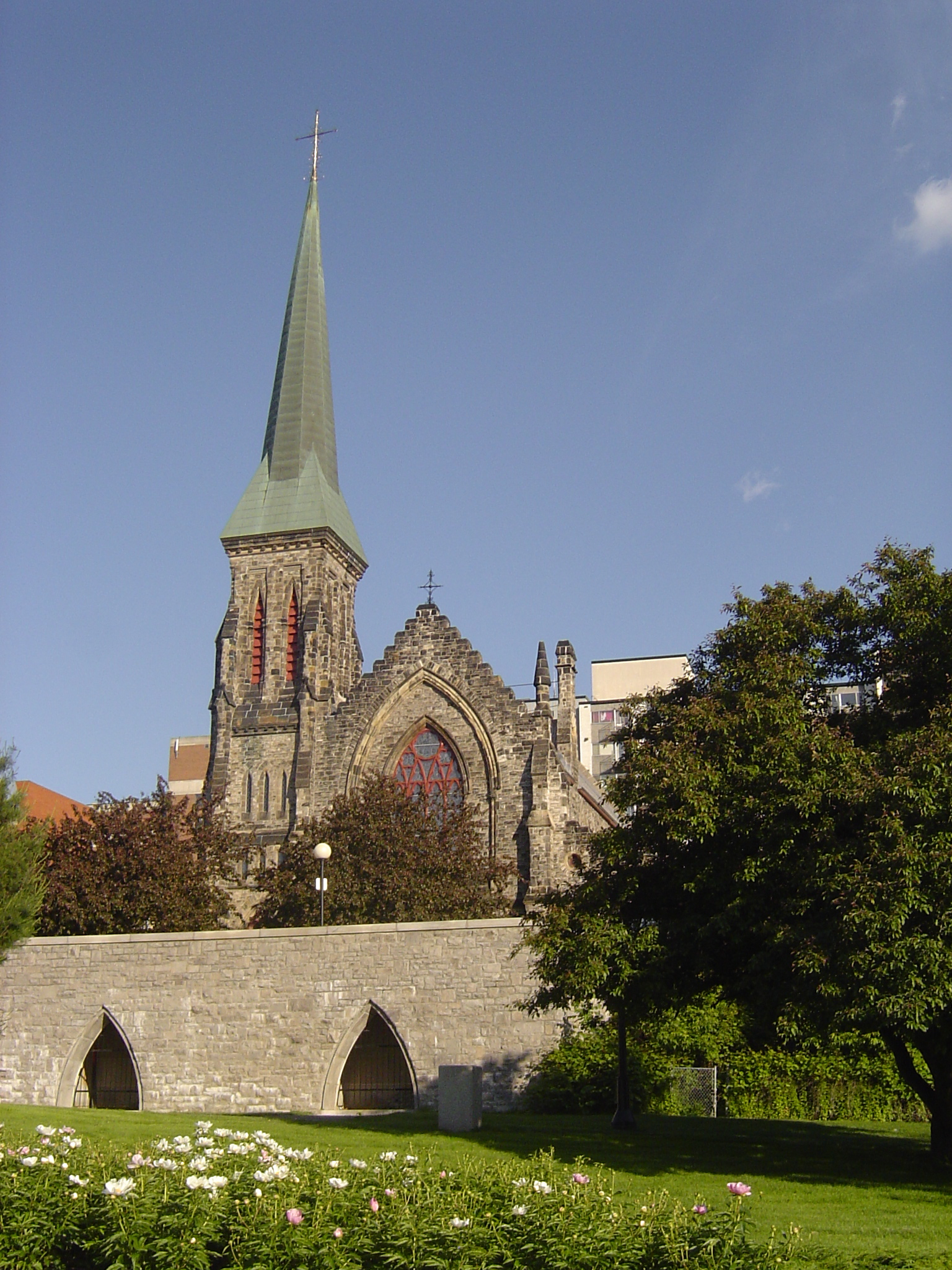
View of Christ Church Cathedral from the Garden of the Provinces and Territories in Spring
