= Beesley =

Beesley is a surname. Notable people with the surname include:

- Alan Beesley, South African politician
- Alfred Beesley (died 1847), English topographer and poet
- Bradley Beesley, American filmmaker
- Colin Beesley (born 1951), English footballer
- Damon Beesley (born 1971), English writer and television producer
- Ebenezer Beesley (1840–1906), American Mormon hymn writer and composer
- George Beesley (died 1591), English Catholic priest and martyr
- Jake Beesley (born 1996), English footballer
- John Alan Beesley (1927–2009), Canadian civil servant and diplomat
- Lawrence Beesley (1877–1967), English science teacher, journalist and author
- Mark Beesley (born 1980), English footballer
- Matt Beesley (born 1992), English rugby union player
- Matt Earl Beesley, American film and television director
- Max Beesley (born 1971), English actor and musician
- Meghan Beesley (born 1989), British athlete
- Michael Beesley (1924–1999), British industrial economist and politician
- Mike Beesley (born 1942), English footballer
- Paul Beesley (born 1965), English footballer
- Shayla Beesley (born 1988), American actress
- Terence Beesley (1957–2017), English actor
- William Beesley (1895–1966), English recipient of the Victoria Cross

== See also ==
- Beasley (surname)
- Beazley, surname
- Beesly
- Besley
