= Tour Eiffel Bridge =

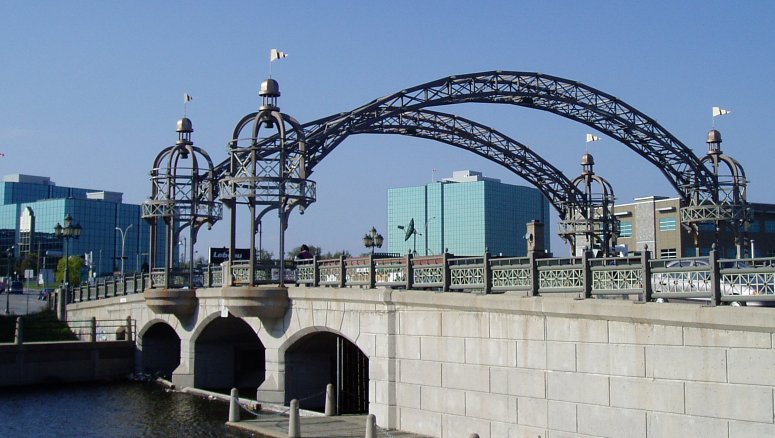
- Coordinates: 45°25′46″N 75°43′37″W
- Locale: Gatineau, Quebec, Canada
- Other name: Montcalm Street Bridge
- ID number: Q4304521

History
- Opening: 1990

The Tour Eiffel Bridge, also known as the Montcalm Street Bridge, is a small but ornate bridge in Gatineau, Quebec, Canada.

== History ==
There had long been a bridge across Brewery Creek, but by the 1980s it needed to be replaced. Hull and the National Capital Commission were working to turn the Brewery Creek area into a tourist and cultural district.

It was decided to build an ornate structure. Incorporated in the bridge was an original steel girder from the Eiffel Tower, that had been part of a recently disassembled staircase.

The girder was donated to Hull by Paris mayor Jacques Chirac. Architects Paul Martineau and Eric Haar modeled the bridge on Parisian style. It opened in 1990.

== See also ==
- Ponte Eiffel
