= Memorial to the Victims of Communism (Canada) =

Monument under construction in Ottawa, Canada

Coordinates: 45°25′06″N 75°42′32″W

Memorial to the Victims of Communism – Canada, a Land of Refuge
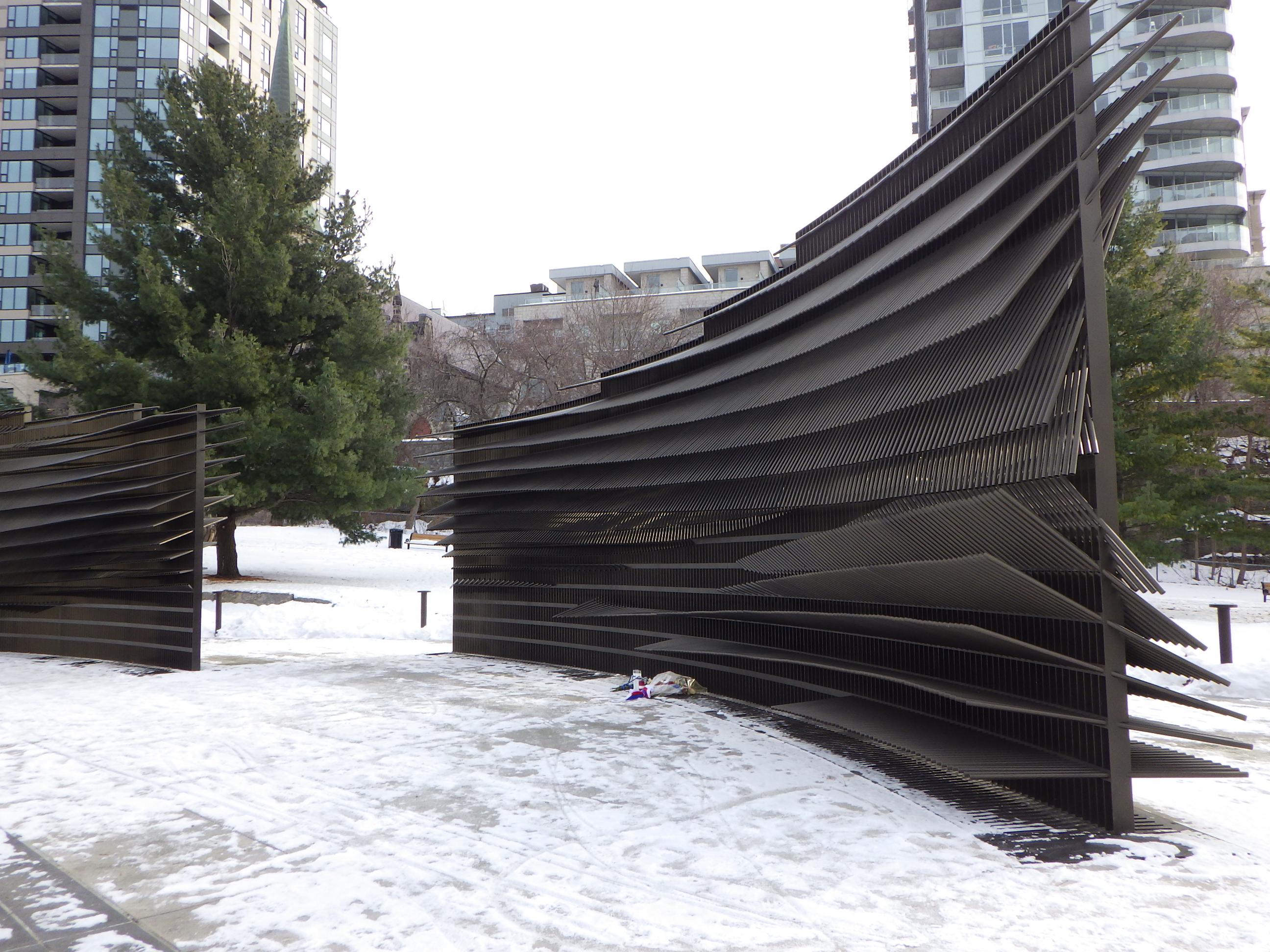
- View of the memorial on December 15, 2024, after the official opening.
- Interactive map of Memorial to the Victims of Communism – Canada, a Land of Refuge
- Dedicated date: December 12, 2024
- Dedicated to: Victims of communist regimes
- Website: Heritage Canada website

The Memorial to the Victims of Communism – Canada, a Land of Refuge (French: Monument aux victimes du communisme - Le Canada, une terre d'accueil) is a monument in Ottawa, Ontario, Canada. It was officially unveiled on December 12, 2024.

Its official unveiling was to have occurred on November 2, 2023, but was delayed as a result of the Yaroslav Hunka scandal and concerns that the names of Waffen SS members and other Nazi collaborators have been submitted for recognition, as well as other concerns. A 2023 report for the Department of Canadian Heritage recommended that 330 of the 553 names listed on the monument's Wall of Remembrance be removed due to potential links to Nazis or fascist groups. The Department of Canadian Heritage confirmed there would be no names on the memorial at the time of its unveiling pending review. In December 2025, the department stated that the proposal to add individual names to the memorial had been abandoned.

== Description ==
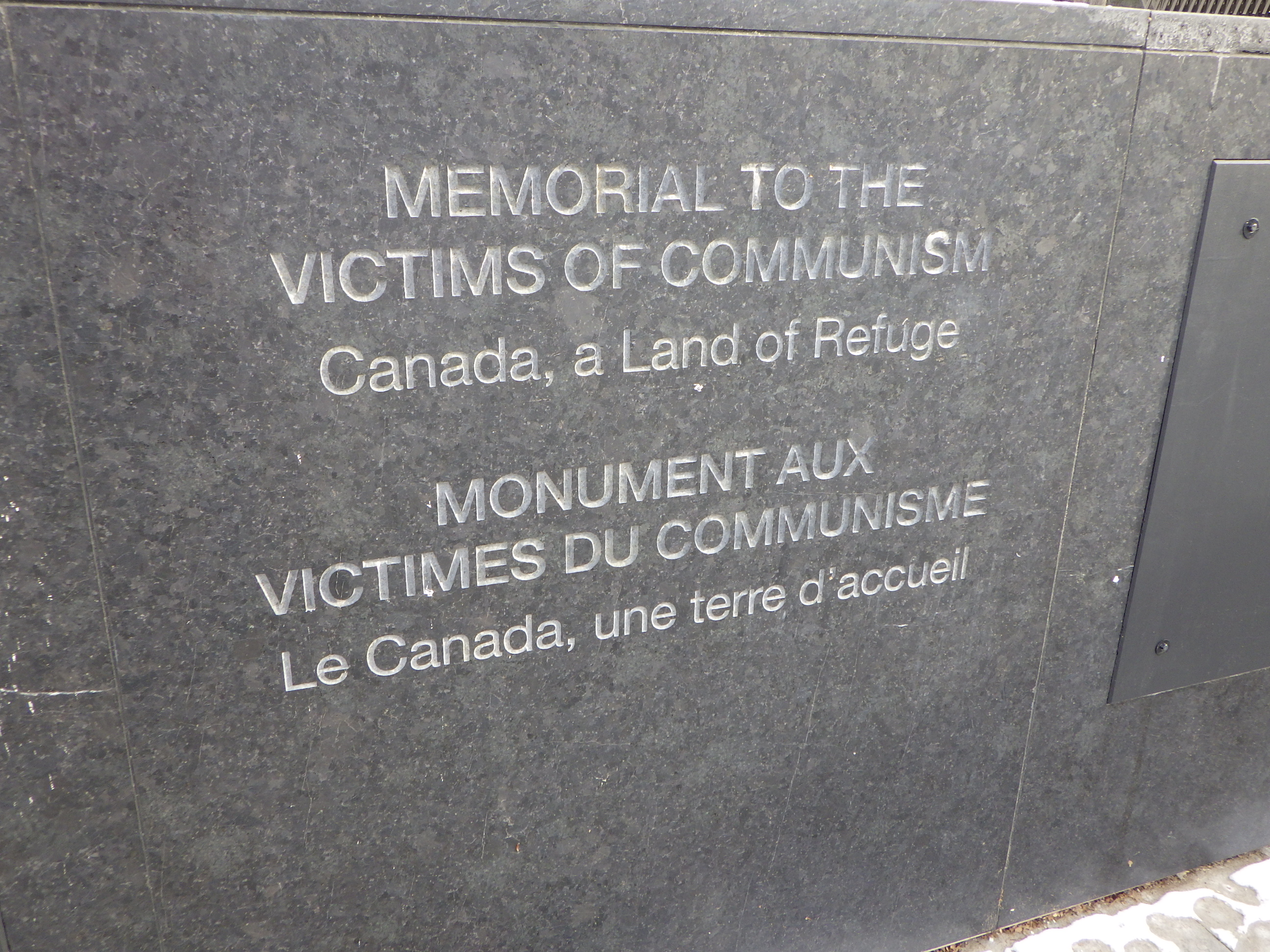
The title plinth on December 15, 2024, after the official opening.

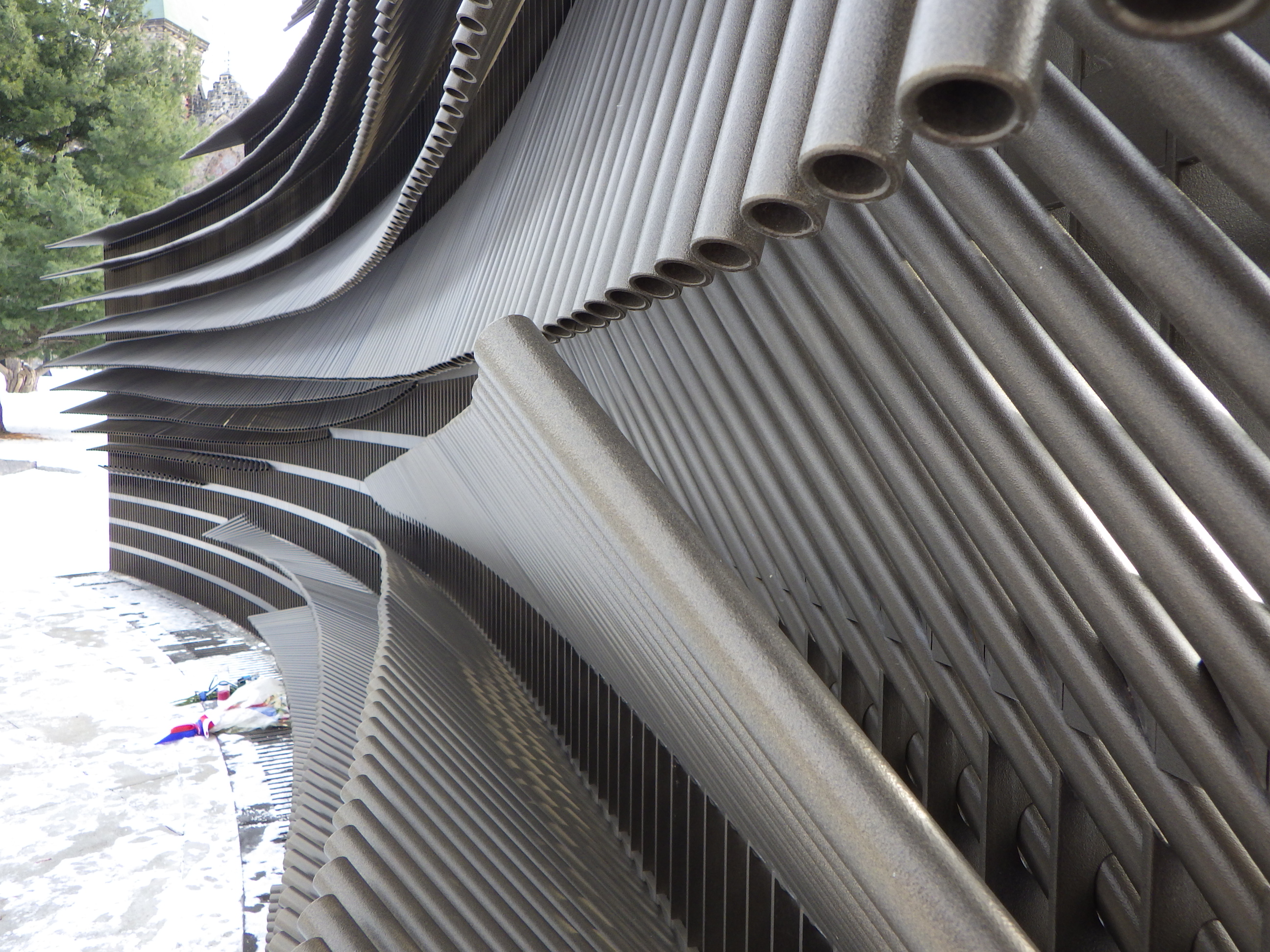
Detail of the memorial on December 15, 2024, after the official opening.

The winning design was announced in May 2017 as Arc of Memory designed by Toronto architect Paul Raff in partnership with The Planning Partnership and was described by the selection committee as follows:

The Arc of Memory features two gently curving wall-like metal frames totalling 21 metres in length and almost 4 metres in height. The walls support more than 4000 short bronze rods densely arranged along 365 steel fins, each one pointing at a unique angle of the sun, for every hour of every day, across a year. The memorial would be split in the middle at winter solstice, the darkest day of the year, inviting visitors to step through in a metaphorical journey from darkness and oppression to lightness and liberty.

== Construction ==
The site was dedicated in a ceremony held on November 2, 2017. Construction began in early November 2019, and was expected to be completed by the summer of 2020, but by the end of 2022 was still not finished, with no construction progress made in 2022.

It was officially unveiled on December 12, 2024. The cost of building the monument was reportedly CA$7.5 million, CA$6 million of which was public money provided by the government, up from an original budget of $1.5 million that was to have been provided entirely through private donations.

== History ==
=== Origins ===
Video walk around of the memorial

In 2007, Minister of Multiculturalism and Citizenship Jason Kenney toured Masaryktown, a private park owned by the Czech and Slovak community in Toronto, with Czech ambassador Pavel Vosalik and saw Crucified Again, a statue of a tortured man crucified on a hammer and sickle, commemorating victims of Soviet oppression. Kenney commented to the ambassador that the public should be able to see such a monument and they discussed the idea of creating a memorial in Ottawa.

Tribute to Liberty was founded the next year as a charity with the mission of building a monument to the victims of communism. Its nine-member board is composed of members of ethnocultural communities and whose families originate from various former or current communist states. The founding chair of the group was Philip Leong who had run as a candidate for the conservative Canadian Alliance in the 2000 federal election and is described by the National Post as a friend of Kenney's and an admirer of Stephen Harper. Alide Forstmanis, the group's treasurer who has also served as chair, ran for the Conservative Party of Canada nomination in Kitchener—Waterloo in 2007 while another former director, Wladyslaw Lizon was later elected a Conservative Member of Parliament.

In 2009, the National Capital Commission (NCC) approved the proposal to build the monument in the National Capital Region with a specific site to be determined later. It suggested modifying the memorial's name, which was originally "A Monument to Victims of Totalitarian Communism: Canada, A Land of Refuge", so that it would commemorate victims of oppressive regimes generally but Tribute to Liberty refused, however the term "totalitarian" was dropped.

=== Site and design controversy ===
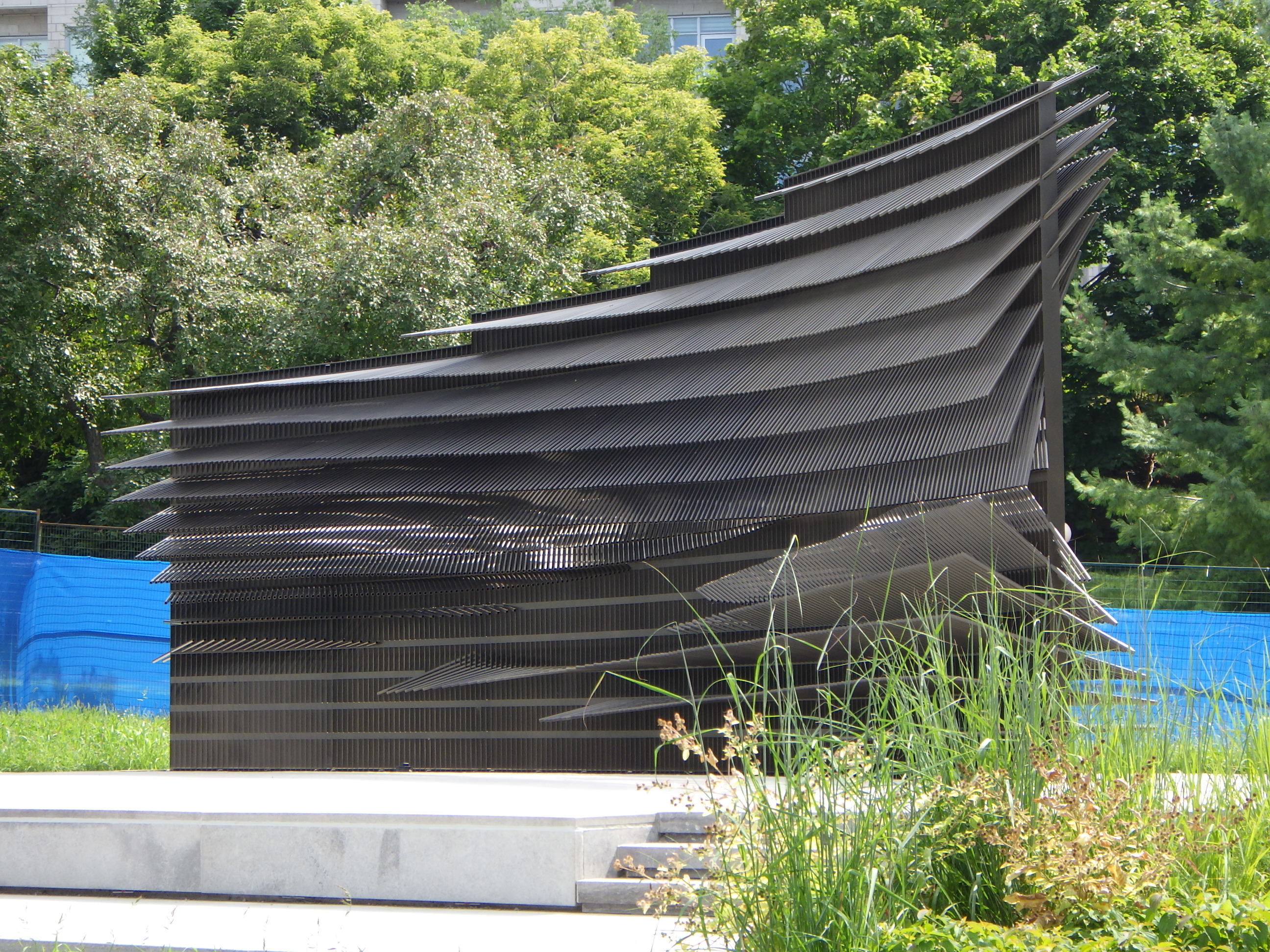
The memorial under construction on August 22, 2023. The righthand wing of "Arc of Memory" has been installed.

In 2011, the NCC approved a site for the monument at the Garden of the Provinces and Territories, to the west of Parliament Hill on Wellington Street. However, in 2012, the Harper government announced that the memorial would be built instead on a more prominent parcel of land on Wellington Street between the Supreme Court of Canada and National Library of Canada buildings, a site that had been designated for over a century as the future location of a new federal court building. In 2014, Chief Justice Beverley McLachlin expressed her concern that the memorial "could send the wrong message within the judicial precinct, unintentionally conveying a sense of bleakness and brutalism that is inconsistent with a space dedicated to the administration of justice."

A design was selected later in 2014 consisting of a series of folded concrete rows with 100 million "memory squares" to commemorate victims. A member of the design selection jury, architect Shirley Blumberg, complained that the pool of proposals the jury had to select from was "poor" and that "the one that was selected by the jury was, I think, particularly brutalist and visceral."

In June 2015, the NCC further revised the design, reducing its size so that it would cover 37% of the site rather than 60%, reducing the number of folded concrete rows to five from seven, reducing its height from 14 metres to 8 metres, and moving it further back from Wellington Street and changing its focus to telling the story of refugees from Communist states.

The October 2015 2015 federal election led to a new government led by Justin Trudeau taking office. A review of the monument proposal was done by the Trudeau government and several changes were announced.

In December 2015, Canadian Heritage Minister Mélanie Joly suggested that the NCC instead approve a 500 m^{2} (5,400 ft^{2}) installation at the original Garden of the Provinces and Territories site. Joly stated that the previous Harper government had made the project too controversial, stating "Commemorative monuments play a key role in reflecting the character, identity, history and values of Canadians. They should be places of reflection, inspiration and learning, not shrouded in controversy." In addition, Heritage Minister Joly asked that a new design be chosen for the monument with the general public being involved "from the outset of the design process through to final selection."

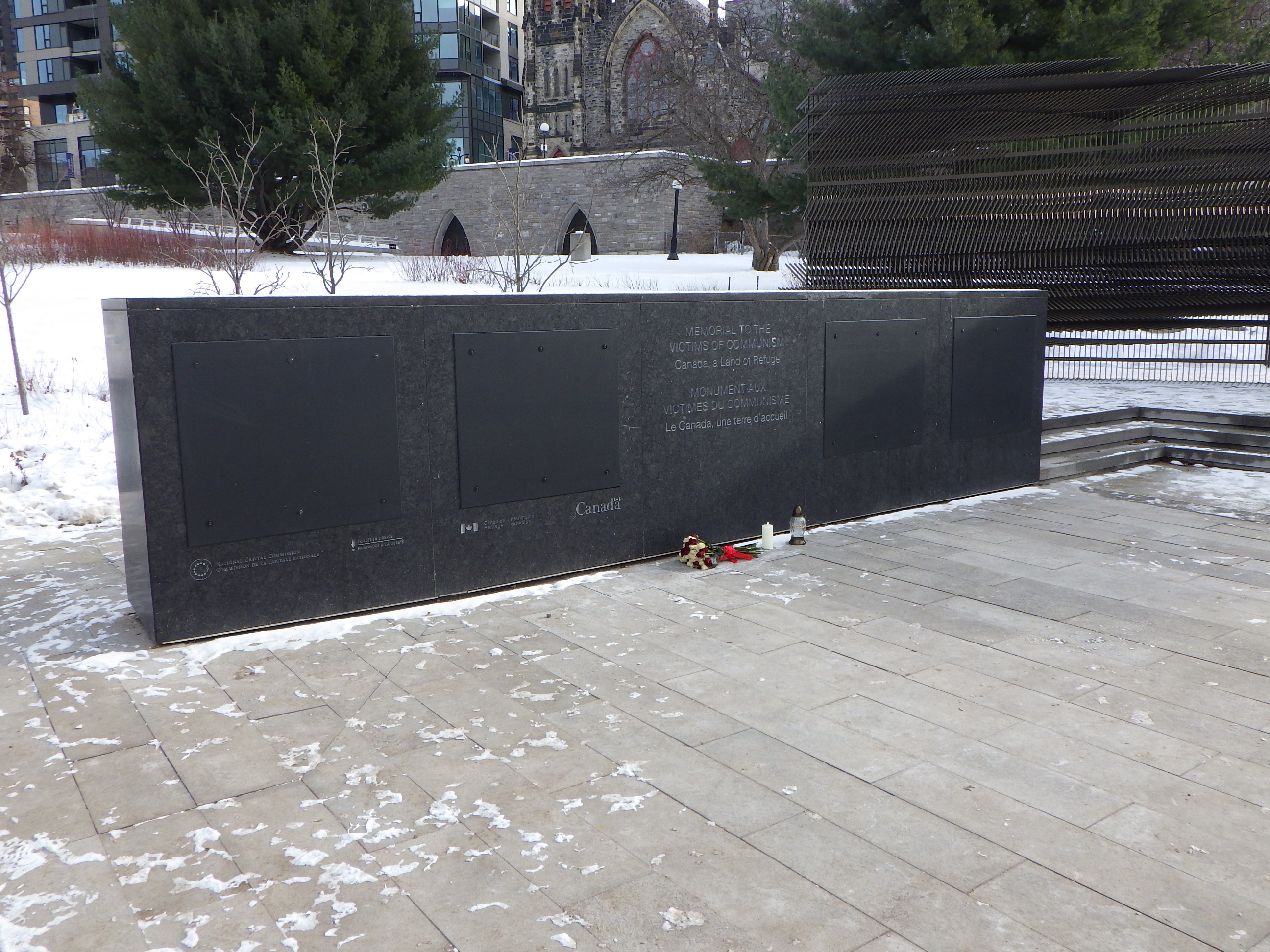
The memorial's plinth, on December 15, 2024, after the official opening, with the donor names removed.

On January 20, 2016, the NCC rescinded its previous approval for the Supreme Court of Canada site. As well, the Royal Architectural Institute of Canada (RAIC) announced that it had discontinued its court case against the NCC which would have challenged its approval of the Supreme Court of Canada site stating: "The RAIC is delighted to be ending the legal proceedings and look forward to a more appropriate commemoration being proposed."

Under the revised timeline, a national competition was held in 2016 and 2017 to select a new design for the monument. An online survey asking Canadians their opinions on the proposed monument was opened by the federal government in February 2016; the results were passed on to the design teams. The designs of the five finalists for the monument, renamed Canada: A Place of Refuge, were unveiled on March 2, 2017, with the winner was announced in May. The memorial will recognize Canada's "role as a place of refuge for people fleeing injustice and persecution, and honour the millions oppressed by communist regimes." The monument was expected to be completed by late 2018 or early 2019, but work finally commenced in November 2019.

The Harper government had originally pledged CA$3 million for the construction of the project, with the remaining amount to be raised by Tribute to Liberty. However, following the 2015 federal election, it was first reported that no government money would be going towards the project. Subsequently, however, it was announced that construction of the project had been capped at a total cost of $3 million, reduced from $5.5 million, with the Department of Canadian Heritage's contribution to be capped at $1.5 million and the rest to be provided by Tribute to Liberty, thus reducing the government's financial commitment to half its previous pledge.

=== Donations honouring Nazi collaborators ===
The monument was initially to include a Wall of Remembrance honoring 600 individuals and groups. However, concerns were raised that the names of Nazi collaborators, including individuals who participated in atrocities, had been included.

In July 2021, while the monument was still under construction, CBC News reported that Tribute to Liberty received some donations honouring fascists and Nazi collaborators, as evidenced out by the project's on-line list. The donations seem intended to sanitize or commemorate eastern European Nazi collaborators who were involved in the deportation and murder of Jews and other groups under Hitler's Final Solution, like Ustaša leader Ante Pavelić and Ukrainian Insurgent Army leader Roman Shukhevych. Ludwik Klimkowski, chair of Tribute to Liberty stated that questions about who will be commemorated "are premature" since both Tribute to Liberty and the Department of Canadian Heritage are still reviewing the final list of names which will be included on the memorial. He did not confirm that the money to commemorate Nazi collaborators was refused and returned, saying it would be "premature to comment".

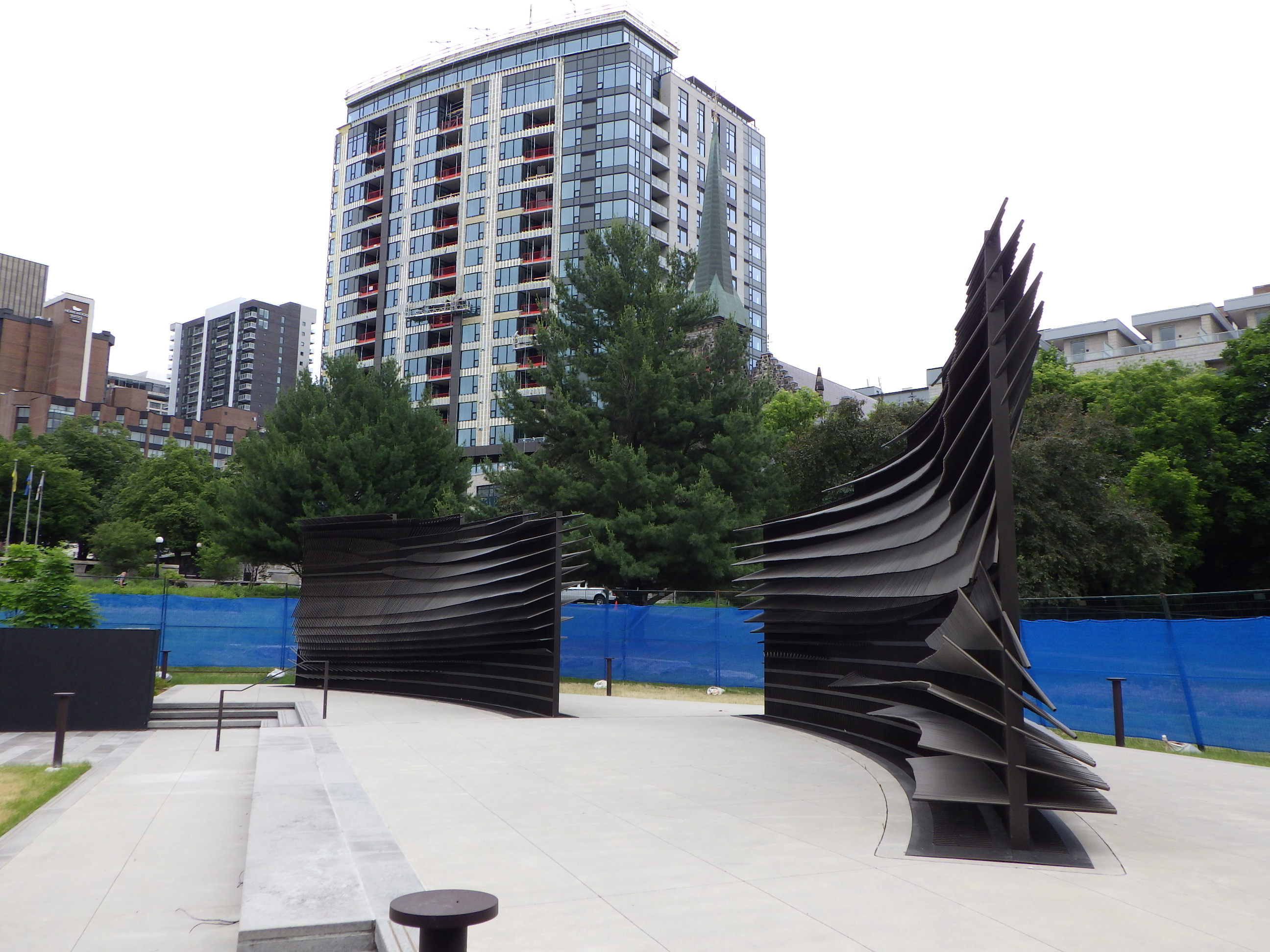
The Memorial to the Victims of Communism — Canada, a Land of Refuge on June 11, 2024, still closed to the public

The Canadian government identified the names of several individuals who served with the Waffen SS among those submitted for the memorial as well as other Nazi collaborators. Officials with the foreign affairs department warned the Department of Canadian Heritage in 2021 that "many anti-communist and anti-Soviet advocates and fighters were also active Nazi collaborators, who committed documented massacres.” Concerns about inadvertently honouring Nazi collaborators came to the fore with the Yaroslav Hunka scandal in September 2023 when failure to properly vet Hunka prior to him being invited to attend parliament to hear an address by Ukrainian President Volodymyr Zelenskyy resulted in him being invited, introduced to parliament as a war hero, and given a standing ovation only to have his wartime participation in the 14th Waffen Grenadier Division of the SS (1st Galician) come to light the next day. Consequently, the planned November 2023 unveiling was delayed with a statement posted on a government website explaining that “although the Memorial to the Victims of Communism — Canada, a Land of Refuge was scheduled to be inaugurated by the end of 2023, the Government of Canada is doing its due diligence to ensure all aspects of the memorial remain compatible with Canadian values on democracy and human rights.”

Department of Canadian Heritage officials have voiced concerns about the monument. In one memo, deputy director Tristan-E. Landry wrote: “It has come to our attention that a number of entries that have been put forward for recognition may have been affiliated in some capacity to fascist and Nazi organizations... For example, some of proposed individuals were linked to the Organization of Ukrainian Nationalists and its military, the Ukrainian Insurgent Army….and to a lesser extent with Baltic nationalist groups (i.e. members of the Latvian SS).” The Department determined that 50 to 60 of the names to have been listed on the monuments Wall of Remembrance were directly linked to Nazis. A 2023 department report recommended that more than 330 of the wall's 553 names be removed due to potential links to Nazis or fascist groups.

In December 2024, the Department of Canadian Heritage confirmed there would be no names on the memorial at the time of its unveiling, as department officials are still reviewing the backgrounds of the names and events to be commemorated in order to avoid commemorating individuals or events linked to the Nazis, Nazi collaborators or other fascists. In December 2025, the Department of Canadian Heritage declared that because of these concerns, no individual names would be included as part of the monument.

=== Other concerns ===
The formal unveiling of the monument was delayed by diplomatic concerns that it may have an undue focus on Vietnam which may strain relations with a fast-growing economy that is Canada's largest trading partner in the ASEAN. According to internal discussions at Global Affairs Canada "Highlighting events and names from countries where there were an important number of victims of communism will likely attract a negative reaction from countries cited."

Consultants to Global Affairs also raised concerns about honouring those killed in Yugoslavia by Yugoslav partisans. The Yugoslav Partisans were responsible for murdering over 100,000 persons (civilians and army) who were being repatriated by the British at the end of World War II . The Home Guard had been fighting against the Partisans and also the Italians and Germans, and had expected to be re-armed by the British. They saw the Allies as their natural allies and were dismayed in 1943, when the British re-directed captured Italian armaments to the Partisans.

A December 2024 internal report by the National Capital Commission estimated that the lifetime cost of maintenance had increased to at least $1 million from the original $240,000. The report also indicated that cracks had already appeared that had been repaired at an approximate cost of $17,000.
