= Freya Stafford =

Australian actress

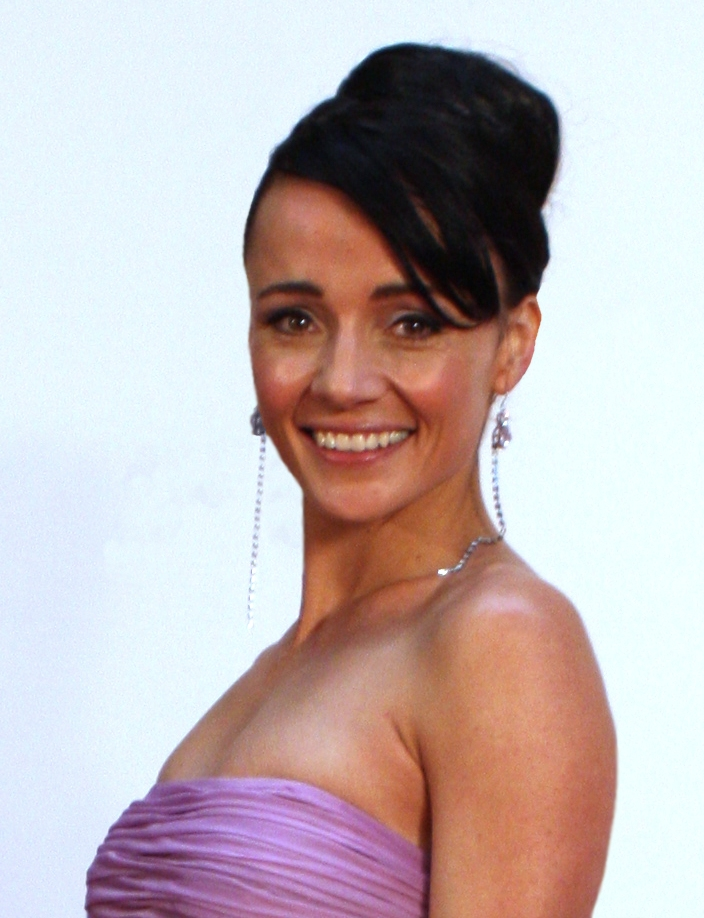
- Born: Freya Stafford; 21 January 1977 (age 48); Sydney, New South Wales, Australia
- Occupation: Actress
- Spouse: Darren McAngus

Freya Stafford (born 21 January 1977) is an Australian actress who has appeared in the television programs Head Start and White Collar Blue as central characters.

== Early life ==
Stafford was born in Sydney, New South Wales. In 1982 her family moved to Tasmania. She decided to join a drama group as she enjoyed acting and when she was eleven, she landed a role in a local production of Annie. Stafford attended the Tasmanian School of Art, before she moved to Sydney and joined the National Institute of Dramatic Art (NIDA). Stafford appeared in a video for Silverchair and various NIDA productions including There Is No Need To Wake Up, Twelfth Night and Three Sisters.

== Career ==
After graduating from NIDA, Stafford joined the cast of Head Start as bisexual film-maker Basia Lem. Stafford revealed that she chose Head Start as her first television role because it was a great launching pad for her career.

She also made a guest appearance on Network Ten's The Lost World. She has also had parts in Network Ten's mini-series Small Claims, and the Australian movies Gettin' Square and Hell Has Harbour Views.

After a forty-episode season of Head Start, Freya won a role on Network Ten's White Collar Blue, an Australian cop drama, as Detective Senior Constable Harriet Walker. White Collar Blue screened for two seasons on Australian television, before being axed by the network whilst the cast and crew were on holiday after wrapping production on the second season. Stafford did not work for three months after then re-commenced her acting career.

Stafford appeared in Network Ten's first installment of the mini-series Small Claims as Melinda Fehlers, and the Australian crime-comedy Gettin' Square, which included several internationally well-known actors, such as David Wenham (the Lord of the Rings) and Timothy Spall. Stafford played the part of Annie Flynn, parole officer for the central character, Barry Wirth's (Sam Worthington) brother Joey, and also Barry's love interest.

In 2003, she was a presenter at the 45th Australian Film Institute (AFI) awards. She also appeared in the ABC's adaptation of Richard Beasley's novel Hell Has Harbour Views as lawyer Jill Bishop. In late 2006, she starred in Bell Shakespeare's production of The Tempest, as Miranda. She also guest starred in the 2006 episode Mind Games of All Saints.

She starred in a 2007 American pilot Them, which was subsequently not picked up as a series. In 2009, she appeared as lead in a six-part drama series premiered on Sunday, 19 April, on ABC1, 'Dirt Game'. Dirt Game is a co-production between Harvey Taft Production, ABC TV and Screen Australia and developed and produced with the assistance of Film Victoria. She stars also in the horror film The Clinic who was directed by James Rabbitts.

In July 2011, it was announced that Stafford had joined the cast of Neighbours as Emilia Jovanovic. In September 2012, Stafford began appearing in the ITV drama Mrs Biggs as Julie Flower. In 2014 she made a cameo appearance in the movie Predestination.

== Personal life ==
Stafford was engaged to Nigel Joseph, before she married fellow actor Darren McAngus.

In August 2010, Stafford was forced to put her career on hold after she suffered major facial injuries after a road accident. Stafford collided with a car whilst out riding her bike in Elwood with McAngus. She went over the handlebars and was knocked unconscious, Stafford was taken to the Alfred Hospital suffering from a broken left jaw, a broken right eye socket, a broken cheekbone and dental damage. Stafford had to wait two weeks for the swelling to subside, before she could undergo reconstructive surgery, but she did not sustain any major scarring on her face. The actress saw a counsellor during her recovery.

== Filmography ==
=== Film ===
Year	Title	Role	Notes
2003	Gettin' Square	Annie Flynn	
2010	The Clinic	Veronica	
2010	Summer Coda	Rachel	
2014	Predestination	Alice	

=== Television ===
Year	Title	Role	Notes
2001	Head Start	Basia Lem	Main role
2002	The Lost World	Una	Episode: "The Imposters"
2002–03	White Collar Blue	Harriet Walker	Main role
2004	Small Claims	Melinda Fehlers	TV film
2005	Hell Has Harbour Views	Jill Bishop	TV film
2006	All Saints	Annie / Felicity	Episode: "Mind Games"
2007	Them	Tara Spader	Unsold TV pilot
2008	Valentine's Day	Mel	TV film
2009	Dirt Game	Megan Kerr	Main role
2010	Sea Patrol	Caroline Taylor	Episode: "Night of the Long Knives"
2010	Rush	Lily Kronin	Episode: "3.13"
2011	Underbelly Files: The Man Who Got Away	Andrea Pascoe	TV film
2011–12	Neighbours	Emilia Jovanovic	Recurring role
2012	Mrs Biggs	Julie Flower	TV miniseries
2012–13, 2016	Offspring	Jodie Ellis	Episodes: "Chaos", "The Bond Between Sisters", "A Present from the Past"
2013	Better Man	Nicole Cleary	Episode: "Twin Dragons"
2013	Miss Fisher's Murder Mysteries	Genevieve Lamaire	Episode: " Murder à la Mode"
2014	INXS: Never Tear Us Apart	Kim D	TV miniseries
2014	The Doctor Blake Mysteries	Sarah Alexander	Episode: "Smoke and Mirrors"
2016	Please Like Me	Kyah	Episodes: "Burrito Bowl", "Souvlaki"
2017	Newton's Law	Rose Newton	Episodes: "External Forces", "Terminal Velocity", "Equal and Opposite Forces"
2017	Seven Types of Ambiguity	Greta	Episode: "Mitch"
2017	Sunshine	Freya Messina	TV miniseries
2019	Glitch	Amy	Episode: "Quintessence"
2021	Five Bedrooms	Midwife Shauna	2 episodes
2021	New Gold Mountain	Rosie	2 episodes
2023	Scrublands	Monica Piccini	2 episodes
2024	Fake	Tessa Rain	1 episode
