= John Herbert House =

Historic house in Tennessee, United States

- U.S. National Register of Historic Places
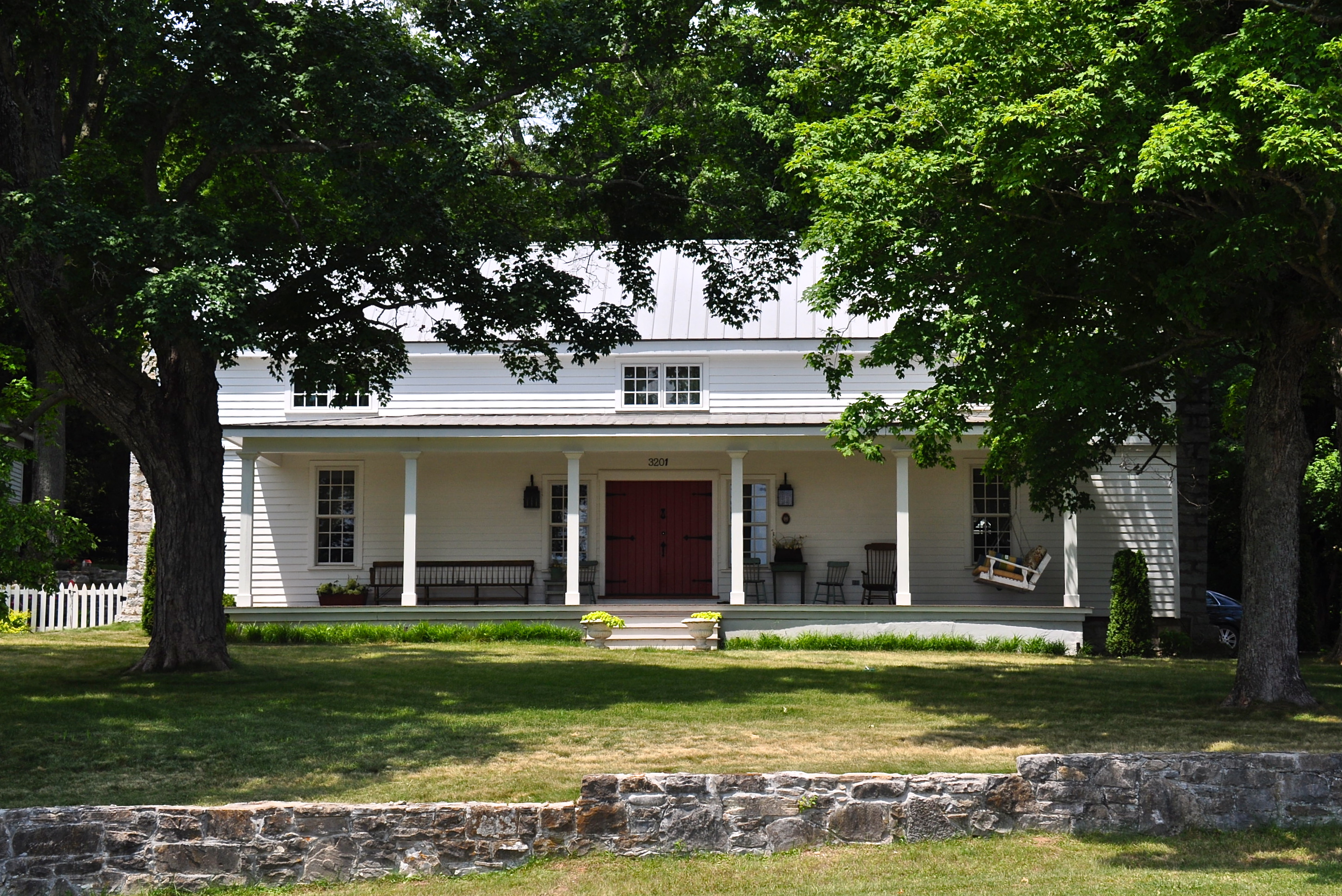
- John Herbert House, July 2014.

- Location within Tennessee Location within the United States
- Location: Clovercroft Rd. 3/4 mi. E of Wilson Pike, Franklin, Tennessee
- Coordinates: 35°55′51″N 86°45′21″W
- Area: 5.5 acres (2.2 ha)
- Built: c. 1830 and c. 1910
- Architectural style: Double pen dogtrot log cabin
- MPS: Williamson County MRA
- NRHP reference No.: 88000278
- Added to NRHP: April 13, 1988

The John Herbert House, also known as Breezeway, is a property in Franklin, Tennessee, United States, that was listed on the National Register of Historic Places in 1988. A 1988 study of historic resources in Williamson County identified the Herbert house as one of the "best examples", along with the Beasley-Parham House, of double pen dogtrot houses in the county: "Both houses were built with two log pens joined by an open breezeway or dogtrot and each pen has an exterior chimney. Both residences had the breezeways enclosed with weatherboard siding by the end of the 19th century. The original form and plan of the double pen dogtrot style is evident in both residences."

It was built, remodelled, or has other significance in c.1830 and c.1910. It includes double pen and Dogtrot architecture. When listed the property included three contributing buildings on an area of 5.5 acres (2.2 ha).

The property is denoted as Williamson County historic resource WM-152.
