= Ruisseau de la Brasserie =

Brewery Creek Ruisseau de la Brasserie
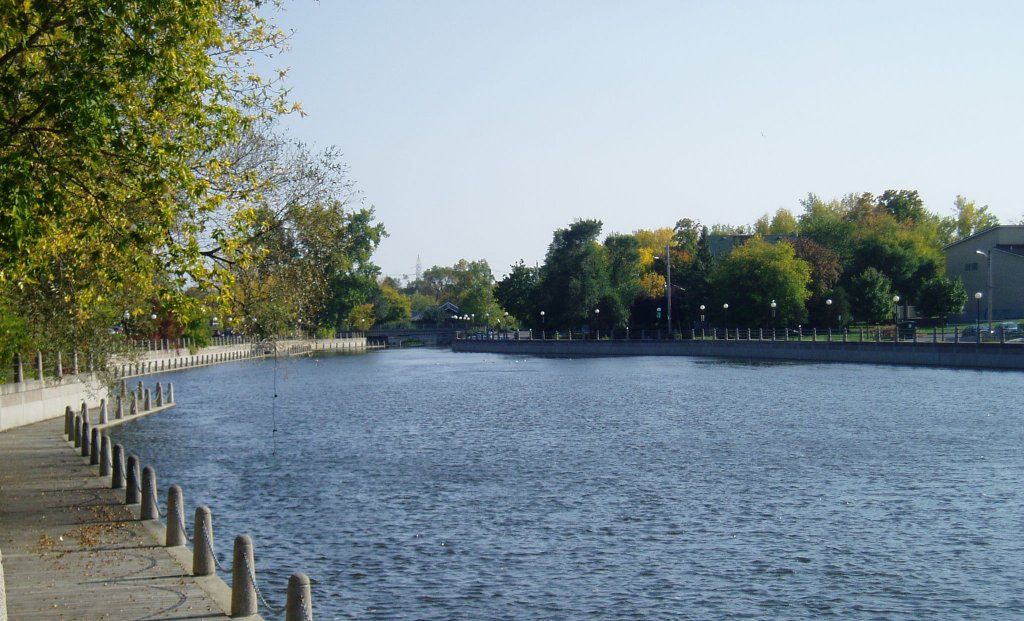
- Brewery Creek south of the Montcalm Bridge

- Location of mouth

Location
- Country: Canada
- Province: Quebec

Physical characteristics
- Mouth
  - coordinates: 45.4247°N 75.7246°W

Basin features
- River system: Ottawa River

Brewery Creek (Officially known by its French name, Ruisseau de la Brasserie) is a small creek that forms the northern and western shores of Île Hull. It circles the downtown of the Hull sector, of Gatineau, Quebec. It runs from the Ottawa River just west of downtown Hull. Running west of Montcalm Street it turns east north of the highway, running up to Jacques Cartier Park where it rejoins the Ottawa River. In the 1980s the area was refurbished by the National Capital Commission. The former water works on a small island in the creek became the Théâtre de l'Île and the Montcalm Street Bridge was replaced by the ornate Tour Eiffel Bridge. Its pollution removed, it has become a popular location for birders.

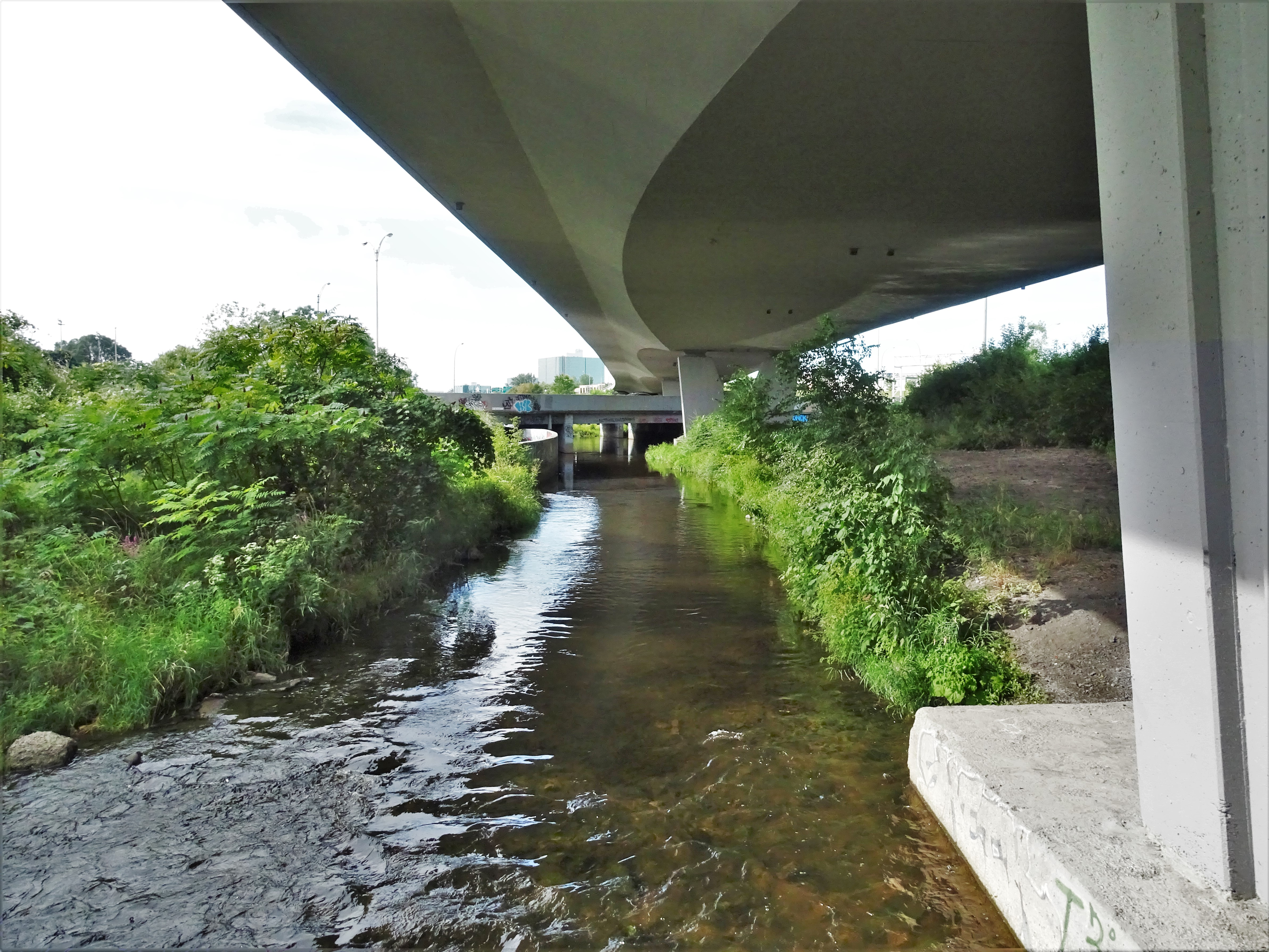
Ruisseau de la Brasserie flowing underneath Autoroute 5 and Autoroute 50 in Hull.

== History ==
Not long after Wright's Town, Lower Canada was founded by Philemon Wright in 1800, a large brewery was built and began operations in 1813 on the banks of this creek. It was located at the southeast corner of Columbia Farm that itself had been cleared in 1811 and completed in 1823. Columbia Farm was first managed by Philemon Jr., and by 1823 it was managed by Thomas Brigham, who had married Philemon's daughter Abigail. The farm was bequeathed to Thomas and Abigail in 1839, at Philemon's death.

The Brewery was the second major (long-operating) brewery in Lower Canada, the first having been built by John Molson in Montreal - Molson was a friend and associate and Philemon was the first to have sold hops to John Molson in 1796.

In 1822, the Wright Brewery became a rum distillery as well. By 1828, 2 distilleries and 1 Brewery were operating in the Township of Hull and another distillery was operating just across the Gatineau River, at Tiberius Wright's Gatenoe Falls Farm in the Township of Templeton.

The creek has had more than one name in its history, being called Brewery Creek, Brigham Creek and Ruisseau de la Brasserie.
