= Théâtre de l'Île =

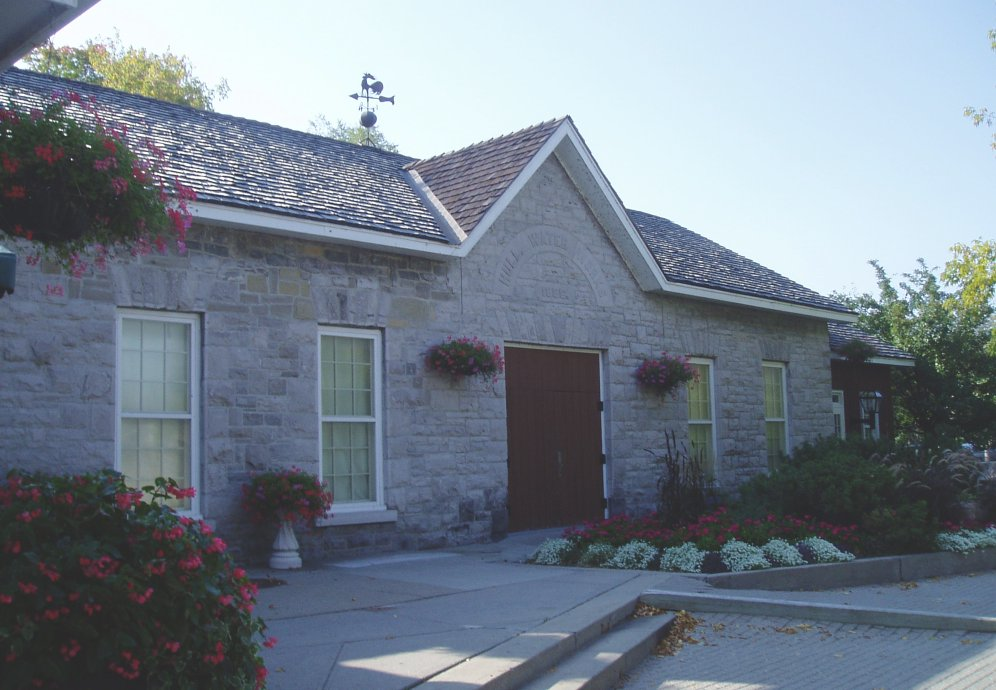
- The Théâtre de l'Île in the former waterworks in the Hull sector
- Interactive map of Théâtre de l'Île
- Former names: Hull Water Works (1886–1974)
- Address: 1, rue Wellington; Gatineau, Quebec; J8X 2H3
- Coordinates: 45.425501°N 75.724656°W
- Owner: Ville de Gatineau
- Capacity: 119
- Type: Theatre

Construction
- Built: 1886
- Opened: January 11, 1974
- Years active: 1974–present

Website
- www.ovation.qc.ca/gatineau/theatredelile/

The Théâtre de l'Île (Theatre of the Island) is a small municipally run theatre in Gatineau, Quebec, Canada. It is located on a small island at the southern end of the Ruisseau de la Brasserie, a small river running just to the west of Montcalm Street in the former city of Hull. The building was originally constructed in 1886 as the Hull Water Works, at a time when the site was at the heart of a largely industrial area. In the subsequent decades the building served a number of different purposes. In 1974, it suffered a devastating fire. The city of Hull and the National Capital Commission joined together to rebuild the structure as a theatre. It opened in 1976, and was the first municipally run theatre in Quebec.

The theatre seats up to 119. It puts on a number of different shows per year, with some 25,000 spectators per annum.
