= Hell Has Harbour Views =

Film directed by Peter Duncan

- Based on: Hell Has Harbour Views by Richard Beasley
- Written by: Peter Duncan
- Directed by: Peter Duncan
- Starring: Roy Billing; Marta Dusseldorp; Steve Bisley; Simon Chilvers; Matt Day; Lisa McCune; Peter O'Brien
- Theme music composer: Nigel Westlake
- Country of origin: Australia
- Original language: English

Production
- Producers: Ian Collie; Prue Fletcher
- Cinematography: Geoff Burton
- Editor: Simon Martin
- Running time: 105 minutes

Original release
- Release: 30 January 2005

Hell Has Harbour Views is a 2005 Australian television movie starring Matt Day and Lisa McCune. It was written and directed by Peter Duncan, based on the 2001 novel of the same name by Richard Beasley.

Beasley began writing the novel while working at a small law firm and has stated that it is based on several stories and people. It was first published in Australia through Pan Macmillan and has been published in print and ebook formats.

The film was nominated for "best miniseries or telemovie" at both the AFI Awards and the Logie Awards, losing to The Incredible Journey of Mary Bryant at both; and for two additional AFI Awards and an additional Logie Award, all of which it lost to Love My Way.

== Synopsis ==
While successful and primed to continue ascending the company ladder, attorney Hugh Walker is guilt stricken by the people he and his company have hurt along the way. During a large case he meets the journalist Caroline and the two begin seeing each other, despite the fact that Hugh already has a girlfriend, Helen. Things grow more tense after he witnesses a sexual encounter in the office, placing him in the middle of office strife.

== Cast ==
- Matt Day as Hugh Walker
- Lisa McCune as Caroline Ashton
- Marta Dusseldorp as Helen
- Tony Llewellyn-Jones as John Diplock
- Peter O'Brien as Tim Sullivan
- Steve Bisley as Bruce Kent
- Kris McQuade as Pam
- Frank Whitten as Giles Taffy QC
- Freya Stafford as Jill Bishop
- Abigail Bianca as Sarah
- David Field as Greg Hogan
- Roy Billing as Kevin Fields
- Tiriel Mora as Rob Carney
- Simon Chilvers as George Hancock
- Tony Barry as Frank Flannery
- Heather Mitchell as Anne

== Reception ==
The Sydney Morning Herald reviewed Hell Has Harbour Views, stating that it "never sets out to be Australian with a big A but it is sure to be a hot-ticket item with overseas buyers". The Age compared it favorably to other movies aired by ABC, as they felt that "After the bitter disappointments of recent ABC drama, Aunty has delivered the goods in this stylish and witty telemovie about one man's search for his soul in, of all places, the country's largest law firm."

=== Awards ===
- AWGIE Awards (2005, won)
