= Vin Beasley =

Australian cyclist (1935–2002)

Personal information
- Full name: Vin Beasley
- Born: 1 January 1935
- Died: 19 November 2002 (aged 67)

Cycling career
- Sport: Cycling
- Role: Rider

Vin Beasley (1 January 1935 – 19 November 2002) was an Australian racing cyclist. He was part of a family of Footscray cyclists, the son of Jack Beasley, brother of Clinton Beasley and John Beasley and father of Vin Beasley Jr. He won the Melbourne to Warrnambool Classic in 1952.
