= Belsey =

Belsey is a surname. Notable people with the surname include:

- Bill Belsey, Canadian politician
- Catherine Belsey (1940–2021), British literary critic and academic
- Hugh Belsey (born 1954), British art historian
- Ian Belsey, lyric baritone
- Belsey family in On Beauty

== See also ==
- Besley, a surname
- Belsay, Northumberland, England
