= Confederation Boulevard =

Route in Canada's National Capital Region

Coordinates: 45.42458°N 75.69564°W

Confederation Boulevard (French: Boulevard de la Confédération) is a "ceremonial and discovery route" in Canada's National Capital Region, running through Parliament Hill and encompassing downtown areas in Ottawa and Gatineau. Some of Canada's most important institutions and landmarks lie along its route. During state visits, Confederation Boulevard is toured by foreign dignitaries. On Canada Day, much of Confederation Boulevard is closed to cars. Confederation Boulevard is an initiative of the National Capital Commission (NCC).

The route's name commemorates Canadian Confederation.

== Design ==
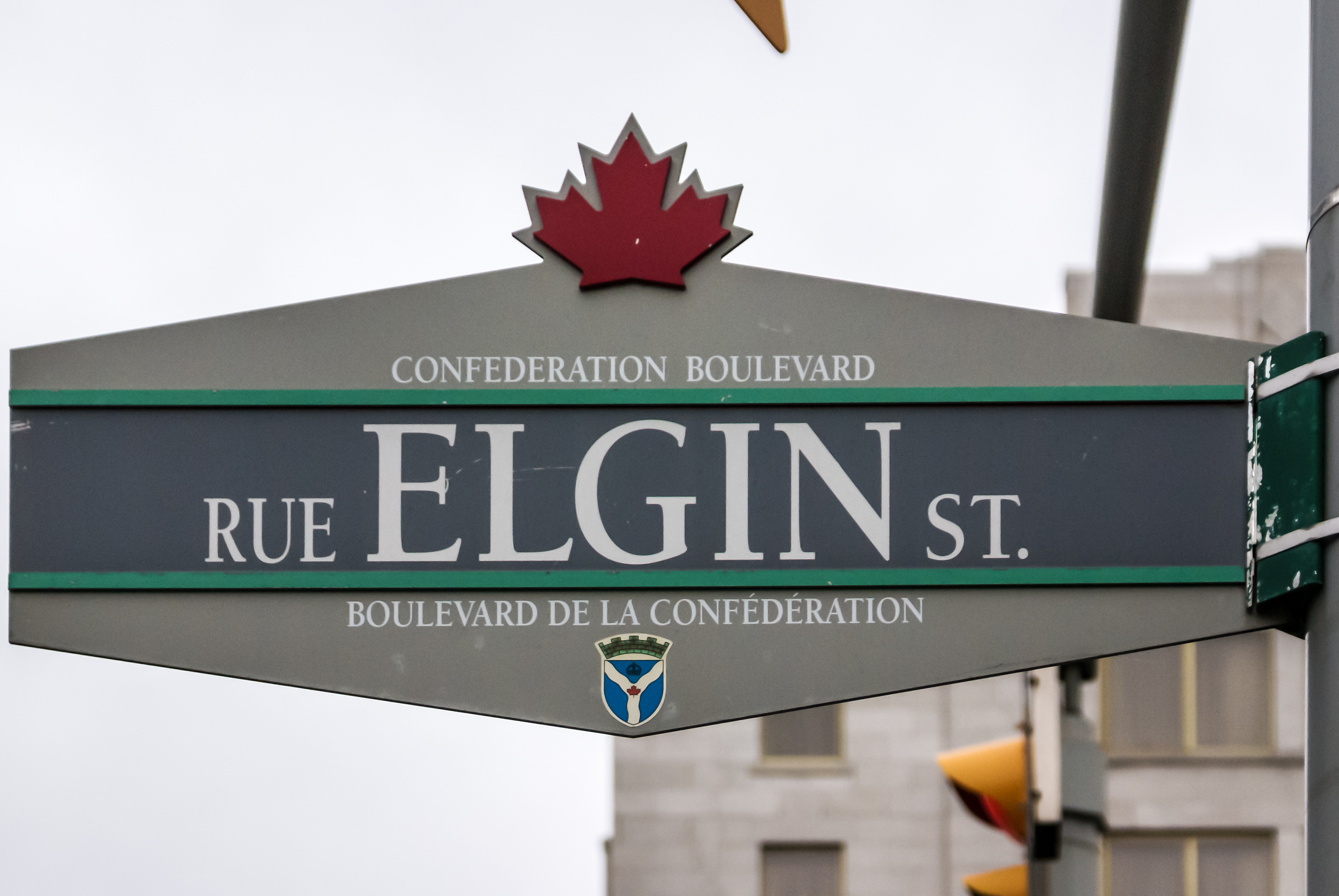
Example of a street sign on Confederation Boulevard

Confederation Boulevard is a collection of several streets in Ottawa and Gatineau, forming a loop with several spurs. In order to connect these streets visually, urban designers employed the use of consistent street paving (using pink Canadian granite), lampposts adorned with bronze maple leaves, and distinctive street furniture. Along the route, art exhibits and interpretation panels can also be found. Opposite sides of the Boulevard were designed somewhat differently to emphasize the relationship between the "Town" (normal urban space) and the "Crown" (federal government space).

The NCC created annual Confederation Boulevard banners display in 1992 for Canada's 125th birthday celebrations and the development of Confederation Boulevard. Since then, the NCC has commemorated important anniversaries and milestones in Canada's history with banners on the boulevard, including the 400th anniversary of Acadia (2004), the Year of the Veteran and the centenaries of Alberta and Saskatchewan (2005), the 150th anniversary of the Canadian Museum of Civilization (2006), and the 100th Anniversary of Parks Canada (2011).

== Attractions ==
- 24 Sussex Drive (the official residence of the Prime Minister of Canada)
- Byward Market
- Canadian Museum of History
- Confederation Park
- National War Memorial (Canada)
- Garden of the Provinces
- National Gallery of Canada
- National Arts Centre
- Parliament Hill
- Rideau Hall (the official residence of the Governor General of Canada)
- Royal Canadian Mint
- Supreme Court of Canada

== Awards ==
Honours for Confederation Boulevard include an award from the American Society of Landscape Architects and the Award of Honour from the Canadian Society of Landscape Architects.
