= Beesly =

Beesly is a surname. Notable people with the surname include:

- Edward Spencer Beesly (1831–1915), English positivist and historian
- Richard Beesly (1907–1965), British rower
- Patrick Beesly (1913–1986), British author and intelligence officer during World War II

== Fictional ==
- Pam Beesly, a fictional character on the U.S. television sitcom The Office

== See also ==
- Beasley
- Beazley
- Beesley
- Besley
