= Beasley Building =

- U.S. National Register of Historic Places
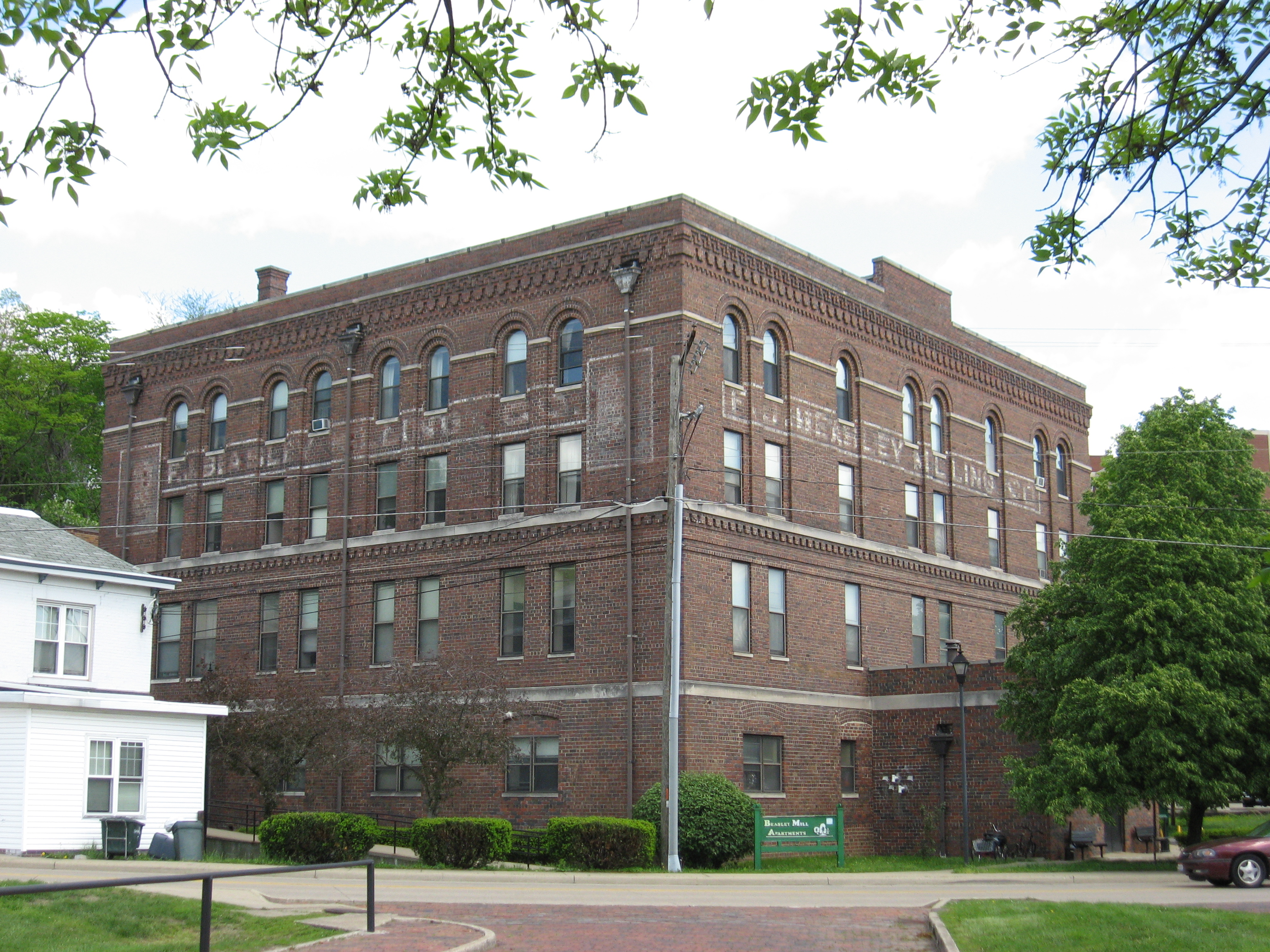
- Two sides of the building

- Location within Ohio Location within the United States
- Location: 93 W. Union St., Athens, Ohio
- Coordinates: 39°19′43″N 82°6′18″W
- Area: Less than 1 acre (0.40 ha)
- Built: 1905
- NRHP reference No.: 82001358
- Added to NRHP: October 7, 1982

The Beasley Building is a historic commercial building in downtown Athens, Ohio, United States. Constructed at the turn of the 20th century, this industrial building has been named a historic site.

Built of brick with elements of iron, the Beasley Building is a three-story structure with a five-bay facade. Each bay features paired Romanesque Revival windows above a beltcourse with cornice, while an entablature of geometric shapes surrounds the building near its roofline. Upon its construction, the building was intended to convey a sense of architectural balance, contrasting the two-story height of the main windows with the beltcourse and frieze, as well as a sense of pure massiveness.

Situated in downtown Athens, the Beasley Building lies within an area that has served as Athens' commercial center since the community's founding. Substantial industry in the area began in 1840 when the Hocking Canal was constructed through the area, and the coming of the Scioto and Hocking Valley Railroad in 1855 expanded its commercial importance. Charles Higgins, a local miller, was one of the partners in the firm of Eldridge and Higgins, which bought the building's site in 1904 and began construction, although it was then purchased by Frank Beasley, a prominent miller from nearby Amesville. His firm eventually turned the Beasley Building into the region's largest gristmill powered by electricity, although it eventually closed and was converted for grocery purposes.

Late in 1982, the Beasley Building was listed on the National Register of Historic Places, qualifying both because of its architecture and its place in the area's history. One year later, the building was awarded approximately $1.1 million in federal rehabilitation tax credits.

Currently, the Beasley Building is configured with residential apartments, focused on providing affordable, income-assisted senior housing, operating under the name Beasley Mill.
