= Colin Beesley =

English footballer

Personal information
- Date of birth: 9 October 1951 (age 75)
- Place of birth: Stockton-on-Tees, England
- Position: Winger

Senior career*
Years	Team	Apps	(Gls)
1969	Sunderland	3	(0)
- * Club domestic league appearances and goals

Colin Beesley (born 6 October 1951) is an English former professional footballer who played as a winger for Sunderland.
