= John Beasley (cyclist) =

Australian cyclist (1930–2017)

Personal information
- Full name: John Beasley
- Born: 30 July 1930 Footscray, Victoria
- Died: 31 January 2017 (aged 86)

Cycling career
- Sport: Cycling
- Role: Rider

John Beasley (13 July 1930 – 31 January 2017) was an Australian racing cyclist and rode in the 1952 and 1955 Tour de France.

== Major results ==
1950
1st Melbourne to Wangaratta 173 mi (278 km) race
1st Victorian 150 mile Champion (in the Melbourne to Warrnambool Classic race)
1951
1st Melbourne to Wangaratta 172 mi (277 km) race
1st stage 3 Tour of the West, NSW
1st general classification Tour of the West, NSW
1st Australian national road race title
1952
28th Paris–Nice
Tour de France rider
1st Stage 6 'Sun' Tour of Victoria
4th General Classification 'Sun' Tour of Victoria
1954
6th General Classification Tour of South Australia
2nd in Goulburn to Sydney Classic
1st Stage 1 Sydney to Melbourne
1955
Tour de France rider
1961
8th General Classification Tour of Tasmania
1st Wonthaggi 140 mile Handicap Race

== Background ==
Beasley was born on 13 July 1930 in Footscray, Victoria. He was the son of John Joseph "Jack" Beasley who was a leading rider in the 1920s. His brothers Clinton and Vin and sons John and Russell have made significant contributions to the sport.

== Australian professional cycling career ==
In 1947, he started professional cycle racing as 17 year old and as a result never raced as an amateur. In 1951 the Sporting Globe organised a public fundraising scheme to help send Beasley, Dean Whitehorn, Peter Anthony, and Eddie Smith to Europe to race. In 1952, he raced in the Paris–Nice race and finished 28th. He subsequently was offered a contact by the Luxembourg international team and raced in the 1952 Tour de France. He was eliminated from the race after Stage 2 after having a fall and mechanical problems. In 1955 Tour de France, Beasley and fellow Australian Russell Mockridge were part of the Luxembourg international team. Beasley withdrew after Stage 3 after suffering the effects of food poisoning after a seafood meal in Le Havre just prior to the race.

In 1951 Beasley rode in the Tour of the West, a five-stage race over 623.5 miles (1,003.4 km) in the Hartley Team with Clinton Beasley, and Keith and Max Rowley. John won stage 3 and the general classification.

Beasley retired in 1961 after winning the Wonthaggi 140 mile Handicap Race. In 1961, he took over running the family business Beasley Cycles in Footscray, Victoria after his father died. He was a mechanic for the Australian teams at 1982 Commonwealth Games and 1984 Los Angeles Olympics.

In 2000, he was awarded the Australian Sports Medal.
