= Jack Beasley (footballer) =

English footballer (1916–1982)

Personal information
- Full name: John Beasley
- Date of birth: 7 February 1916
- Place of birth: Wednesbury, England
- Date of death: 1982 (aged 65–66)
- Position: Centre forward

Senior career*
Years	Team	Apps	(Gls)
19??–1935	Birmingham	0	(0)
1935–1936	Torquay United	4	(2)
1936–1937	Worcester City		(35)
1938–19??	Halesowen Town		
- * Club domestic league appearances and goals

John Beasley (7 February 1916 – 1982), generally known as Jack Beasley, was an English professional footballer who played as a centre forward.

== Career ==
Beasley began his professional career with Birmingham, but left to join Torquay United in 1935 without making the first team. He scored on his league debut on 18 January 1936, a 2–1 win at home to Watford, Torquay's other goal coming from Fred Beedall.

He played in the following two games, a 2–0 defeat away to Bristol City and a 3–1 defeat at home to Millwall in which he scored Torquay's goal. Despite scoring he was replaced by Wally Hunt for the next game. He made one further appearance, on 14 April 1936 in a 3–0 defeat away to Bristol Rovers, before leaving for non-league Worcester City, for whom he scored 43 goals in league and cup. He later played for Halesowen Town, signing for them in 1938, when he was noted as being a resident of the town.

== Personal life ==
Beasley was born in Wednesbury on 7 February 1916. He married Agnes Mary Coley on 3 October 1937. He died in 1982.
