= Alfred Beesley =

English topographer and poet

Alfred Beesley (/ˈbiːzli/; 1800 – 10 April 1847) was an English topographer and poet.

He was an apprentice to a watchmaker at Deddington, Oxfordshire, but only served a portion of his time, and subsequently devoted himself to literary and scientific pursuits. He died on 10 April 1847, and was buried in Banbury churchyard. He published a collection of poems, and 'The History of Banbury, including copious historical and antiquarian notices' in 1841 in 8 volumes.
