= Craig-Beasley House =

Historic house in Tennessee, United States

- U.S. National Register of Historic Places
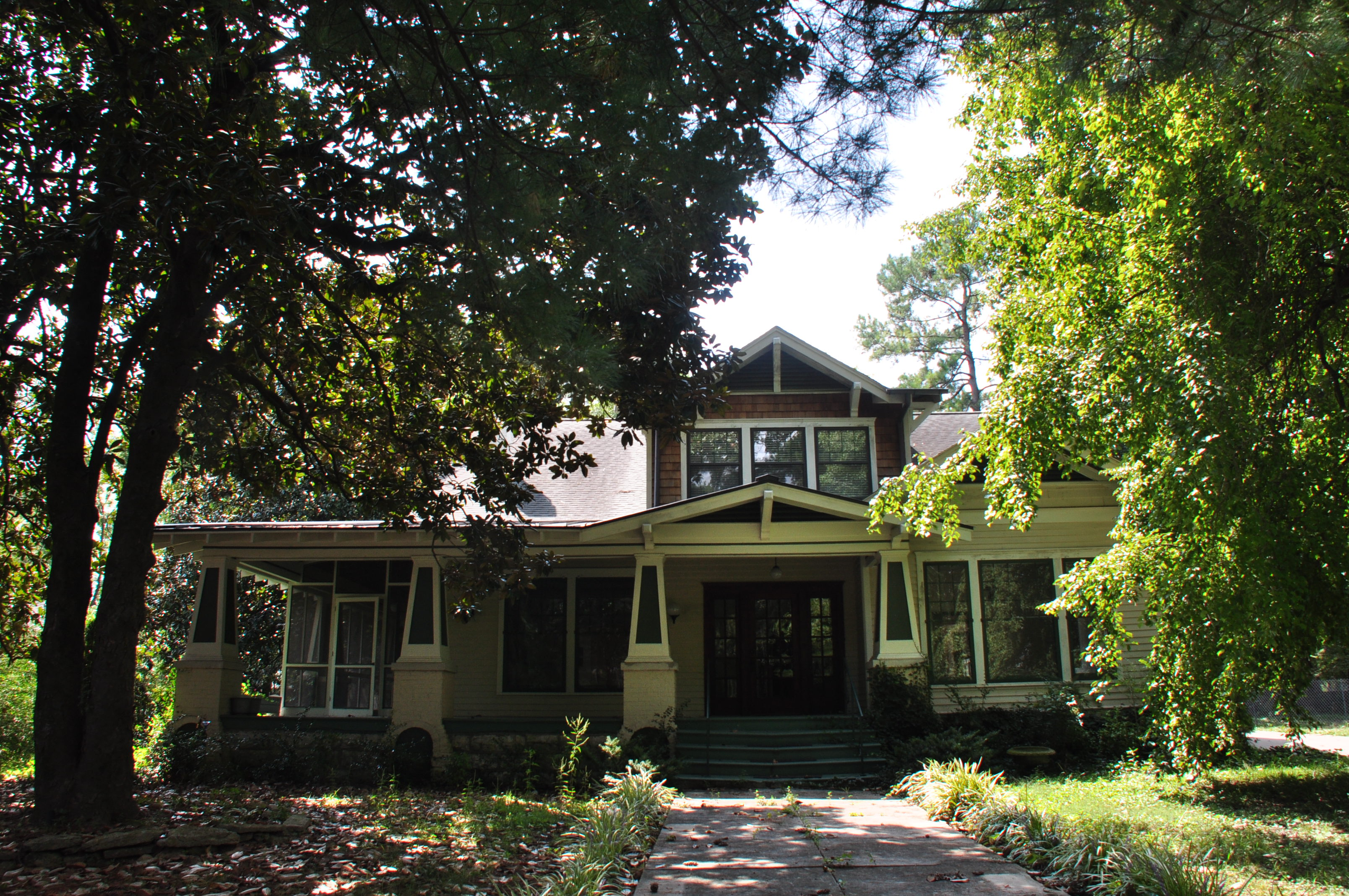
- Craig-Beasley House in 2014

- Location within Tennessee Location within the United States
- Location: 503 Boyd Mill Ave., Franklin, Tennessee
- Coordinates: 35°55′22″N 86°52′54″W
- Area: 2.9 acres (1.2 ha)
- Built: 1916 and 1953
- Architectural style: Bungalow/Craftsman
- NRHP reference No.: 03001342
- Added to NRHP: December 23, 2003

The Craig-Beasley House, also known as Gaines House, is a 2.9-acre (1.2 ha) property in Franklin, Tennessee that was listed on the National Register of Historic Places in 2003. The listing includes four contributing buildings: a 1916-built American Craftsman-style house and compatible 1953-built outbuildings (a garage/greenhouse, a stable, and a storage shed).

It is believed that the house was designed and built by local lumber mill owner and builder J.F. Craig.
