= Beazley =

Beazley is an English surname. Notable people with the surname include:

- Charles Raymond Beazley (1868–1955), British historian
- Christopher Beazley (born 1952), British politician
- David M. Beazley, American software engineer
- John Beazley (1885–1970), British classical scholar
- Johnny Beazley (1918–1990), American baseball player
- Hannah Beazley, Australian politician, daughter of Kim Beazley
- Kim Beazley (born 1948), Australian politician, son of Kim Beazley Sr.
- Kim Beazley Sr (1917–2007), Australian politician
- Margaret Beazley (born 1951), Australian jurist
- Napoleon Beazley (1976–2002), convicted murderer
- Risdon Beazley (1904–1979), marine salvage operator

== See also ==
- Miss Beazley (character), a fictional character in Archie comics
- Miss Beazley, a dog belonging to George and Laura Bush
- Beazley plc, a British insurance company
- Beazley Medal, a Western Australian school award
- G. A. Beazeley (1870–1961), a British army officer and surveyor
- Beasley (surname)
- Beesley, surname
- Beesly, surname
- Besley, surname
