= Justice Beasley =

Justice Beasley may refer to:

- Cheri Beasley (born 1966), associate justice of the North Carolina Supreme Court
- Mercer Beasley (1815–1897), chief justice of the New Jersey Supreme Court
