= Besley =

Besley is a surname. Notable people with the surname include:

- Kirkland Besley (1902–1994), American hospital administrator and football player
- Robert Besley (1794–1876), English typographer and Lord Mayor of London
  - Besley Clarendon, a typeface designed by Besley
- Tina Besley, New Zealand education academic

== See also ==
- Beasley (disambiguation)
- Beazley
- Beesley
- Beesly
- Belsey, a surname
- Edmund Besley Court Kennedy (1818–1848), English explorer in Australia
