= Bijli =

Bijli may refer to:

- Bijli is also the name of a village in Chhattisgarh, India. Its population is mainly Halba and Gondi people, though it also contains three or four sub-tribes.
- Ajay Bijli, Indian film maker and owner of PVR Cinemas and PVR Pictures
