= John Beasley (cycling coach) =

- Beasley at the 2018–19 UCI Track Cycling World Cup in Berlin
- Born: Australia
- Citizenship: Malaysian permanent resident (since 2024)
- Occupation: Track cycling coach
- Known for: Coaching the Malaysian national track cycling team
- Father: John Beasley (cyclist)

John Beasley is an Australian track cycling coach who formerly served as head coach of Malaysia's national sprint cycling program from 2006 to 2024, and as technical director of the Malaysia National Cycling Federation from 2025 to October 2026. He is most notable for coaching national cyclist Azizulhasni Awang, who won a world title in the keirin in 2017 and Olympic keirin medals in 2016 and 2021. Other notable cyclists under his leadership included Josiah Ng, Fatehah Mustapa, Shah Firdaus Sahrom and Nurul Izzah Izzati Asri.

== Early life ==
Beasley was born into an Australian family with a long history in competitive cycling. His father, John Beasley Sr, competed in the Tour de France in 1952 and 1955. His grandfather, John Joseph "Jack" Beasley, was also a competitive cyclist and founded the family's bicycle business, Beasley Cycles, in Australia.

== Coaching career ==
Beasley joined the Malaysian coaching staff on 1 January 2006, after being approached by Malaysian track cyclist Josiah Ng. With limited training facilities locally, he established Melbourne as a training base for the team to train and compete against experienced international cyslists. The program initially focused on track sprinting events, including the keirin.

Under the program, Malaysian cyclists achieved improved results in international sprint competitions. The squad had achieved results at the Asian Games and Asian Cycling Championships. Rizal Tisin had secured an Asian Championship gold medal, ending a 24-year gap in Malaysian victories at that level. Josiah Ng subsequently won gold in the men's keirin at the 2010 Commonwealth Games in New Delhi. Azizulhasni Awang also won the gold medal in the men's keirin at the 2017 UCI Track Cycling World Championships, bronze medal at the 2016 Summer Olympics in Rio de Janeiro and silver medal at the 2020 Summer Olympics in Tokyo, held in 2021. Azizulhasni was Malaysia's first world champion in track cycling.

Beasley took up the technical director position in 2025, following his 19-year tenure as national sprint head coach. In this role, he frequently expressed frustration with aspects of Malaysian cycling administration, raising concerns about the coordination of national and state-level cycling programmes, disagreements over athlete selection and the release of riders for international competitions.

In August 2026, Beasley submitted his resignation, with his service scheduled to conclude on 31 October 2026. His final assignment with Malaysia was the 2026 UCI Track Cycling World Championships in Shanghai.

Beasley will join the Japanese national team in preparation for the 2028 Olympic Games.

== Personal life ==
After years of service to Malaysia's national cycling team, Beasley received Malaysian permanent resident status in July 2024.

Beasley is married to Vicki Beasley, also a former competitive cyclist and cycling coach.

== See also ==
- Malaysia at the Olympics
- Azizulhasni Awang
- Josiah Ng
- Shah Firdaus Sahrom
- Nurul Izzah Izzati Mohd Asri
