= Larry Beasley =

Canadian urban planner

Larry Beasley, CM (born 12 May 1948) is an internationally known urban planner. Formerly Co-director of Planning for the City Of Vancouver in British Columbia, Canada, he is largely credited with the transformation of its downtown core along New Urbanism lines, known as Vancouverism or "The Vancouver Model".

== Career ==
Beasley moved to Vancouver in 1968. He worked as a neighbourhood planner, overseeing large developments in the 1990s and 2000s.

In 2004, he was made a Member of the Order of Canada in recognition for having "played a leading role in transforming" Vancouver's "downtown core into a vibrant, livable urban community". Since retiring from public service, Beasley has been engaged in community initiatives, including the Institute for Canadian Citizenship, an organization created by former Governor General Adrienne Clarkson following her term of office. At that time he became chair of the National Capital Commission's advisory committee on planning, design and realty in Ottawa, and held that position until 2016.

In September 2009 Larry Beasley was invited to Rotterdam as a guest urban critic by the Van der Leeuwkring, a group of Rotterdam-based project developers aiming to make public life benefit from their private investments. Beasley gives talks internationally about the urban planning, and has also provided planning advice to the Abu Dhabi government.

With Jonathan Barnett he co-authored the book Ecodesign for Cities and Suburbs published in 2015 by Island Press.

Beasley was a professor at University of British Columbia's School of Community and Regional Planning.

In 2017 Beasley was hired by the city of Brampton, Ontario, to develop a plan for future development of the sprawling metropolis. A year later, he published a 100-page document describing his vision of Brampton in 2040.
