= Beasley-Parham House =

Historic house in Tennessee, United States

- U.S. National Register of Historic Places
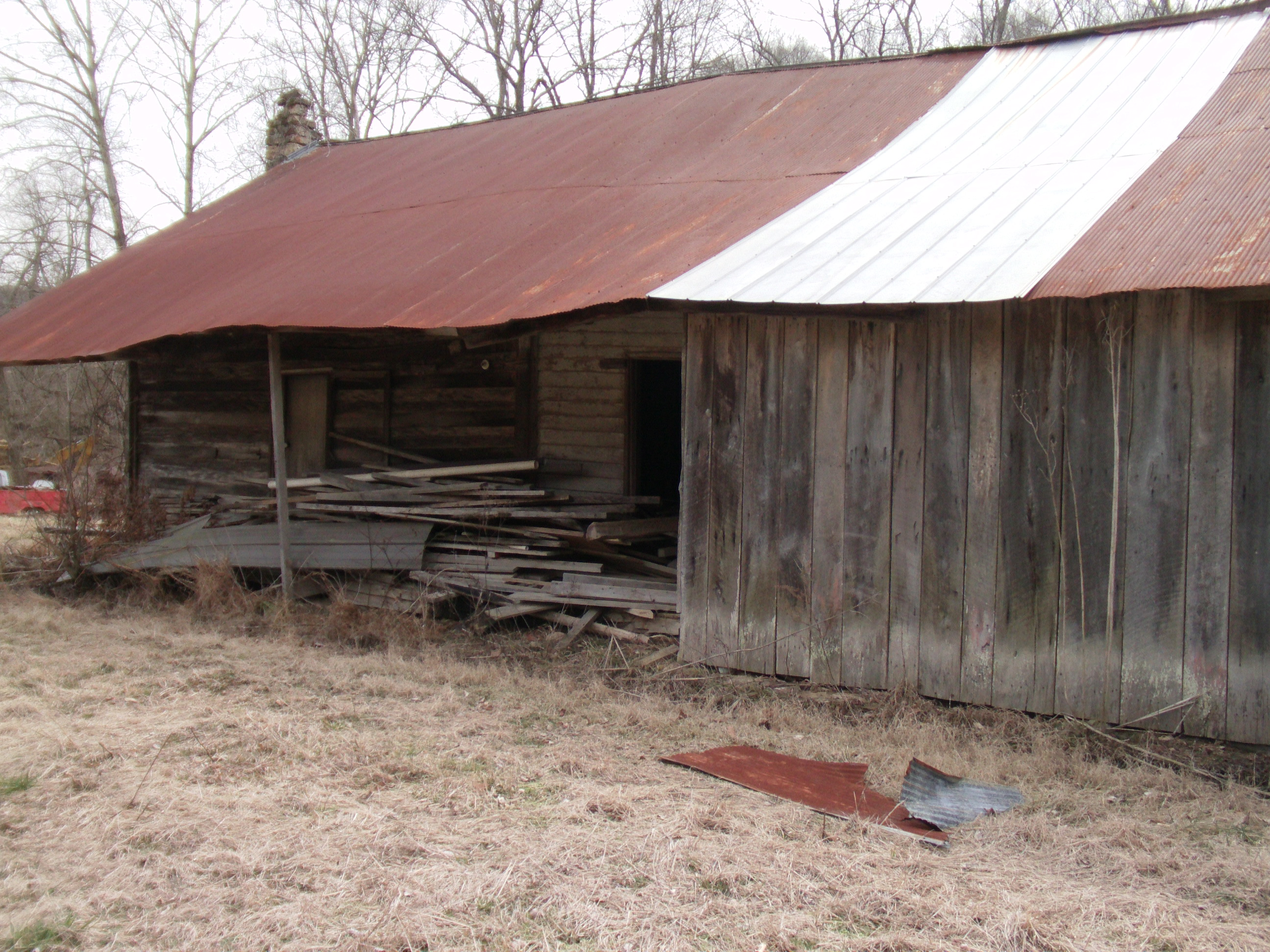

- Location within Tennessee Location within the United States
- Nearest city: Greenbrier, Tennessee
- Coordinates: 35°50′19″N 87°6′48″W
- Area: 1.8 acres (0.73 ha)
- Built: c. 1840 and c. 1880
- Architectural style: Greek Revival, Double pen dogtrot
- MPS: Williamson County MRA
- NRHP reference No.: 88000286
- Added to NRHP: April 13, 1988

The Beasley-Parham House is located in the vicinity of Greenbrier, Tennessee, United States. The house is a double pen dogtrot design, consisting of two log pens, each with an exterior chimney, that were originally connected by an open breezeway (the "dogtrot"). The breezeway was enclosed with siding some time before the end of the 19th century.

It was listed on the National Register of Historic Places in 1988. When listed the property included two contributing buildings, and four contributing structures on 1.8 acres (0.73 ha).
