= Richard Lee Beasley =

American politician

Member of the South Carolina House of Representatives
- In office 1960–1966

Personal details
- Born: 1930
- Died: December 28, 2012 (aged 82) Darlington, South Carolina, U.S.
- Children: David Beasley

Richard Lee Beasley (1930 – December 28, 2012) was an American politician. Beasley was the father of former Governor of South Carolina David Beasley and was chairman of a bank. He served in the South Carolina House of Representatives from 1960 to 1966.
