= Richard Beasley (author) =

Australian author and barrister

- Born: 1964 (age 61–62); Sydney, New South Wales
- Education: University of Adelaide; University of Sydney
- Occupations: Author, barrister
- Children: 2
- Writing career
- Notable works: Hell Has Harbour Views; Me and Rory Macbeath; Cyanide Games; Dead in the Water

Richard Beasley (born 1964) is an Australian barrister, novelist and nonfiction writer.

== Early life and legal career ==
Richard Beasley SC was born in Sydney, but grew up in Adelaide, South Australia. He completed undergraduate studies in law at the University of Adelaide and worked at Duncan Groom and Hannon which was a law firm affiliated with the ALP. He moved to Sydney in 1992, where he completed postgraduate studies at the University of Sydney. He worked as a solicitor until 1997. He was admitted as a barrister at the NSW Bar in 1997, and was made a 'Silk' in 2011. From January 2018 to February 2019, he was Senior Counsel Assisting the Murray Darling Basin Royal Commission, and in 2020 was Senior Counsel Assisting the Ruby Princess Special Commission of Inquiry. Since 2016, he has been the Presiding Member of the New South Wales Racing Appeal Panel.

== Writing career ==
Beasley is also the author of five novels and one non-fiction book. The first two are Hell Has Harbour Views (2001) and The Ambulance Chaser (2004). The books are both set in Sydney, and are about corrupt global law firms and insurance companies respectively. Hell Has Harbour Views was adapted as a television film, and first aired on Australian ABC TV in 2005. It starred Lisa McCune and Matt Day, and was written and directed by Peter Duncan (Rake). Hell Has Harbour Views has been reprinted a number of times, most recently in January 2019 (Simon & Schuster).

His third novel Me and Rory Macbeath (Hachette, 2013) is set in Adelaide, South Australia and is a story of friendship of two young boys, one of which lives in a household wrecked by domestic violence, and the killing of one of the boys parents. The novel was described as "heart-wrenching and unforgettable" by author Anne Summers.

His fourth novel Cyanide Games (2016, Simon & Schuster) is the first of the Peter Tanner Thriller series. It was followed by The Burden of Lies (2017). Both novels have received favourable reviews in The Sydney Morning Herald.

His first work of non-fiction, Dead in the Water (Allen & Unwin), published in early 2021, concerns the illegality and maladministration of Australia's most important environmental law, the Commonwealth Water Act, and the Murray Darling Basin Plan.
