= National Capital Commission =

Crown corporation of the Government of Canada

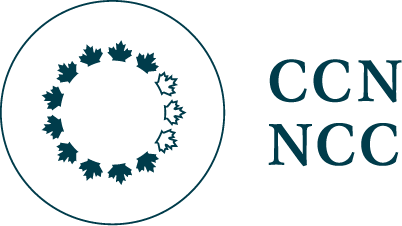
- Native name: Commission de la capitale nationale
- Type: Crown corporation
- Industry: Property management, urban planning
- Predecessor: Federal District Commission
- Founded: 1959; 67 years ago
- Headquarters: Central Chambers, 202–40 Elgin Street, Ottawa, ON, Canada
- Area served: National Capital Region
- Key people: Tobi Nussbaum (CEO); Maryse Gaudreault (Chair)
- Owner: Government of Canada
- Number of employees: 419 (2017)
- National Capital Commission

Agency overview
- Minister responsible: Marc Miller, Minister of Canadian Identity and Culture
- Key document: National Capital Act (R.S.C., 1985, c. N-4)
- Website: ncc-ccn.gc.ca

The National Capital Commission (NCC; French: Commission de la capitale nationale, CCN) is the Crown corporation responsible for development, urban planning, and conservation in Canada's Capital Region (Ottawa, Ontario and Gatineau, Quebec), including administering most lands and buildings owned by the Government of Canada in the region.

The NCC is the capital's largest property owner, owning and managing over 11% of all lands in the Capital Region. It also owns over 1,600 properties in its real estate portfolio, including the capital's six official residences; commercial, residential and heritage buildings; and agricultural facilities.

The NCC reports to the Parliament of Canada through whichever minister in the Cabinet of Canada is designated responsible for the National Capital Act, currently the Minister of Public Services and Procurement.

== History ==
=== Ottawa Improvement Commission (1899–1927) ===
Through the 19th century, the character of what is known today as the National Capital Region was blemished and transformed by industrialization. According to then-Prime Minister Wilfrid Laurier, what became the City of Ottawa was "not a handsome city" by the 1880s. Laurier, together with Lady Aberdeen, the wife of the governor general, advanced the idea of planning for a better capital.

In 1899, the Ottawa Improvement Commission (OIC) was established with the core mandate of improving and beautifying the city. What began as the OIC evolved as an organization in terms of both mandate and scope over 120 years.

The OIC initially consisted of 4 (later 6) volunteer commissioners: three federal appointees, as well as the mayor of Ottawa. The OIC was supported by notable Capital builders, such as Government of Canada botanist William Saunders and Robert Surtees, former city engineer and designer of Major's Hill Park. The commission acquired land as early as 1901, and its first priority was to clean up the banks of the Rideau Canal, create and expand a park system, as well as a network of boulevards and parkways. One of the OIC's first projects was the Rideau Canal Driveway (now the Queen Elizabeth Driveway).

Four years following its establishment, the OIC hired Frederick G. Todd, a pioneer in landscape architecture, to aid in reshaping the city. Todd completed his plan, dubbed as the Todd Report, in 1903. Two of his major recommendations were the construction of a ceremonial boulevard linking Rideau Hall and the Parliament Buildings, and the preservation of large natural parks adjacent to the Capital. This plan was the first to recommend improvements north of the Ottawa River.

==== The Todd, Holt, and Cauchon Reports ====
Following the Todd Report was a master plan for Canada's Capital, tabled by Herbert S. Holt's Federal Plan Commission (or, the Holt Commission). Todd was appointed chairmen when the Federal Plan Commission was established in 1913 by Order-In-Council of Prime Minister Robert Borden's government with the purpose of "draw[ing] up and perfect[ing]" a comprehensive scheme for the future of the rapidly growing Federal Capital, called the "General Plan." The commission was joined by a renowned architect and urban planner from Chicago, Edward H. Bennett, who prepared the General Plan.

The "Report of the Federal Plan Commission on a General Plan for the Cities of Ottawa and Hull," better known as the "Holt Report" or the "Bennett Plan," was released in January 1915 and was one of Canada's first comprehensive plans. The report recommended that the work of the OIC be broadened, expanding on the 1903 Todd Commission's beautification proposals for urban parkways and a linked city park system. This included formally establishing Gatineau Park.

Most notably, the Report recommended a major political reform: the creation of a federal district and federal authority to exercise control over planning and development. The General Plan recommended extinguishing the Ottawa and Hull municipal governments. In their place, a Federal District Commission, similar to the governance model of Washington, D.C., was recommended. This commission, reporting to the Government of Canada, would benevolently dictate the planning, development and operation of Canada's Capital. Ultimately, the Holt/Bennett General Plan was shelved; however, many of its technical recommendations were implemented over 40 years after it was written.

In 1922, Noulan Cauchon, one of the founders of the Town Planning Institute of Canada, published a report (known as the "Cauchon Report") containing a new planning strategy for the Capital. The report included numerous studies on the Capital done by Cauchon over a period of around 16 years. It also proposed the reorganization of railway tracks, the building of highways, the development of parks and parkways, and the relocation of industrial activities.

=== Federal District Commission (1927–58) ===
In 1927, the OIC was reorganized as the Federal District Commission (FDC). As its jurisdiction grew to include parts of Quebec, the FDC expanded the region's open spaces, extended parkways, improved Dow's Lake, and developed Confederation Square in conjunction with the City of Ottawa. In 1934, a citizens' group urged the government to purchase land in the Gatineau Hills to save its forests. In 1937, three years later, the FDC began to acquire land for Gatineau Park and, by 1939, a total of 6,500 hectares had been acquired.

In 1936, Prime Minister William Lyon Mackenzie King invited French town planner Jacques Gréber to act as an advisor for planning in the Capital. A couple of years later, in 1938, Gréber was commissioned to develop a vision and plan for the National Capital Region, now famously known as the Gréber Plan.

Due to the Second World War, however, Gréber's plan was put on hold. At the conclusion of the War in 1945, an area of 2,330 km^{2} (580,000 acres) was declared the "National Capital District," and the Federal District Commission Act was amended to expand the responsibilities of the FDC, giving it a truly national scope.

Gréber was eventually invited back to develop his plan for the Capital, which was finally published in 1950.

=== National Capital Commission (1959–present) ===
In 1958, Parliament passed the National Capital Act, which established the National Capital Region as well as a new National Capital Commission (NCC) to succeed the FDC as responsible for bringing Gréber's plan into reality. The replacement of the FDC came as result of it having repeatedly failed to convince municipal governments to cooperate in planning efforts regarding the National Capital Region. (Note: See Gibson J., NCC v. Munro, Court of the Exchequer, 1965.)

The National Capital Region was expanded to a total of 4,660 km^{2} (1,150,000 acres) of land on both sides of the Ottawa River; for one thing, the NCC acquired the funds to purchase lands to create the National Capital Greenbelt. The National Capital Act gave, and continues to give, the NCC statutory authority to implement its plans, an authority confirmed by the Supreme Court of Canada's ruling in Munro v National Capital Commission.

After the 2006 elections, the Government of Canada asked for a formal review of the mandate of the NCC. A panel conducting the review, in its report, suggested that the NCC needed more money and should become more transparent.

In 2018, the Government of Canada announced CA$55 million in funding to support critical repair and maintenance of NCC's major infrastructure assets. In 2020, the NCC secured $52.4 million in funding towards some of its most significant assets.

== Assets ==
The NCC is responsible for managing and maintaining several assets in the Capital Region.

=== Scenic parkways ===
The NCC operates 90 kilometers of scenic parkways through Ottawa and NCC parks in Gatineau.

==== Gatineau ====
- Champlain Parkway
- Fortune Lake Parkway
- Gatineau Parkway
- Lac-des-Fées Parkway
- Leamy Lake Parkway

==== Ottawa ====
- Aviation Parkway
- Colonel By Drive
- Driveway (at the Central Experimental Farm)
- Island Park Drive
- Kichi Zibi Mikan
- Queen Elizabeth Driveway
- Sir George-Étienne Cartier Parkway

=== Urban parks ===
The NCC operates several urban parks in Ottawa and Gatineau.

- Commissioners Park
- Confederation Park
- Kìwekì Point
- Jacques-Cartier Park
- Leamy Lake Park
- LeBreton Flats Park
- Major's Hill Park
- Vincent Massey Park

=== Official residences ===
The NCC is the steward of the Capital's six official residences:

- Rideau Hall
- 24 Sussex Drive
- Harrington Lake
- Stornoway
- The Farm
- 7 Rideau Gate.

=== Other ===
Other assets managed by the NCC are:

- Agricultural and research facilities
- Capital Pathway
- Commemorative monuments (e.g. the National Holocaust Monument and the Royal Canadian Navy Monument)
- Confederation Boulevard
- Gatineau Park
- National Capital Greenbelt
  - Mer Bleue Bog, a Wetland of International Significance designated under the Ramsar Convention
- Real property and heritage buildings
- Rideau Canal Skateway

== Responsibilities ==
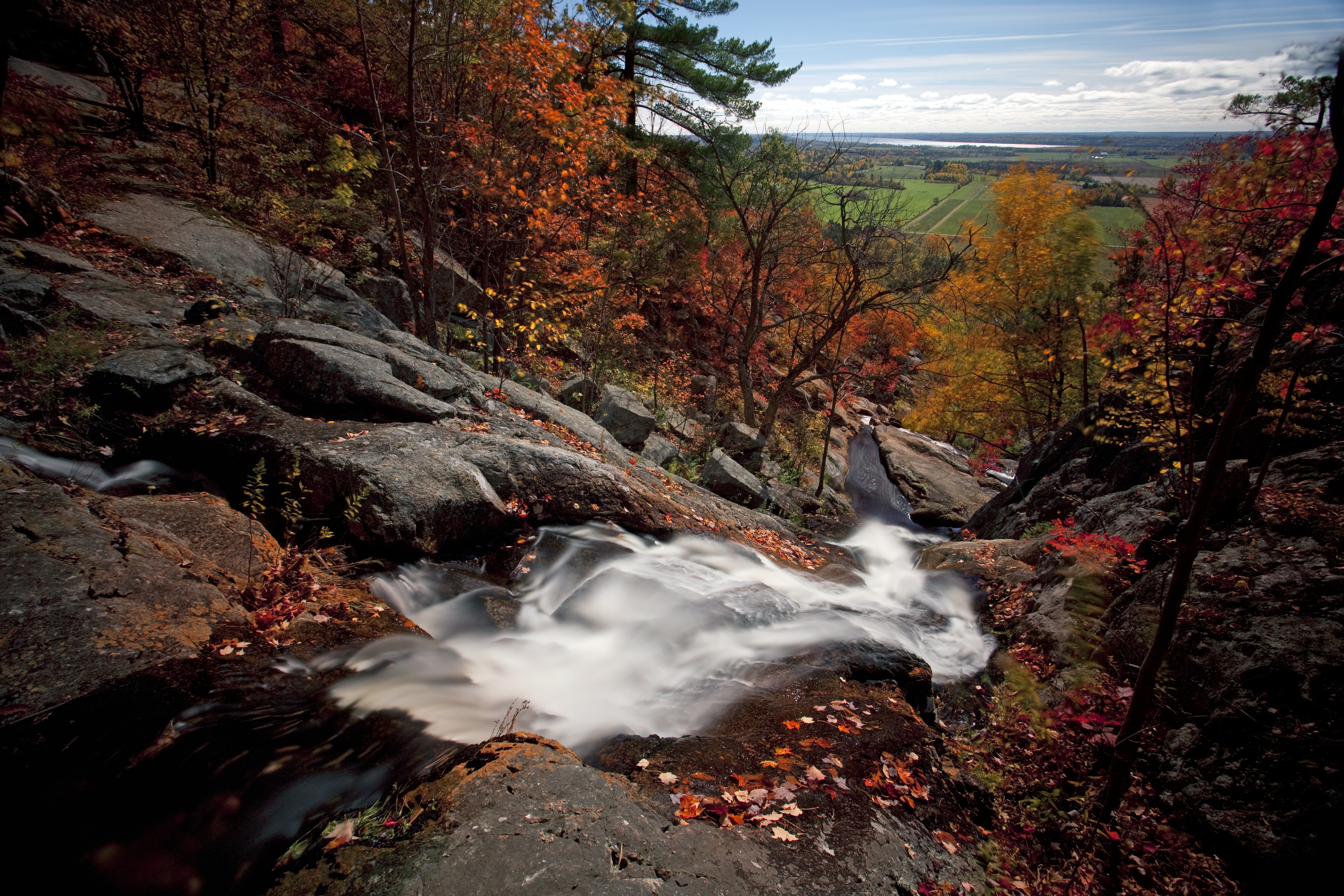
Luskville Falls in Gatineau Park, in fall

The role of the NCC is to champion the interests of Ottawa, Gatineau, and surrounding region as the nation's capital, typically with regard to issues of national interest, such as the location of monument and museum sites, and major streetscapes such as Confederation Boulevard.

The objects and purposes of the NCC are "to prepare plans for and assist in the development, conservation and improvement of the National Capital Region in order that the nature and character of the seat of the Government of Canada may be in accordance with its national significance."

The NCC is the Capital's largest property owner, owning and managing over 11% of all lands in the Capital Region. It also owns over 1,600 properties in its real estate portfolio, including the Capital's six official residences; commercial, residential and heritage buildings; and agricultural facilities.

Over 70 NCC-managed buildings that are older than 40 years have been designated as "classified" or "recognized" federal heritage buildings by the Federal Heritage Buildings Review Office (FHBRO).

The continuing preservation, evolution and management of Confederation Boulevard, the ceremonial route linking key attractions in the National Capital Region, on both sides of the Ottawa River, in Ottawa as well as Gatineau, Quebec, are the responsibility of the NCC and its partners.

These roles are in contrast with the mandates of the various municipal governments, which serve the benefit of their immediate residents, under provincial legislation, on issues like road maintenance, sewer, water and public transport.

== Organization ==
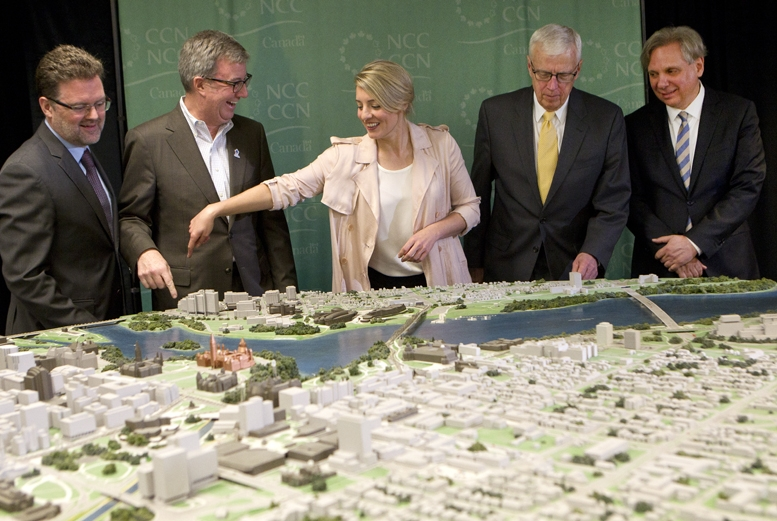
The day the mayors of Gatineau and Ottawa joined the NCC's board of directors. Left to right: Maxime Pedneau-Jobin (mayor of Gatineau), Jim Watson (mayor of Ottawa), Mélanie Joly (Heritage Minister), Russell Andrew Mills (former NCC Chairperson) and Dr. Mark Kristmanson (NCC CEO).

The NCC is the responsibility of the Minister of Public Works and Procurement, currently Filomena Tassi. In the 28th Canadian Ministry under Stephen Harper, the NCC reported to Parliament through the Minister of Foreign Affairs, and then through senior Ottawa-area cabinet ministers, the last of whom was Pierre Poilievre.

It is governed by the National Capital Act, which explains the boundaries of the National Capital Region in great detail. Its headquarters are in the Chambers Building on Elgin Street, between Queen and Sparks Streets.

=== Board of directors ===
Oversight and direction of the NCC's operations and assets are the responsibility of its national board of directors.

As defined in the National Capital Act, the board consists of a chairperson, a chief executive officer (CEO), and 13 other members with relevant professional backgrounds from the Capital Region and across Canada. Since April 2016, the mayors of Ottawa and Gatineau have also ex officio held seats on the board, on a non-voting basis.

The NCC holds an annual public meeting in which members of the public are able to express their ideas and ask questions directly to the board. The scope of these annual meetings includes direct public input in a workshop to "discuss the NCC's strategic priorities for the coming year."

As of May 2021, current board members include:

- Tobi Nussbaum — Chief Executive Officer
- Maryse Gaudreault — Chairperson
- Maude Marquis-Bissonnette — non-voting ex-officio participant (Mayor of Gatineau)
- Mark Sutcliffe — non-voting ex-officio participant (Mayor of Ottawa)
- Lisa M. MacDonald
- Tanya Gracie
- Mireille Apollon
- Larry Beasley
- Lise Bernier
- Victor Brunette
- Michael Foderick
- Caroline Lajoie
- Deborah Lynn Morrison
- Norm Odjick
- Sara Jane O'Neill
- Lou Ragagnin
- Denis B. Vaillancourt

==== Chairpersons and CEOs ====
The CEO is accountable to the board of directors for the management of the NCC's operations and "the implementation of the board's strategic directions for the coming year."

CEO and Chairperson (pre-2008 amendment)
Name	Period
Major General Howard Kennedy	1952–1959
Alan K. Hay	1959–1961
Lt. Gen. Samuel Findlay Clark	1961–1967
A. John Frost	1967–1969
Douglas H. Fullerton	1969–1973
Edgar Gallant	1973–1976
Pierre Juneau	1976–1977
Charles Mills Drury	1978–1985
Jean Elizabeth Morrison Pigott	1985–1992
Marcel Beaudry	1992–2006

Post-2008 amendment
Name	Period
Chairperson
Russell Andrew Mills	2007–2017
Marc Seaman	2017–2023
Maryse Gaudreault	2023–present
Chief Executive Officer
Micheline Dubé (acting)	2007
Marie Lemay	2008–2012
Jean-François Trépanier (acting)	2012–2014
Mark Kristmanson	2014–2019
Tobi Nussbaum	2019–present

=== Committees ===
The following are the committees and committee members of the NCC as of May 2021.

The 5-person Executive Committee is called upon when necessary to deal with specific business or issues. It can be delegated certain powers and functions by the board of directors. This Committee includes: Marc Seaman (chairperson), Mireille Apollon, Larry Beasley, Norm Odjick, and Tobi Nussbaum.

The 8-person Audit Committee oversees the NCC's internal audit function, and reviews the special examinations and annual financial audits of the federal Office of the Auditor General. It also oversees the reporting of financial information, ensuring that the necessary processes and controls are in place for the NCC to achieve its objectives. This committee consists of 6 board members, plus the NCC chairperson and the CEO (as ex officio members).

The Governance Committee reviews (and makes recommendations to the board on) matters relating to amendments to the by-laws; the selection criteria for, duties of and benefits for the chairperson, CEO and other board and committee members; the mandate, functioning, competency profile and performance appraisals of the board and its committees; the terms of reference and the selection process for the ombudsman; and general governance issues. A minimum of 5 board members, plus the NCC chairperson and the CEO (as ex officio members) sit on the Governance Committee.

The Advisory Committee on Planning, Design and Realty advises on the long-range plans and policies for the use of public lands and properties in the Capital Region; design proposals affecting federal lands; and matters of real property. The committee consists of experts in real estate development; environmental, urban, and regional planning; urban design; architecture; and landscape architecture. The committee has 11 members, in addition to two board members who act as observers and two ex officio members (NCC chairperson and CEO). Aside from the NCC chairperson and CEO, this committee includes: Maryse Gaudreault (Ex-Officio member), Vincent Asselin (chairperson), Ken Greenberg, David L.A. Gordon, Bruce Haden, Anne-Marie Parent, Tobi Nussbaum (Ex-Officio member), Barry Padolsky, Beverly A. Sandalack, Collinda Joseph (observer), Caroline Lajoie (observer), and Andy Kikites (observer).

The Advisory Committee on the Official Residences of Canada advises on asset management and matters that pertain to the 6 official residences in the Capital Region. The committee also provides advice to Public Services and Procurement Canada, who is responsible for the Citadel, i.e., the Governor General’s official residence in Québec City. The committee consists of experts in interior design, architecture, heritage, and real estate development. It has 7 members, plus 1 board observer and 2 ex officio members (the NCC chairperson and the CEO). Aside from the ex officio and observer members, committee members include: Marta Farevaag (chairperson), Bernard Serge Gagné (vice chairperson), Ken Greenberg, Hagit Hadaya, and Chris Piché.

The Canadiana Fund solicits donations of heritage art, furniture, and funds to augment the staterooms of the official residences. Pieces that are chosen are meant to "reflect Canada's heritage, artistic traditions and historical associations," or they "complement the architectural style of a particular residence." The Canadiana Fund consists of Cynthia Price Verreault (chairperson), Anne Fotheringham, Kathy Hays, Douglas B. Richardson, Deborah Riley, Harvey A. Slack, Candace Stevenson, Clyde Wells, and Fei Wong.

The Advisory Committee on Universal Accessibility is mandated to assist the NCC by considering those projects that involve a significant universal accessibility component. It has 7 members—4 from outside the NCC and 3 NCC employees—all of whom are those who have expertise and experience in matters related to the subject. These members are Anne Ménard (chairperson), Collinda Joseph (vice-chairperson), Yoland Charette, Catherine Gardner, Rita Tadi, Daryl Rock, and Monique Beaudoin.

== Partnerships ==
The NCC has built relationships with people and organizations throughout the Capital Region and across Canada, including local municipalities and Indigenous communities. To foster partnerships in the planning and stewardship of the Capital, the NCC created the Urbanism Lab, where lectures, events, and public consultations take place on a regular basis.

The NCC is the Capital's largest property owner, owning and managing over 11% of all lands in the Capital Region. As such, the NCC collaborates with the region's municipalities on various issues, including urban planning, safe and active transportation, and property and land stewardship. The Capital Region includes 13 municipalities, the largest of which are Ottawa and Gatineau.

The Algonquin First Nation are among the region's indigenous communities with whom the NCC works with in particular. Major Algonquin communities include: Pikwàkanagàn First Nation, located on the shores of the Bonnechere River and Golden Lake; and Kitigan Zibi Anishinabe First Nation, located just outside the municipality of Maniwaki.

The NCC also collaborates with other Government of Canada departments and agencies, as well as with national and international organizations and associations.

Other key collaborations and partnerships include:

- Canada's Capital Cities Organization (CCCO) — includes representatives from the national, provincial, and territorial capitals of Canada, with the aim to foster dialogue among participants from various parts of the country.
- Capitals Alliance — a global forum for planners and urban designers in capital cities around the world.
- Ottawa Tourism — a private, nonprofit, membership-based organization that promotes tourism in Ottawa and the region.
- Outaouais Tourism — a private, nonprofit organization that encourages tourism in Gatineau, the Outaouais, and the region.
- Nokia — the title sponsor of the NCC's Sunday Bikedays program since at least 2016.

=== Former ===
- Eugene Melnyk, with planned proposal Rendezvous Lebreton.

== Criticisms ==
The Government of Canada is the largest employer and largest landowner in these two areas, and the NCC thus has a great deal of influence over the cities. This has sometimes been criticized by city officials from Ottawa and Gatineau for a lack of cooperation, such as in 1998 when the NCC proposed levelling a large strip of downtown Ottawa to build a ceremonial boulevard along the city's existing Metcalfe Street.

Over the last 30 years, the activities of the NCC have been denounced or castigated by several Quebec governments. They considered municipal affairs to be a purely provincial jurisdiction, according to the constitution of Canada. Others have criticized the group for what they perceive to be poor or misguided planning decisions.

== See also ==
- Greber Plan
