= Central Chambers (Ottawa) =

Historic office building in Ontario, Canada

Coordinates: 45.4232°N 75.6953°W

Central Chambers

Central Chambers is a building at the corner of Elgin Street and Queen Street in Ottawa that is a National Historic Site. It is located at 42 to 54 Elgin Street, next to Bell Block. It faces the Canadian War Memorial at Confederation Square. Central Chambers was built between 1890 and 1893 and designed by John James Browne of Montreal, an example of Queen Anne Revival commercial architecture. Formerly serving as an office for the Canadian Atlantic Railway, it now houses the National Capital Commission.

The building was purchased by the NCC in the 60's, remained vacant throughout much of the 70s and 80s, and in 1992, plans were made for renovations. In 1994 the NCC gutted the interior and the facade became integrated into a new office tower complex. It was designated as a National Historic Site of Canada in 1990 for being a fine example of the Queen Anne Revival style in commercial architecture.

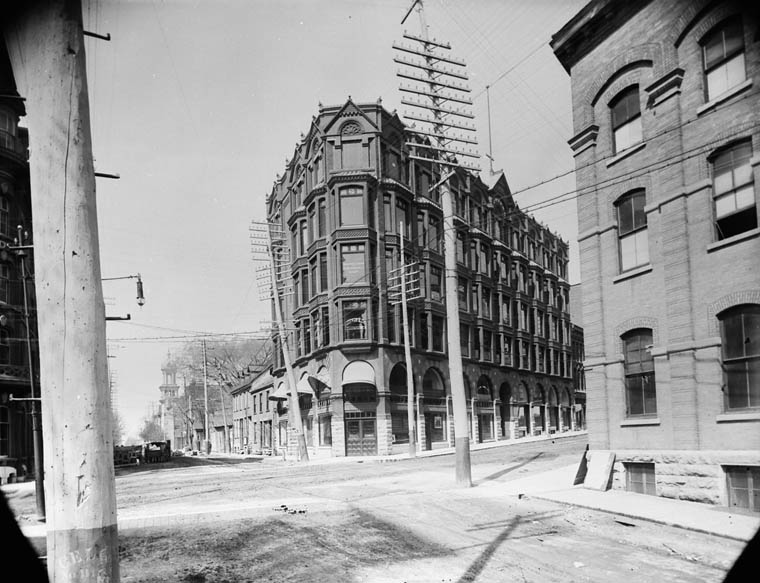
Central Chambers, 1893

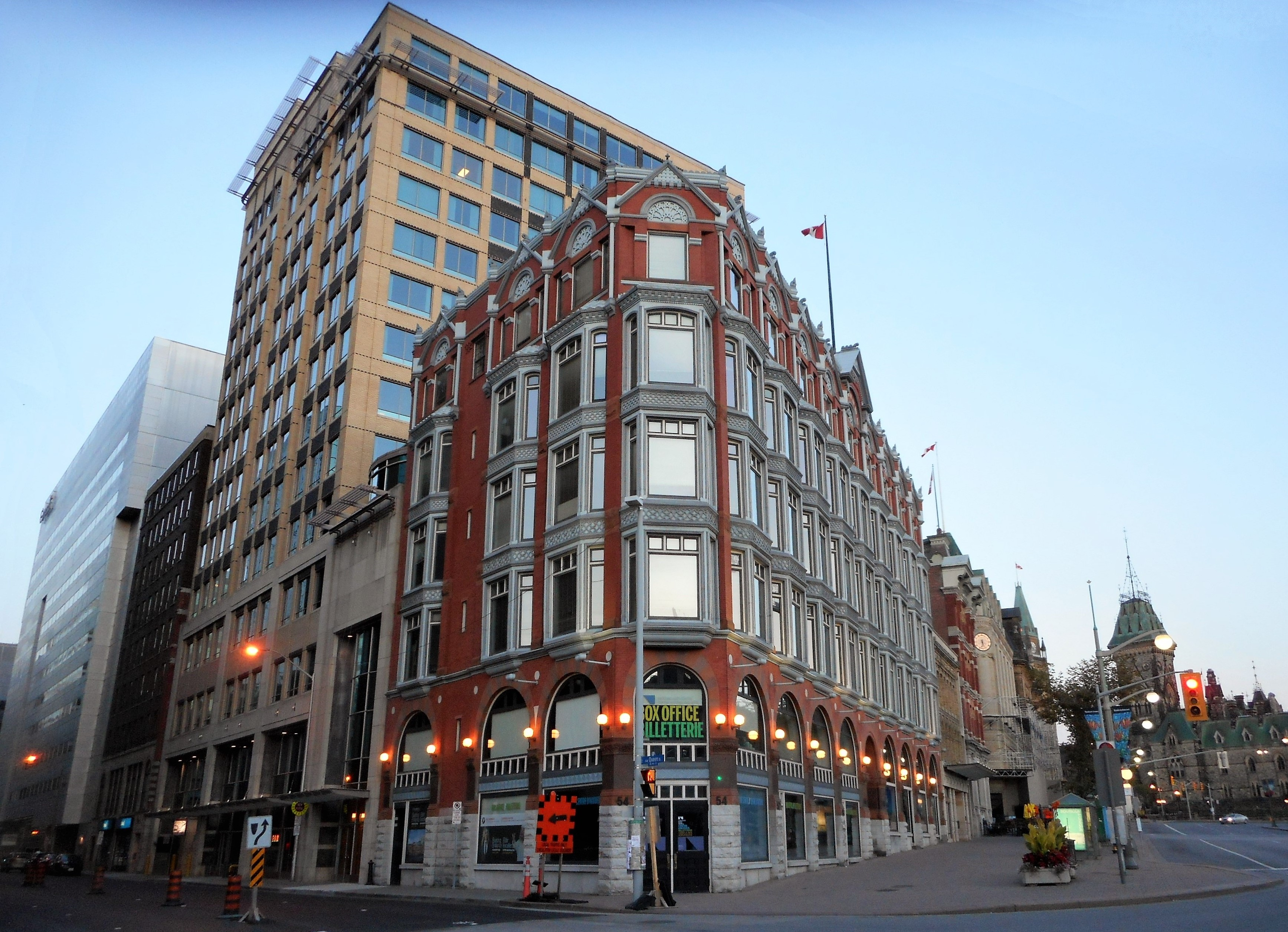
Queen Street

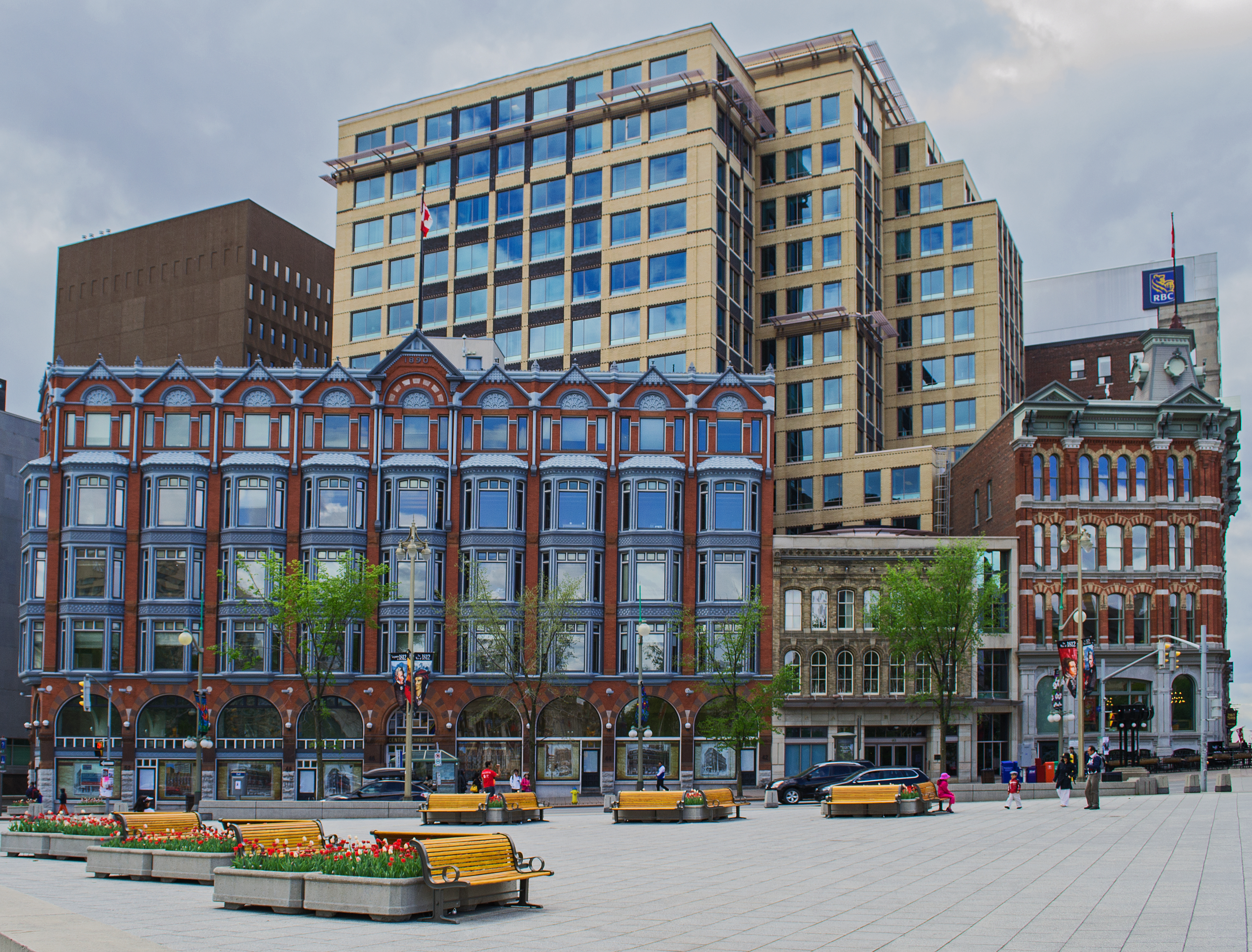
Central Chambers, Bell Block, and Scottish Ontario Chambers

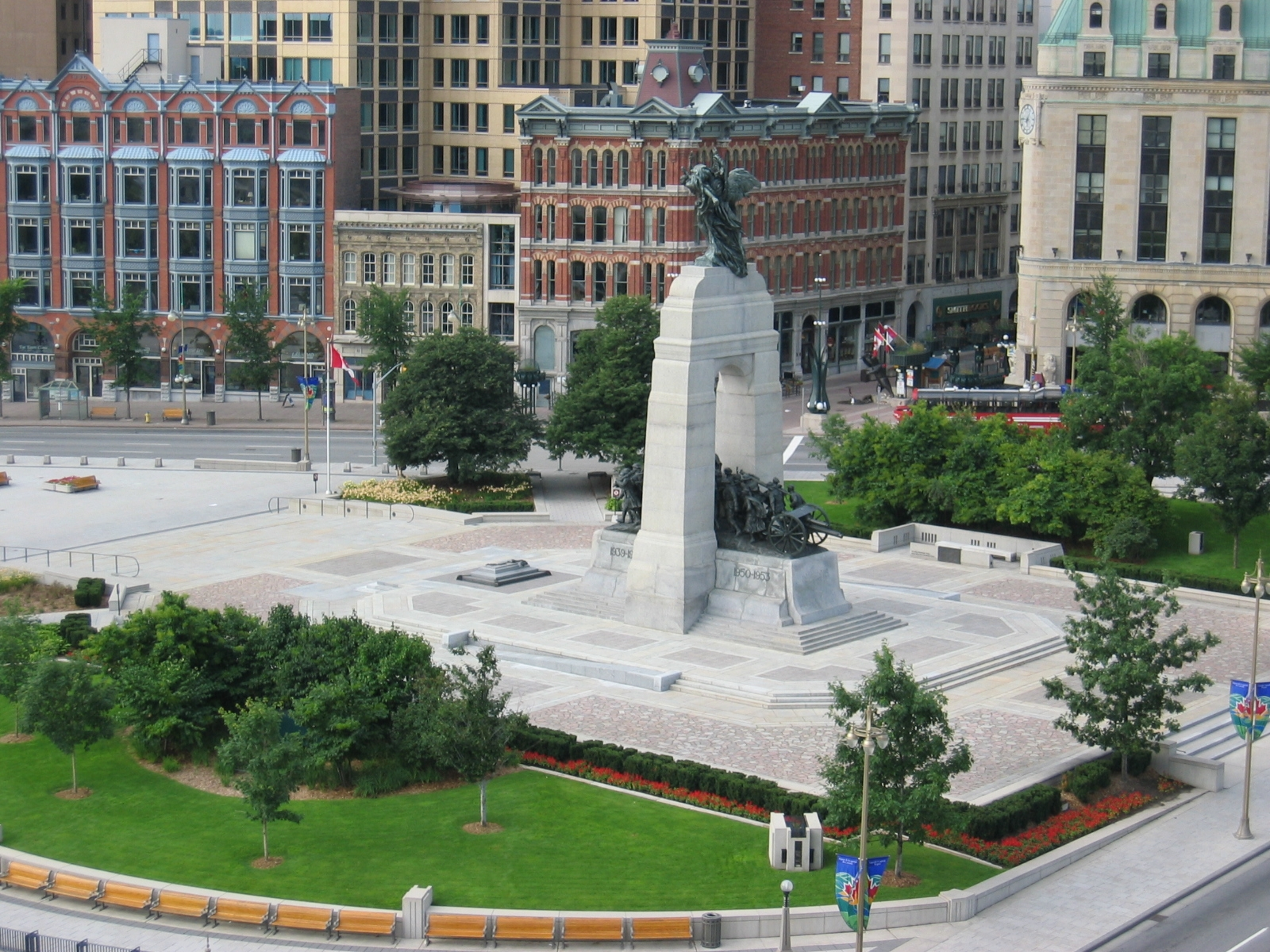
Central Chambers (leftmost building) at Confederation Square
