= Confederation Square =

Square in Ottawa, Canada

Coordinates: 45.42402°N 75.69551°W

Confederation Square Place de la Confédération (French)
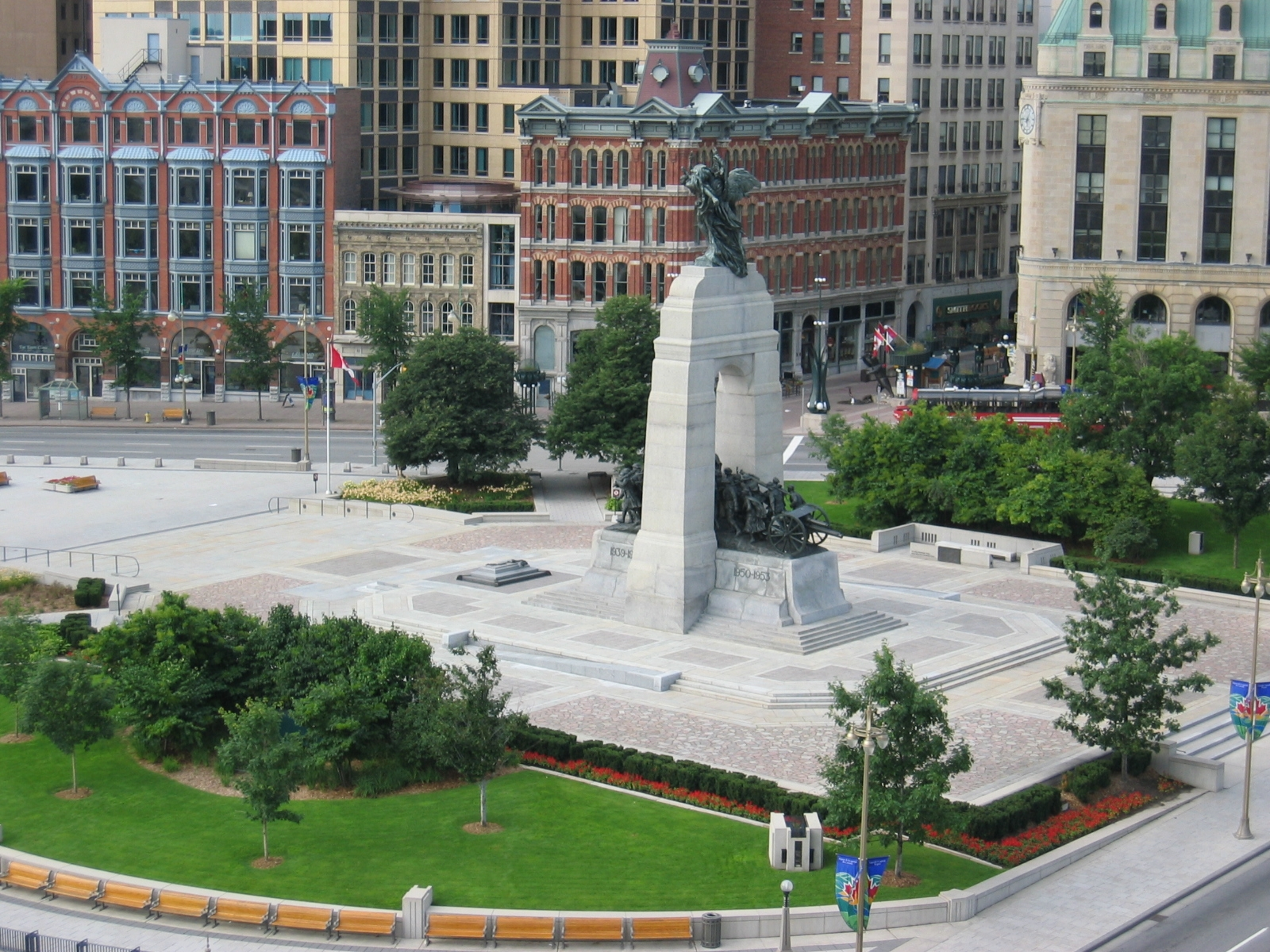
- View of Confederation Square from the northeast
- Interactive map of Confederation Square; Place de la Confédération (French)
- Location: Ontario, Canada
- Nearest city: Ottawa
- Governing body: National Capital Commission

National Historic Site of Canada
- Designated: 1984

Confederation Square (French: Place de la Confédération) is an urban square in Ottawa, Ontario, Canada, and is considered the second most important ceremonial centre in Canada's capital city, after Parliament Hill. Roughly triangular in area, with Canada's National War Memorial at its centre and the Valiants Memorial at its periphery, the square is bounded by Wellington Street to the north and branches of Elgin Street to the east and west.

The square was designated a National Historic Site of Canada in 1984. Confederation Square's importance is due not only to its central location in Ottawa and its status as a rare Canadian example of a City Beautiful-inspired square, but also arises from the landmark buildings that frame the square: the Château Laurier, the Senate of Canada Building, the National Arts Centre, the Central Chambers, the Scottish Ontario Chambers, the Central Post Office, the PMO and the East Block. Part of the square crosses over the Rideau Canal, itself a National Historic Site of Canada and a World Heritage Site.

== History ==
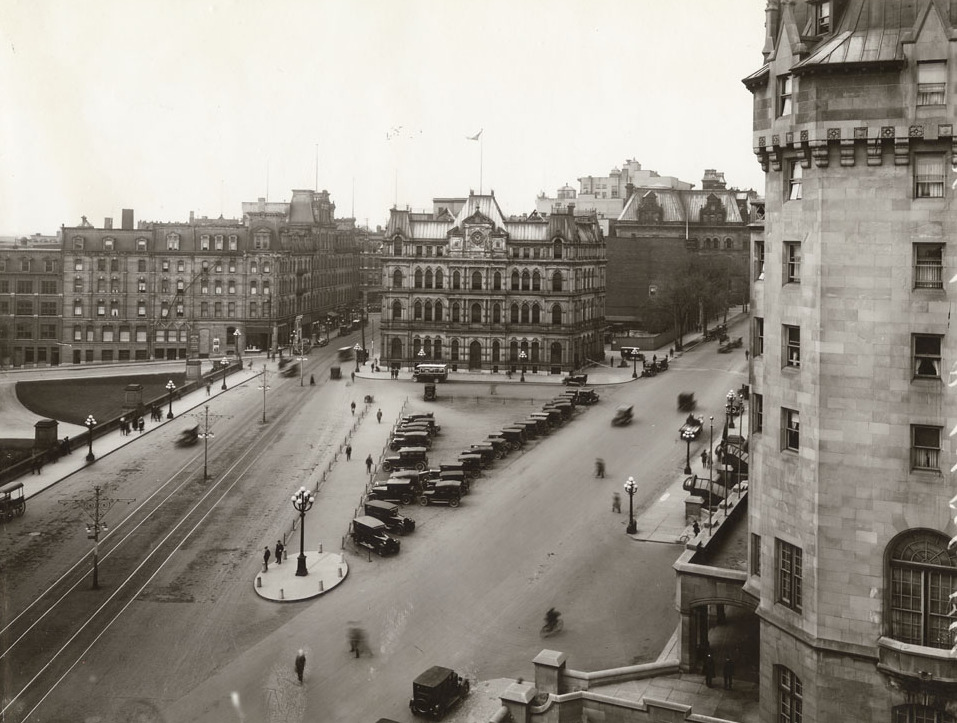
Ottawa Post Office 1876-1938

A triangular plaza once located approximately at the site of today's Confederation Square was (originally) named after Governor General Connaught. Before 1910, today's Plaza Bridge over the Rideau Canal had been two separate bridges which were replaced at the time by a single bridge under which rail traffic would pass from the new Union Station past the (also new) Chateau Laurier. This work was finished by December 1912 and the location was named "Connaught Place" on March 24, 1913.

Two prime ministers had promoted the beautification of the capital city, Wilfrid Laurier from 1896 to 1911 and William Lyon Mackenzie King whose first term began in 1921. By 1927, a commission for improvements named the Federal District Commission was formed out of an earlier effort called the Ottawa Improvement Commission. King invited French architect Jacques Gréber to help with the design for a square which would include a war memorial.

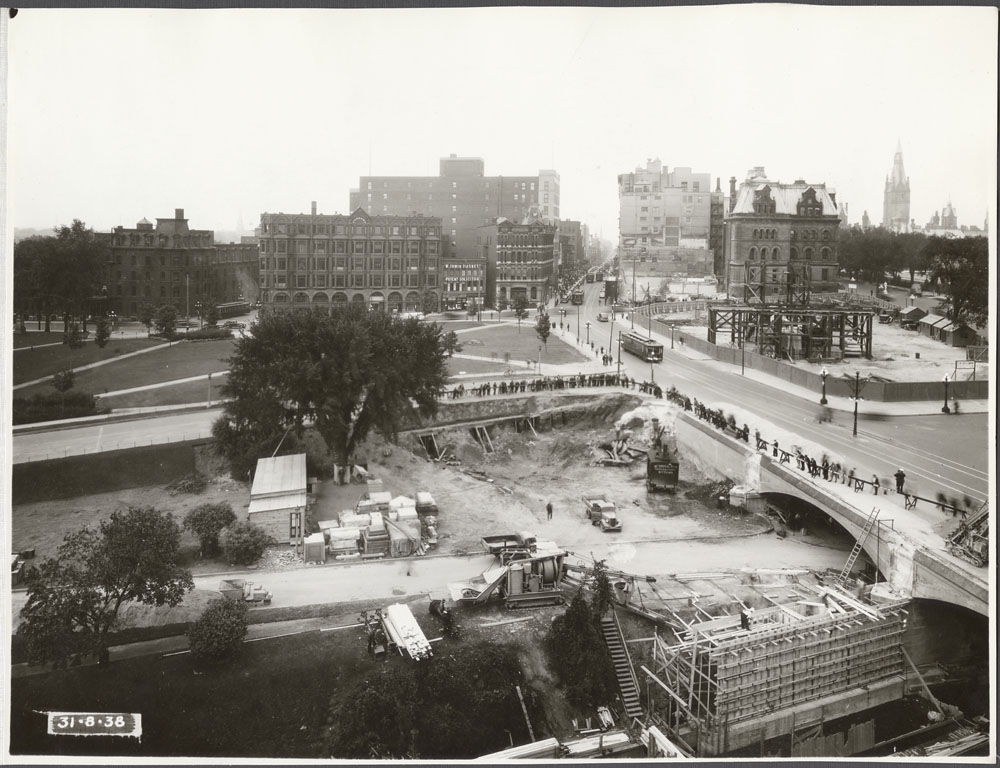
August 31, 1938

The area at this time also had five notable structures, most which have been standing for decades. The old post office (c. 1876 Second Empire-style building by Walter Chesterton was rebuilt after 1904 fire) was located where the current war memorial stands, the Russell House hotel was on the southeast side of Sparks and Elgin, the Russell Theatre (adjoining the hotel) was on the corner of Queen and Elgin, the old City Hall was on the east side of Elgin between Queen and Albert, and Knox Presbyterian Church at Elgin and Albert, on the site of today's National Arts Centre.

King had plans involving widening Elgin Street even by 1927, with hopes of bringing emphasis to the Parliament Hill. The hotel was destroyed by fire on April 14, 1928. The Russell Theatre, which was also burnt on that date got expropriated for demolition in order to bring about these plans. The Federal District Commission later expropriated the hotel's site. The church was expropriated November 20, 1930. City Hall burned down March 31, 1931.

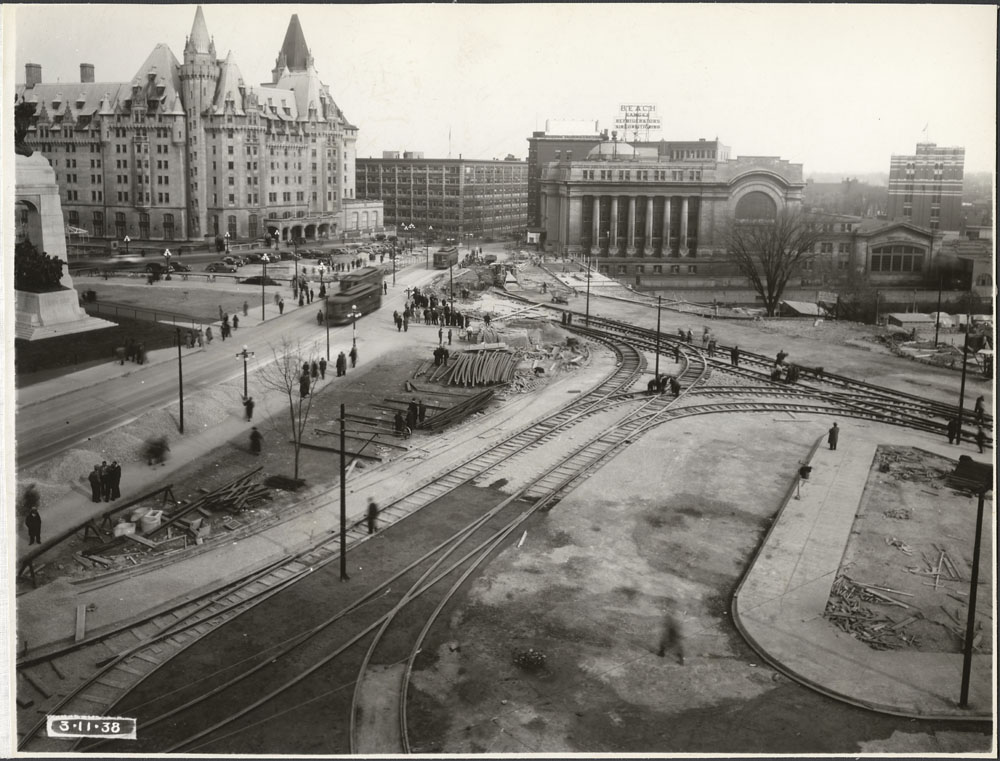
November 3, 1938

In 1937, Greber visited Ottawa but disagreed with King on the placement of the war memorial, for fear of traffic problems.

Ottawa's former Central Post Office had been constructed in 1876. The old post office was demolished in (May and) June 1938 in order to build the square.

Knox Presbyterian Church had also been demolished in June 1938. The Royal Bank of Canada building (once James Hope and Company) at the northwest corner of Elgin and Sparks had been removed (for the new Post Office). By October, the War Memorial had been erected and the Plaza Bridge had been widened. Work was underway for the

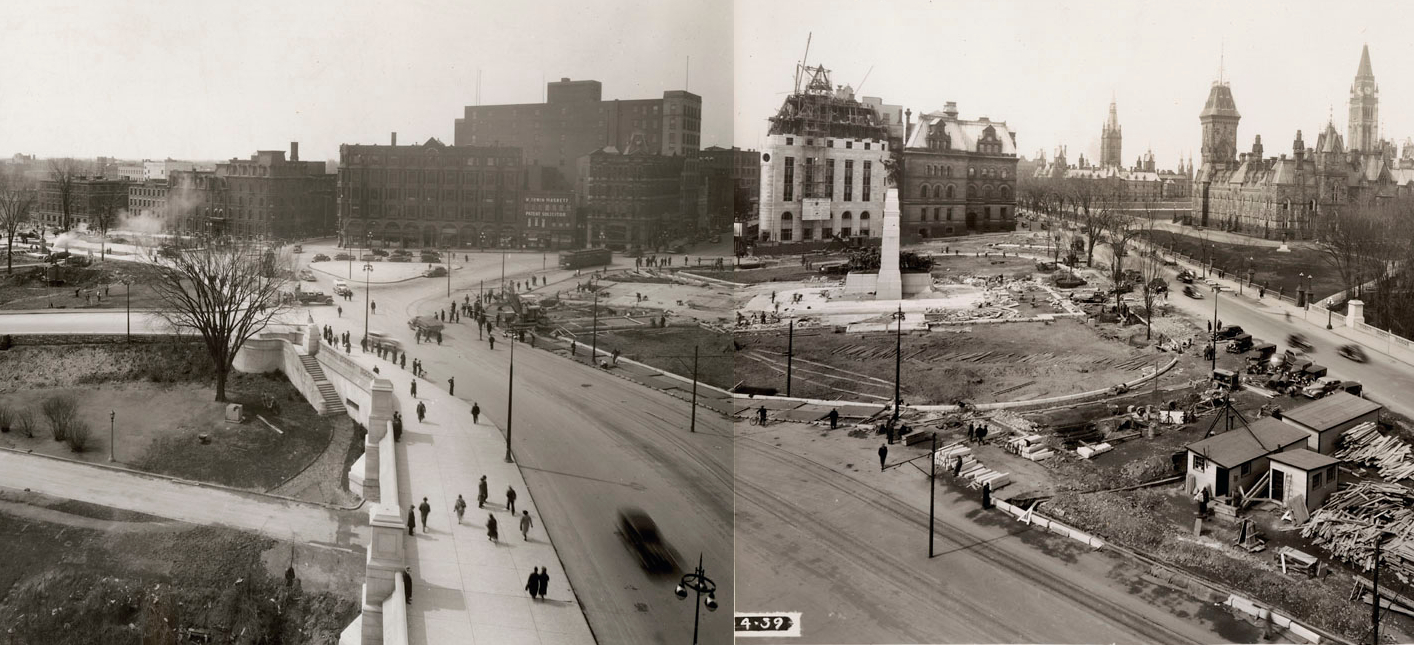
April 28, 1939

building of the new Central Post Office. Elgin Street was widened in April 1939. and Confederation Square continued to be landscaped while post office was being completed. By this time, the square was renamed Confederation Square for the National War Memorial. It wouldn't be until June 1969 that the National Arts Centre would be opened. In May 1939, King George VI came to visit Ottawa and formally unveiled the new War Memorial.

== See also ==
- Confederation Boulevard, ceremonial route
- List of National Historic Sites of Canada in Ontario
