= Bell Block =

Bell Block may refer to:

- Bell Block (Los Angeles), California, US
- Bell Block (Ottawa), Ontario, Canada
- Bell Block, New Zealand, Taranaki, New Zealand
