= National War Memorial (Canada) =

Canadian war memorial

National War Memorial Monument commémoratif de guerre du Canada
- The Response (La Réponse)
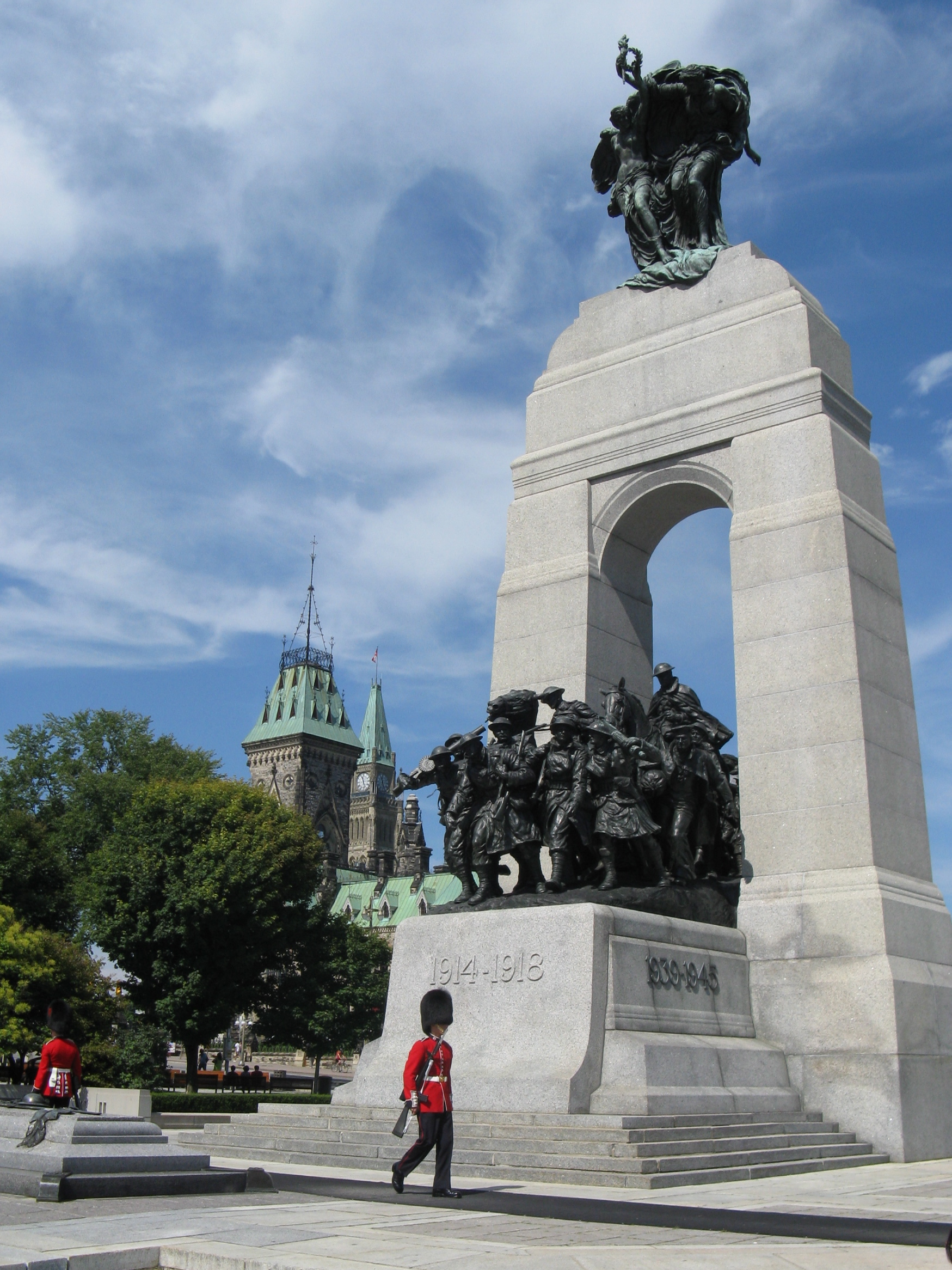
- Two Ceremonial Guard sentries at the National War Memorial in Ottawa
- Interactive map of National War Memorial; Monument commémoratif de guerre du Canada
- Location: Ottawa, Ontario, Canada
- Coordinates: 45°25′26.53″N 75°41′43.79″W
- Designer: Vernon March
- Type: War memorial
- Material: Granite, bronze
- Length: 15.9 metres (52 ft)
- Width: 8 metres (26 ft)
- Height: 21.34 metres (70.0 ft)
- Opening date: 21 May 1939; 87 years ago
- Dedicated to: Every Canadian killed in battle

The National War Memorial (French: Monument commémoratif de guerre du Canada), titled The Response (French: La Réponse), is a tall, granite memorial arch with accreted bronze sculptures in Ottawa, Ontario, designed by Vernon March and first dedicated by King George VI in 1939. Originally built to commemorate the Canadians who died in the First World War, it was in 1982 rededicated to also include those killed in the Second World War and Korean War and again in 2014 to add the dead from the Second Boer War and War in Afghanistan, as well as all Canadians killed in all conflicts past and future. It now serves as the pre-eminent war memorial of 76 cenotaphs in Canada. In 2000, the Tomb of the Unknown Soldier was added in front of the memorial and symbolizes the sacrifices made by all Canadians who have died or may yet die for their country.

== Context and use ==
The National War Memorial is the focal point of Confederation Square in Canada's capital city, Ottawa, Ontario. The square is located between several major buildings and features, with Parliament Hill to the northwest, the Rideau Canal to the northeast, and the National Arts Centre to the east. Buildings situated west of the square include the Bell Block, the Central Chambers building, the Office of the Prime Minister and Privy Council, and the Scottish Ontario Chambers building. There are several other commemorative buildings and monuments nearby, including the Peace Tower (and the Memorial Chamber) at the parliament buildings, the National Aboriginal Veterans Monument, the Animals in War Memorial, a Boer War memorial, the Peacekeeping Monument, the Valiants Memorial, and the War of 1812 Monument.

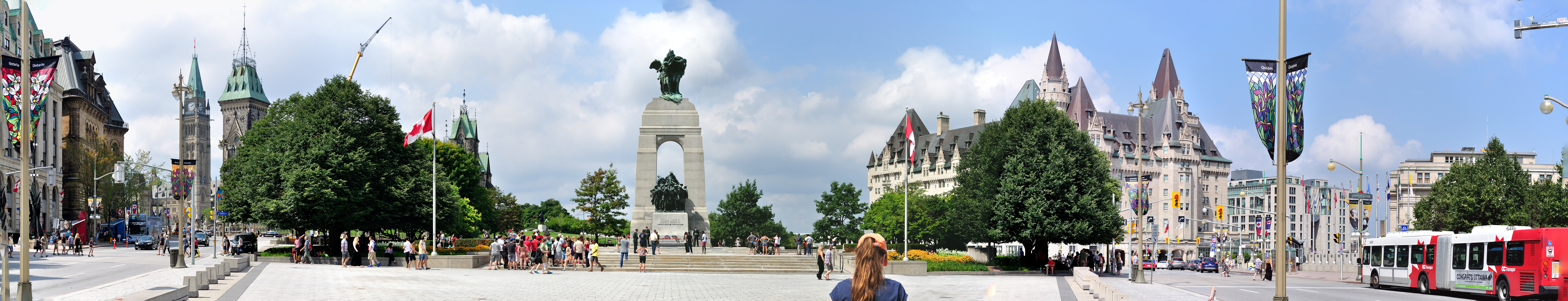
Panoramic view of Confederation Square looking north, with the National War Memorial at its centre

Since 1940, the National War Memorial is the site of the national Remembrance Day ceremony, organized every year by the Royal Canadian Legion for 11 November. Along with Canadian war veterans, the ceremony is attended by the governor general, sometimes members of the Canadian royal family, the prime minister, the Silver Cross mother, representatives of the Canadian Armed Forces and Royal Canadian Mounted Police, members of the diplomatic corps, and youth representatives. Some of these groups place wreaths at the foot of the war memorial. The event is attended by between 25,000 and 45,000 people and is nationally televised.

Before each Remembrance Day ceremony, Public Works and Government Services Canada repairs and levels stones in the area of the war memorial, fill joints, waxes the bronzes, and applies a protective coating to the lettering on the Tomb of the Unknown Soldier. Plywood is placed over surrounding flower beds and approximately 6,000 metres (20,000 ft) of cable is run to connect sound systems and 12 television cameras. Any mementos or pictures attendees leave at the memorial following the ceremony are given to the Canadian War Museum for review and possible storage, while any money left is donated to The Perley & Rideau Veterans' Health Centre.

Whenever the monarch of Canada or another member of the royal family is in Ottawa, they will, regardless of the date, lay a wreath at the monument. Visiting foreign dignitaries will also sometimes lay a wreath at the monument; prominent figures who have done so include US President John F. Kennedy in 1961, Soviet Union leader Mikhail Gorbachev in 1990, US Secretary of State John Kerry, and French President François Hollande in 2014.

The Department of Canadian Heritage and the Department of Veterans Affairs also fund summer students at the site, hired to provide information on the site and its history.

== Design ==
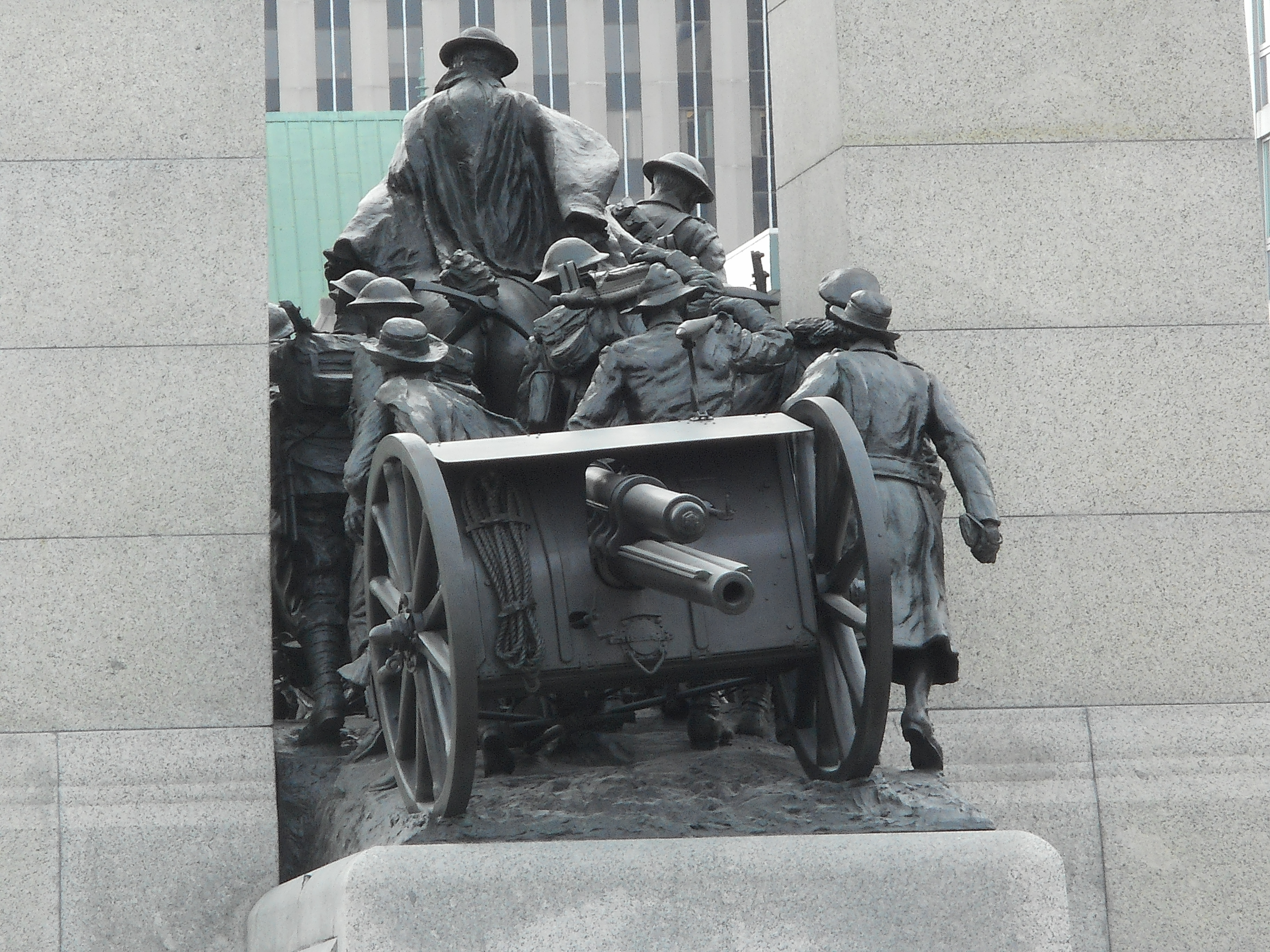
Figures viewed from the rear with QF 18-pounder gun

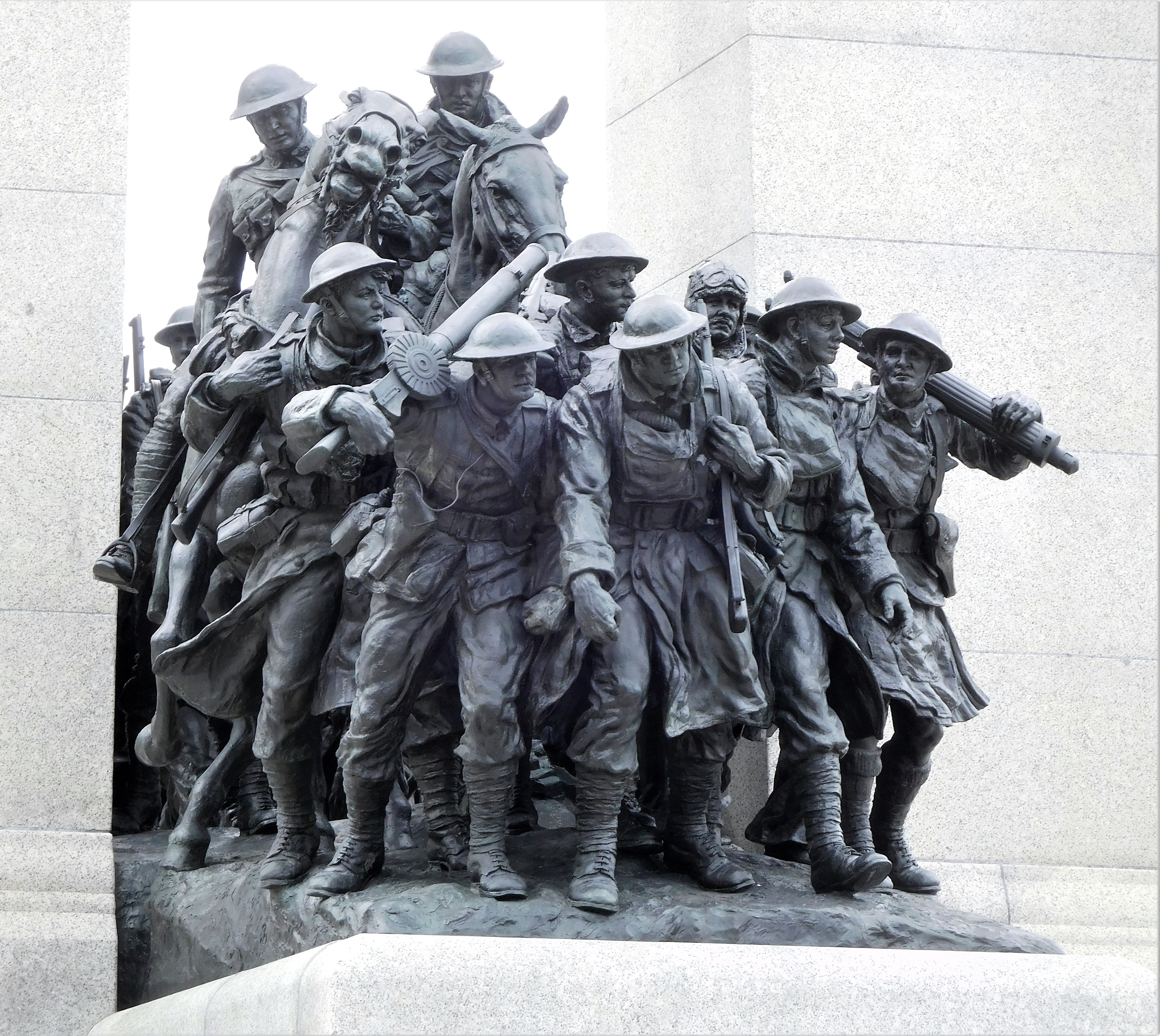
Figures viewed from the front

The memorial features 22 bronze figures, representing the eleven branches of the Canadian forces engaged in the First World War

The memorial, from grade to the tip of the surmounting statues' wings, is approximately 21.34 m (70 ft), with the arch itself 3.05 m (10 ft) wide, 2.44 m (8 ft) deep, and 8.03 m (26 ft 4 in) high. The lowest step of the pedestal is 15.9 m (52 ft 2 in) by 8.08 m (26 ft 6 in). 503 tonnes of rose-grey Canadian granite from the Dumas Quarry at Rivière-à-Pierre, Quebec, and 32 tonnes of bronze were used, all of which rests on a block of reinforced concrete based on steel columns set into bedrock.

Two 5.33-metre-high (17.5 ft) allegories of peace and freedom stand at the apex of the arch, their proximity to each other representing the inseparability of the two concepts, though, the figure bearing a torch alludes in Roman mythology to Demeter and the winged figure with a laurel depicts Nike, the Greek goddesses of agriculture and victory, respectively. Below are the depictions of 22 Canadian servicemembers from all branches of the forces and other groups engaged in the First World War. At the front, to the left, a Lewis gunner, to the right, a kilted infantryman with a Vickers machine gun. Following these are a pilot in full gear and an air mechanic of the Royal Canadian Air Force, as well as a sailor in the Royal Canadian Navy from HMCS Stadacona. Two mounted figures—a member of the Canadian Cavalry Brigade and a dispatch rider—are emerging from the arch, side by side, followed by two infantry riflemen pressing through the arch and behind them are the men and women of the support services, including two nurses from the Militia Army Medical Corps, a stretcher bearer, and one member each of the Royal Canadian Engineers and the Canadian Forestry Corps. The rear figures are pulling a QF 18-pounder gun. Further, there is one member each of the Canadian Army Service Corps, the Canadian Signals Corps, the Corps of Canadian Railway troops, the Royal Regiment of Canadian Artillery, and the Motor Machine Gun Corps. There are three additional infantrymen; all six carry among them respirators and other items of the "basic load" carried by every member of the infantry.

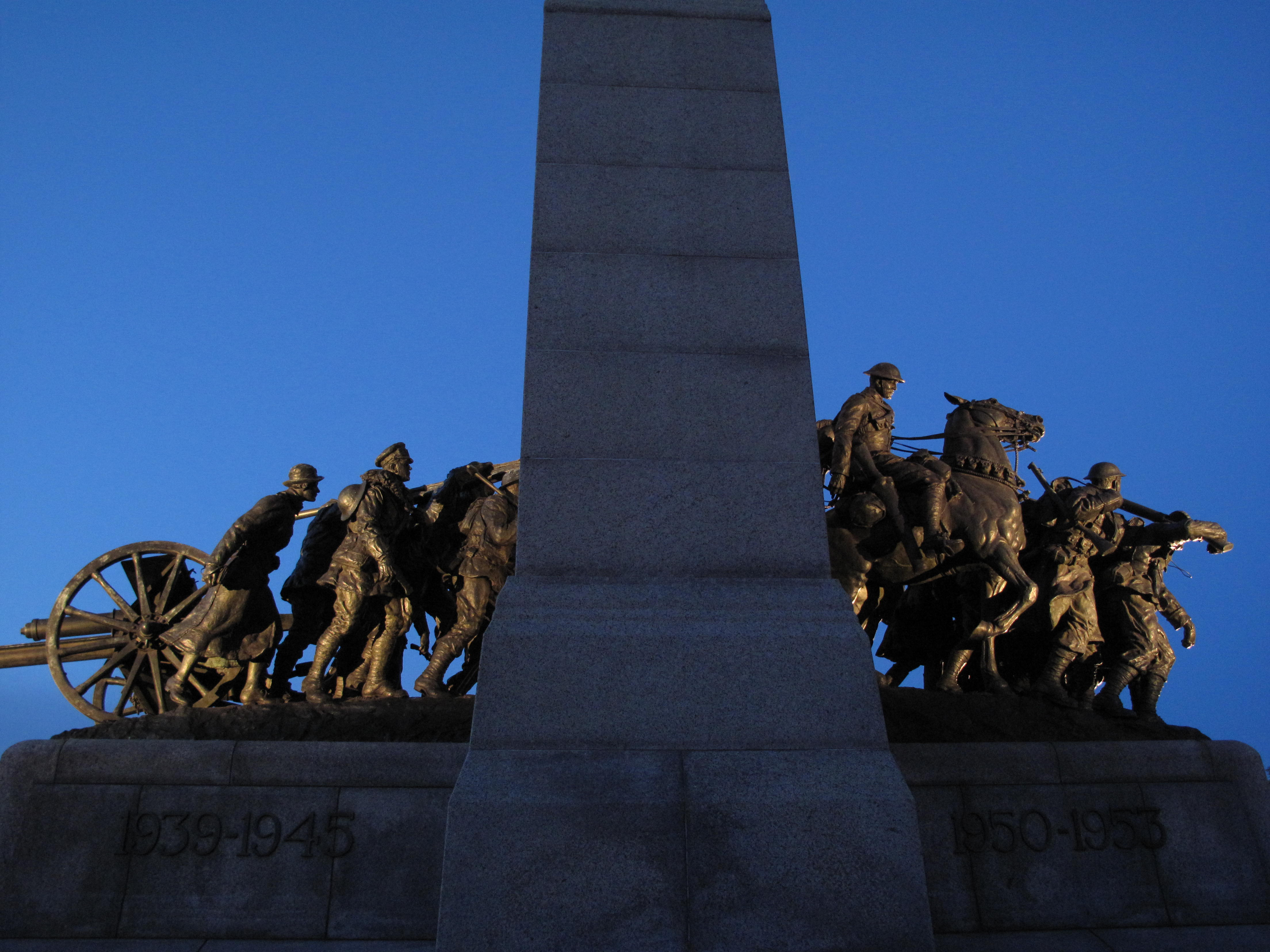
The memorial viewed from the west; the figures emerge through the arch from war to peace or in "the Great Response of Canada" to a call to war

The figures are moving towards the call of duty atop a pedestal. To avoid foreshortening from a pedestrian viewpoint, the group of figures is placed at a specific height above street level; each body is approximately 2.4 metres (7.9 ft) high, or one-third larger than life size. The postures are animated and strained, not in parade form, and the expressions "convey pride, longing, defiance, a strong sense of purpose, vacancy, camaraderie and perhaps a touch of dejection, but mostly firm resolve." All are in historically correct and distinctly Canadian uniforms, and they were deliberately rendered by the sculpture's artist, Vernon March, so as to not associate any with a particular region of the country nor any ethnicity or language, thus highlighting unity.

Of the memorial, March wrote "[I intend] to perpetuate in this bronze group the people of Canada who went Overseas to the Great War, and to represent them, as we of today saw them, as a record for future generations..." The allegorical representations of peace and freedom were meant to be seen "alighting on the world with the blessings of Victory, Peace and Liberty in the footsteps of the people's heroism and self-sacrifice who are passing through the archway below." The persons emerging through the arch have also been interpreted as representing Canada's "rite of passage" or "coming of age", its birth as a proper nation during the First World War, reflected in its attainment of a place in the negotiations of the Treaty of Versailles at the conflict's end. Similarly, the figures of Peace and Freedom "speak both to Canada's participation in the struggle to achieve lasting stability and democratic values that resulted in the creation of the League of Nations, and to the hope that in Canada itself peace and freedom may continue to triumph over the forces of instability and the tyrannies of ethnicity." Laura Brandon, Historian, Art & War at the National War Museum in Ottawa, opined that the agricultural connotations of the torch-bearing figure may have been intended by March to relate to the dominance of agriculture in Canada at the time of the monument's design. It may also refer to the line in the war poem In Flanders Fields, penned by John McCrae while in the battlefields of the First World War: "The torch; be yours to hold it high/If ye break faith with us who die."

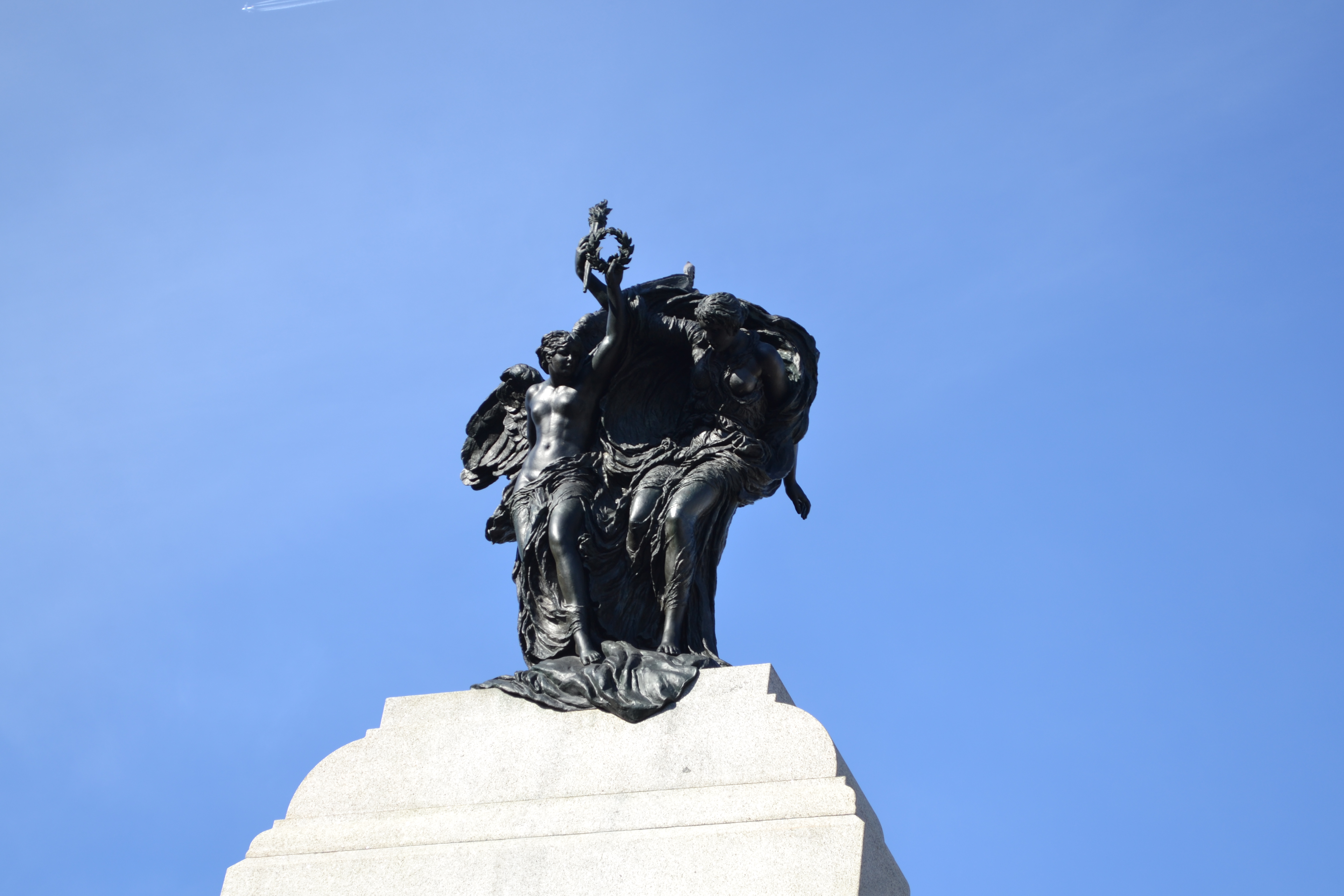
The allegorical statues symbolizing peace and liberty surmounts the memorial

On the north and south faces of the statuary base are the dates 1914–1918 (the First World War) above the words Service to Canada/Au service du Canada, which are intended to include all Canadians who served in all armed conflicts, past, present, and future. The dates 1939–1945 (the Second World War) and 1950–1953 (the Korean War) are on the east and west flanks of the base, while the years 1899–1902 (the Second Boer War) and 2001–2014 (the War in Afghanistan) are on the east and west arch pier footings, respectively. The Tomb of the Unknown Soldier rests in the podium surface immediately in front of and on axis with the war memorial.

== History ==
=== Conception and debate ===
The subject of a memorial to commemorate those killed in the First World War was raised even before the conflict had ended; Prime Minister Robert Borden said in 1915 "[i]t is my desire and intention that some splendid monument shall be erected in this country, perhaps in the capital of the Dominion, which will commemorate the men who responded so splendidly to the call of duty." There was opposition to the idea, mostly to its cost, especially as the argument continued through the Great Depression. The Lord Beaverbrook initiated, in partnership with the government, the Canadian War Memorial Fund (CWMF) in April 1918 with the purpose of "perpetuating the memory of what Canada has accomplished in this war" through paintings, photographs, and the erection of memorials. An early proposal in 1919 was a memorial hall in Ottawa, to act as a social centre for between 2,000 and 4,000 people as well as a monument to the Canadians who served in the Great War. It did not grow past the concept stage, but, an idea from the CWMF for a memorial building did progress to the detail design phase. It would have resembled the Pantheon in Rome and housed the art in the CWMF's collection while acting "as a great war memorial in itself." Immediately after the war's end, however, the focus shifted to the burial of the dead: the design of markers and headstones.

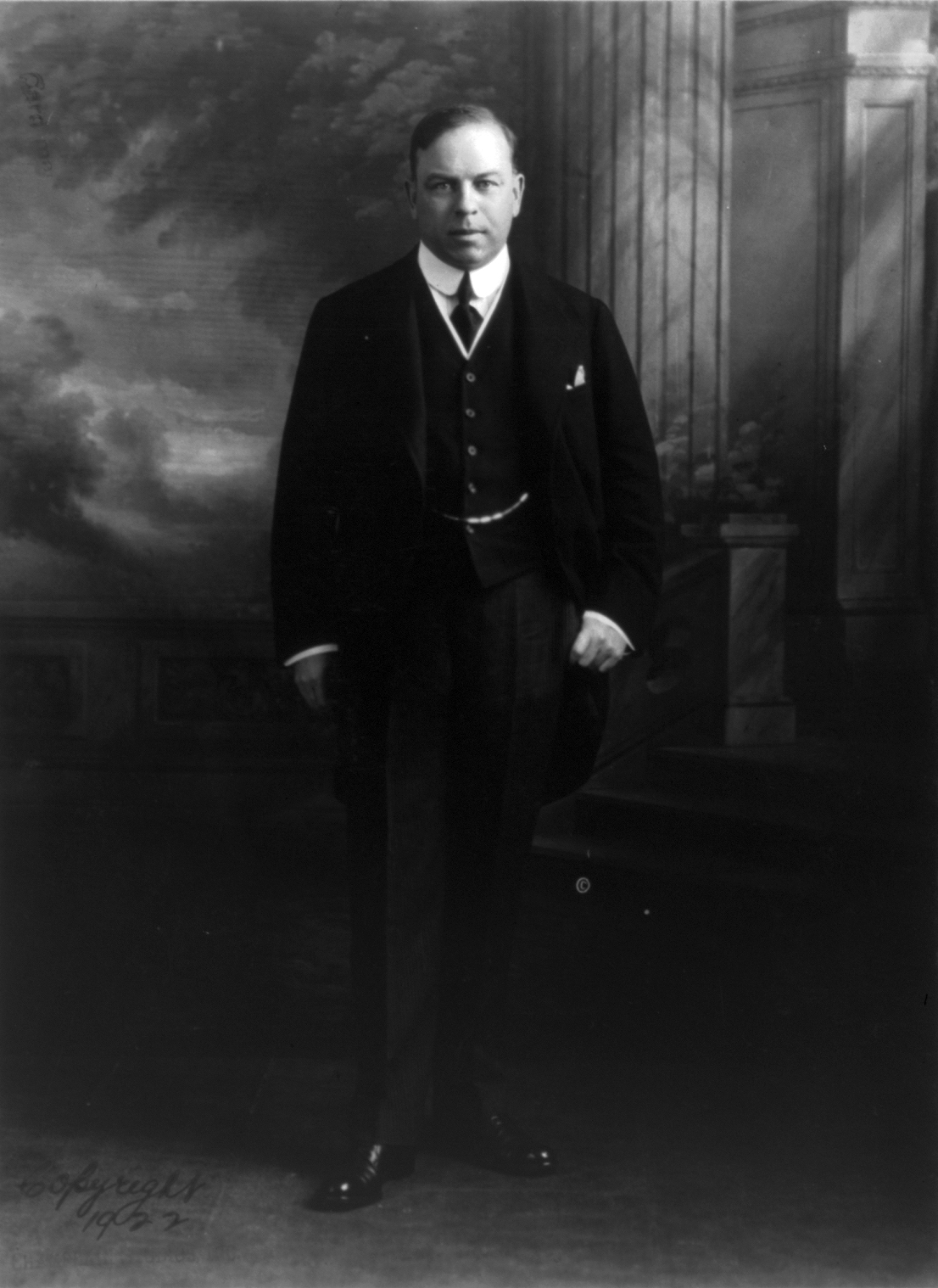
Prime Minister William Lyon Mackenzie King in 1922

To meet a growing call across Canada for a memorial to commemorate those who died in the First World War, the Cabinet of Prime Minister William Lyon Mackenzie King suggested in 1921 that a national memorial be built in Canada. The Ottawa Citizen on 19 December 1922 reported that the government was going to announce a plan to erect just such a monument and, in parliament on the last day of the session, the Cabinet requested appropriation for a war memorial to be built in Ottawa. A site in the Gatineau Hills was originally considered but it was determined the best option was the redevelopment and expansion of downtown Ottawa's Connaught Place into a plaza for the memorial, giving it the parliament buildings—the seat of Canadian democracy—as a backdrop. This, Mackenzie King later said, put it in the most visible spot in the city, akin to The Cenotaph and Nelson's Column in London, England.

In May 1923, the Minister of Public Works James Horace King asked the legislature to approve $10,000 for the memorial. However, with the minister unable to satisfactorily answer members' questions on what the money would be used for and the Prime Minister absent, it was determined to leave the matter for another time. Subsequently, the issue was again raised on 11 May 1923, when King stated "[i]n every country in the world the spirit of the nation has found some expression in regard to great events in the form of permanent monuments if the occasions have been sufficiently worthy of such recognition from the national point of view. The government felt that a monument should be erected in the capital of Canada expressive of the feelings of the Canadian people as a whole to the memory of those who had participated in the Great War and had lost their lives in the service of humanity." In response to a statement by Murray MacLaren that the central column of Confederation Hall (the main entrance) of the new Centre Block already had an inscription noting the service of Canadians who had fought overseas, Mackenzie King said the inscription made reference to many other events in Canadian history and, as such, was never meant to act as a national war memorial; he elaborated: "there is, as of yet, no monument of a national character in the capital of the Dominion" and what the Cabinet proposed was "intended to be a national monument in the national capital."

In further debate, it was said the project should strive for "something loftier than a monument in stone" and not reflexively "follow precedent, to follow ancient countries." Generally, the opposition was in favour of the idea, but criticized the projected costs. Mackenzie King responded: "When a nation loses what is signified by its art it loses its own spirit, and when it loses the remembrance of the sacrifices and heroism by which it has gained the liberty it enjoys, it loses all the vision that makes a people great." Indeed, the Prime Minister managed to force Members of Parliament who critiqued the idea of spending money on a memorial to defend their patriotism and gratitude for those who had died or been wounded in the war. Parliament approved $10,000 to begin the project.

=== Design and construction ===
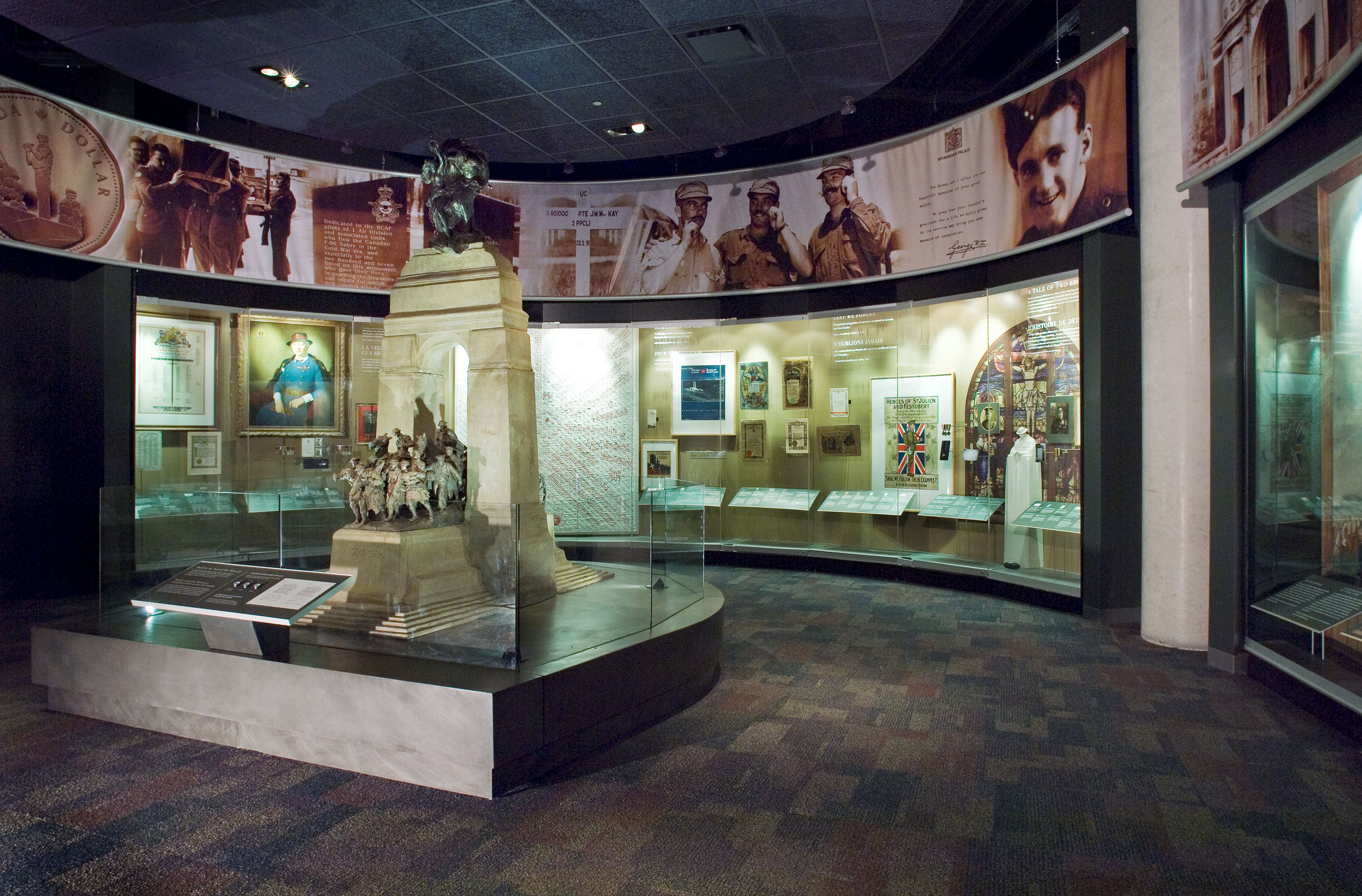
The original model submitted by Vernon March for the war memorial competition, on display at the Canadian War Museum.

Over two years, the parameters for the competition were created by a team consisting of, among others, the Deputy Minister of Public Works, J. B. Hunter, who had experience with the process of creating numerous memorials in Canada; Eric Brown, former Director of the National Gallery of Canada and a member of the Canadian War Artists Advisory Committee; and Colonel H. C. Osborne, who acted as Honorary Secretary of the Canadian Battlefields Memorials Commission. On 12 February 1925, design proposals were sought, with a budget for the monument set at $100,000. Entrants were limited to residents of the British Empire who were British subjects or who were citizens of allied nations. The competition regulations outlined the monument was intended to not be simply a tribute to those who contributed to Canada's effort in the First World War, but also an expression of the nation's character. It was to evoke "the spirit of heroism, the spirit of self-sacrifice, the spirit of all that is noble and great that was exemplified in the lives of those sacrificed in the Great War, and the services rendered by the men and women who went overseas." The competition brief explained "[w]hile the spirit of victory is essential it should be expressed so as to not only immortalize Canada's defenders but convey a feeling of gratitude that out of this great conflict a new hope has sprung for future prosperity under peaceful conditions." Absent from the document was a reference to the Empire, focusing only on Canada and its efforts. This illustrated the desire for the war memorial to be a marker of Canada's attainment of nationhood.

One hundred and twenty-seven entries were submitted—66 from Canada, 24 from England, 21 from France, seven from the United States, five from Belgium, two from Italy, one from Scotland, and one from Trinidad—of which seven were asked to provide scale models for final judging. Tasked with judging the proposals was the Board of Assessors, composed of three people drawn from Canada's architectural and artistic fields: Henry Sproatt was chosen by the Royal Architectural Institute of Canada; Herman A. MacNeil by the Royal Canadian Academy of Arts; and, by the Cabinet, chairman of the Board of Trustees of the National Gallery of Canada F.J. Shepherd. From among seven finalists, the winner, announced on 18 January 1926, was Vernon March from Farnborough, United Kingdom. His theme was the response of Canada to war, signified by the uniformed figures, in the then-correct order of precedence, passing through the arch, but with a deliberate aim to avoid the glorification of armed conflict. March wrote in his anonymous submission that the figures' expressions would not show any combative attitude. Rather, they would "express movement and the eagerness and enthusiasm of the people" to respond to the call.

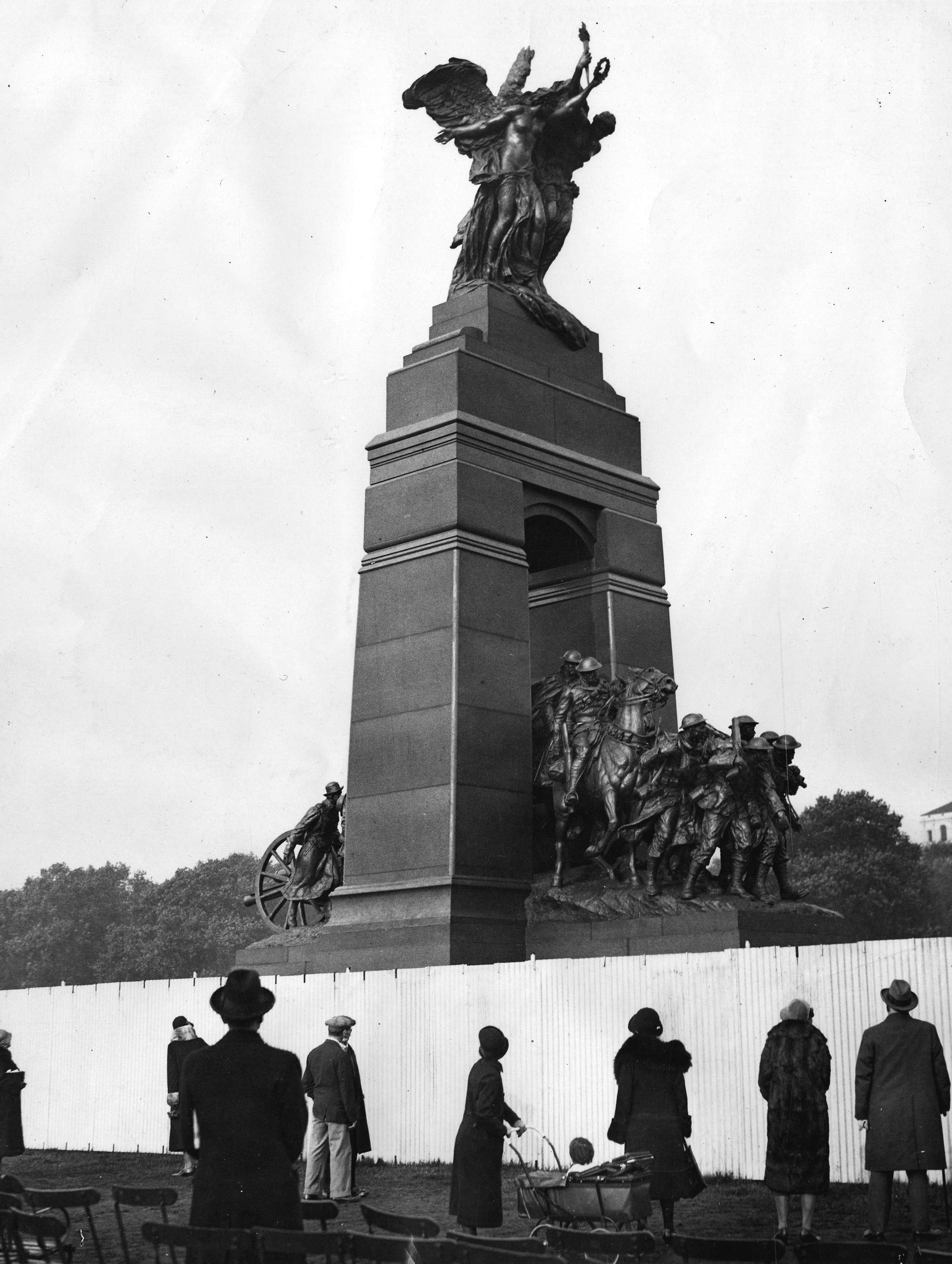
The sculptures on display in Hyde Park, London

Work on the memorial began in 1926 under the auspices of the Dominion's Department of Public Works. March was assisted by his six brothers and his sister, all of whom completed the work after March's death in 1930. His design was, over the ensuing years, revised and adjusted: the number of figures and certain dimensions increased and, accordingly, so did the estimated cost, by $85,000. This gave fuel to the parliamentary opposition, who argued the money could be better spent aiding veterans. Progressive Party Member of Parliament (MP) J. S. Woodsworth asserted in 1931: "[i]f there is a contract…we must go through with it... but with poor unemployed soldiers in the country, I do not think we shall need many monuments for a while."

Even through R. B. Bennett's tenure as prime minister (1930 to 1935), the officials overseeing the war memorial project continued to adhere to the design principles set out by Mackenzie King and the other competition directors, with bipartisan support for the memorial. As the accuracy of the uniforms and equipment—at March's request, down to details such as buttons and straps—was directed by Canadian officials, the sculptures were first produced in clay, from which moulds were made and the bronze was then cast in the Marchs' foundry. This work was finished in July 1932 and the bronzes were, with the permission of King George V, put on display in Hyde Park, London, within a mock-up of the granite arch and plinth. It was then that more than one member of the public pointed out that the archway was too narrow for the artillery carriage to pass through. This led the Marchs to make the arch 0.91 metres (3 ft) wider and 1.8 metres (6 ft) taller and enlarge the size of the plinth the figures would be mounted on. Those moves, though, created gaps on either side of the crowd of bronze statues, which Sydney March felt negatively impacted the overall appearance of the monument. His proposed solution was to add another three figures to the existing 19. This was approved, the bronze figures were cast, and the entire collection was put in storage at the Marchs' foundry as the argument continued in Ottawa over the monument's location.

Disapproval or blatant rejection of the Connaught Place site was expressed by the Federal District Commission (predecessor of the National Capital Commission), Mayor J. E. Stanley Lewis, social commentators, and journalists, as well as members of the public. Some groups demanded the war memorial be central on Parliament Hill, others said a spot overlooking the Ottawa River, west of parliament was more appropriate. Even the French architect Jacques Gréber, whom Mackenzie King (once again prime minister) had spoken to about the beautification of downtown Ottawa and was thought to be a supporter of the idea to put the war memorial in Connaught Place, penned a report on the redevelopment of Ottawa in which he recommended the monument be put in Major's Hill Park. However, after King pointed out that the park would not be as hospitable or accessible during the winter months, Gréber agreed and drew up plans for the Connaught Place site.

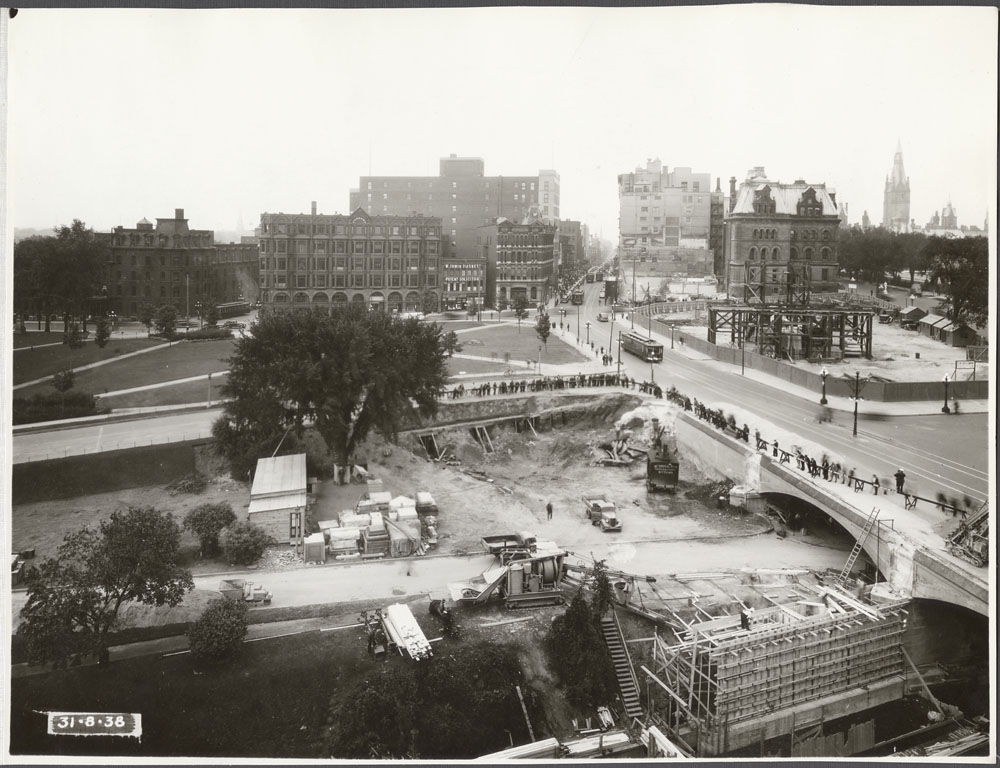
Construction of the National War Memorial takes place at far right, 31 August 1938

The bronzes were finally relocated to Ottawa in the summer of 1937, accompanied by Sydney, Percival, and Walter March. In December, after years of bickering, the contract for the construction of the pedestal and arch was awarded to E.G.M. Cape and Company of Montreal. The entire cenotaph was completed on 19 October 1938, after which the landscaping surrounding the memorial was laid out and installed by Toronto contractors A.W. Robertson Limited with consultation from Gréber. The cost by that point had risen to over $1,300,000. Conservative MP Alonzo Hyndman quipped: "if those soldiers were to come back to-day and look at the memorial... and realize that $1,300,000 was being spent on it, while [their] sons and daughters... are walking the streets of Ottawa hungry, barefoot and without jobs... No wonder the sculptor has depicted the soldiers going through the arch with their heads hanging down, as though perplexed at what is going on." Still, the figures of peace and freedom were placed atop the granite arch on the same day the Munich Agreement was signed in Germany. Mackenzie King was optimistic: "Canada will remember throughout her history, that these two symbolical figures found their place at the top of the National Memorial on September the 30th, the day of the signing of the 4-power agreement which averted another Great War."

=== Dedication and onward ===
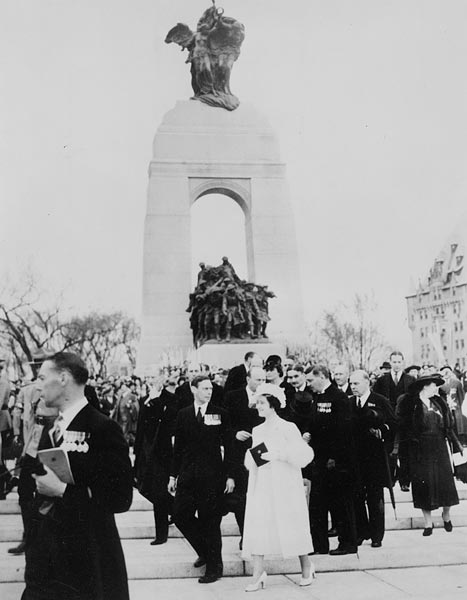
The dedication of the memorial by King George VI in 1939 during his Royal Tour

The memorial was officially dedicated on 21 May 1939 by King George VI, the then-reigning Canadian monarch, in the presence of Elizabeth, the queen-consort, Governor General the Lord Tweedsmuir, and Mackenzie King, with an estimated 100,000 people, including some 12,000 veterans, attending. The site was decorated with banners depicting the heraldic elements of the Royal Arms of Canada. In his speech, the King focused on Canada having, through defending decency and democracy, reached nationhood among other Western countries. He said: "On the battlefields of Europe and throughout the Dominion, there are many memorials to Canada's honoured dead. Today, in her own capital, Canada dedicates her national memorial. [It] speaks to the world of Canada's heart... Something deeper than chivalry is portrayed. It is the spontaneous response of the nation's conscience. The very soul of the nation is here revealed." After the formal ceremony, the King and his wife made their way to talk to gathered veterans. After doing so, the cheering crowd broke through military and police lines to "greet them [the King and Queen] personally as fellow citizens"; reporters noted that a king and queen had never before "walked unescorted in the midst of such a multitude." It is thought that "O Canada" became the de facto national anthem after the King remained at attention during its playing at the dedication of the National War Memorial; George, though, was actually following a precedent set by his brother, Edward, the previous king of Canada, when he dedicated the Canadian National Vimy Memorial in France in 1936.

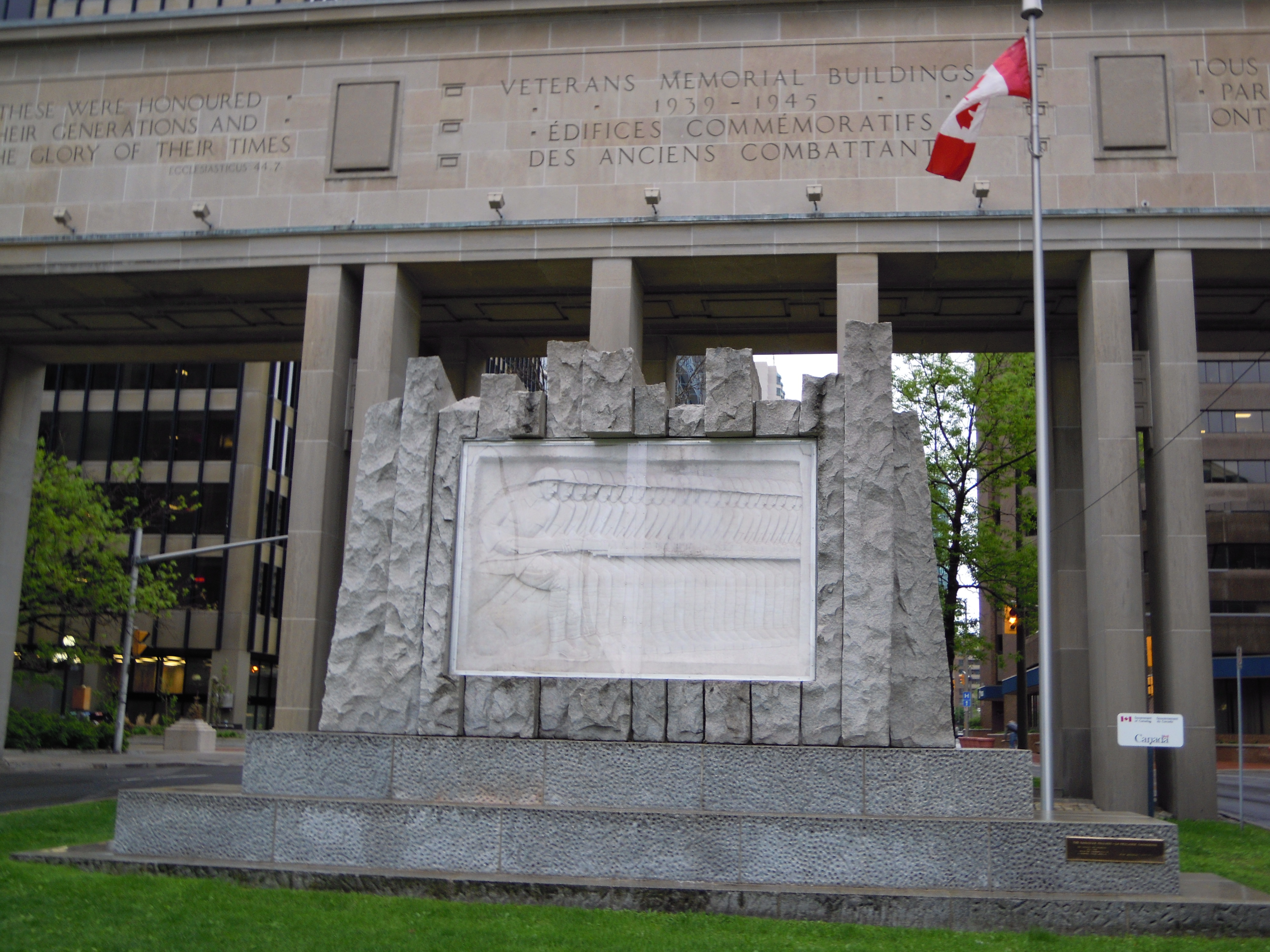
The lintel between the East and West Memorial Buildings, bearing the inscription: ALL THESE WERE HONOURED IN THEIR GENERATIONS AND WERE THE GLORY OF THEIR TIMES

Despite the joyous environment, Mackenzie King felt the monument's allusions to the sacrifice required for peace and freedom would soon take on greater force: he and the King both were now certain another war was looming. They were proven correct and after Canada became involved in further military conflict in and after September 1939, the symbolism of the National War Memorial came into question. While the monument in Ottawa was unofficially becoming a symbol of Canada's dead in all of the wars it fought in, the Royal Canadian Legion argued that new memorials should be created to mark the service of Canada's military in the Second World War and Korean War; the problem with The Response, they argued, was "the heroic figures of our present National War Memorial portray Canada's fighting men of the First World War so faithfully as to render it unsuitable as a memorial to our fallen in World War II and the Korean War." In 1947, Jacques Gréber, who continued to work on the development and beautification of Ottawa, designed a traditional monument to the Canadians who died in the Second World War, locating it in the Gatineau Hills, in a manner similar to the Vimy memorial in France and visible from downtown Ottawa. After veterans' groups complained the location would be difficult for tourists to reach, Gréber suggested placing the dates 1939–1945 on The Response. Veterans found that unacceptable, as well, insisting that monument was to commemorate the dead of the First World War only. The federal government stated before the close of the Korean War that the East and West Memorial Buildings on Wellington Street would serve as a commemoration of the Canadian men and women who served in the Second World War; a lintel was built between the two structures and on it placed the inscription: ALL THESE WERE HONOURED IN THEIR GENERATIONS AND WERE THE GLORY OF THEIR TIMES. Veterans' groups were again unsatisfied. In a brief given by the Royal Canadian Legion to the Cabinet on 10 November 1955, it was outlined that the organization wanted a national cenotaph, that would "honour the fallen of all wars", placed in front of the Peace Tower.

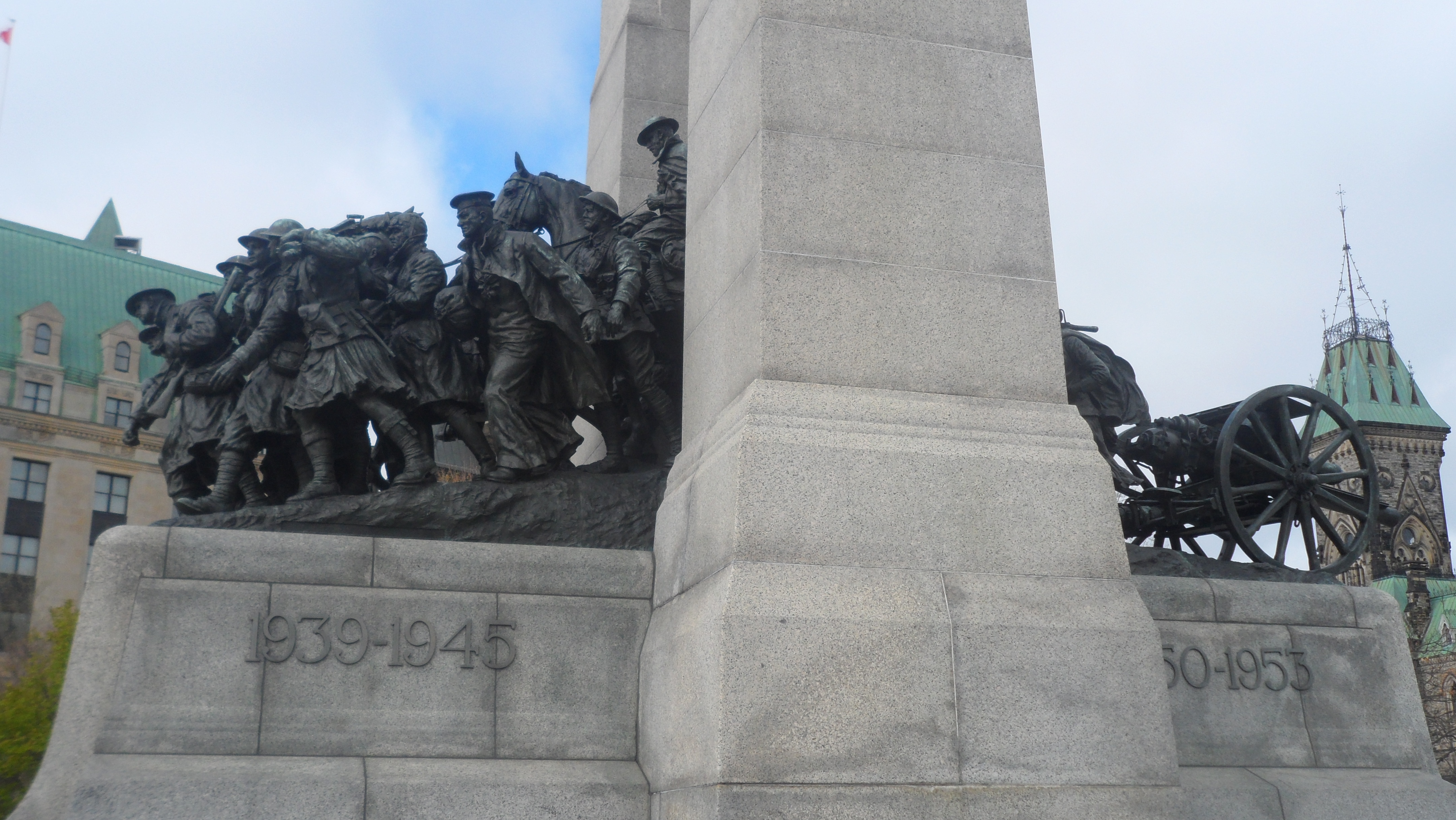
The years 1939–1945 and 1950–1953 on the base of the memorial.

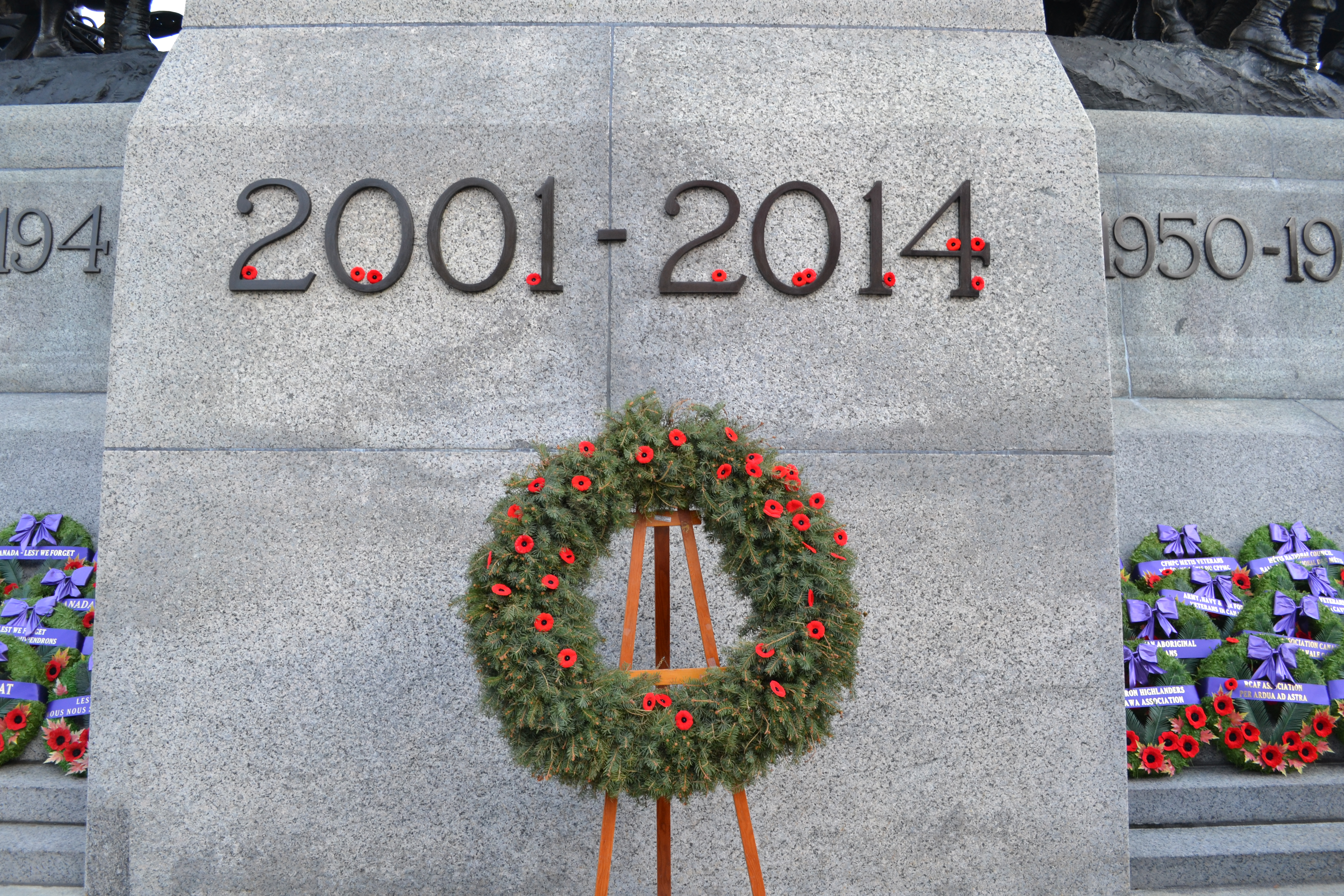
The years 2001–2014 on the base of the memorial

Years commemorating service members from other conflicts were added onto the memorial in May 1982 and November 2014

In 1963, the matter became more prominent when John Diefenbaker's Progressive Conservative Cabinet announced a plan to have a national shrine of remembrance built at Nepean Point to house the Books of Remembrance and a cenotaph to commemorate "the service and sacrifice of the veterans and war dead of all wars." Architects from Toronto and Quebec City were asked by the Cabinet to draw up plans for such a memorial complex and the announcement was made on 19 February 1963 by the Progressive Conservative Minister of Public Works, Davie Fulton, that the project would be completed for the Canadian Centennial in 1967. However, this plan never came to fruition, as it was denounced by some of the media, various organizations, veterans, a large number of Canadians, and eventually parliamentarians, in the by then governing Liberal Party. The meaning of the war memorial in Confederation Square had shifted in the public consciousness; through its location in downtown Ottawa, renovations to Confederation Square to further highlight The Response, and its constant use as a site for national Remembrance Day services (especially through the Second World War, as Canadians were dying overseas), it had come to represent in the Canadian collective consciousness all of Canada's war dead.

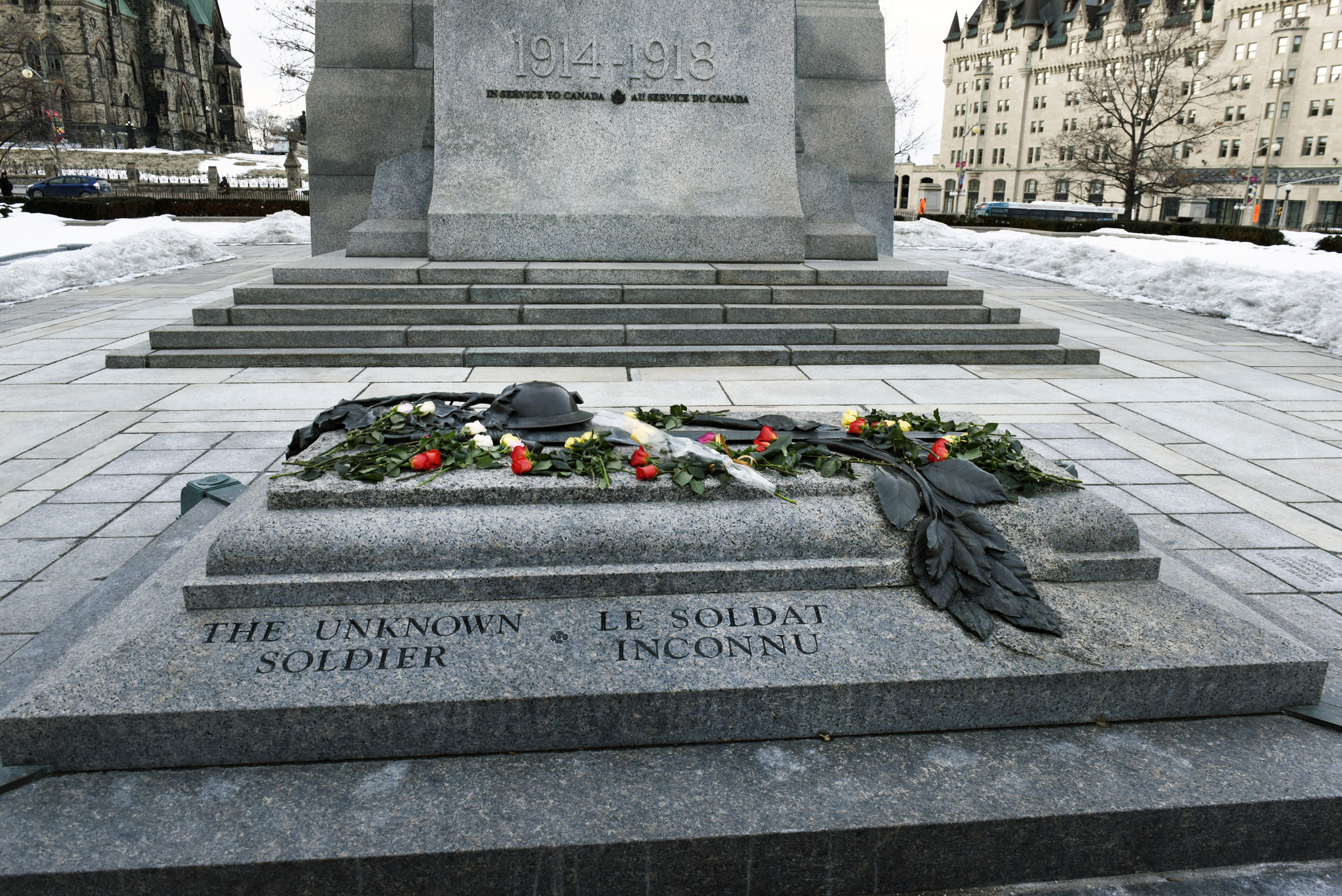
The Tomb of the Unknown Soldier was installed next to the monument in 2000.

The Royal Canadian Legion requested in 1980 that the Crown rededicate the National War Memorial so as to formally recognize the sacrifices of those who had fought in the Second World and Korean Wars. Wishing to not repeat the confusion and problems around the national shrine of remembrance, the then Minister of Veterans Affairs, Dan MacDonald, almost immediately agreed to the proposal. The monument was re-dedicated on 29 May 1982 by Governor General Edward Schreyer, with the dates 1939–1945 and 1950–1953 added. the Tomb of the Unknown Soldier was added before the monument in 2000 and dedicated by Governor General Adrienne Clarkson on 28 May of that year.

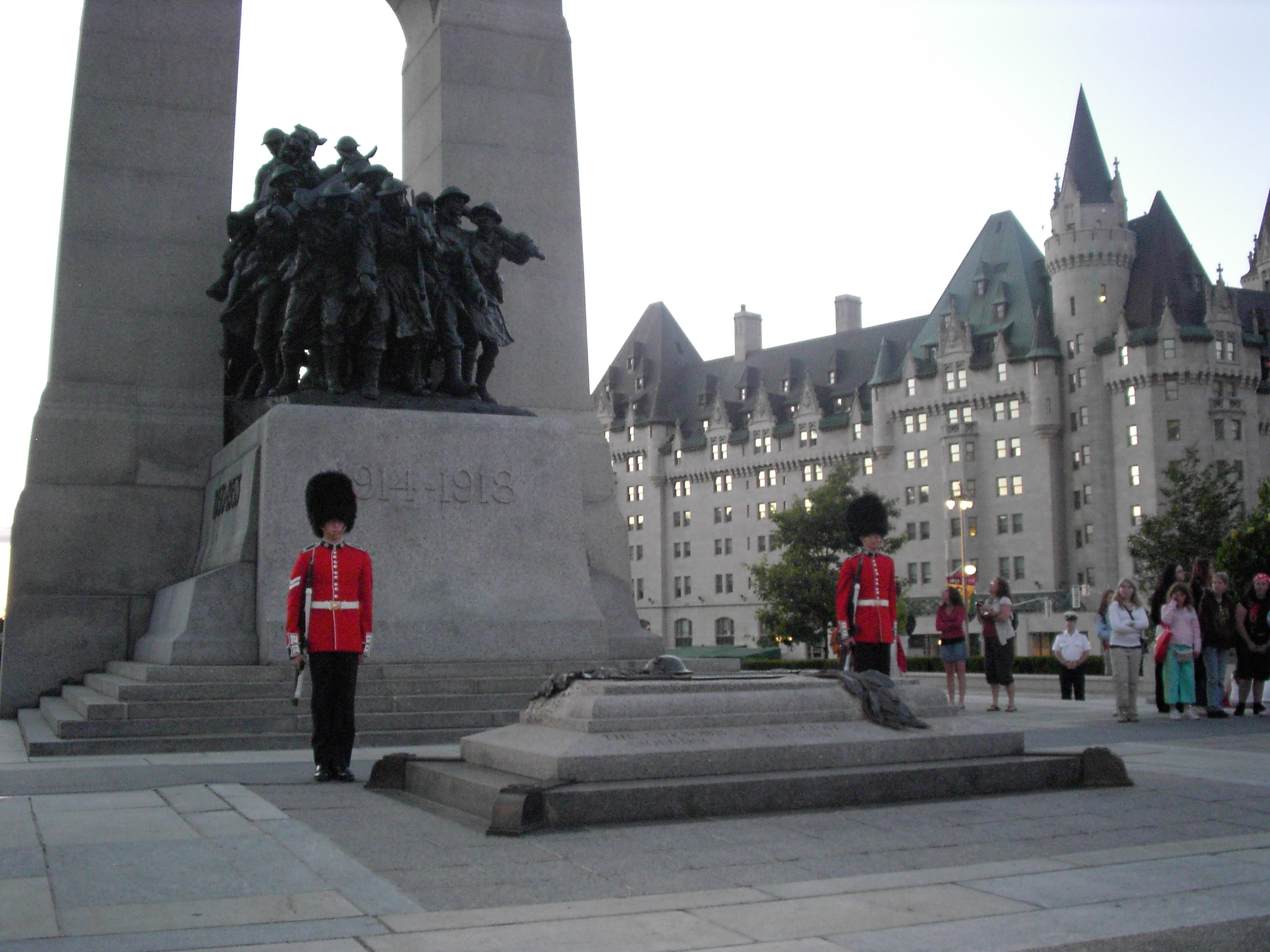
Sentries from the Ceremonial Guard at the National War Memorial in 2007

In 2006, Dr. Michael Pilon, a retired Canadian Forces major, observed and photographed a group of young men urinating on the war memorial on the evening of Canada Day. Two teenagers later issued apologies and undertook community service. Another 23-year-old man of Montreal was charged with mischief by the Ottawa Police Service, though he later claimed to have no memory of the event. The incident, along with the common sight of persons skateboarding and riding bicycles on the memorial's podium, prompted the posting of sentries at the site, though they are only present between 9 am and 5 pm from 9 April to 10 November.

On 11 November 2014, the representation of the National War Memorial itself was also expanded to include those who served in the Second Boer War and the War in Afghanistan, and to "formally recognize all Canadians who served in the past, who serve today, and who will serve in the future." In that respect, the dates "1899–1902" (of the Boer War) and "2001–2014" (covering Canadian involvement in the Afghan War) were added to the monument.

=== 2014 shooting ===
A series of shootings occurred at Parliament Hill and in its vicinity on the morning of 22 October 2014, during which Michael Zehaf-Bibeau fatally shot Corporal Nathan Cirillo, a Canadian soldier who was one of three ceremonial sentries on duty at the National War Memorial that morning. Cirillo was mentioned by Governor General David Johnston in his speech during the Remembrance Day ceremony that same year, when the Governor General and Princess Anne, Princess Royal (who brought a message from Queen Elizabeth II), re-dedicated the monument once again. A plaque commemorating Cirillo's service at the War Memorial was dedicated at the site.

== Commemoration ==
On 15 May 1939, the Post Office Department issued a stamp called National Memorial, designed by Herman Herbert Schwartz based on a picture engraved by Joseph Keller. The Royal Canadian Legion also offers lapel pins depicting the monument.

The original model that was submitted by Vernon March for the war memorial competition is held by the Canadian War Museum, and is exhibited in the museum's Royal Canadian Legion Hall of Honour; a gallery that explores how Canadian conflicts have been commemorated or memorialized throughout history.

== See also ==
- Canadian war memorials
- List of Korean War memorials
- Lists of war monuments and memorials
- List of World War I monuments and memorials
- World War I memorials
