= Bell Block (Ottawa) =

Coordinates: 45.42334°N 75.69579°W

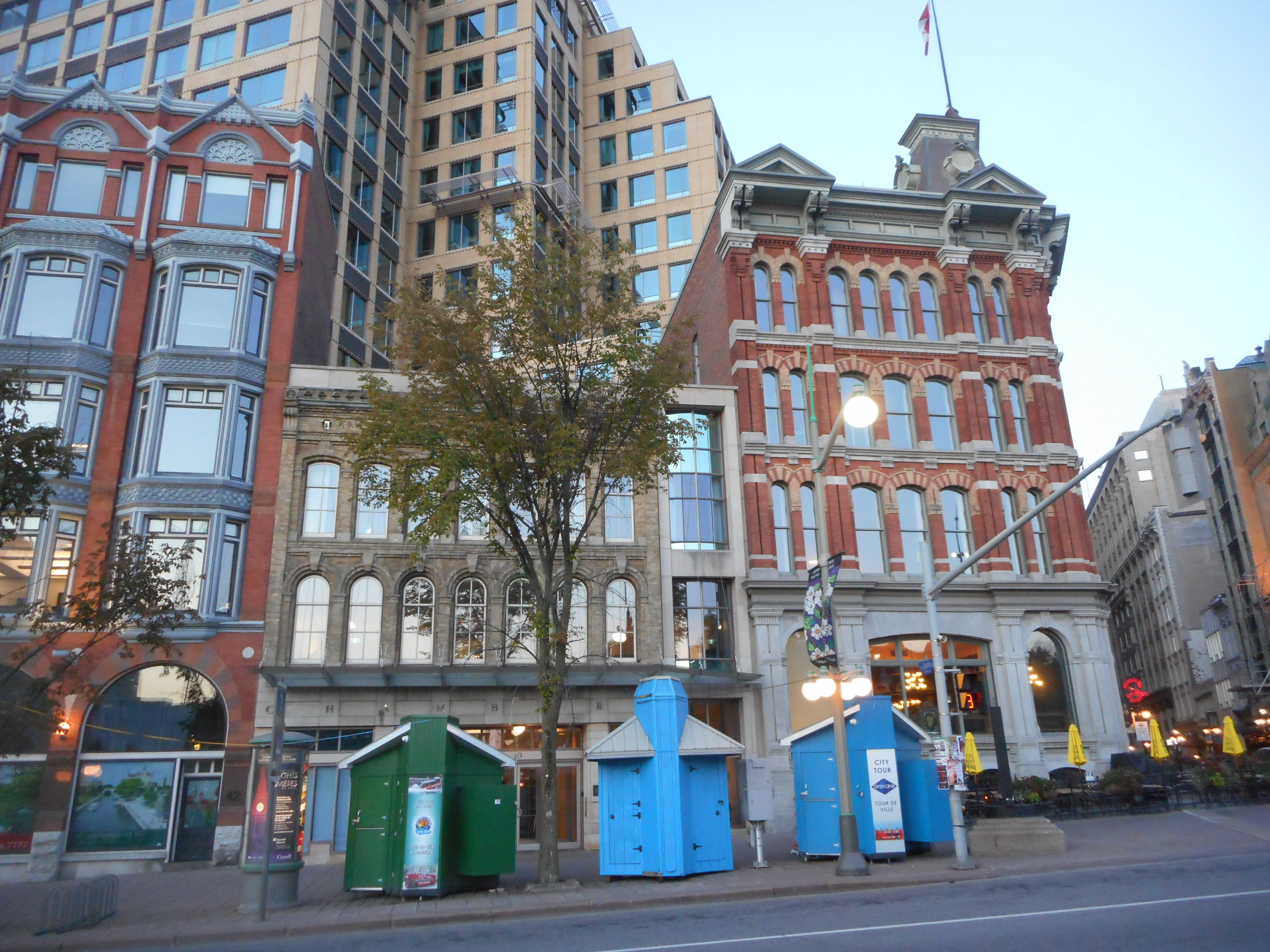
Bell Block, 40 Elgin Street, Ottawa

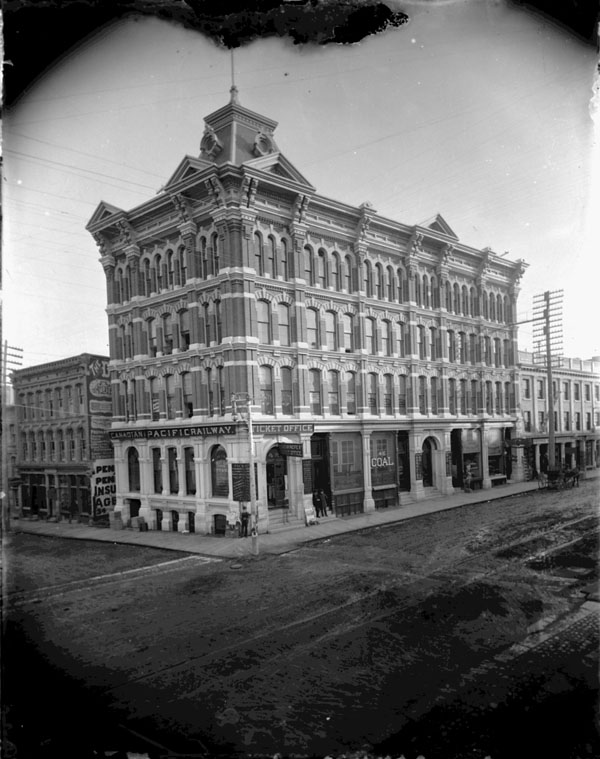
Bell Block on the left

Bell Block is a building in Ottawa, Ontario, Canada. It is located on 40 Elgin Street between the Central Chambers and Scottish Ontario Chambers. It was built in 1867 to a design by William Hodgson (1827–1904). It gets its name from the original owner, John George Bell. Designated as a heritage property under Part IV of the Ontario Heritage Act, it was honoured with an "Award of Excellence" from the City of Ottawa.

== Occupants ==
After the building was constructed, it was used by John George Bell and his business partner Alexander Smith Woodburn for their job printing business (Bell & Woodburn). Bell, the owner of the building, retired in 1872, and the business was continued by Woodburn. In 1885, Woodburn established the Ottawa Evening Journal, which was printed from this building until January 1914.
