= Pretoria Bridge =

Table bridge in Ottawa, Canada

Coordinates: 45.41149°N 75.68345°W

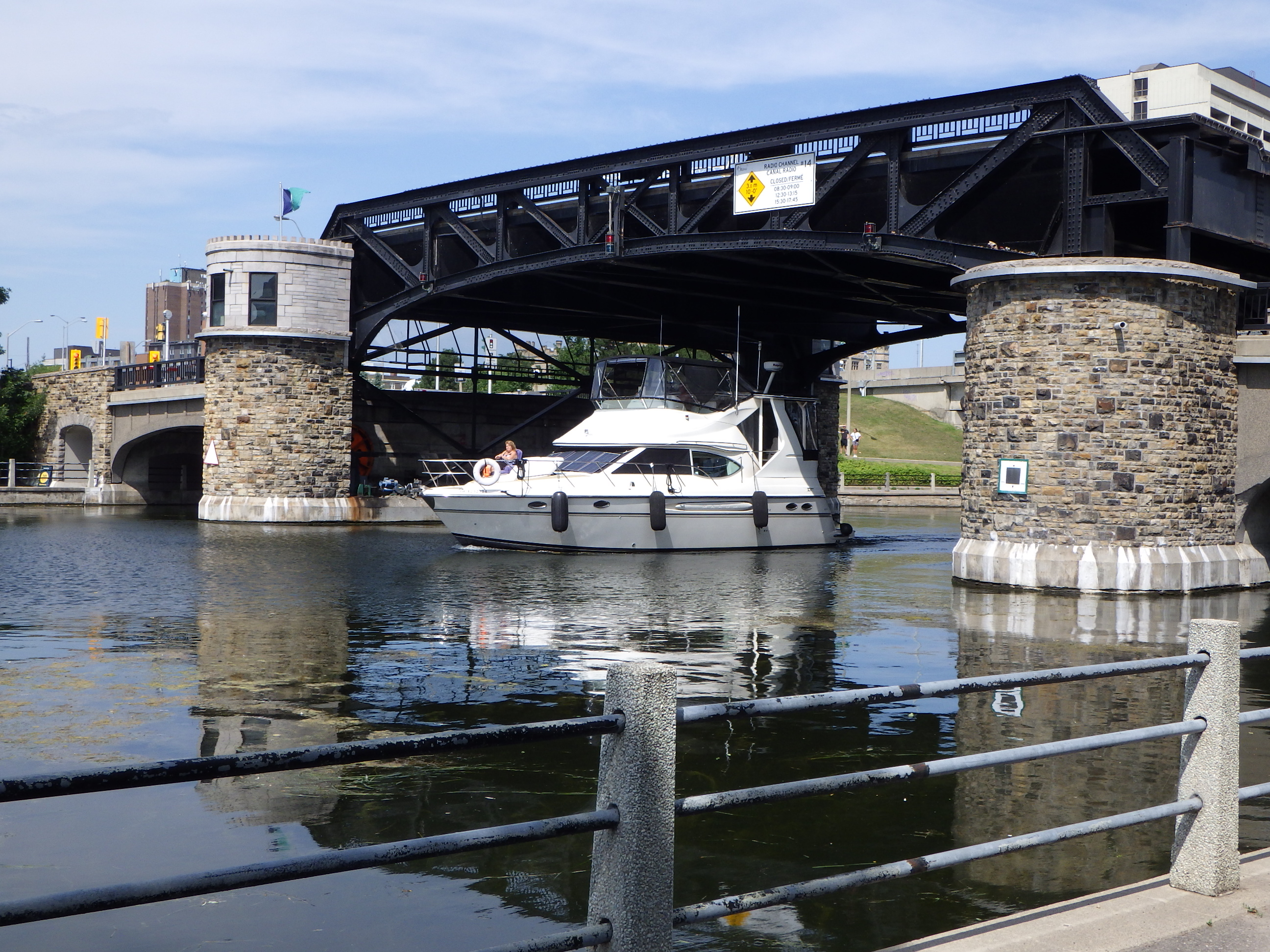
Pretoria Bridge

The Pretoria Bridge is a table bridge in Ottawa, Ontario, Canada. It crosses the Rideau Canal linking the Glebe and Centretown to Old Ottawa East. The bridge was built in 1915, replacing an earlier wooden swing bridge on Argyle Street just to the north. It is a table bridge, meaning that the central portion of the bridge can be elevated to allow boats to pass underneath. Although built by the Strauss Bascule Bridge Company, the moveable span is not a bascule type but a table-type.

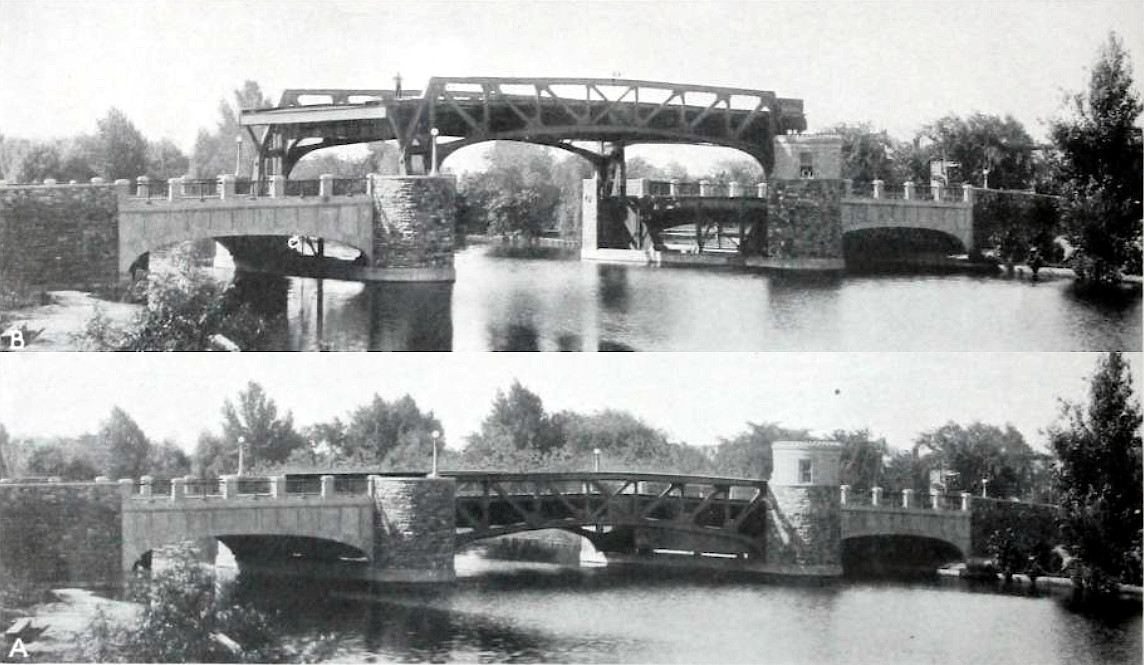
Pretoria Bridge in raised and lowered position

In the late 1970s it was discovered that road salt had seriously damaged the bridge. Proposals were advanced to build a larger and higher bridge, but these were opposed by those who saw the bridge as a heritage structure. Eventually it was decided to rebuild the bridge almost exactly as it had been before.

The bridge shares its name with nearby Pretoria Avenue. Pretoria Avenue, formerly Jane Street, was renamed in 1902 to commemorate the British victory in the Second Boer War and those Canadians that had served. The name comes from the captured Boer capital, Pretoria. The name later become controversial as most Canadians associated it with the apartheid regime in South Africa. In the late 1980s a movement was launched to rename the bridge after Nelson Mandela. This was opposed by others who felt it was an important monument to Canadians who had fought in South Africa. City council refused to get involved and the proposal eventually died.
