= Elgin Street (Ottawa) =

Street in Ottawa, Ontario, Canada

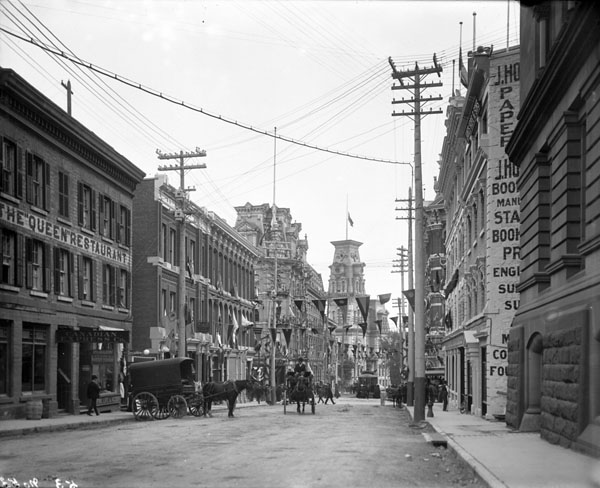
View along Elgin Street looking south towards the city hall, in September 1901

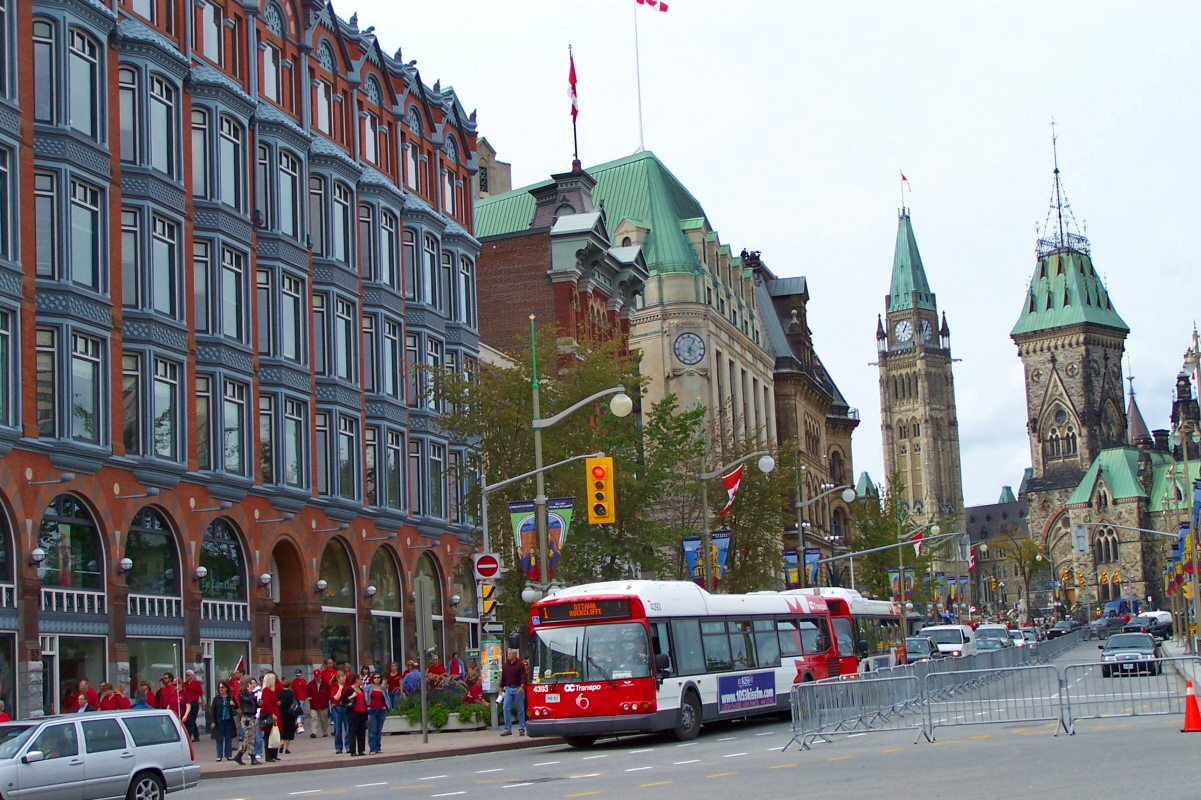
The historic northernmost section of Elgin Street, looking north towards Parliament Hill, 2006

Elgin Street (/ˈɛlɡɪn/ EL-ghin; Ottawa Road #91) is a street in the Downtown core of Ottawa, Ontario, Canada. Originally named Biddy's Lane, it was later named after Lord Elgin.

The north/south running street begins at Wellington Street in Confederation Square, just east of the Parliament buildings and just west of the bridge over the Rideau Canal. In the centre of Elgin Street for the first two blocks is Confederation Square, home of Canada's National War Memorial. To the south of this on the east of Elgin is the National Arts Centre; to the west is the British High Commission. Continuing south, Elgin is fronted by Confederation Park to the east and the Lord Elgin Hotel to the west. South of the park, just past Laurier Avenue, is the Ottawa Court House, across from the First Baptist Church and Grant house (1875 mansion), followed by City Hall (former Regional Municipality of Ottawa-Carleton Headquarters) and Knox Presbyterian Church.

South of this, the street becomes mainly a business area, home to a number of stores, restaurants, and bars. Progressing south, the street steadily becomes more residential, home to low rise apartment buildings. Elgin ends at the Queensway, where it turns into Hawthorne Avenue before turning east and going over the Rideau Canal at the Pretoria Bridge. At the southern end of Elgin is the headquarters of the Ottawa Police Service.

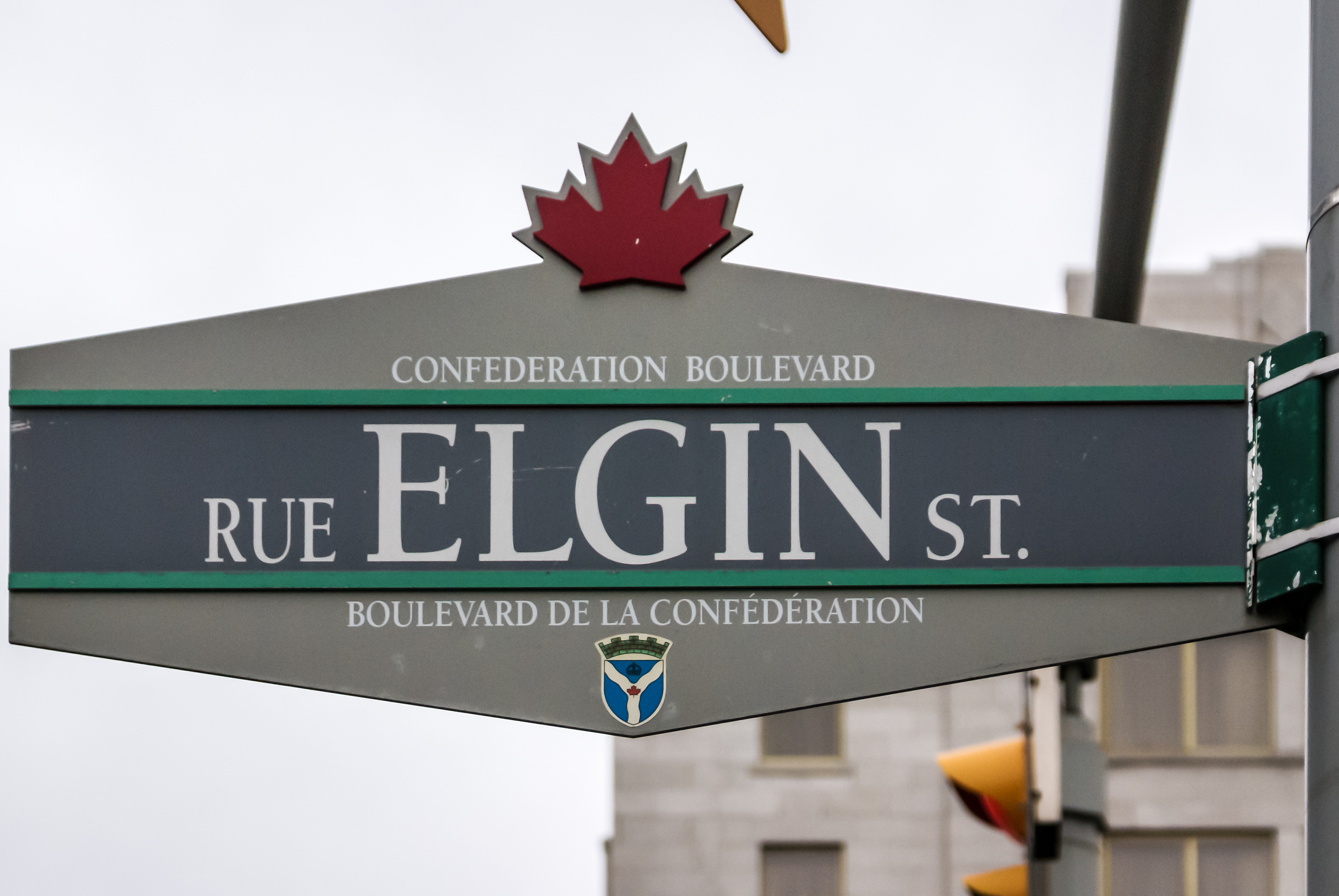
Street sign where Elgin Street is part of Confederation Boulevard

The street is now nicknamed "Sens Mile", similar to the Red Mile in Calgary and the Blue Mile in Edmonton - a street for Ottawa Senators celebrations in the 2007 Stanley Cup Playoffs. The plan originated as a grassroots campaign upon realization that the home of the Ottawa Senators, Canadian Tire Centre is located 30 minutes west of the city's downtown core in the suburb of Kanata.

In June 2010 a life size bronze statue of the Canadian jazz pianist Oscar Peterson was unveiled at the corner of Elgin and Albert Streets by Queen Elizabeth II during her royal tour of Canada.

As of November 2011, the former National Art Gallery at 90 Elgin is being torn down to be replaced with a new 17 storey (8 floors on Elgin) office building that will house the Federal Finance Department. Furthermore, behind Grant House and First Baptist Church at 150 Elgin, there was a 23-floor (300 ft) office building called "Performance Court" under construction.

From January 7, 2019 to December 16, 2019 Elgin Street between Somerset and Catherine Streets was closed to vehicle traffic as part of a revitalization project. Construction occurred between Gloucester and Isabella Streets. Project planning began in 2018 and on November 27, 2020 the city announced construction was officially completed. The project included sewer and water main replacement, burying overhead utility lines, adding bike lanes at the south end, new bus shelters, widening the sidewalks, lane reduction to two lanes with traffic calming measures, public art installations and the creation of a public square (Boushey Square). Boushey Square hosts the weekly Elgin Street Market in the summer months.
