= Scottish Ontario Chambers =

Coordinates: 45.4236492°N 75.6958526°W

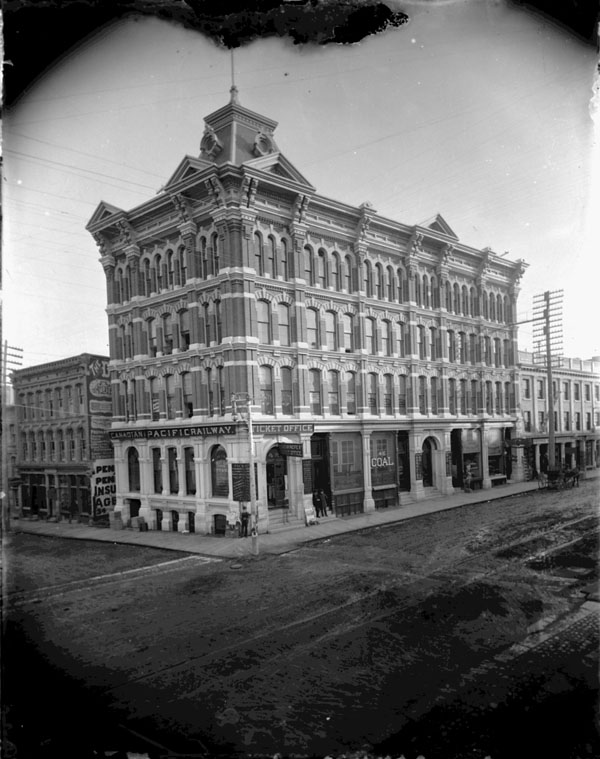
Scottish Ontario Chambers (was Canadian Pacific Railway Office) around turn of the century. Bell block is on the left.

The Scottish Ontario Chambers is a building in Ottawa at the corner of Sparks Street and Elgin Street that was built in 1883. It was designed by William Hodgson. It is designated as a heritage property under Part IV of the Ontario Heritage Act.

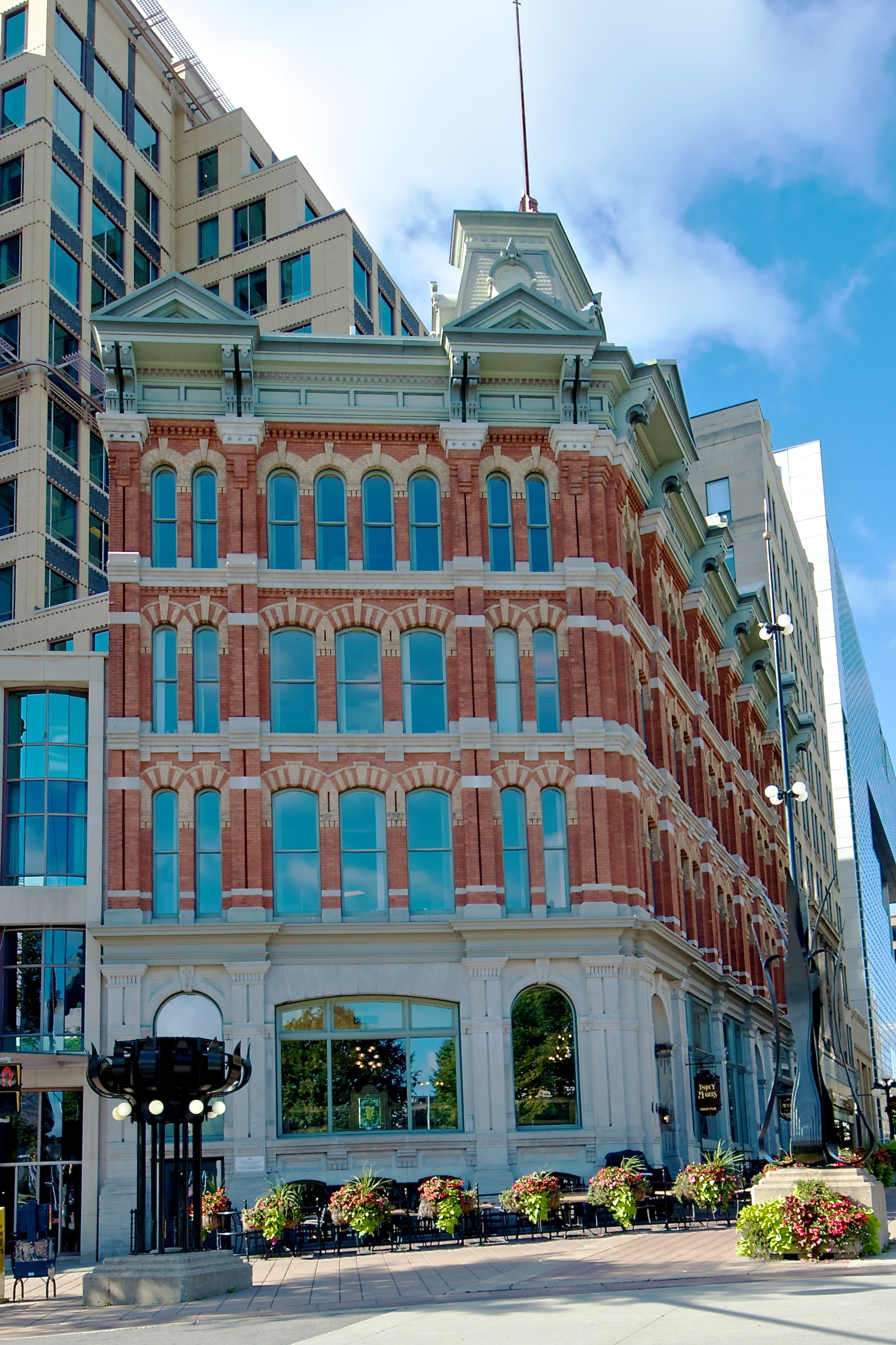
Elgin Street

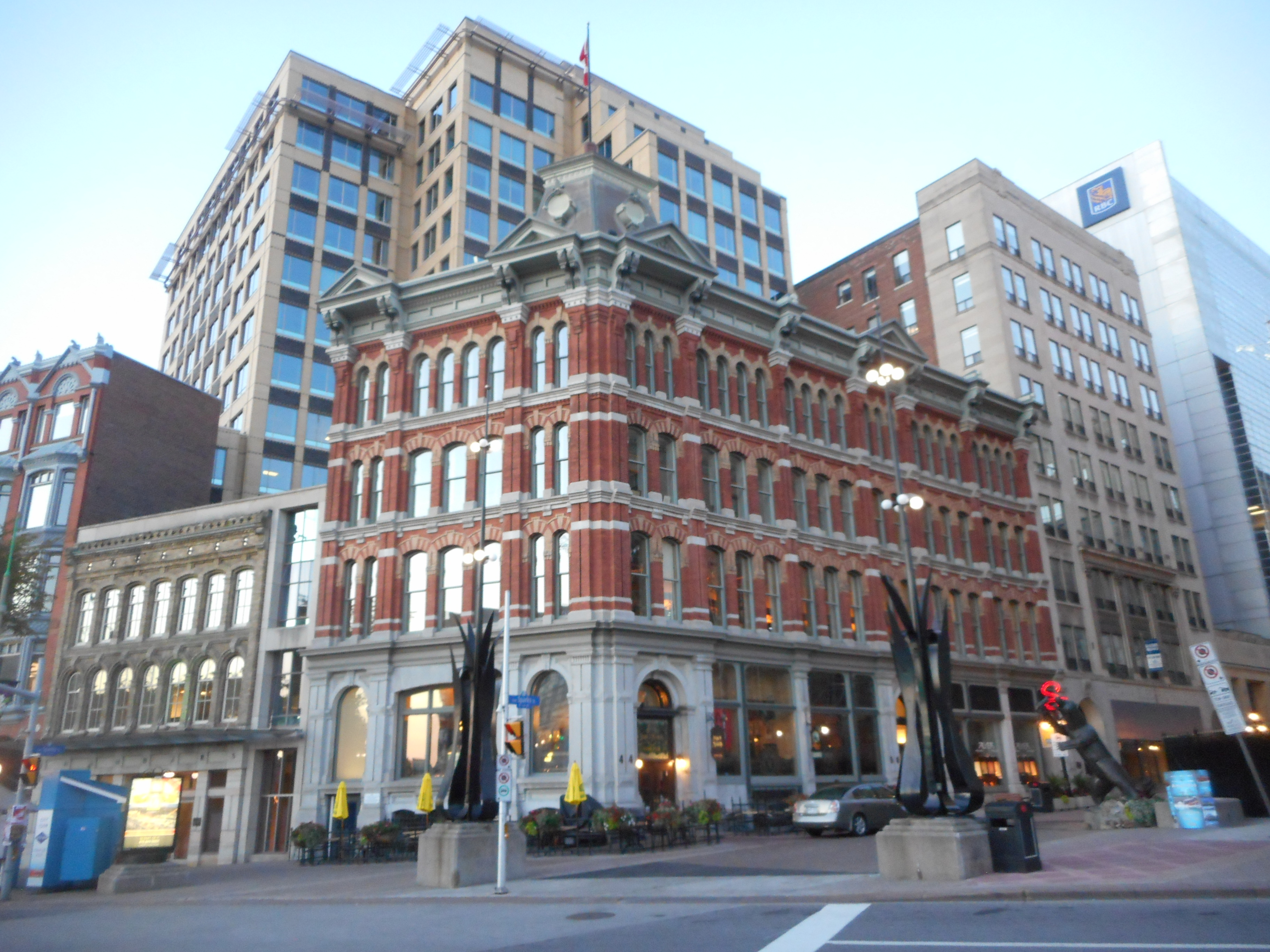
Corner Elgin and Sparks

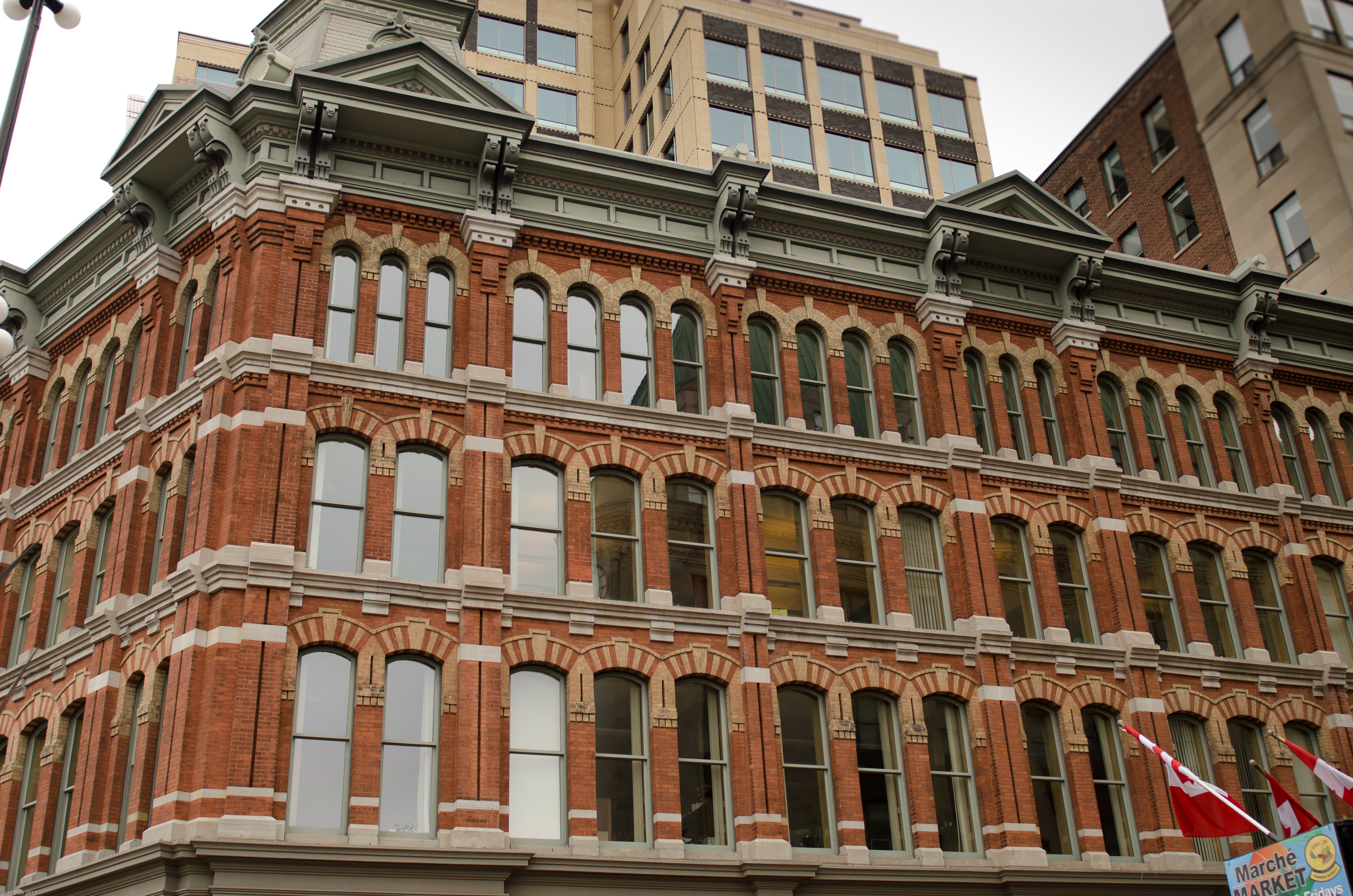
Sparks Street
