= Plaza Bridge =

Bridge in Ottawa, Canada

Coordinates: 45.424932°N 75.695457°W

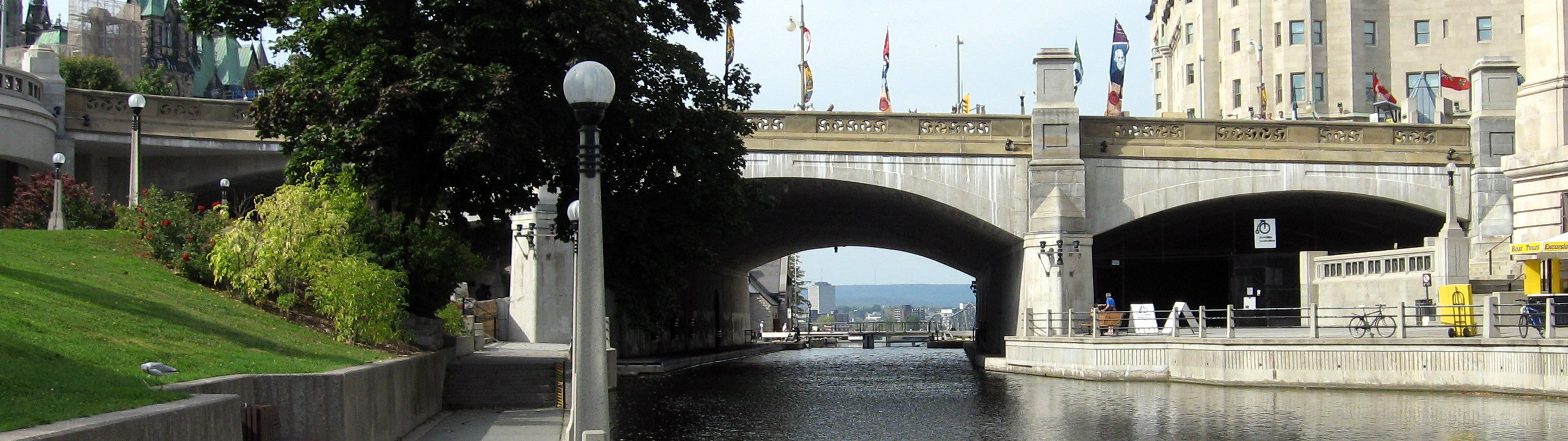

The Plaza Bridge in Ottawa, Ontario, Canada, is an automotive and pedestrian bridge that crosses the Rideau Canal just south of the Ottawa locks. It joins Wellington Street and Elgin Street in the Downtown core to the west with Rideau Street to the east. The Chateau Laurier abuts the bridge at the east end, while Parliament Hill is just beyond the west end. It is the northernmost bridge over the canal, just north of the Mackenzie King Bridge.

The bridge is constructed of three masonry spans. The western span is over a roadway along the western bank of the Canal. The central span is over the Canal. The eastern span is over a former railway tunnel running along the east bank of the Canal.

== History ==
=== Sappers' Bridge ===
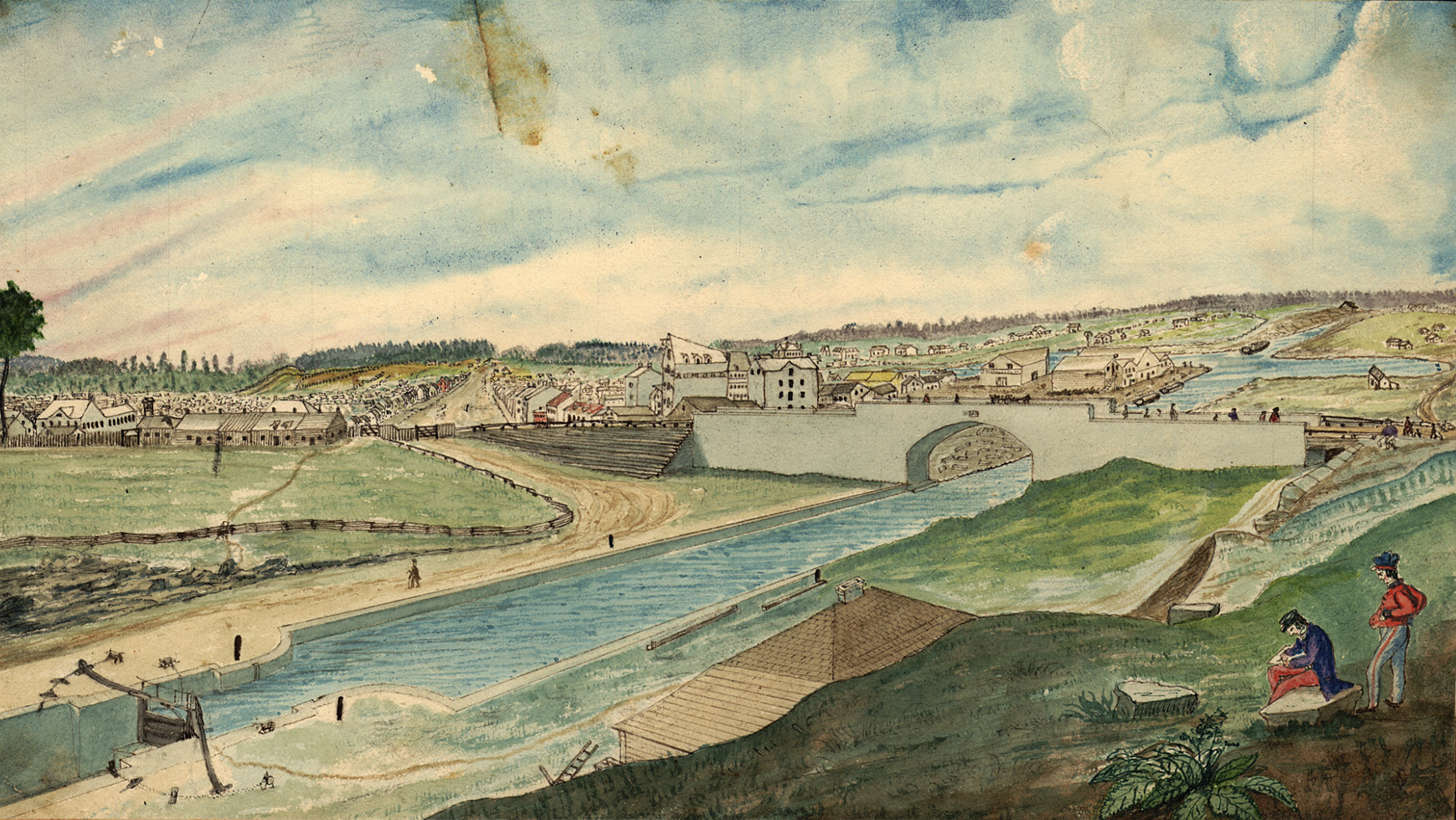
1845 painting of the Rideau Canal, “Sappers’ Bridge, and Lower Town by Thomas Burrowes

Sappers Bridge was one of Ottawa's first bridges (Bytown at the time), built in 1827 over the Rideau Canal connecting Rideau Street in Lower Town with Upper Town. The bridge got its name from the builders, the Royal Sappers and Miners. It was demolished in mid 1912. The current Plaza Bridge connecting Rideau Street with Wellington Street near the Rideau Centre stands roughly in its location.

==== Construction ====
On September 26, Dalhousie presented Colonel By, the overseer of the construction of the Rideau Canal, with a letter authorizing him to divide the land into lots, and sod was turned. Construction of the canal's entrance took place in 1827, dividing Upper Town from Lower town.

Colonel By laid the cornerstone. Construction proceeded in September 1827 and was finished in December. The stone arch bridge was constructed by 15th Company of the Royal Sappers and Miners. The eastern end connected directly to Rideau Street, and its western side joined with a wagon trail leading to Wellington and Bank Streets. The land east of Bank Street had been acquired from Nicholas Sparks by the military, who returned it to him in late 1849, where he commenced its development. Thereafter, Sappers' Bridge became connected directly to Sparks Street.

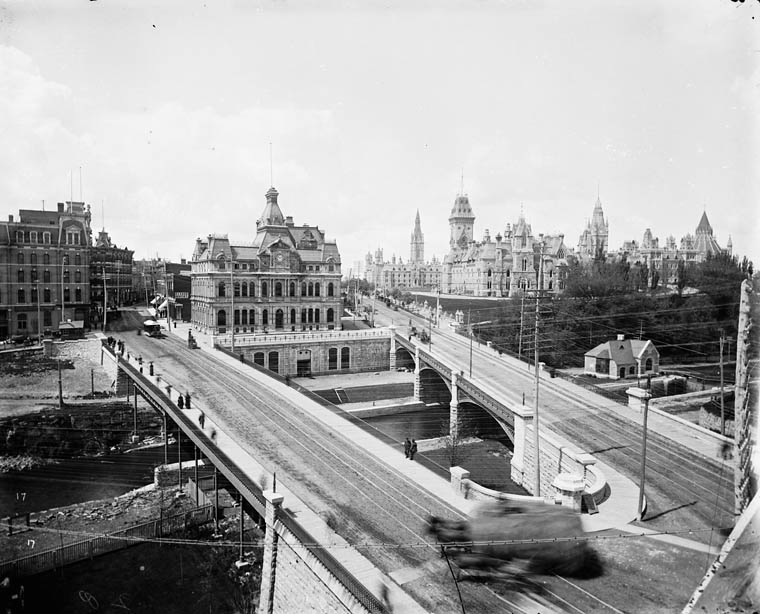
Sappers Bridge and Dufferin Bridge c1890-1895 by Topley, William James

The bridge was modified in the early 1870s with the construction of the Dufferin Bridge. Around the turn of the century, a hole was blasted in Sappers' Bridge to allow for rail traffic to pass. A railway station (predating Union Station) was built east of the Rideau Canal, immediately south of the bridge. With the completion of the Alexandra Bridge rail traffic passed from the station onto Hull.

==== Demolition ====
Between 1910 and 1912, the area saw extensive construction, principally the construction of the Union Station and the Chateau Laurier, as well as the need to move railway traffic along the canal's eastern side, under the bridge bypassing the west side of the Chateau Laurier and continuing on towards the Royal Alexandra Interprovincial Bridge. The bridge itself was part of this new centralized railway station.

By late July 1912, the Sappers' Bridge was demolished to allow for the development of Connaught Place (now Confederation Square) In 1915, two of its stones were placed on the site of Colonel By's home in Major's Hill Park.

=== Dufferin Bridge ===
The Dufferin Bridge was built in the early 1870s, forming a triangle with the existing Sappers Bridge. In 1912, both the Sappers Bridge and the Dufferin Bridge were demolished in favour of Connaught Place, today part of Confederation Square.

=== Plaza Bridge ===
The Plaza Bridge replaced two bridges across the Canal, the Sappers Bridge and the Dufferin Bridge. Construction on the new Plaza Bridge was finished by December 1912.

Several buildings, including the Russell Hotel and Ottawa's first City Hall, existed in the place of today's National War Memorial. In the 1930s, the memorial was erected and Elgin Street was rerouted around the Cenotaph, southbound traffic along the west side of the square and the northbound section along the path of the southern bridge. The bridge was also widened at that time.

In the 1990s, the bridge structure was renovated, adding an extra access to the canal via a staircase in the area between the original two bridges.

The Sapper's Bridge memorial was erected by the Canadian Military Engineer Centennial 1903-2003 Committee and the National Capital Commission. The plaques, which were unveiled on April 29, 2004, are dedicated in honour of a century of contributing service by Canadian Military engineers.

== See also ==
- List of bridges in Ottawa
- Military engineering
