= Frontenac County Court House =

Coordinates: 44°13′40″N 76°29′23″W

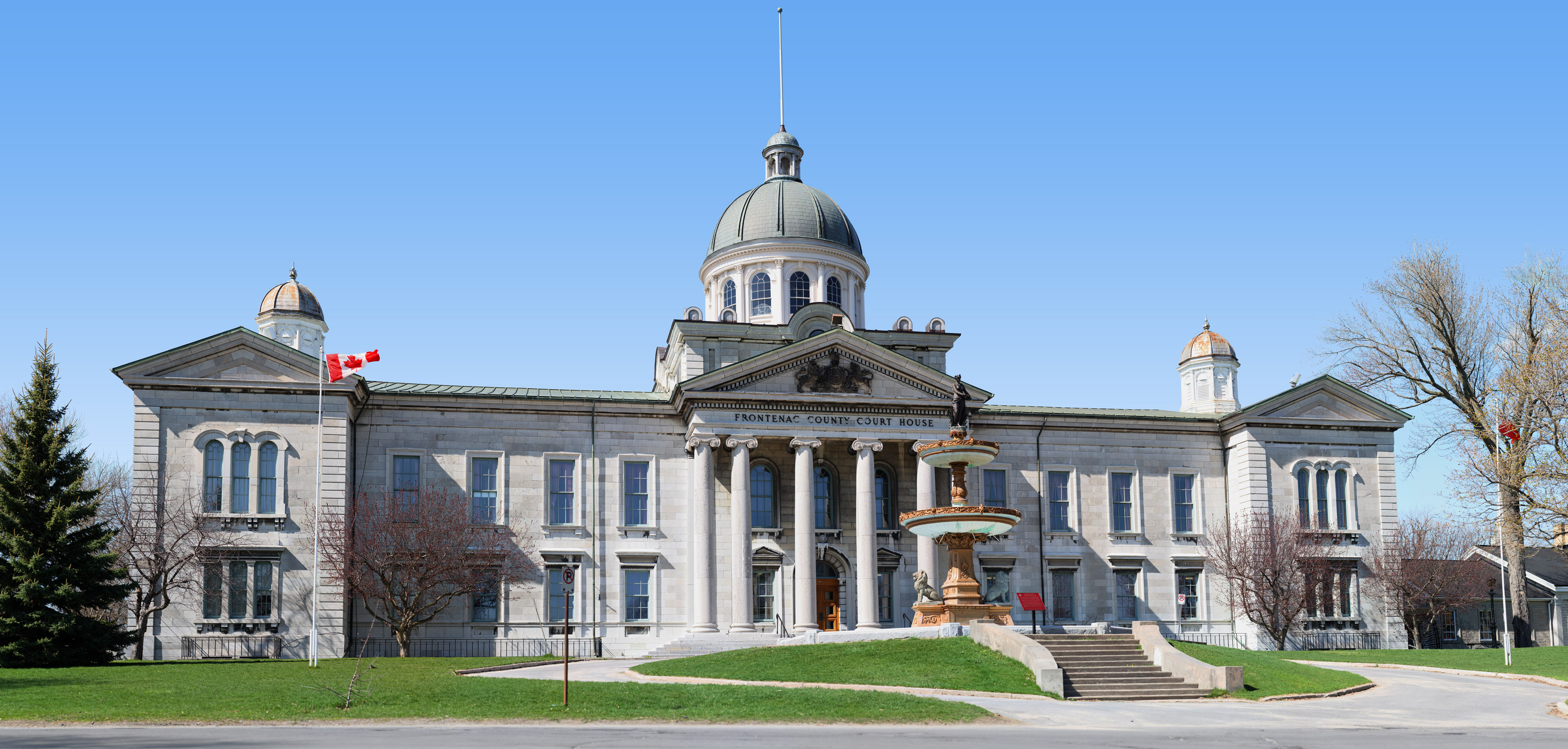
- Frontenac County Court House
- Interactive map of Frontenac County Court House
- Location: Kingston, Ontario, Canada
- Established: 1858
- Built: 1855-1858
- Architect: Edward Horsey
- Governing body: Parks Canada
- Website: www.heritagefdn.on.ca

National Historic Site of Canada

The Frontenac County Court House in Kingston, Ontario, Canada is the Courthouse for Frontenac County, Ontario. The Neoclassical building was designed by Edward Horsey and constructed by builders Scobell and Tossell. Alternation after 1874 fire by John Power added the dome tower. It overlooks City Park to its south, and Lake Ontario beyond. The front of the structure features the Royal coat of arms of the United Kingdom.

The building is made from limestone.

The building is located north of Court Street, between Barrie Street and West Street, directly north-east from Queen's Campus. To its north is located Sydenham Public School, and to its south (south of Court Street) is a park with sports fields directly east of Queen's.

== History ==
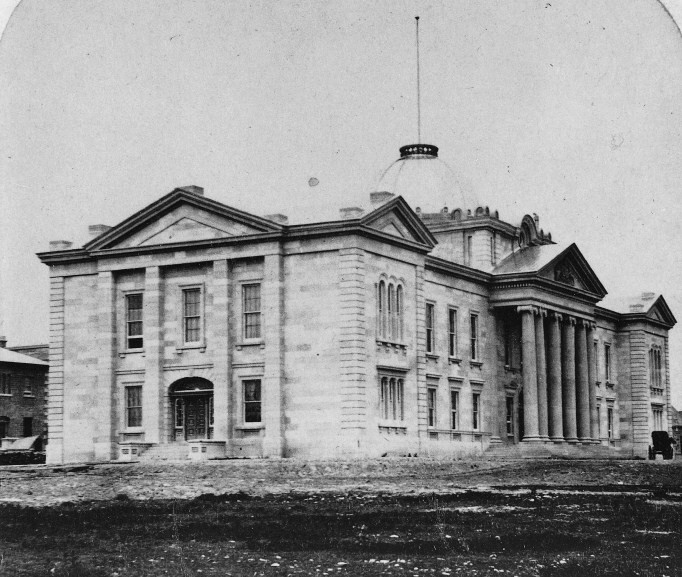
Frontenac County Court House in 1860

The courthouse opened in 1858. Its domed roof tower was added in 1874 after a fire and a three-tiered fountain was added in 1903.

In 1980 it was designated a National Historic Site of Canada.

In October 2011, the Shafia family murders trial began to be heard at this courthouse. The largest courtroom in the courthouse was rewired to add flat-screen televisions and two soundproof booths for real-time translation by interpreters via headphones.

== Interior ==
Pre-1963 changes the Court House was home to Court of Queen's Bench and county administrative offices from 1865-1998:

=== 2nd floor ===
- Judge's room
- Council Chambers
- Jury Room
- Court Room
- Barristers room
- Library
- Rest room

=== Main ===
- offices of the county sheriff, county clerk
- judge's office
- judges chambers
- Court room B, C and D
- treasurer's office
- public offices

Since 1963 many rooms have been altered, including loss of one court room on the second floor.

== See also ==
- Kingston City Hall (Ontario)
