= Kingston Mills =

Part of the Rideau Canal National Historic Site in Canada

- Unincorporated community
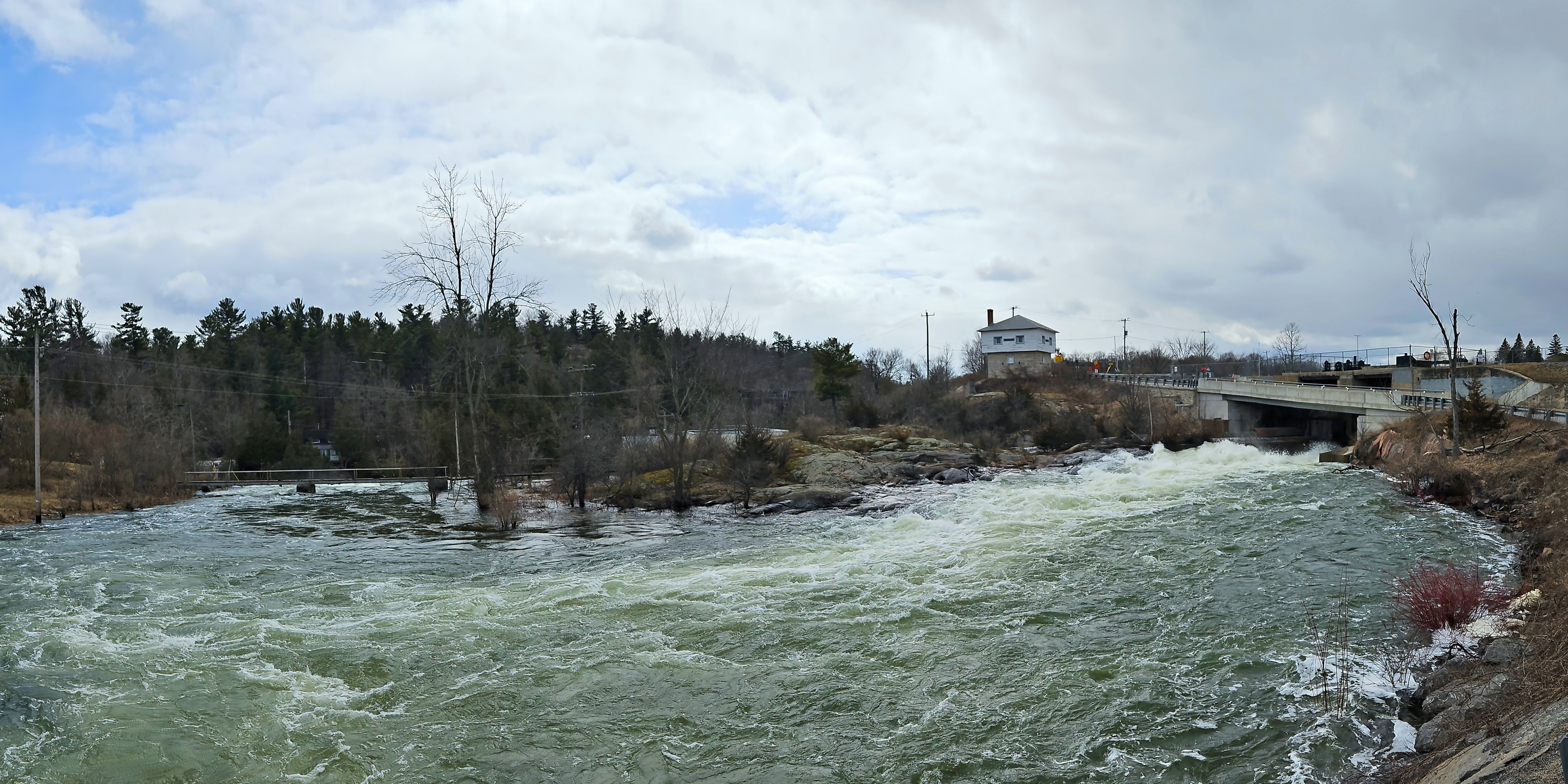
- Cataraqui River at Kingston Mills, with blockhouse in centre-right

- Location within Southern Ontario
- Coordinates: 44°17′32″N 76°26′32″W
- Country: Canada
- Province: Ontario
- County: Frontenac
- Municipality: Kingston
- Founded: 1780s
- Elevation: 75 m (246 ft)
- Time zone: UTC-5 (EST)
  - Summer (DST): UTC-4 (EDT)
- Postal code: K7L 5H6
- Area code: 613

Kingston Mills is a community within the City of Kingston, Ontario, Canada, located approximately 7 kilometres (4.3 mi) north of downtown Kingston at the outlet of Colonel By Lake where the CN mainline railway crosses the Cataraqui River. It has the southernmost of 24 lockstations in the Rideau Canal system, a National Historic Site and World Heritage Site managed and operated by Parks Canada.

== History ==
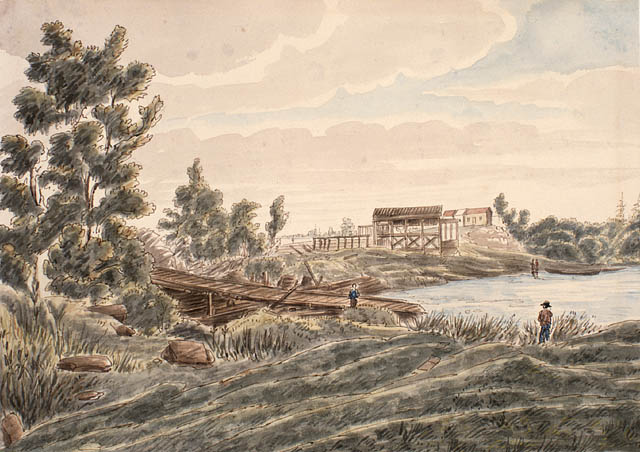
Kingston Mills. Watercolor by James Pattison Cockburn, ca. 1830

Kingston Mills developed because of a series of falls (known as Cataraqui Falls) on the Cataraqui River. In 1784, a grist mill and saw mill were built by the British government on the falls to serve the residents of the growing Loyalist settlement at Cataraqui, now Kingston. Under orders from Major John Ross who was in charge of the Cataraqui settlement, Lieutenant David Brass of Butler's Rangers built a road to the falls from Cataraqui. This was the first road built in Upper Canada. "King's Mill", the area's original name, became a major location for settlers to bring produce for processing. Several mills were built over the years; the structures were often damaged by fire or water, or left abandoned.

After the War of 1812 Kingston's naval base on Point Frederick was deemed vulnerable to American attack. Since Kingston Mills was considered to be better protected from attack because of its inland position, land was acquired and surveyed at Kingston Mills for a naval stores depot with accompanying fortifications. The depot was never built, because British priorities changed from improving Kingston's naval infrastructure to fortifying Kingston and its harbour.

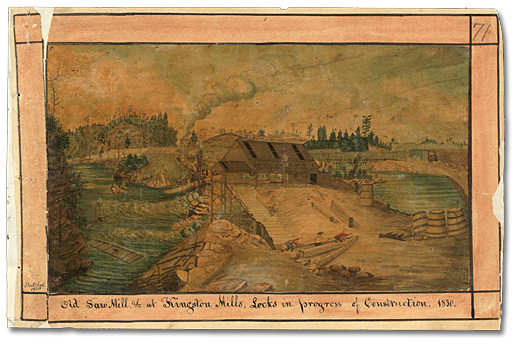
Locks under construction at the Saw Mill at Kingston Mills, 1830. Watercolor by Thomas Burrowes

Beginning in 1827, the site was cleared to begin building locks for the Rideau Canal. The locks would enable boats to bypass the falls. Four locks (Nos. 46, 47, 48, and 49) were constructed, all of which have a lift of 3.6 metres (12 ft). A defensive blockhouse, one of four situated along the Rideau Canal, was constructed at the locks beginning in 1832. It housed militia and British regular troops from 1838 to 1841. The blockhouse has been restored to the condition it may have looked like in the 1830s.

In 1853 a wooden railway bridge was built by the Grand Trunk Railroad over the lower locks. The Canadian National Railway replaced this bridge with a steel bridge in 1929.

Since 1909, several bridges over the canal along Kingston Mills Road have been constructed and replaced. The last bridge, a steel swing bridge, was built in 1988.

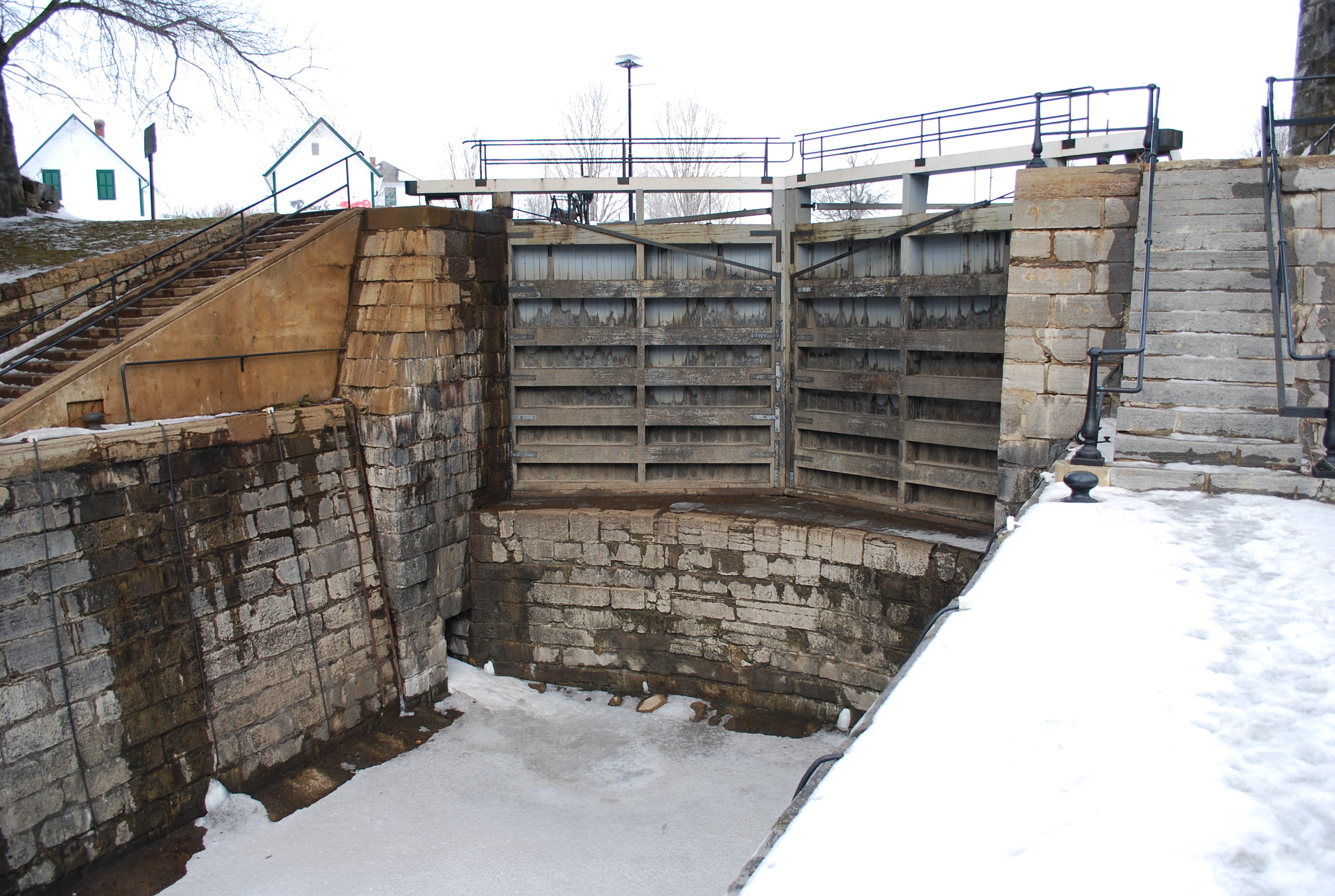
Lock 47 at Kingston Mills. This is one of the three lower locks. The upper lock gate is shown

In 1914 a hydroelectric power generating station was built. The generating station is still in operation.

Other structures built at Kingston Mills include storage barns, stables, railway buildings, living quarters, and the lockstation office, which was once a store house. The only buildings still existing, other than the generating station and the blockhouse, are the lockstation office and the original lockmaster's house which is now a visitor centre known as Lockmaster Anglin's Visitor Centre.

Kingston Mills was designated a National Historic Site in 1925, and a World Heritage Site in 2007.

In 2009, four women of the Shafia Family were found dead in a car underwater at Kingston Mills. It was determined that the four had been murdered. Family members of the deceased were convicted.

== Recreation ==
The Rideau Canal, which goes through Kingston Mills, is a recreational waterway, catering to pleasure craft. Boaters may travel between Kingston and Ottawa. Boat tours along the canal are also provided.

Kingston Mills offers a location for picnicking, fishing, swimming, walking, and rock climbing during the warm months. A rock climbing location has been developed at the southwest end of the locks. Many routes have been set including ones for top roping, lead climbing, trad climbing, and bouldering.
