= Courthouse =

Building which is home to a court

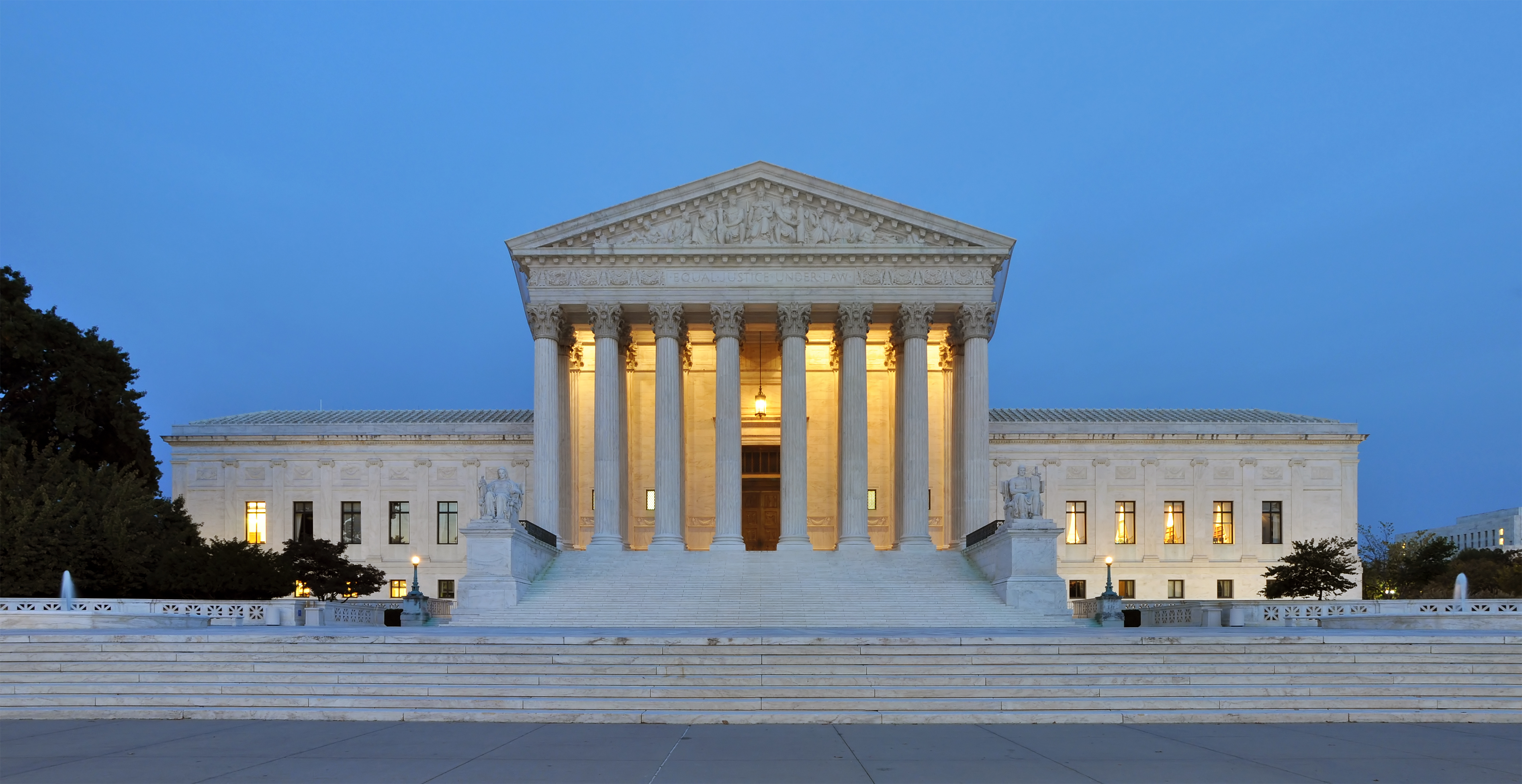
The United States Supreme Court Building in Washington, D.C.

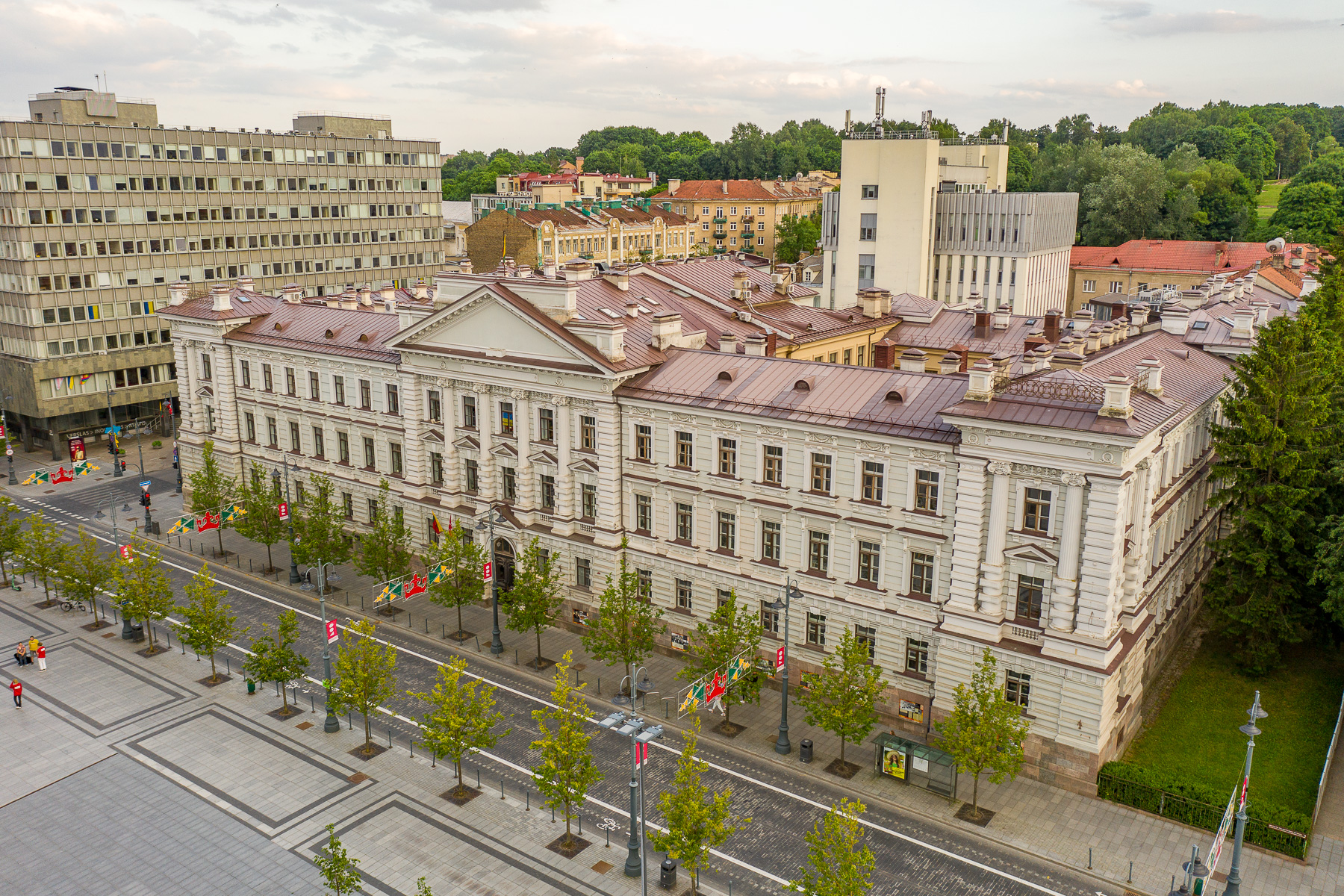
Courthouse of Vilnius regional court and Court of Appeal of Lithuania in Vilnius

A courthouse or court house is a structure which houses judicial functions for a governmental entity such as a state, region, province, county, prefecture, regency, or similar governmental unit. A courthouse is home to one or more courtrooms, the enclosed space in which a judge presides over a court, and one or more chambers, the private offices of judges. Larger courthouses often also have space for offices of judicial support staff such as court clerks and deputy clerks.

The term is commonly used in the English-speaking countries of North America. In most other English-speaking countries, buildings which house courts of law are simply called "courts" or "court buildings". In most of continental Europe and former non-English-speaking European colonies, the equivalent term is a palace of justice (French: palais de justice, Italian: palazzo di giustizia, Portuguese: palácio da justiça).

== United States ==
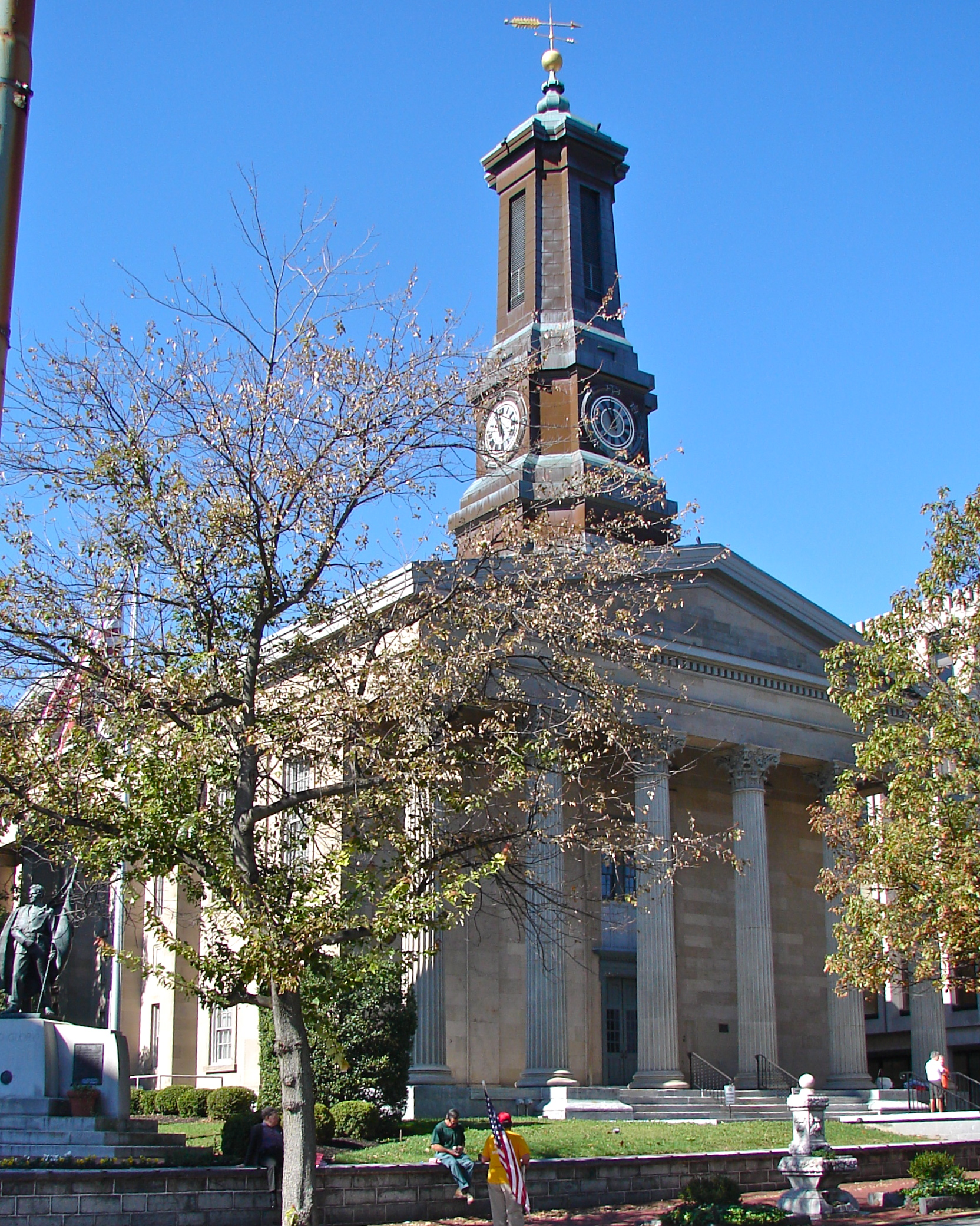
The Chester County Courthouse in West Chester, Pennsylvania houses the Court of Common Pleas

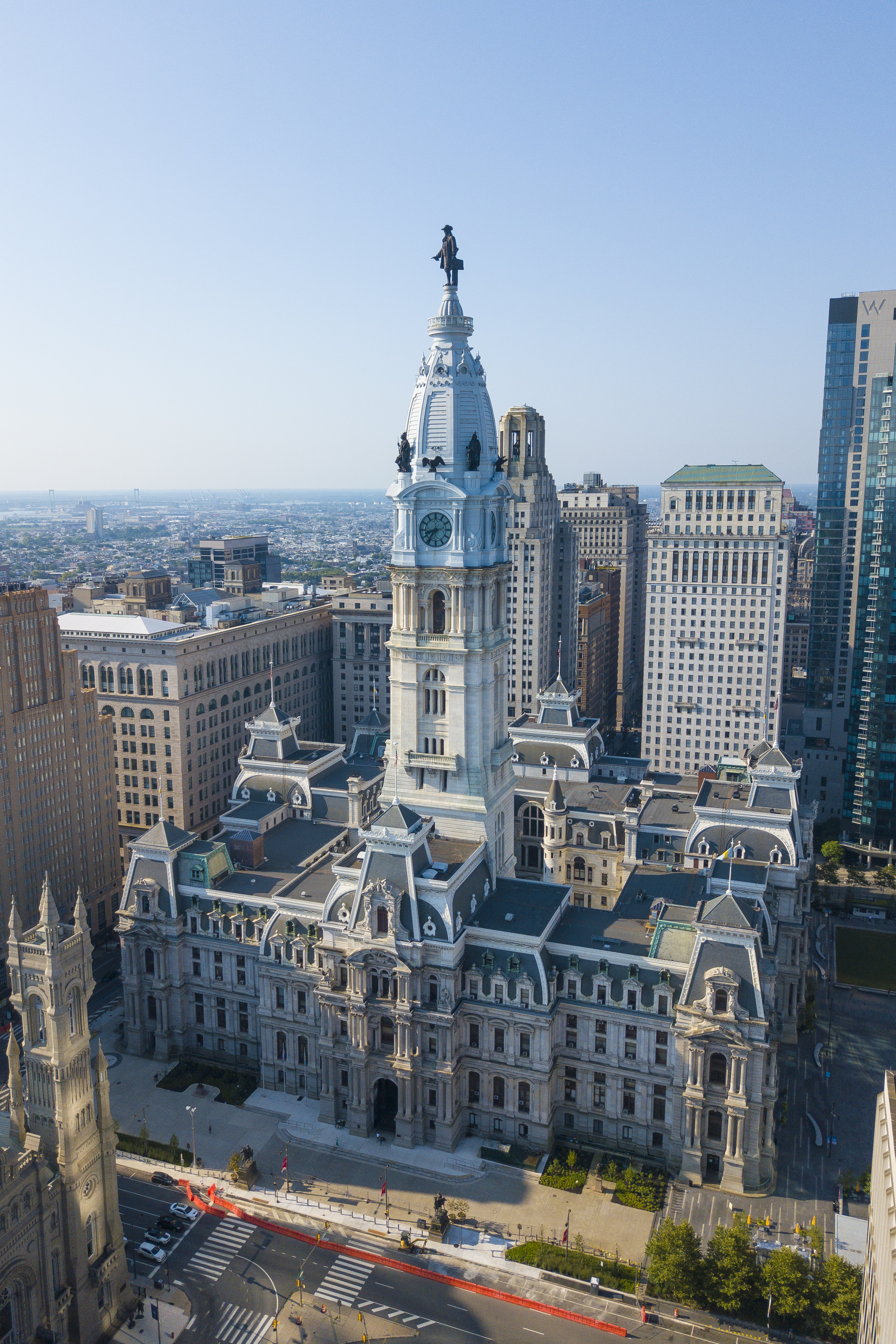
Philadelphia City Hall in Philadelphia, a consolidated courthouse and center of the political branches of Philadelphia's city-county government

In the United States, most counties maintain trial courts in a county-based courthouse, which also house other county government offices. The courthouse may be a part of a wider county government building or complex. The courthouse is usually located in the county seat, although large metropolitan counties may have satellite or annex offices for their courts. A 2014 textbook estimated that there were "roughly 17,000 courthouses" in the United States.

Early American courthouses were very simple, with "plain furnishings and finishes". By the middle of the 19th century, courthouses increasingly evolved into "imposing, grandiose" structures featuring "formal architectural elements such as columns, domes, clock towers, and grand entrances". Courthouses often have entrances which require visitors to climb "an excessive number of steps that lead to a single set of doors through which all people must enter". The point of such architecture is to project "an image of solidity" and "strength". Today, American courthouses come in a broad variety of designs, from ancient "stone fortresses to modern-day, multifloor monolithic towers". In the largest cities, courthouses for criminal courts were sometimes constructed in close proximity to pretrial detention facilities in rundown inner-city neighborhoods, and streets near such courthouses often feature "garish neon signs" for bail bondsmen.

In some cases, the building housing the courthouse may be named in some way or its function may be divided between a judicial building and administrative office building. Philadelphia City Hall, for instance, serves as the seat of the legislative and executive functions of the consolidated city and county of Philadelphia, but most of its floor space is devoted to the Civil Division of the Philadelphia Court of Common Pleas. The Supreme Court of Pennsylvania shares space with three local governments and with the legislative and executive branches of the state government of Pennsylvania in Philadelphia City Hall in Philadelphia, the Pennsylvania State Capitol in Harrisburg, which it shares with the Pennsylvania General Assembly and the Governor of Pennsylvania, and the Pittsburgh City-County Building in Pittsburgh, which it shares with the governments of the City of Pittsburgh and of Allegheny County.

Many judges also officiate at civil marriage ceremonies in their courthouse chambers. In some places, the courthouse also contains the main administrative office for the county government, or when a new courthouse is constructed, the former one will often be used for other local government offices. Either way, a typical courthouse will have one or more courtrooms and a court clerk's office with a filing window where litigants may submit documents for filing with the court.

Each United States district court also has a federally owned building that houses courtrooms, chambers and clerk's offices. Many federal judicial districts are further split into divisions, which may also have their own courthouses. However, sometimes divisional court facilities are located in buildings that also house other agencies or offices of the United States government; for instance, the Mitchell H. Cohen United States Courthouse in Camden, New Jersey houses a United States post office as well as court facilities for the District of New Jersey.

Some branches of U.S. federal government courts are housed in rented office space in buildings housing commercial tenants; for instance, the United States Bankruptcy Court for the District of Delaware is located in an office building in Wilmington, Delaware, across the street from the main courthouse of the district court. The United States District Court for the Eastern District of California has a courthouse in Yosemite to hear misdemeanors and petty crimes for Yosemite National Park. Most of the United States courts of appeals are based in the main courthouses of the federal district court in the city in which they are seated.

The courthouse is part of the iconography of American life and is equivalent to the city hall as the symbol of the municipium in European free cities. Courthouses are often shown in American cinema (i.e. "Peyton Place", "Back to the Future", and "My Cousin Vinny"). They range from small-town rural buildings with a few rooms to huge metropolitan courthouses that occupy large plots of land. The style of American architecture used varies, with common styles including federal, Greek Revival, neoclassicist, and modern.

=== Security ===
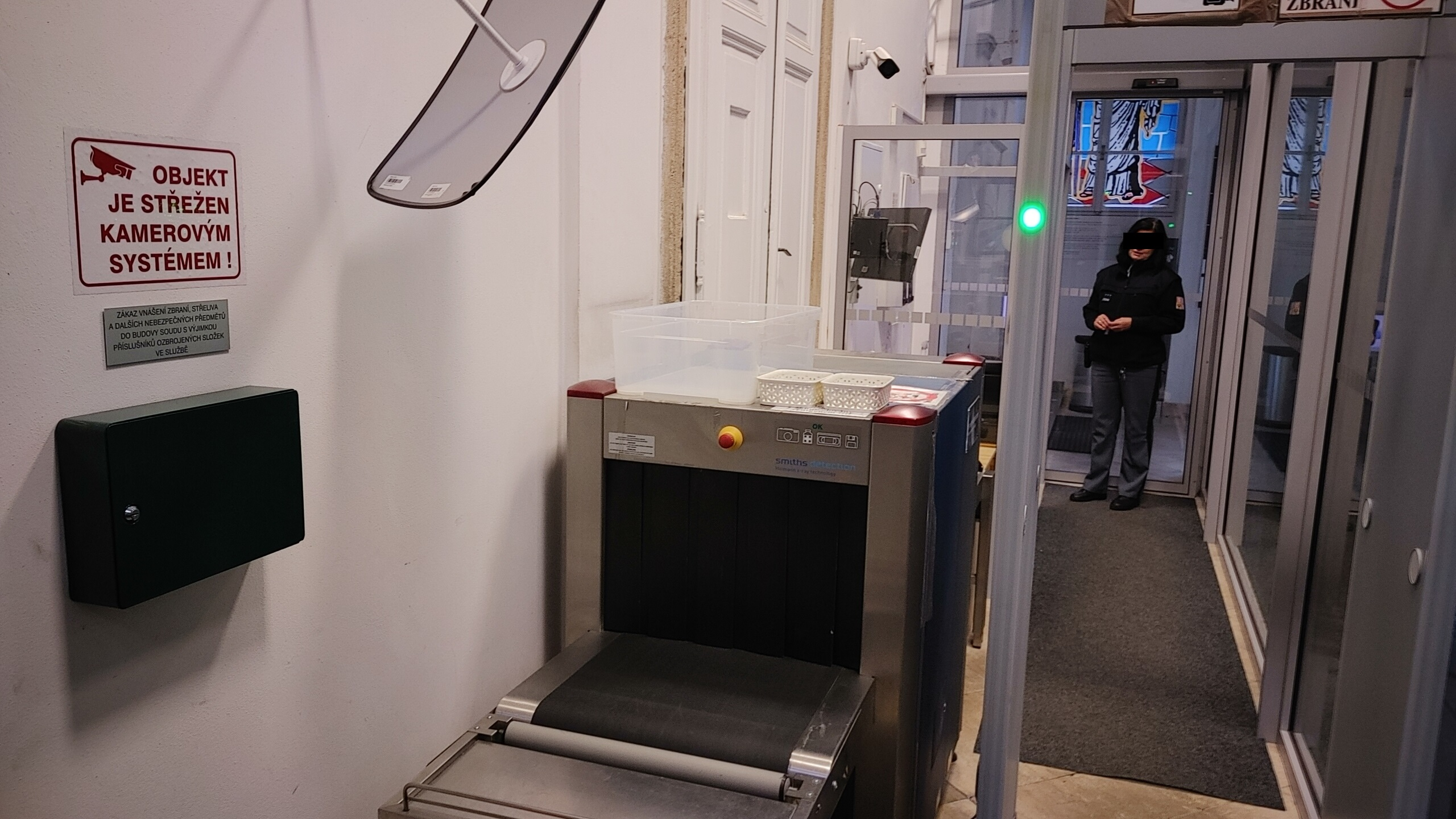
District Court Prague-West entrance. From left: Security box where visitors may deposit a firearm, X-ray machine and metal detector frame, officer of the Judicial Guard in the background.

Court security is a paramount priority in the design, construction, and renovation of modern American courthouses. Every day, courthouses "are visited by a large number of disgruntled and even lawbreaking citizens", such as gang members accused of witness tampering, romantic partners charged with domestic violence, and spouses litigating a divorce. Most importantly, modern courthouses strive to separate in-custody criminal defendants from the general public.

The architecture of court buildings can present significant security challenges. Architects typically use two main tools to mitigate security risks within the adjudicative space depending upon local needs, such as the proliferation of weapons: secure entrance vestibules and separation of circulation pathways and adjacencies within the footprint of the building.

Secure entrance vestibules provide court staff the opportunity to screen visitors to the building for contraband, such as weapons and narcotics, as well as for unauthorized access. Midsize to larger courthouses often have separate entrances to the building for the public, prisoners, judges, and witnesses. These entrances may be monitored remotely from a central security station. In lower risk settings, the security screening may be more perfunctory and serve as an information desk to direct visitors to the various agencies and offices housed within the court building.

Once users of the court have entered the building through security screenings and access control checkpoints, the circulation systems of passageways through the building provide discrete pathways by which the public, court staff, and in-custody defendants access to courtrooms and other court services, such as attorneys, pretrial and probation services, and clerks' offices. The circulation pathways and adjacency diagrams designed for newer and larger courthouses often ensure that the only place the systems of circulation, including hallways, stairwells, and elevators overlap is within the monitored setting of the courtroom. This reduces the risk of unauthorized access to court materials by the public, such as court clerk record vaults, as well as the risk of in-custody defendants intimidating witnesses or jurors while being escorted through the public areas of the courthouse.

For example, the Los Angeles Superior Court added such checkpoints to all entrances to its main courthouse in Downtown Los Angeles after a woman was shot and killed by her ex-husband in open court in September 1995. The Supreme Court of California ruled in 2002 that Los Angeles County (which at the time was responsible for maintaining the courthouses) was not liable to her three children under the California Government Tort Claims Act.

After the Oklahoma City bombing, the federal government proceeded to heavily fortify all large federal buildings, including many urban courthouses.

Some courthouses in areas with high levels of violent crime have redundant layers of security. For example, when the Supreme Court of California hears oral argument in San Francisco or Los Angeles, visitors must pass through one security checkpoint to enter the building, and another to enter the courtroom.

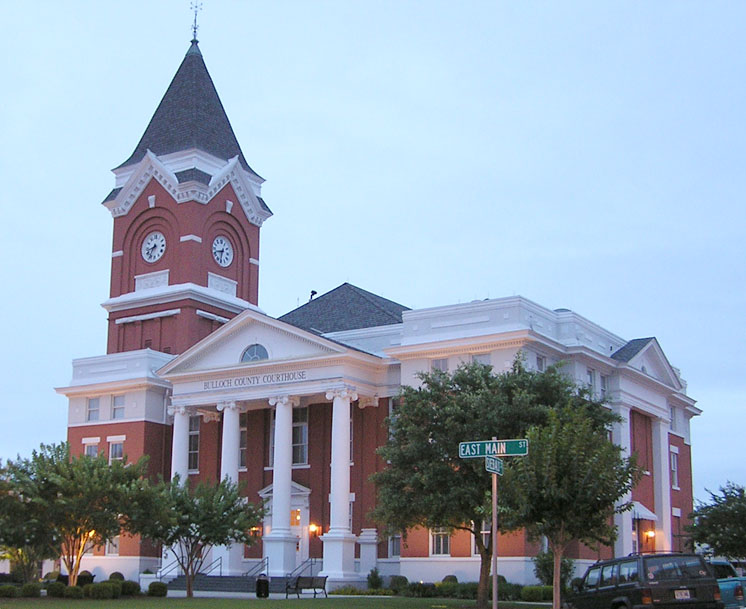
Bulloch County Courthouse in Statesboro, Georgia

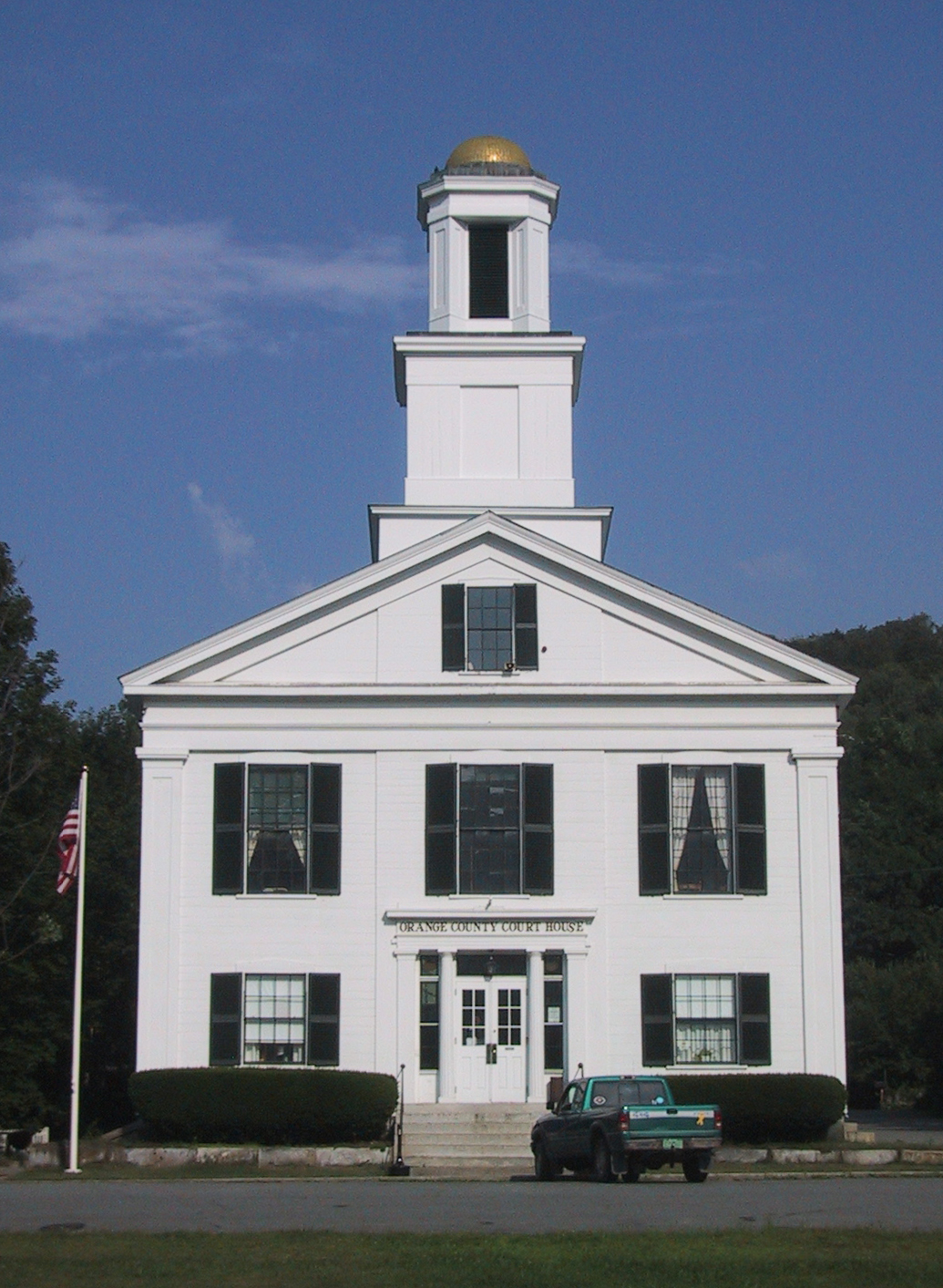
The Orange County, Vermont courthouse

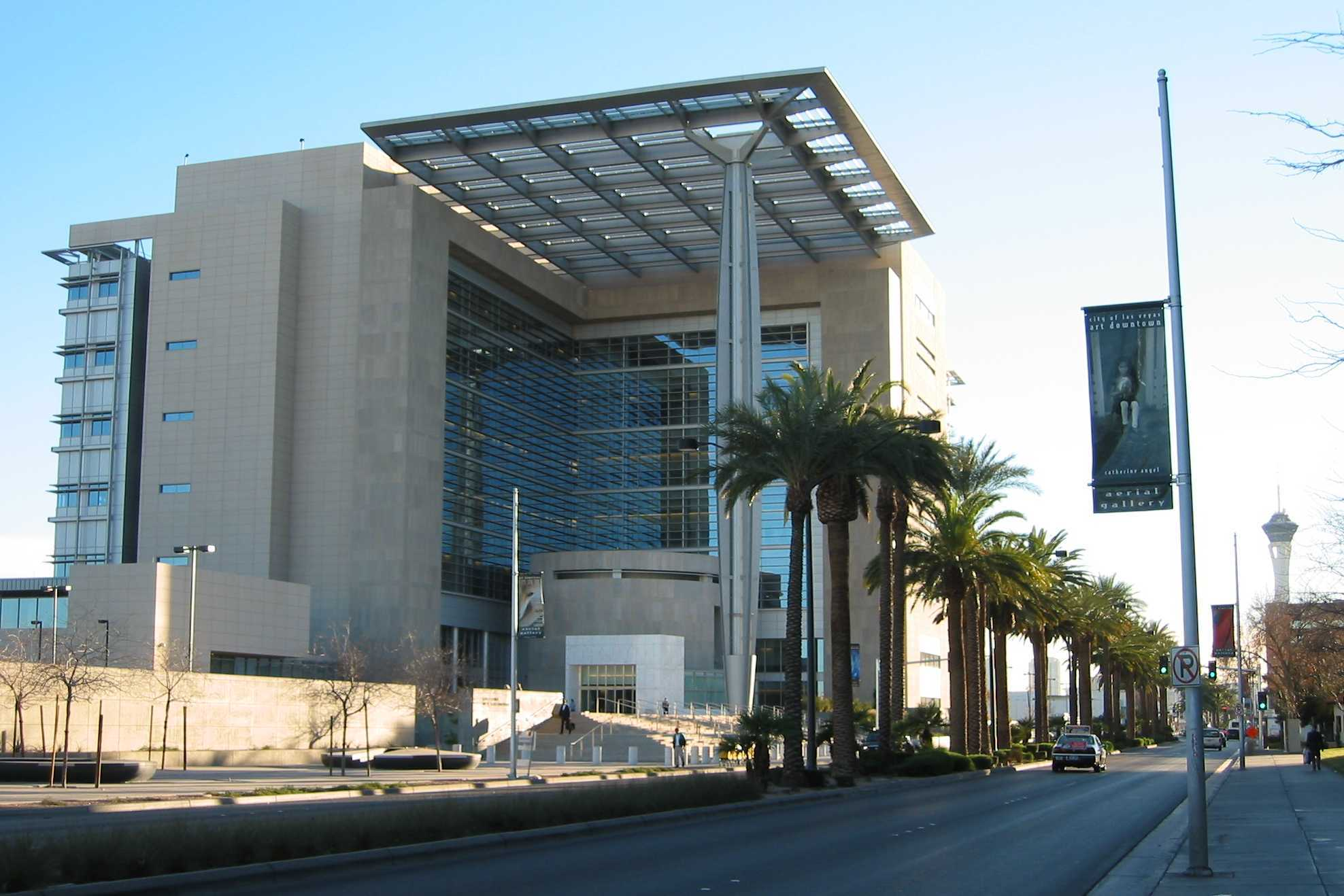
The federal courthouse in Las Vegas

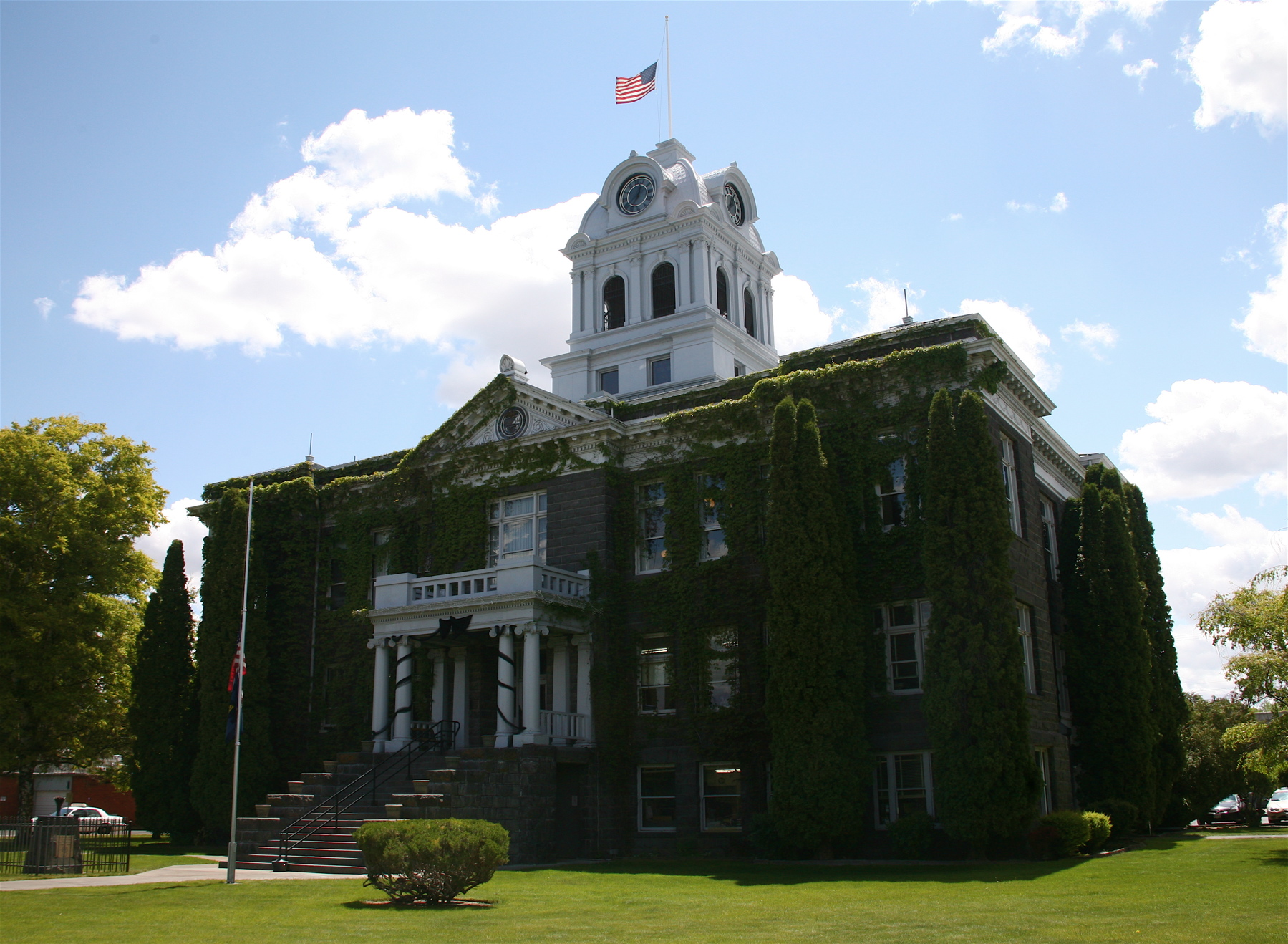
The Crook County Courthouse in Prineville, Oregon

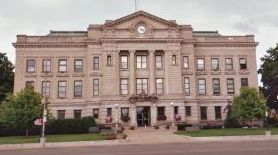
The DeKalb County Court House in Auburn, Indiana

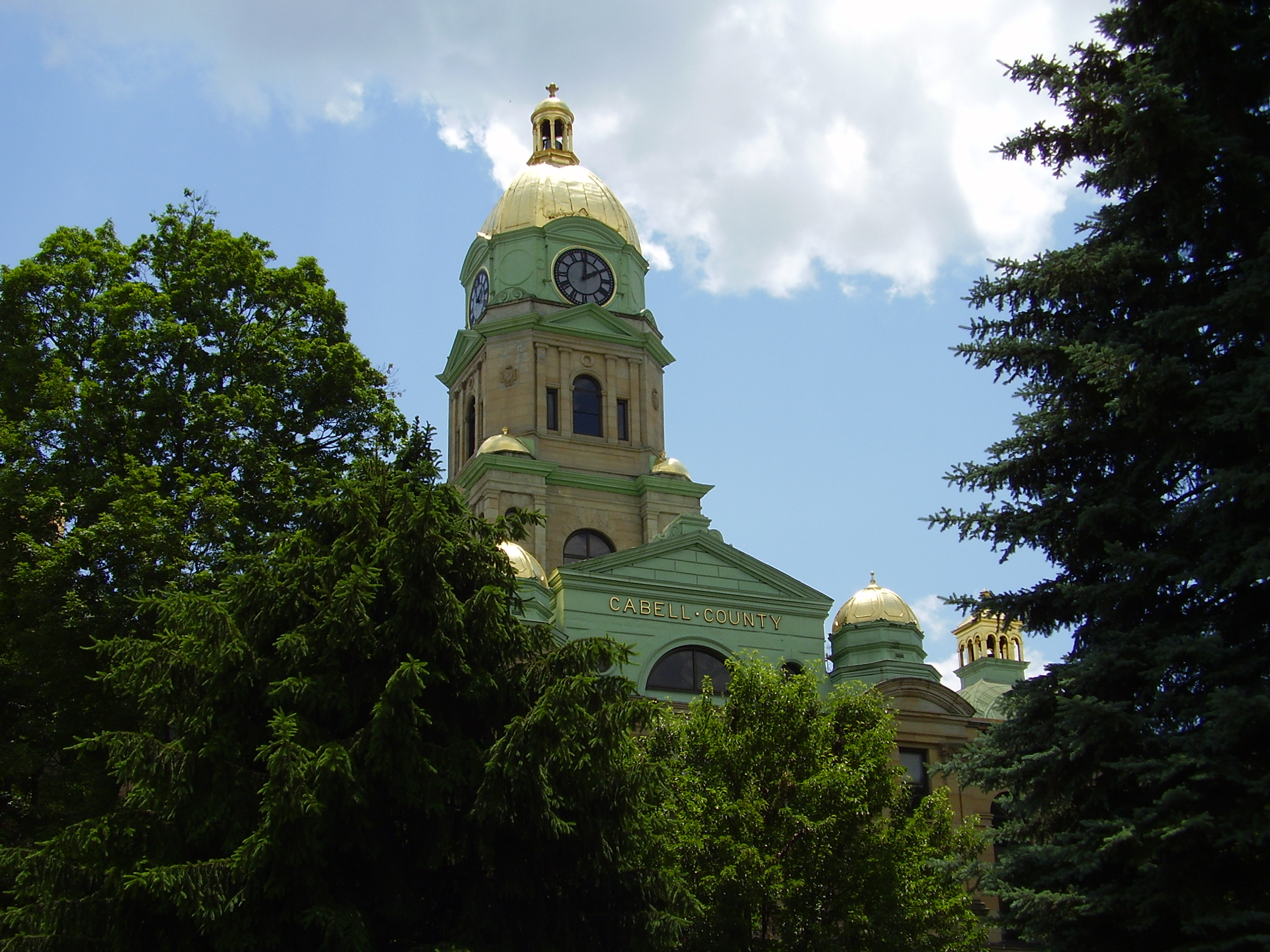
The Cabell County Court House in Huntington, West Virginia

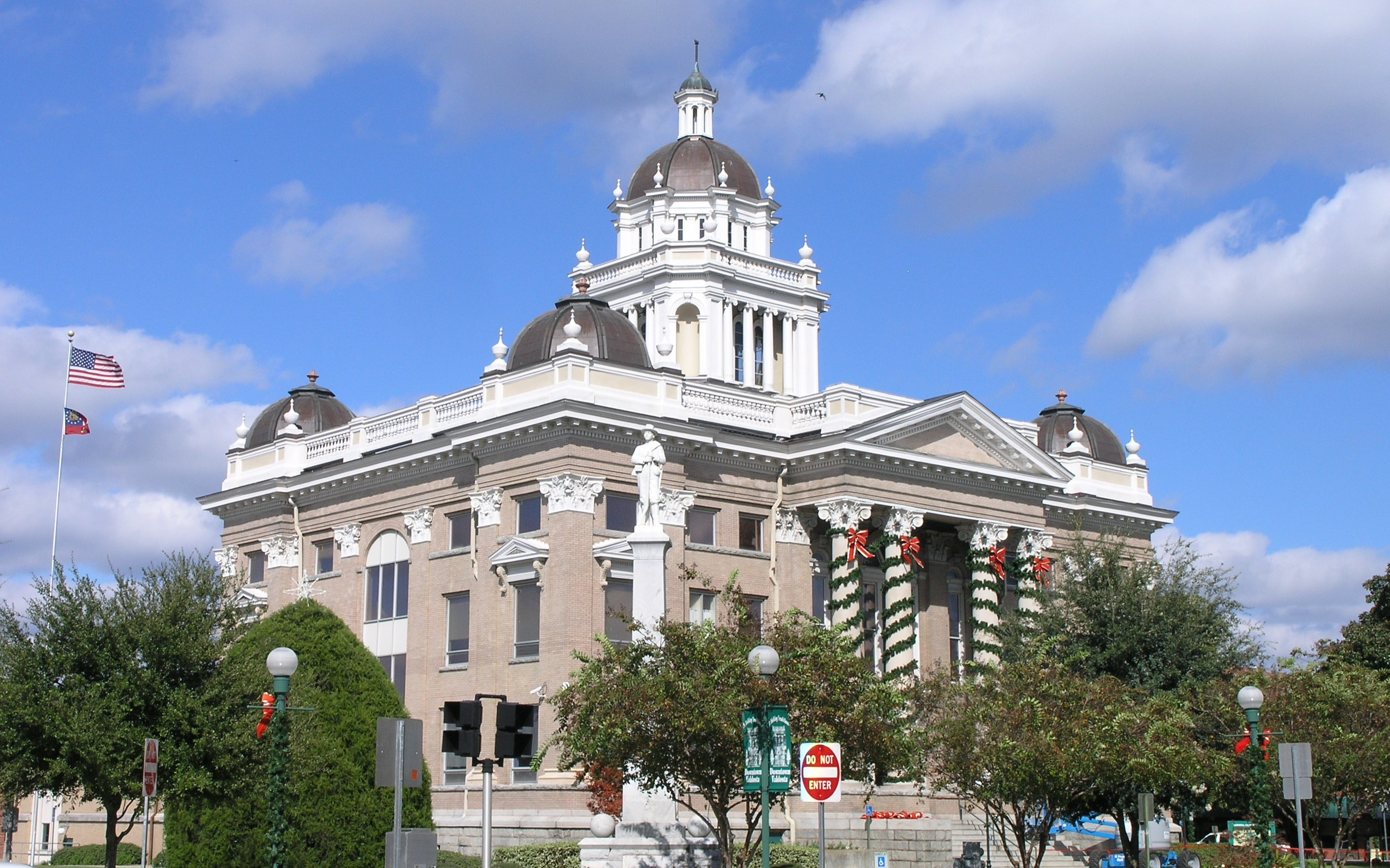
The Lowndes County Courthouse in Valdosta, Georgia

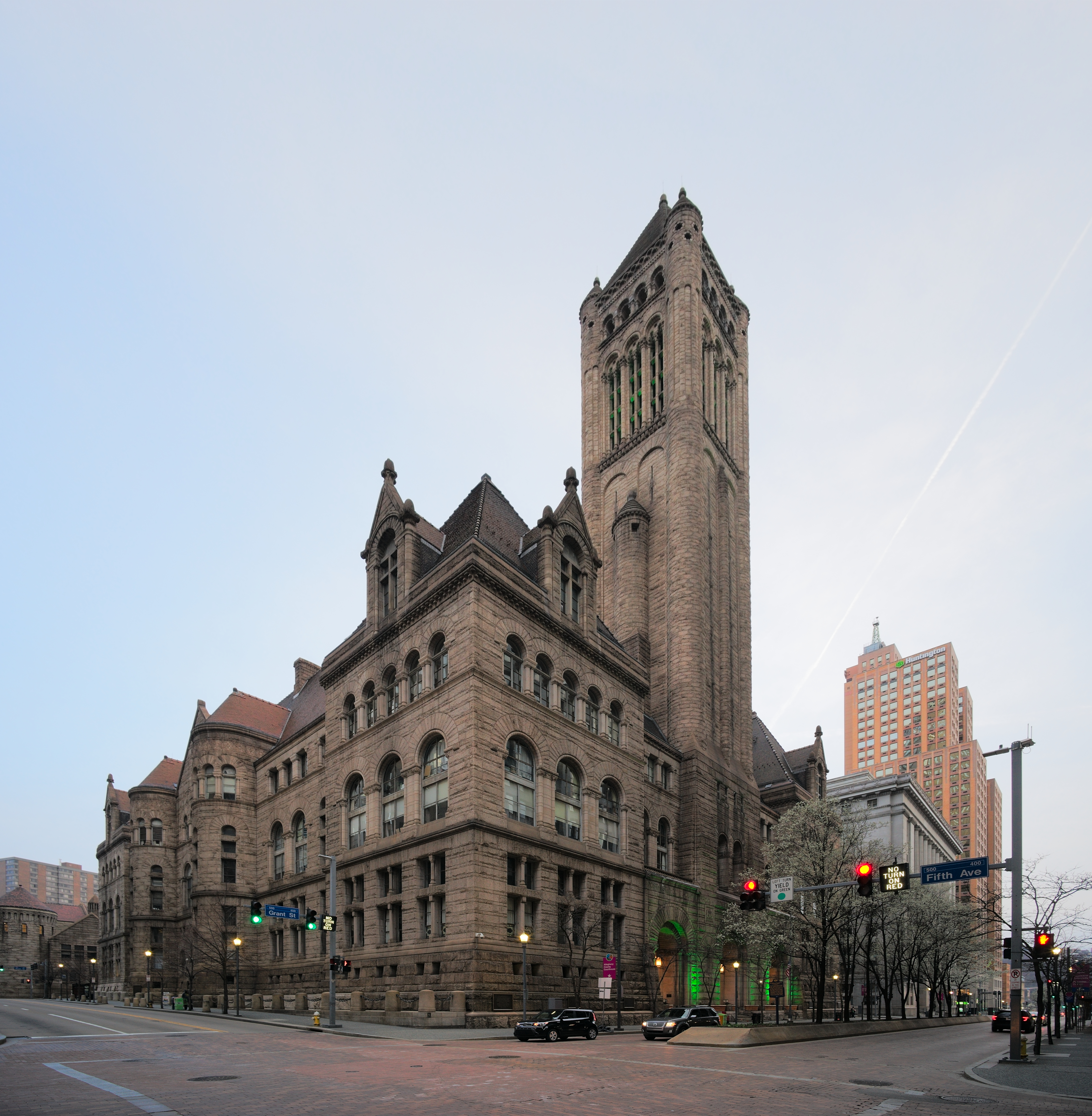
The Allegheny County Courthouse in Pittsburgh

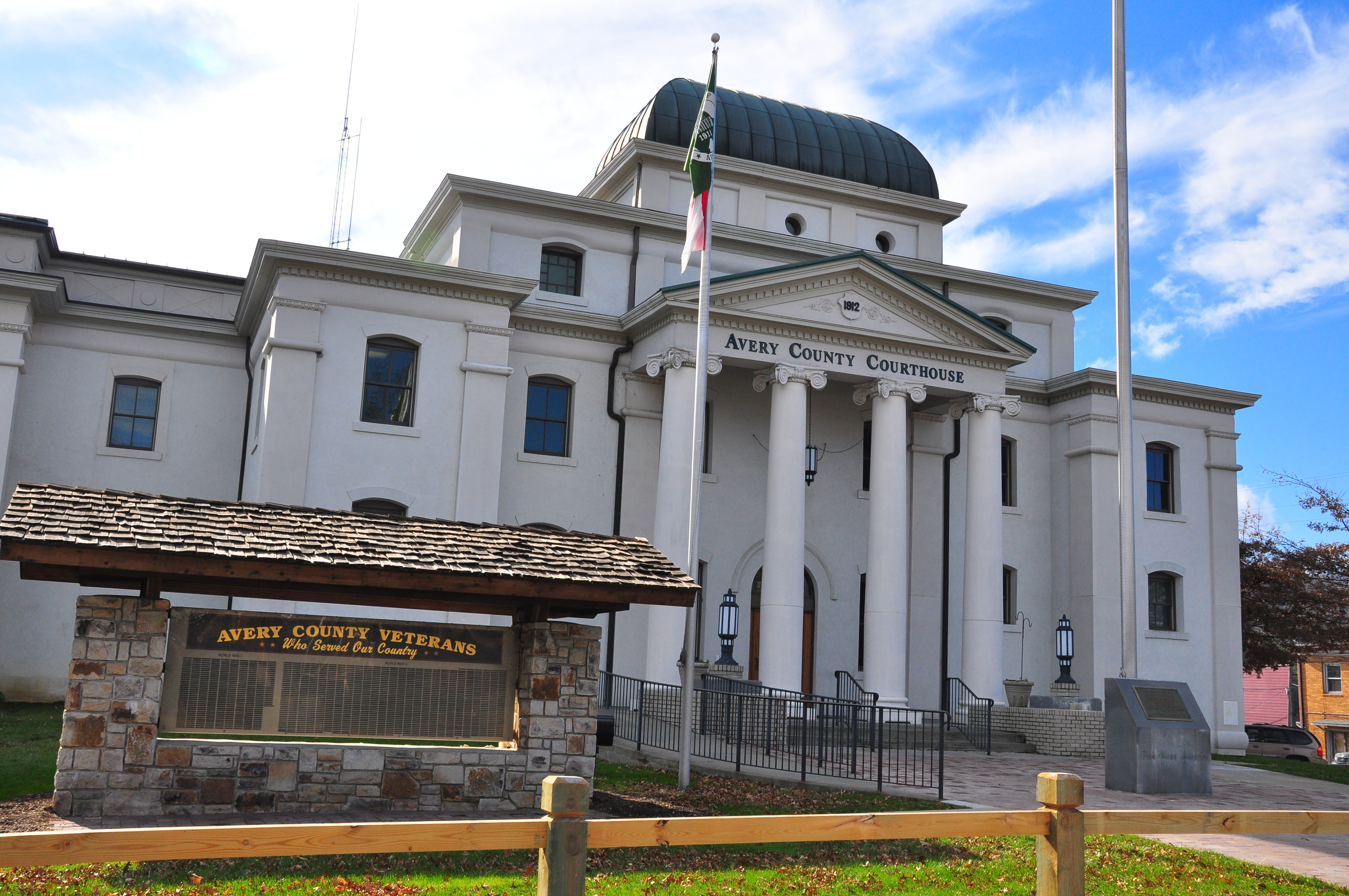
The Avery County Courthouse in Newland, North Carolina

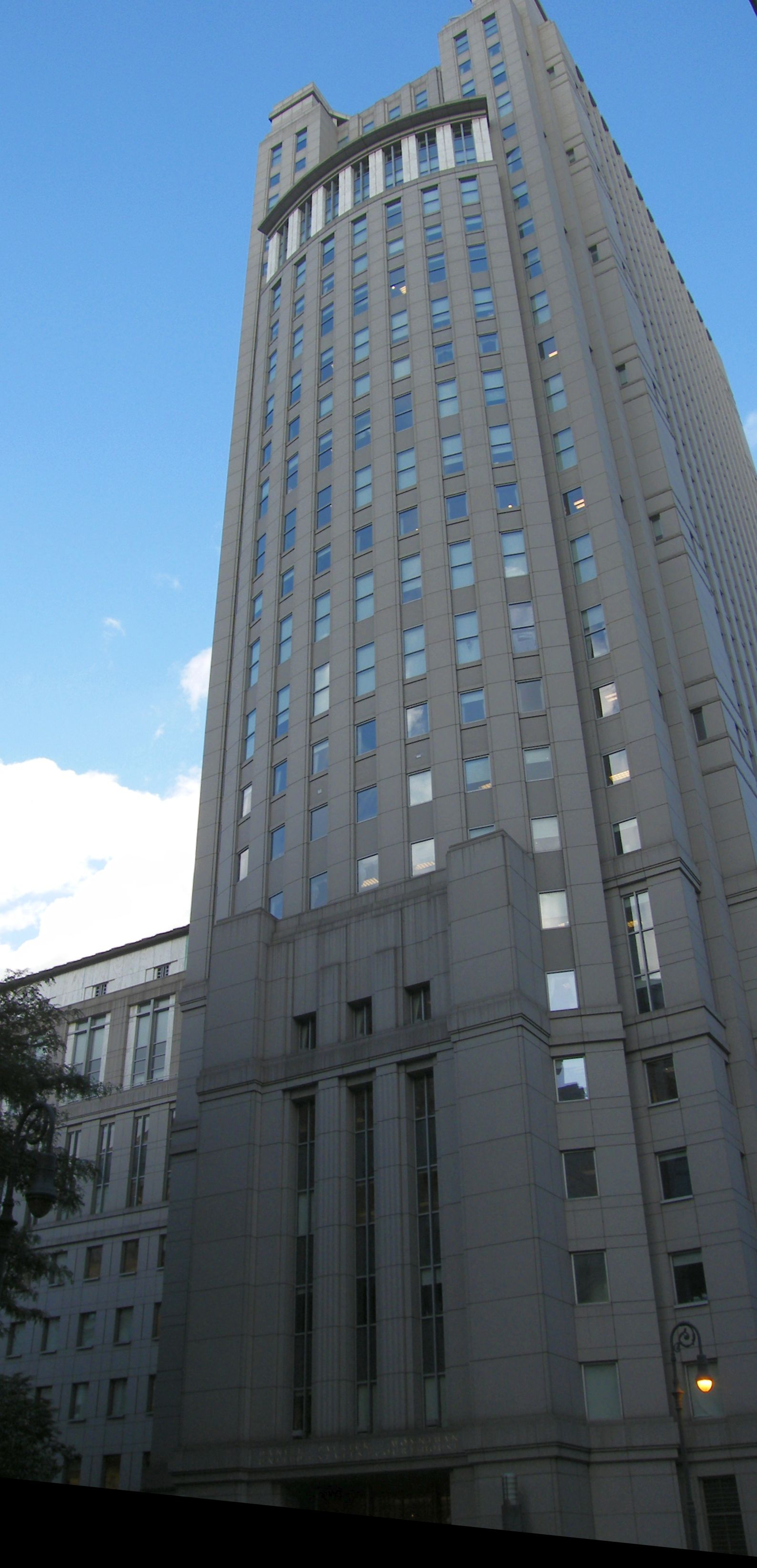
The Daniel Patrick Moynihan United States Courthouse in New York City

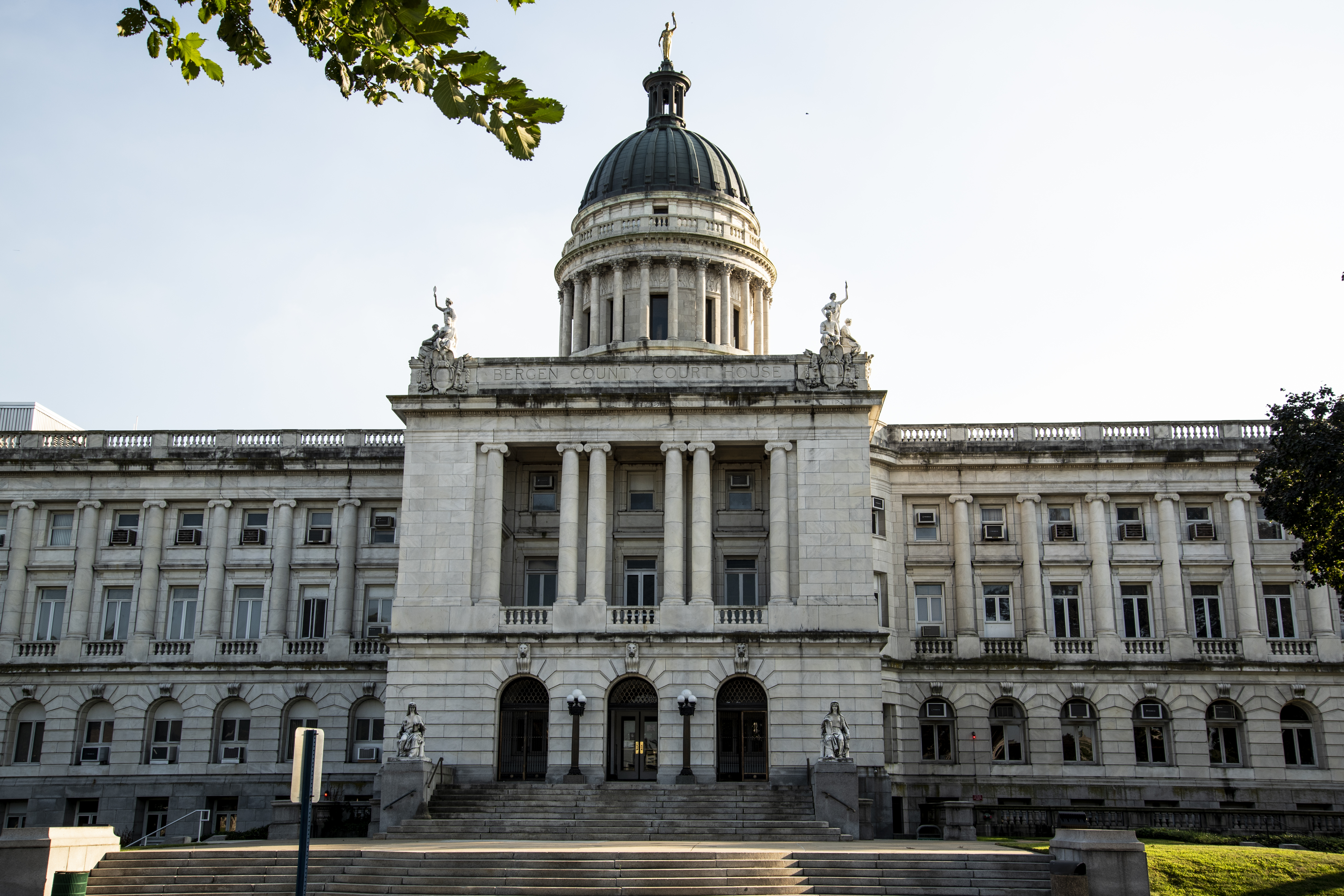
The Bergen County Court House in Hackensack, New Jersey

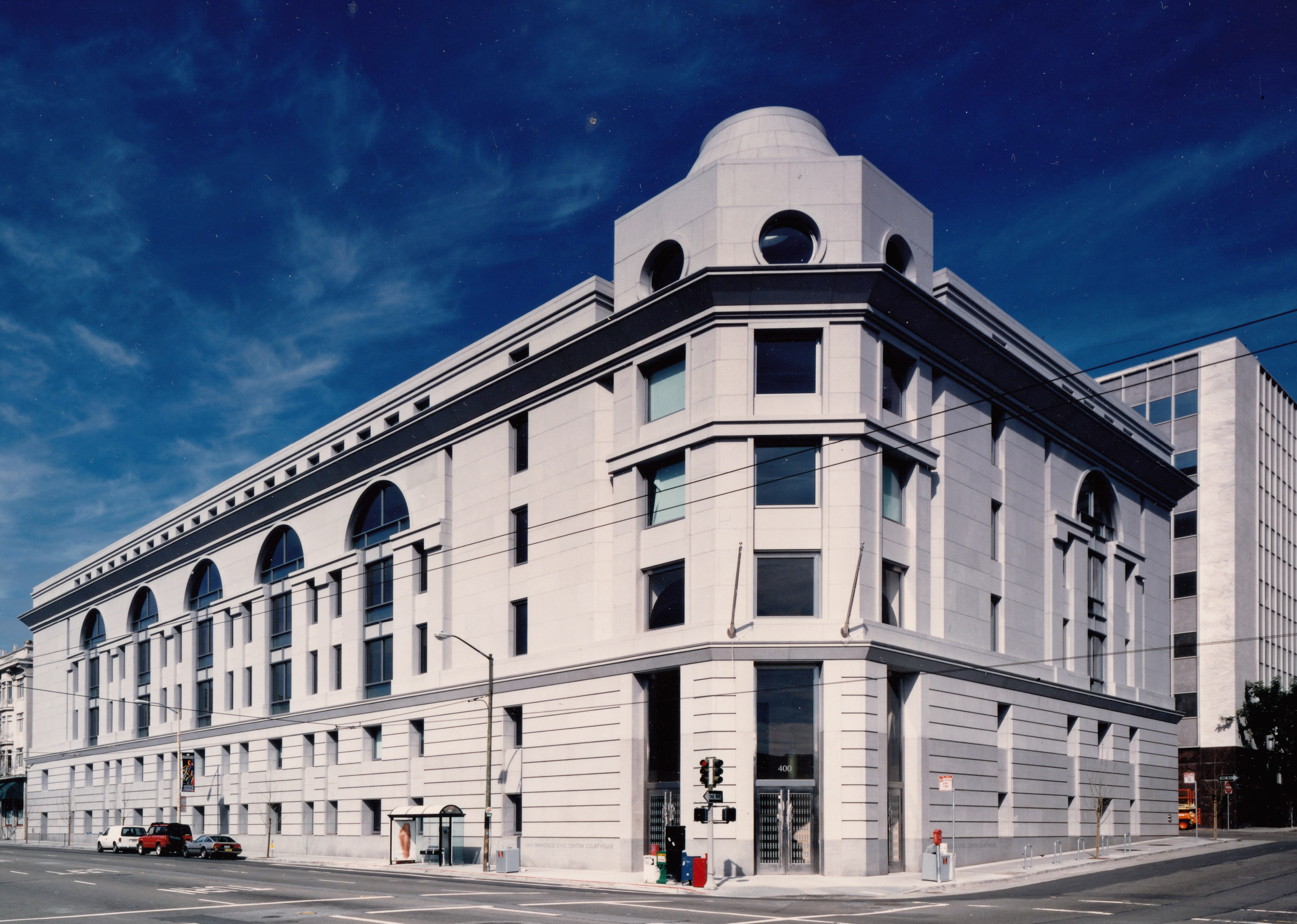
The San Francisco County Superior Courthouse in the San Francisco Civic Center

== Canada ==
In Canada, each municipality constructs its own courthouse, or several in the case of large cities. In smaller communities the court is in the same building as the city hall and other municipal offices. In the past many courthouses also included the local prison.

One well-known court house in Canada is the Romanesque Revival (Neo-Romanesque) Old City Hall in Toronto, Ontario. Designed by E.J. Lennox, Old City Hall was completed in 1899 and has been functioning as a municipal building ever since. It was originally constructed to facilitate Toronto's City Council, legal and municipal offices and the city's courts however following the construction of the fourth city hall (adjacent to the third, on Queen Street) the building's purpose was limited to being solely a courthouse for the Ontario Court of Justice. The building can be described as Romanesque Revival due to multiple characteristics it shares with Romanesque architecture, despite being constructed seven centuries later in a completely different continent. These characteristics include the materiality in terms of large stone construction, the repetitive rhythmic use of windows containing various sized arches and barrel vaults directing attention towards them, decorated spandrels (wall section connecting arches) and the inclusion of gabled walls (pointed sections). Old City Hall has been designated a National Historical Site since 1989.

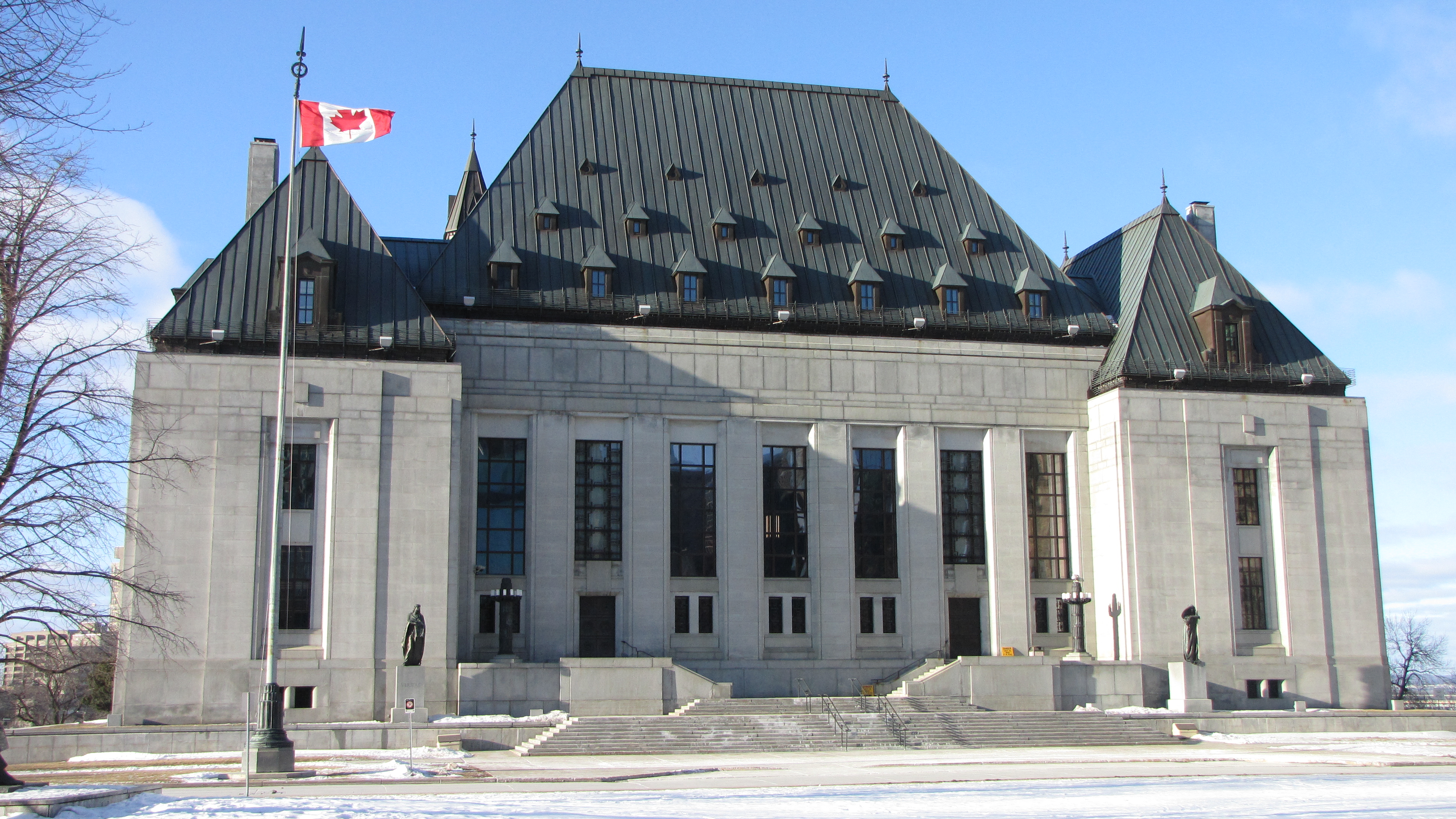
The Supreme Court of Canada in Ottawa

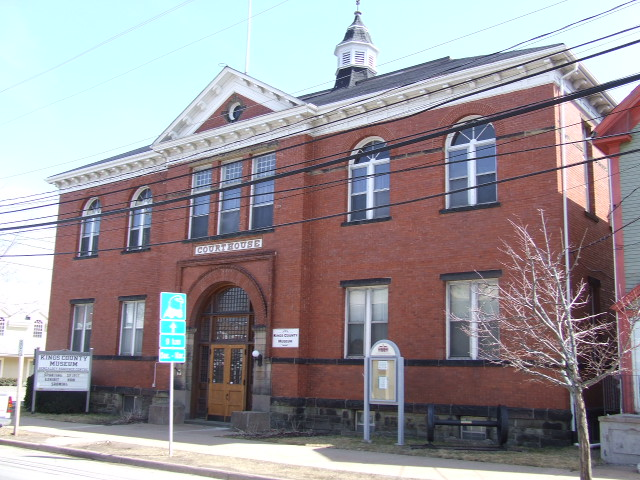
The Kings County Courthouse, Kentville, Nova Scotia

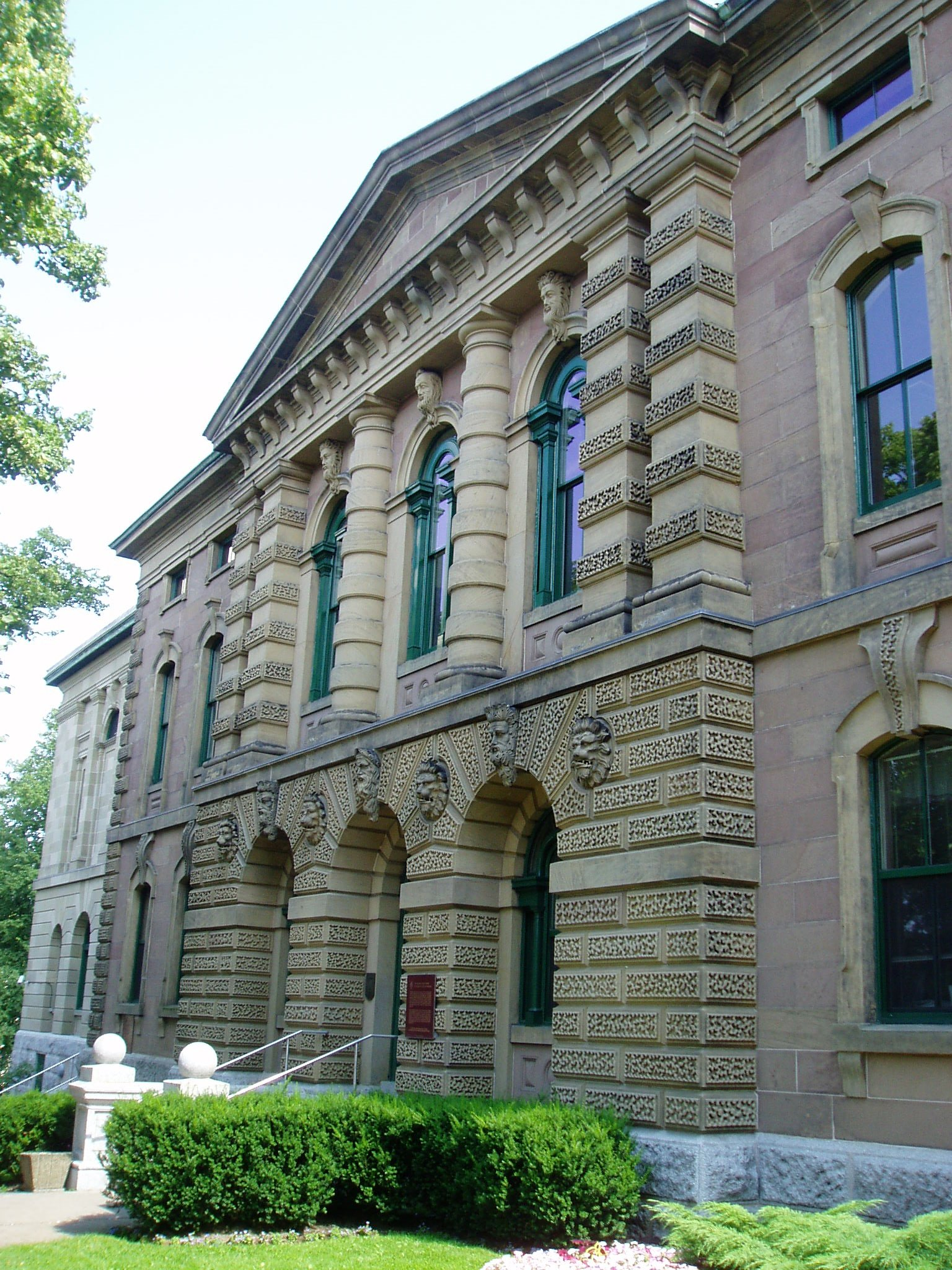
The Halifax Court House in Halifax, Nova Scotia

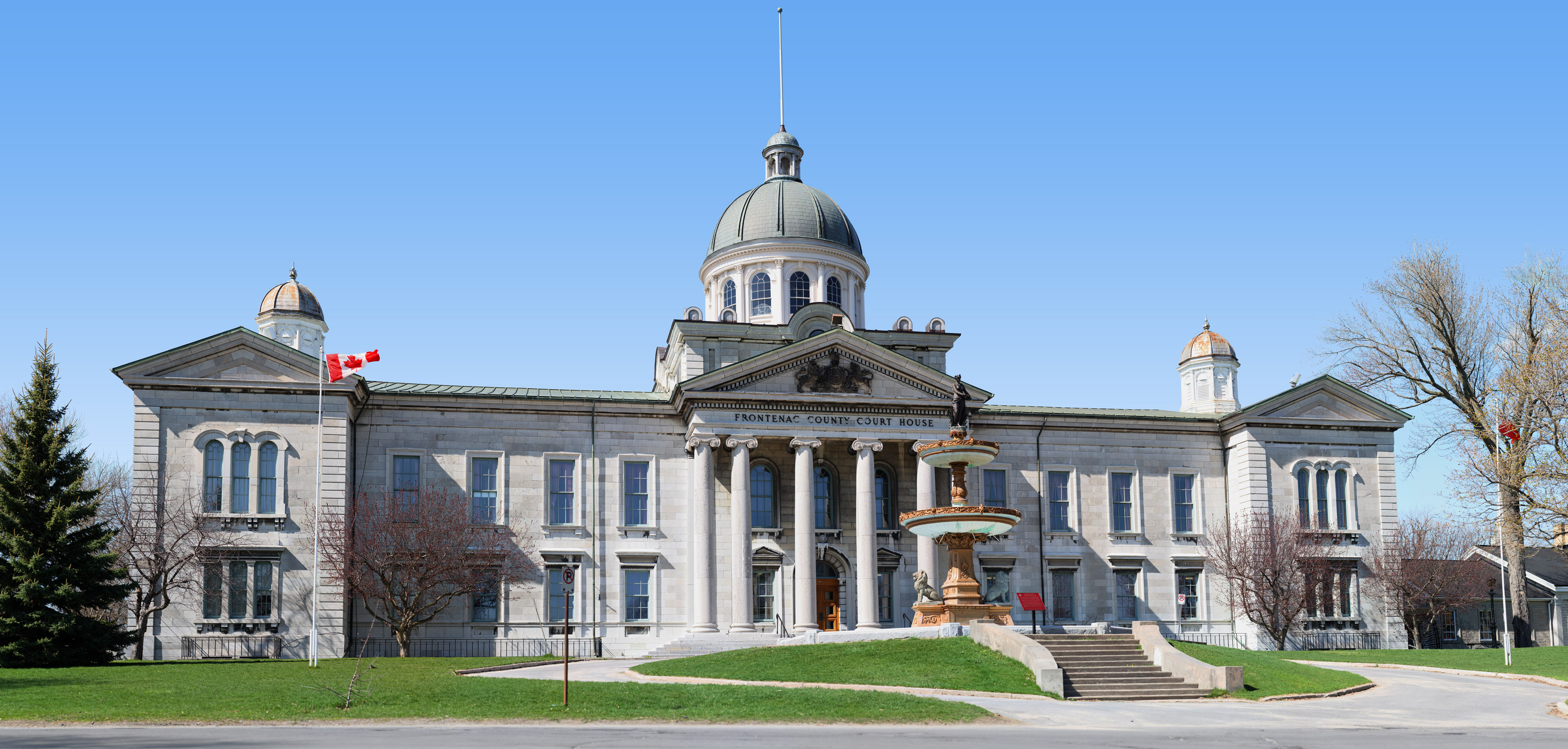
The Frontenac County Court House, Kingston, Ontario

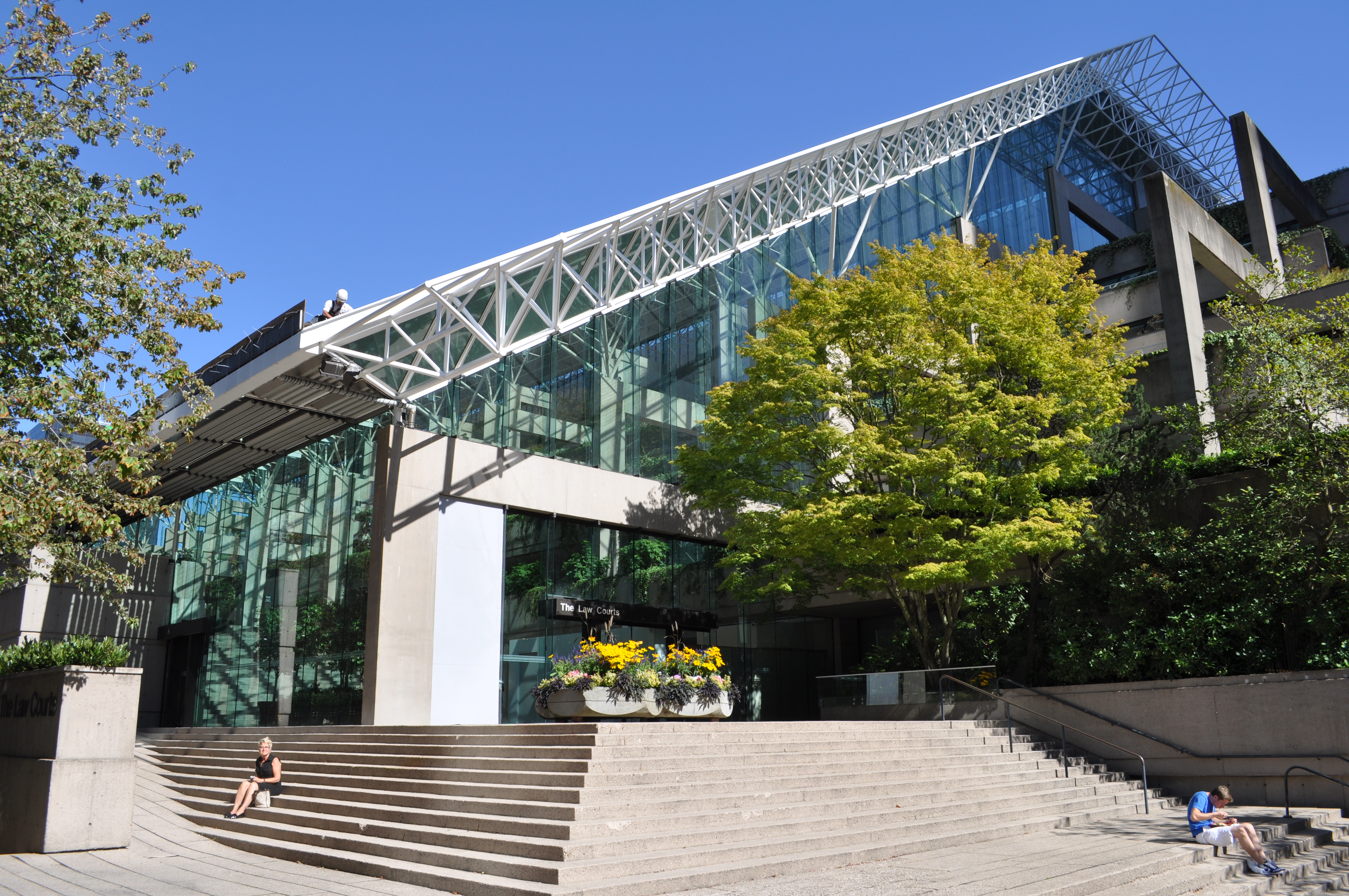
The Law Courts in Vancouver British Columbia

== See also ==
- Courts of England and Wales
- List of courthouses
