= Shafia family murders =

2009 murders in Kingston, Ontario, Canada

Coordinates: 44.293014°N 76.441766°W

The Shafia family murders took place on June 30, 2009, in Kingston, Ontario, Canada. The Shafia sisters, Zainab, 19, Sahar, 17, and Geeti, 13, along with their father's first wife, Rona Muhammad Omar, 52 (all of Afghan origin), were found dead inside a submerged car in front of the northernmost Kingston Mills lock of the Rideau Canal, after being reported missing. Zainab, Sahar, and Geeti were daughters of Mohammad Shafia, 58, and his second wife, Tooba Mohammad Yahya, 41. The couple also had four additional children including son Hamed, 20. Rona was Mohammad Shafia’s infertile first wife within their polygamous household.

On July 23, 2009, Mohammad, Tooba Yahya, and Hamed were arrested on charges of four counts of first-degree murder and conspiracy to commit murder under the guise of an honour killing. The jury found them guilty on all four counts in January 2012. The trial, which took place at the Frontenac County Court House, was believed to be the first in Canada to be conducted in four languages – English, French, Dari and Spanish.

== Background ==
In 1978, Mohammad Shafia married Rona Mohammed. The couple did not have children, and medical tests confirmed that Rona was unable to have children. In keeping with Afghan custom, and at Rona's behest, Mohammad Shafia took Tooba Yahya as his second wife. The second wedding took place in 1988, and many of the wedding photographs feature Shafia flanked by his two wives. The three of them lived together in one household, and Tooba gave birth to seven children. Rona participated in raising and caring for the children and bonded with them as though they were her own. Her relationship with Tooba was less than idyllic.

The Shafia family left Afghanistan in 1992. They moved to Australia for a brief time. Later, they relocated to the United Arab Emirates, where they lived for over a decade. Mohammad Shafia made a considerable fortune in Dubai, working in the used car business and later diversifying into real estate. By 2007, he was a multimillionaire. He soon decided to take advantage of an immigration program introduced by the government of Quebec in Canada which offered permanent residence and eventual citizenship to people who invested significant money in the province. Shafia invested $2 million in purchasing a strip-mall on the outskirts of Montreal; he invested a further $200,000 in building a spacious new house for his family. Shafia, his second wife Tooba, and their seven children immigrated to Canada and settled in the Saint-Léonard borough of Montreal in 2007. Five months later, Shafia sponsored Rona's immigration, telling authorities that she was his cousin and that she would work as a cook and housekeeper.

According to a family member's interview, Rona was trapped in an abusive, loveless marriage, trying in vain to convince her husband to grant her a divorce. Rona's siblings claimed that she feared for her life during the days leading up to her death. Tooba allegedly said to Rona, "You are a slave; you are a servant." Reportedly, the Shafias held all of Rona's identity documents, including her passport, so Rona believed she could not flee to another country where she had relatives. The Montreal Gazette reported that Rona emigrated to Canada as a domestic servant on a visitor's visa and that her husband and co-wife "held [the visa's renewal] over her head like an axe ready to fall."

The interviewed family member also stated that the Shafia family's eldest daughter, Zainab, was in a relationship with a Pakistani boy that elicited much anger from her father; the family member claimed to have overheard the father's threats to kill Zainab.

With Mohammad Shafia, Tooba Mohammad Yahya, and their eldest son Hamed Shafia all in custody during the trial, the remaining Shafia children, two girls and a boy, were being cared for by social services.

== Investigation ==
On June 30, 2009, a worker at the Kingston Mills locks discovered a black Nissan Sentra with a broken left taillight submerged in the water. Divers discovered four female bodies floating inside. Mohammad Shafia was at the Kingston Police station to report that four of his family members – three teenage daughters and a purported aunt – were missing. Police initially believed that it was a tragic, if bizarre, accident; they first categorized it as a "sudden death investigation."

However, authorities soon learned that Hamed had reported an accident with the family Lexus SUV in an empty parking lot earlier that same morning in Montreal. Despite their suspicions, authorities did not have "reasonable and probable grounds" or sufficient evidence to ask a judge for a search warrant. Kingston Police Det. Steve Koopman, the liaison with the Shafia family, managed to gain the Shafia family's consent to view the Lexus. After assessing the damage on both vehicles, police theorized that the Lexus was used to ram the Nissan into the locks.

It had been reported that the Shafia family purchased the used Nissan Sentra for CAD $5,000 on the day prior to the family leaving Montreal for Niagara Falls.

== Trial ==
Jury selection began on October 11, 2011, and the trial officially began on October 20 the same year. Ontario Superior Court Judge Robert Maranger presided over the trial.

=== Verdict ===
On January 29, 2012, after 15 hours of deliberation, a jury found each of the three defendants guilty of four counts of first-degree murder. In Canada, first-degree murder verdicts carry an automatic sentence of life without the possibility of parole for 25 years.

== Media coverage of the Shafia murder trial ==
The coverage of the Shafia murder trial was widespread, often being on the front page of newspapers and the top story in TV newscasts. Since the case involved Afghan Canadians, questions arose as to whether or not it was correct, or even appropriate, to call the murders honour killings or simply domestic violence. While the judge who presided over the case referred to the deaths simply as murders, the media chose a different course when it called the murders "honour killings." Across media outlets, the murder was framed as such. A publication ban placed on the case prevented the media from naming the three surviving children in the care of Canadian social services.

=== CBC ===
CBC News covered the trials extensively from the first day; they went a step further by publishing its audience's comments to show how Canadians felt about the case and its details. The CBC stated that the published comments were a chosen representative "summary" sampling out of the much higher number of comments the story garnered, and moreover that Canadians generally "agreed with the verdict, applauding the court and the jury for its decision after the three-month trial."

=== CTV ===
CTV News published a piece stating that the trial cast a shadow over Canada's Islamic community, further tarnishing an image that had not yet recovered from the events of 9/11. However, like other media outlets, CTV asked the Muslim community to clarify their stance on the issue of honour killing: "Muslims across the country, however, say the revelations in a Kingston, Ont., courtroom have shone a light on problematic aspects of their culture and illuminated new ways to tackle the issues."

CTV also published a timeline spanning the gamut from the Shafia family's days in Afghanistan to the events that took place in Canada.

=== Ottawa Citizen ===
Pascale Fournier, writing for The Ottawa Citizen, said that there was a greater tragedy in the failure of the state to intervene before the murders occurred. He also said that while vulnerable groups from immigrant communities need the most protection, they rarely receive it from authorities.

=== The Globe and Mail ===
In addition to covering every detail of the trial, The Globe and Mail published a piece with the "ten most shocking quotes" from the Shafia trial. One of the quotes was by Crown attorney Gerard Laarhuis after the verdicts, and it read as follows: "This jury found that four strong, vivacious and freedom-loving women were murdered by their own family in the most troubling of circumstances. We all think of these four wonderful women now who died needless deaths. This verdict sends a very clear message about our Canadian values and the core principles in a free and democratic society that both Canadians and visitors to Canada enjoy."

This was one of the most criticized quotes by Afghan Canadians; they asserted that intolerance towards violence against women is not just a Canadian value, but a universal value. They also asserted that Afghans, like any other peoples, condemn the acts of the perpetrators.

=== Montreal Gazette ===
The Montreal Gazette published a column in which it said that labelling the murders as honour killing is a mistake as domestic violence against women is ubiquitous and framing it as a particular paradigm would mean distancing oneself from a crime that is all too common. The authors argue that premeditation is put forth as a core component to differentiate honour killings from other types of murders, such as crimes of convenience or passion. However, recent studies indicate that premeditation is as much a component in other cases of domestic violence and murder as it is in "honour killings".

"Calling the murders 'honour killings' accomplishes two goals. First, it makes it seem as if femicide is a highly unusual event. Second, it makes it seem as if femicide is confined to specific populations within Canada and specific national cultures or religions in the world at large. But Canadian statistics prove otherwise. According to StatsCan figures, from 2000 to 2009 an average of 58 women a year were killed in this country as a result of spousal violence. In that same period, 67 children and young people aged 12 to 17 were murdered by family members. In contrast, recent estimates tell us that there have been 12 or 13 so-called honour killings in Canada in the last decade. It does not take a genius to see that comparing 12 or 13 against the hundreds of women and children who were victims of familial violence serves only to frame 'honour killing' as peculiar, when in reality it is part of a larger pattern of violence against women."

=== Maclean's ===
Maclean's referred to the four murders as "honouricide." Writer Michael Friscolanti sat throughout the three-month trial and wrote a 22-page comprehensive article detailing the girls' lives and even wrote about how one of the girls' tombstones has the incorrect birthdate.

"In life, and in death, they had no voice," Friscolanti wrote. "No one to save them. No one who even cares enough to fix Geeti's headstone. Nearly three years after she was buried, it is still engraved with Sahar's birth-date, not hers."

== Reaction ==
=== Muslims in Canada ===
The murders gave rise to the debate about the relationship between honour killing and Islam. Islamic organizations based in Canada condemned the murders. The Islamic Supreme Council of Canada, along with other Canadian Muslim organizations, have publicly denounced domestic violence and honour killing as un-Islamic. Ali Falih Altaie, the family imam, said that the murders were unforgivable; he also cautioned against associating honour crimes with Islam, calling the actions incompatible with any religion.

In 2012 imams from across Canada and the U.S. issued a moral ruling officially condemning honour killings, domestic violence, and misogyny as un-Islamic. Thirty-four imams belonging to the Islamic Supreme Council of Canada, including a handful of American members, signed the fatwa in an effort to counter misinterpretations of the Qur'an.

=== Afghan Canadians ===
In an interview with CTV News, the Afghan Embassy in Ottawa condemned the murders of the four members of the Shafia family. The embassy called the deaths of the three teenage sisters and their father's first wife a heinous crime against humanity. Moreover, they claimed that this kind of crime is not part of Afghan or Islamic culture and is not acceptable in any way.

== See also ==
- List of solved missing person cases (2000s)
- Murder of Aqsa Parvez
- Murder of Anooshe Sediq Ghulam
- Murder of Morsal Obeidi
