= Thomas Burrowes (artist) =

British artist (1796–1866)

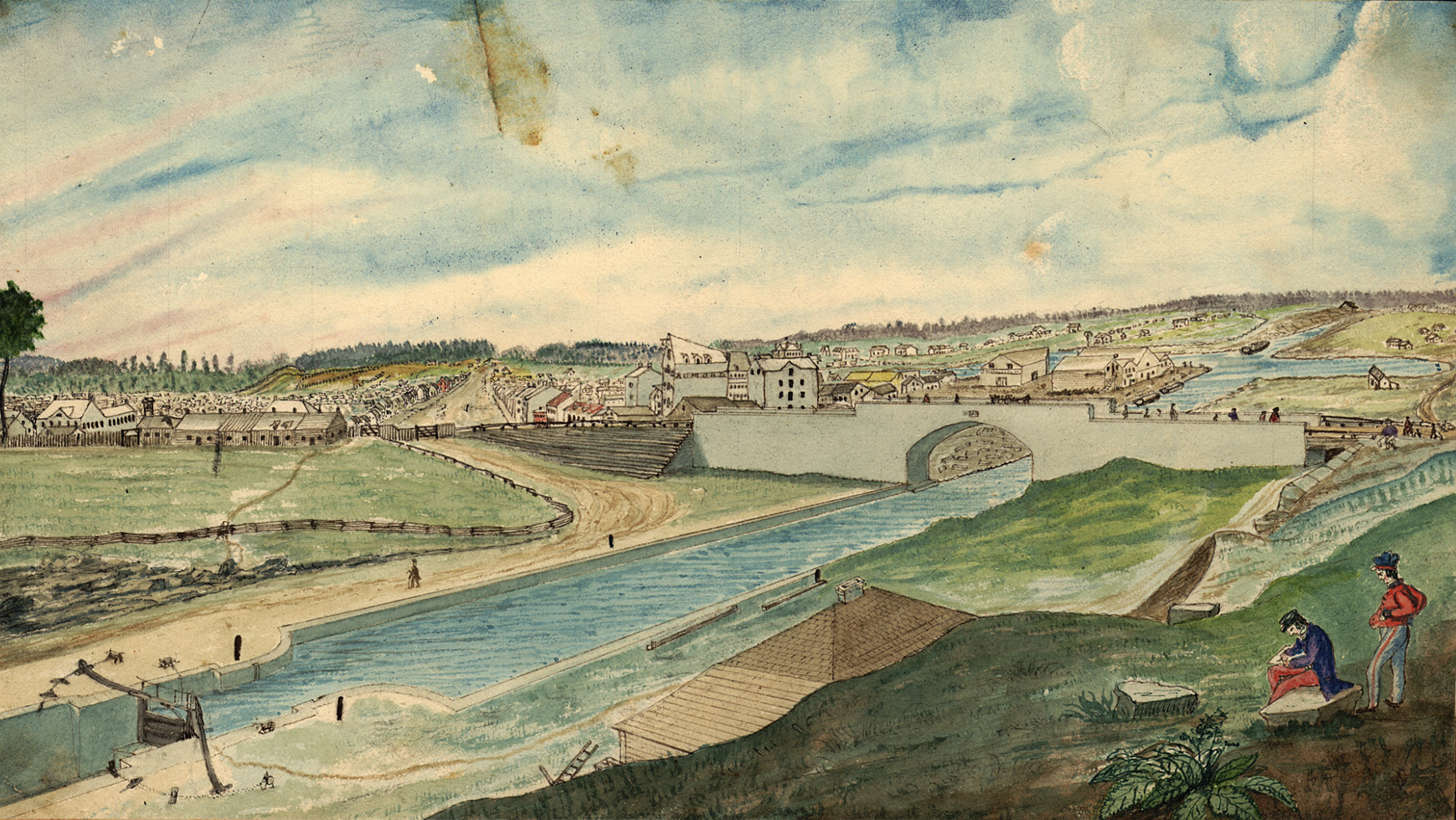
- A painting by Burrowes of the Rideau Canal and Lower Bytown in 1845, as viewed from Barrack Hill (later Parliament Hill)
- Born: 27 October 1796; Worcestershire, England
- Died: 21 May 1866 (aged 69); Kingston Mills, Province of Canada
- Known for: Watercolourist
- Spouses: Grace Rodgers (m.1819-1827); Margaret Morrision Burrowes (m.1837)

Thomas Burrowes (1796–1866) was a Captain with the Corps of Royal Sappers and Miners who served as both a surveyor and overseer during the construction of the Rideau Canal in Ontario, Canada. Burrowes is known, however, for having documented the construction of the canal and the landscape of the surrounding area in a series of watercolour paintings, thus creating an important eyewitness record of one of the most important engineering projects of 19th century Canada.

== Biography ==
Burrowes was born in 1796 in Worcester, England. At the age of 17, he enlisted in the Corps of Royal Sappers and Miners, and he was posted to Fort Henry in Upper Canada in 1815. In 1826, he joined a team assembling in Montreal to build a military canal linking Lake Ontario to the Ottawa River and worked for 20 years (1826 to 1846) as a civilian employee on the Rideau Canal project as overseer, surveyor and clerk. Assigned to Bytown (the settlement that later became Ottawa, the capital of Canada), Burrowes served as Assistant Overseer of Works for the Rideau Canal project. He was one of the first persons to take up land and build a home on Wellington Street, the road upon which Canada's Parliament Buildings would be built decades later.

In 1829, Burrowes was posted to Kingston Mills, upstream from Kingston, where he served as Clerk of the Works of the Cataraqui section of the Rideau Canal until his retirement in 1846. In 1819, he married Grace Rodgers and till 1826 had 3 sons with her. In 1826, the family moved from Montreal to Bytown. It was in Bytown that their 4th son (namely, John By Burrowes) was born but he died just after 7 months and, was later followed by his mother Grace, who died in 1827. After about 10 years, Thomas considered remarriage and married Margaret Morrision and had 7 children (6 girls, 1 boy) with her, all born at Kingston Mills. In retirement, Burrowes worked as a farmer, supplementing his income by serving both as a postmaster and Justice of the Peace in Kingston Mills. Burrowes died in 1866. His home, Maplehurst, still stands.

== Artwork ==
Throughout his career, Burrowes painted watercolours documenting the construction of the canal and the landscape of Upper Canada. His paintings were discovered in 1907 in the attic of one of Burrowes' daughters in Detroit, Michigan, and were donated to the Archives of Ontario in 1948 by Burrowes' grandson. The paintings have been referred to as "some of the most famous images in Ontario history", constituting "one of the most important ever private donations to the Archives of Ontario".
