= Wellington Street (Ottawa) =

Major street in Ottawa, Canada

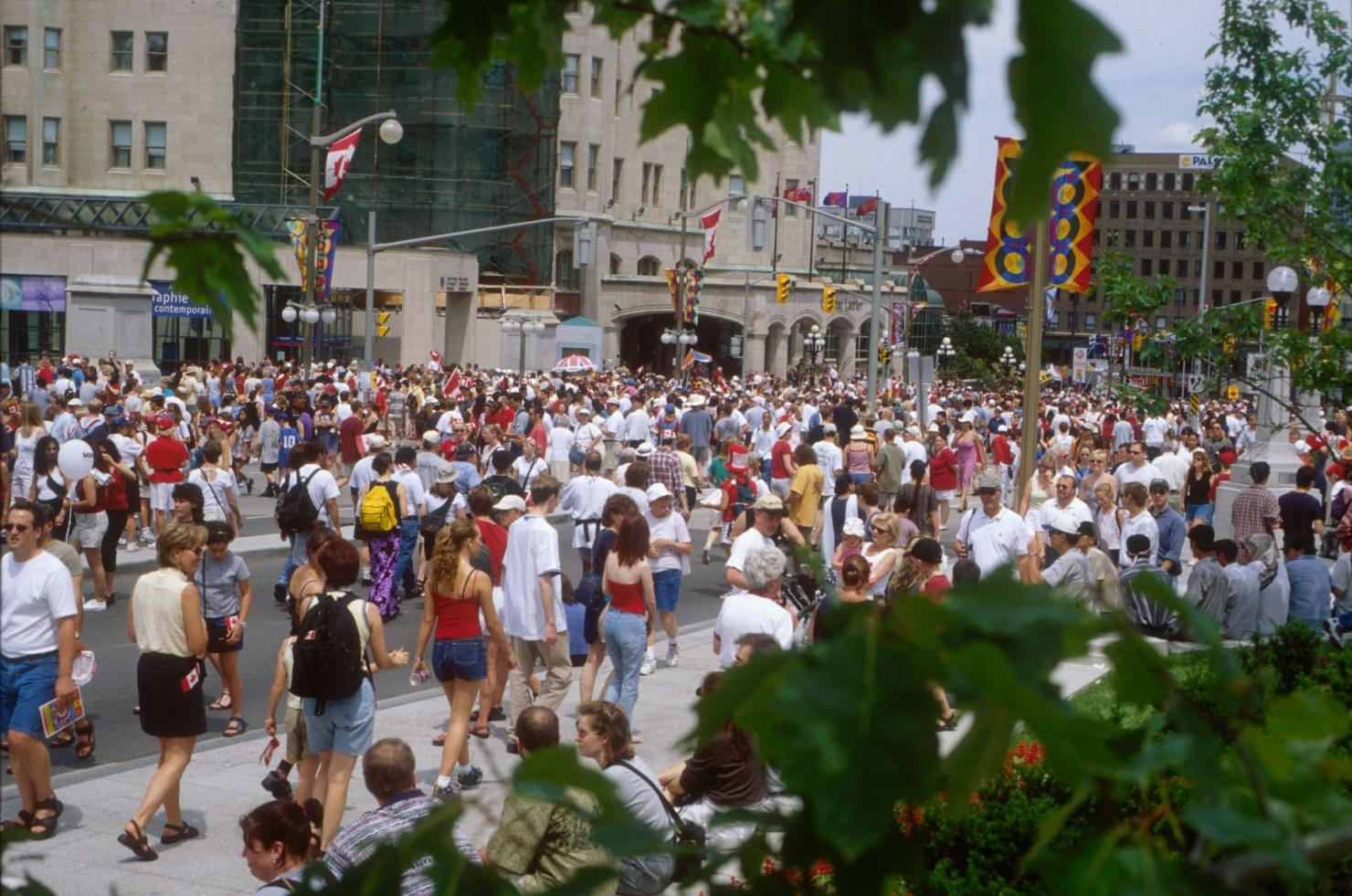
Wellington Street on Canada Day. Wellington's prime location ensures its closure for many public holidays.

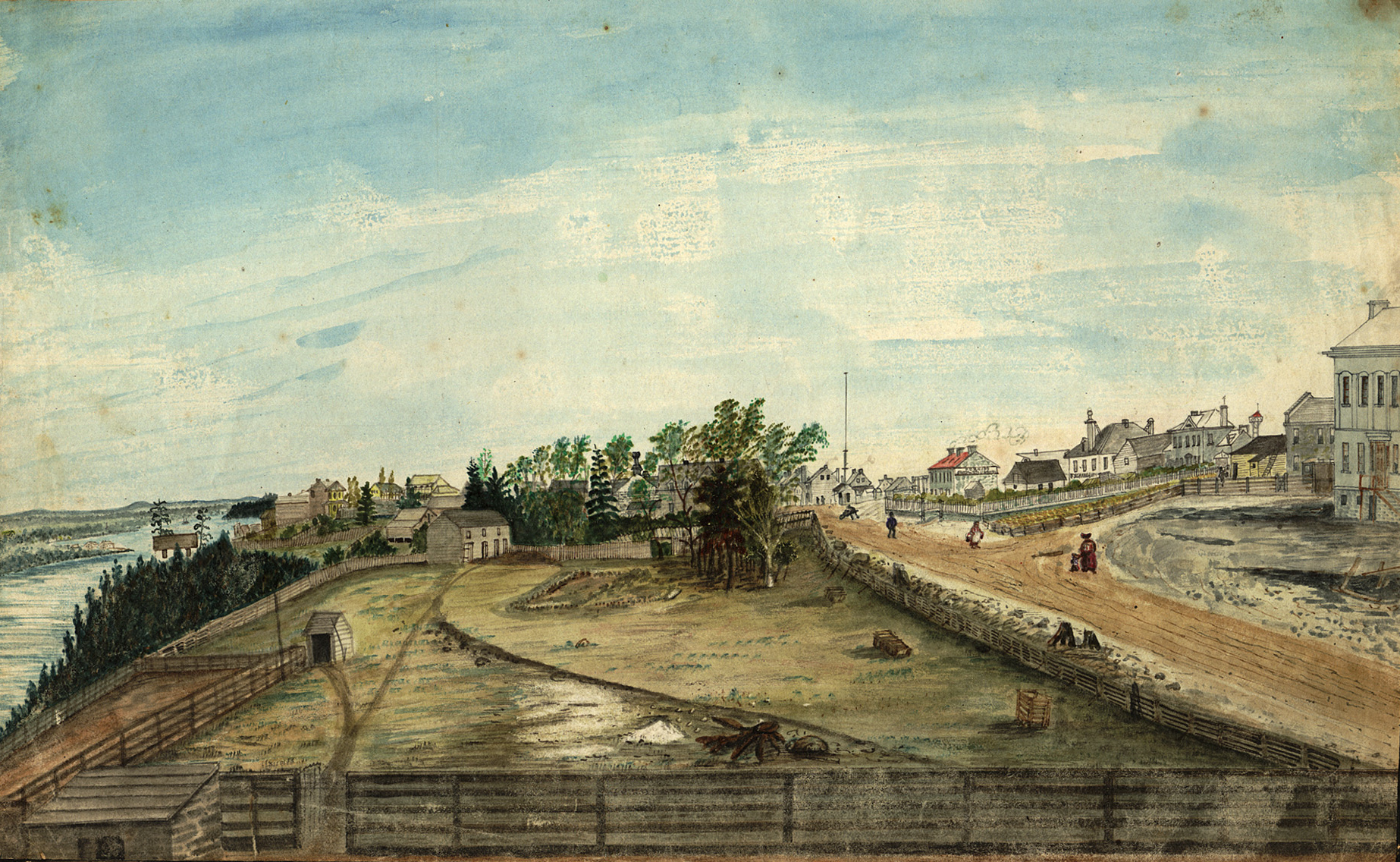
A painting of Wellington Street, looking east, in 1845, by Thomas Burrowes, one of the first persons to take up land and build a home on the street

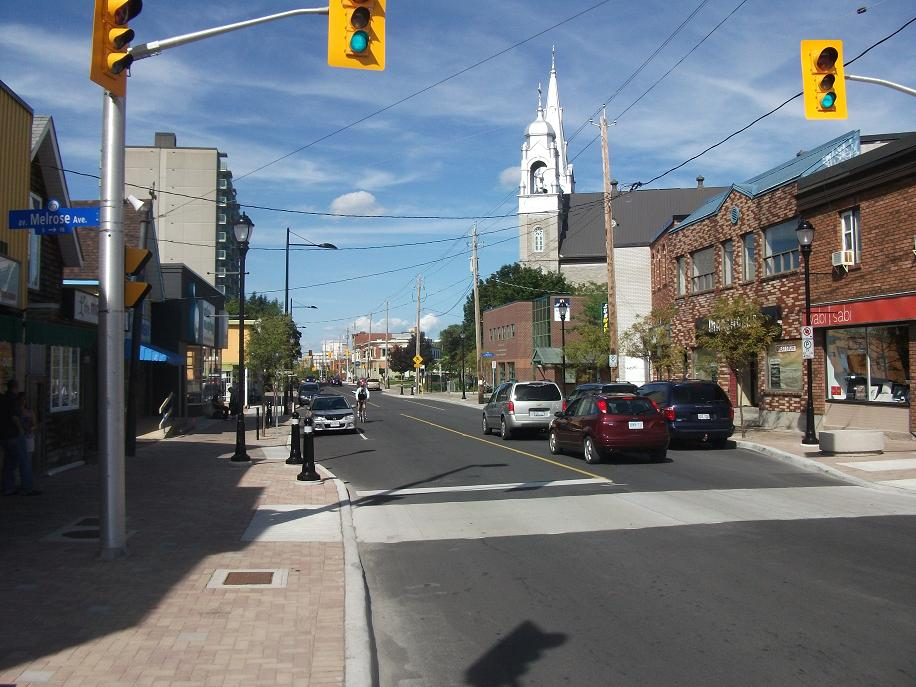
Wellington Street West in Hintonburg

Wellington Street (French: Rue Wellington) is a major street in Ottawa, Canada. It is notable for being the main street of the Parliamentary Precinct of the Parliament of Canada. It is one of the first two streets laid out in Bytown in 1826 (the other being the eastern leg of Wellington, Rideau Street). The street runs from Vimy Place, just west of Booth Street, to the Rideau Canal where it connects with Rideau Street and delimits the northern border of the downtown core. It is named after the Duke of Wellington, in recognition of his role in the creation of the Rideau Canal, and therefore of Ottawa (see History of Ottawa).

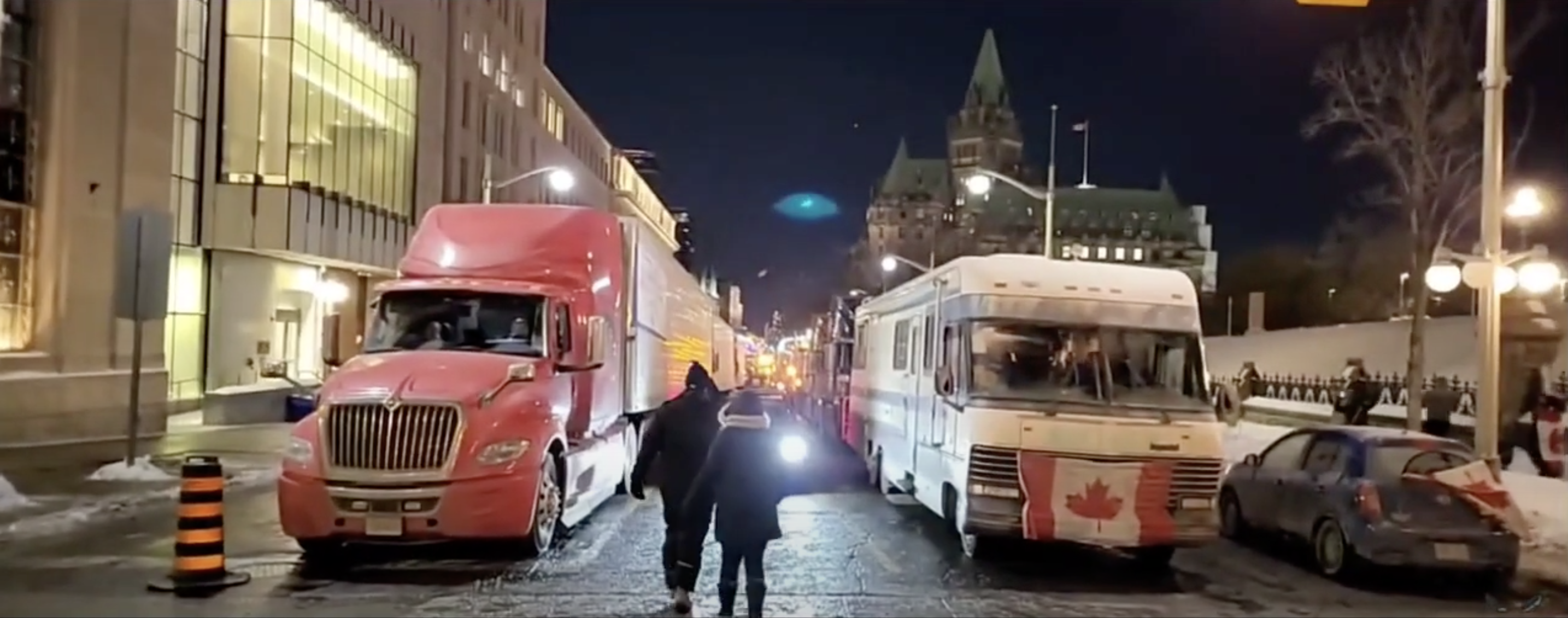
Protesters blocking the road in 2022, as part of the Canada convoy protest.

== Route description ==
Starting at its easternmost point, Wellington forms the northern edge of Confederation Square, south of which runs Elgin Street. West of Confederation Square, Parliament Hill can be found on its north side, while the Langevin Block, home of the Prime Minister's Office and of the Privy Council Office, the former American embassy and the Wellington Building can be found to the south. West of the intersection with Bank Street, are located the Confederation Building and the Justice Building (still considered within the Parliamentary Precinct), while the headquarters of the Bank of Canada can be found opposite the Hill.

Beyond Parliament Hill, the Supreme Court of Canada is situated west of the Justice building, and opposite St. Andrew's Presbyterian Church. The East and West Memorial Buildings are located east and west of Lyon Street, respectively, and linked by the Memorial Arch. West of the Supreme Court is the National Library and Archives of Canada main building, with the Garden of the Provinces across the street. Between the Supreme Court and the National Library is a large open area that is today a mix of parkland and large parking lots. Until the 1970s, this was home to a cluster of temporary buildings that had been erected in the Second World War to provide much-needed office space. In the 1970s, there was a plan to build both a home for the Federal Court and the National Gallery. A design competition was even held for the National Gallery, but in the end, the government cancelled both projects.

Wellington Street continues west past the Portage Bridge, north of the eastern half of the LeBreton Flats, and becomes the Kichi Zībī Mīkan after crossing Vimy Place at LeBreton Flats Park near the Canadian War Museum.

West of the O-Train Bayview station, a separate segment (originally an extension of the same street) is known as Wellington Street West, and passes through the Hintonburg and Island Park neighbourhoods before becoming Richmond Road at Island Park Drive. Prior to the 1980s, Wellington Street extended southwest to meet with Richmond Road at Broad Street, and Richmond Road continued over the C.P.R. tracks on a bridge to what is now Wellington street West. The easternmost portion of this section remains as part of Commissioner Street and feeds into the eastbound lanes of Wellington Street east of the Portage Bridge interchange.

Both sections of Wellington are four-lane historic urban arterial roads with a speed limit of 50 km/h (30 mph), although the flow is generally slower than that due to high pedestrian traffic.

== Street naming ==
=== Alternate names ===
From Bronson Avenue until Rideau Street, Wellington is also known as Ottawa Road #34. From Western Avenue to Somerset Street, Wellington is known as Ottawa Road #36.

=== Street renaming ===
A number of proposals have been made to change the street's name (to honour Sir John A. Macdonald or Pierre E. Trudeau, for example), some as recent as 2010.

== Map ==
Wellington Street from Bay Street to the Rideau Canal showing the prominent structures located along it. See Downtown Ottawa for a map of the entire area.

== Sources ==
- "City of Ottawa map showing Wellington Street downtown" (PDF). Archived from the original (PDF) on 2005-05-25. (1.49 MiB), accessed 15 November 2006
- West Wellington Community Association, accessed 15 November 2006

== See also ==
- List of Ottawa roads
