= Animals in War =

Animals in war usually refers to military animals, the historic and strategic uses of animals in warfare.

Animals in War may also refer to:

- Animals in War Memorial, London
- Animals in War Memorial (Ottawa)
- Animals in War & Peace Medal of Bravery
- Animals in War (book)
