= Animals in War Memorial (Ottawa) =

War memorial in Ottawa, Canada

- Canada
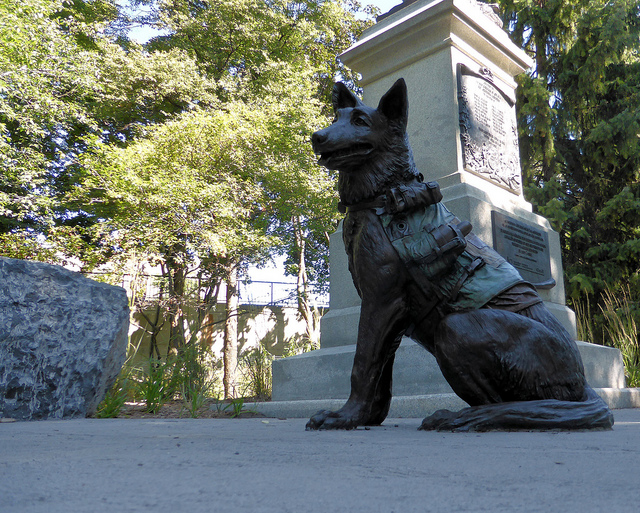
- Memorial Statue of a dog, from the "Ottawa War"
- For animals used by the Canadian military (Canadian Army) in conflicts since the Second Boer War
- Unveiled: November 3, 2012
- Location: 45°25′20.3″N 75°41′32.3″W; Confederation Park near Ottawa, Ontario, Canada
- Designed by: David Clendining

The Animals in War Memorial (officially Animals in War and Les animaux en temps de guerre) is a memorial sculpture located at Confederation Park in Ottawa, Ontario, Canada. It commemorates animals used by the Canadian military (Canadian Army) in conflicts since the Second Boer War (this excludes the use of animals by British Army and French Army before Canada existed as a country).

== Sculptures ==
The memorial consists of three plaques mounted on a stone and sculpture of a dog with foot prints locate next to the South African War Memorial, Ottawa and near the National Aboriginal Veterans Monument. The plaques consists of:

- Dedication to animals at war
- Dedication to Mules
- Dedication to Horses
- Dedication to Dogs

Inscriptions on the plaques are in English and French.

The plaques and sculpture are created by Ottawa-based artist David Clendining with Laureen Harper as honorary patron of the project.

== Construction ==
The memorial was inspired by Lloyd Swick, a World War II and Korean War veteran, who remembered a painting of a horse at war at his high school in 1939. Swick and supporters presented the idea for a memorial to the National Capital Commission Committee in 2010. The memorial became reality and was unveiled on November 3, 2012.

== See also ==
- Animals in War Memorial, a larger memorial located in London and unveiled in 2004
