= Lord Elgin Hotel =

Hotel in Ottawa, Canada

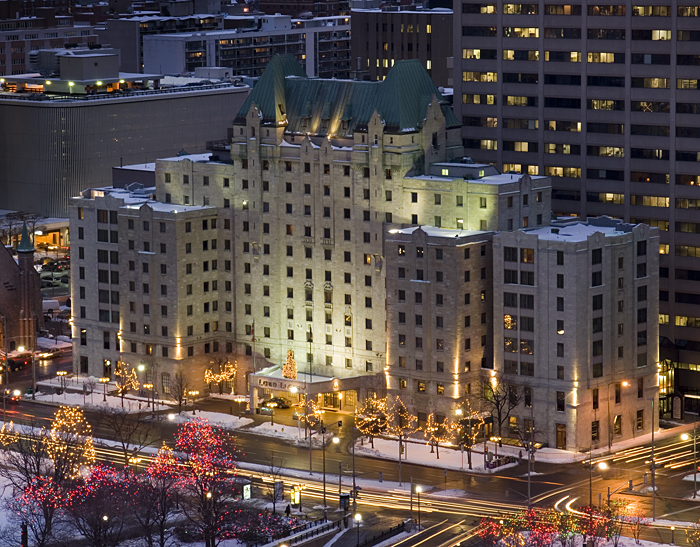
- View of Lord Elgin Hotel from above the Confederation Park
- Interactive map of the Lord Elgin Hotel area

General information
- Location: 100 Elgin Street; Ottawa, Ontario; K1P 5K8
- Coordinates: 45.42133°N 75.69371°W
- Opened: July 19, 1941

Other information
- Number of rooms: 355

Website
- Official website

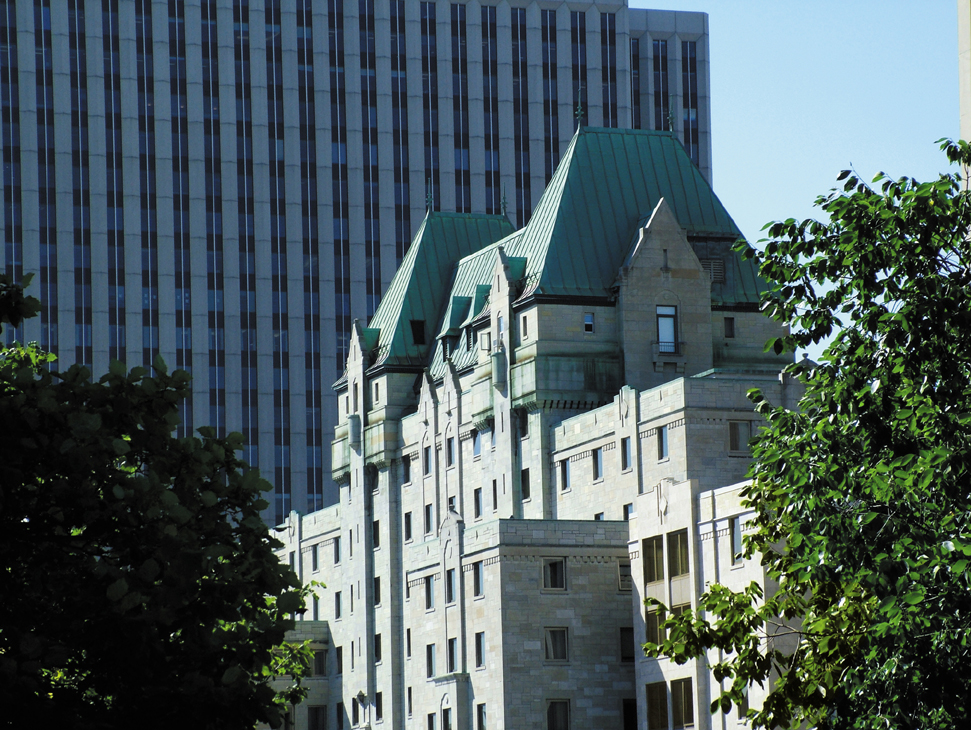
Detail of the hotel's chateauesque roof.

The Lord Elgin Hotel is a prominent hotel in Ottawa, Ontario, Canada. With 355 guest rooms, it is located at 100 Elgin Street at Laurier Avenue, across from Confederation Park in Downtown Ottawa. The twelve-storey limestone structure was named after James Bruce, 8th Earl of Elgin, the first Governor General of the united Canadas.

== About ==
The Lord Elgin Hotel has 355 guestrooms and four suites, all of them refurbished since 2001.

== History and architecture ==
The hotel was designed by the firm of Ross and MacDonald, which were the successors of Ross and MacFarlane, who designed the Chateau Laurier. It was opened in July 1941 by R.T. Ford & Company to compete with the Château Laurier. Unlike the Château, however, the Lord Elgin was built to primarily serve short-stay guests, particularly those who were in Ottawa on government and military business during the Second World War, especially after the recent loss of the nearby Russell Hotel. As a result, the hotel did not originally contain any ballrooms or elegant restaurants, as would have been expected in a large hotel at that time, and the guest rooms were relatively small.

The building features stone walls which are complete with broken courses and are finished by flattened oriel windows and modernistic chevrons. The building is topped by a steep copper chateauesque roof, which, William Lyon Mackenzie King apparently urged the architects to include to reflect the Parliament buildings copper roof.

In the 1970s and 1980s, the hotel's impressive facade hid the decline in its fortunes due to changes in the economy, increased competition from international hotel chains also located in the downtown core, and new demands from an ever-evolving younger traveling business class. Significant renovations in the 1990s and 2000s resulted in the construction of large additions to the north and south of the building, the refurbishment and enlargement of existing rooms, and the addition of 60 new guestrooms, new meeting rooms and a new fitness facility which was finished in 2002.

The interior showcases busts of James Bruce and his wife, Maria Louisa. Contemporary renovations have significantly altered the original streamlined art-deco inspired lobby.
