= Ford Hotel =

Former hotel in Toronto, Ontario, Canada

Coordinates: 43.6563°N 79.3827°W

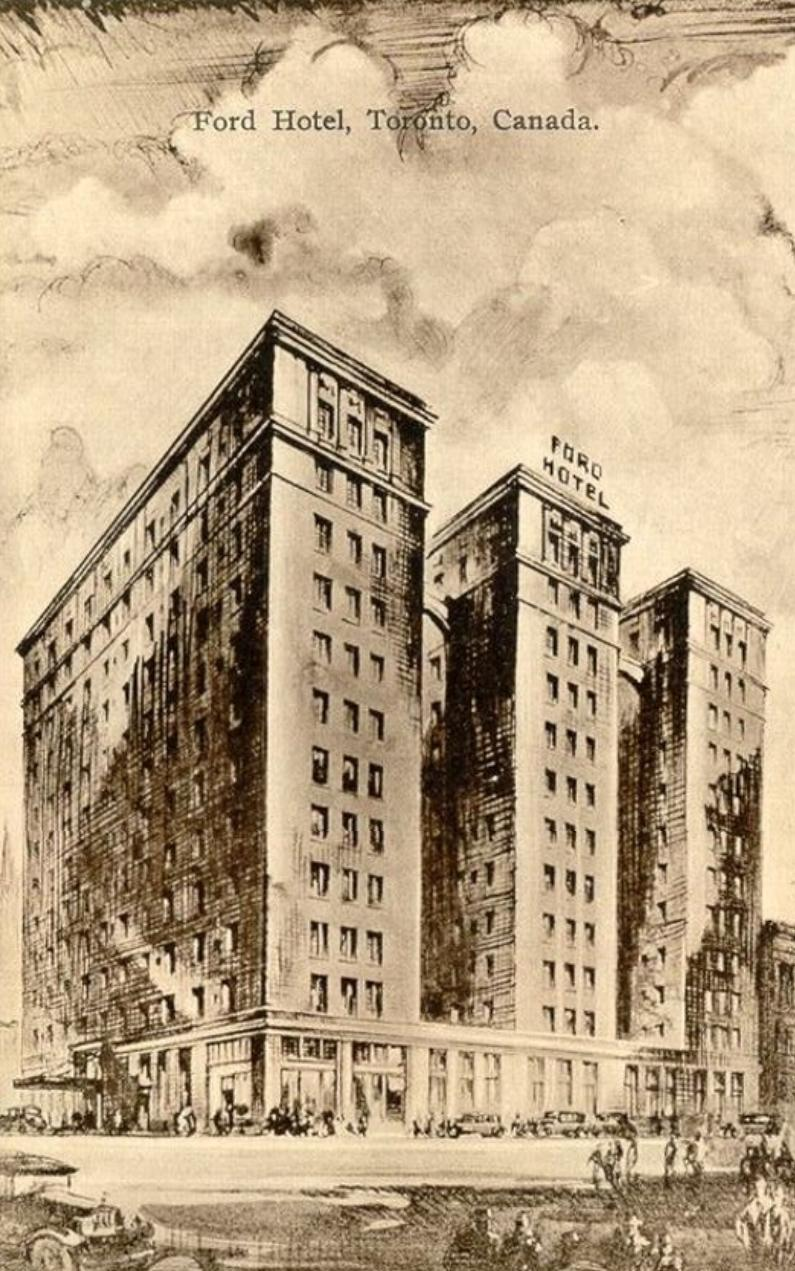
The Ford Hotel

The Ford Hotel was a historic hotel in central Toronto, Ontario, Canada. It was one of five hotels in the R.T. Ford & Company hotel chain and was identical to the Ford Hotel, Buffalo and Ford Hotel, Montreal. The 750-room hotel consisted of three 12-story wings connected at the rear by a perpendicular spine atop a one-story base contained the lobby, restaurants and other amenities. The structure was located on the north side of Dundas Street West, east of Bay Street. It was built in 1928 and for several decades was one of the city's most prominent hotels. The hotel was next to the Toronto Bus Terminal and provided cheap rooms for lower income travellers. It was also well known as a site for crime and vice. The Toronto Star called it the "rendezvous of choice for couples pursuing an illicit affair."

The building was demolished in 1973 and the site is today home to the Atrium on Bay, now known simply as "Atrium".

== Other Ford Hotels ==
All buildings were designed by Rochester architect John Foster Warner (1859–1937) and all but Toronto and Buffalo locations survive today:

- Ford Hotel, Erie – Built in Erie, Pennsylvania, the 400-room hotel located at 515 State Street was renamed Richford Hotel and is now Richford Arms apartments
- Ford Hotel, Buffalo – Built in 1922, the 750-room hotel located at 210-214 Delaware Avenue was later converted as an office tower and home to Buffalo Athletic Club. It was demolished in 1999 and replaced with a parking lot for the Hampton Inn and Suites Hotel.
- Ford Hotel, Rochester – Built in 1915 as the Hotel Richford for Men, a 400-room fireproof hotel. In 1929, the hotel was renamed the Ford Hotel, now for men and women; in 1944 the name went back to Richford. The hotel, at 67 Chestnut Street & Elm Street, operated until 1968 and subsequently became the Richmond Office Building, with multiple tenants until the early 2000s. At some point the building was covered in metal cladding, changing its original appearance. In 2007 the vacant building was sold to a developer to create high-end condominiums with street-level retail. However, due to the recession and other stalled projects in the former Midtown Plaza area, financing has been difficult.
- Hotel Ford, Montreal – Opened in 1930, the 750-room hotel served as CBC-Radio-Canada Montreal headquarters from 1936 to the early seventies. Located at 1425 René-Levesque Ouest, it is now an office building.

== Hotels managed by R.T. Ford & Company ==
- Lord Elgin Hotel, Ottawa – Opened in 1942, this hotel was originally planned as a Ford Hotel. After being lobbied by Ford Hotels president Jack Udd on May 3, 1940, Canadian Prime Minister William Lyon Mackenzie King nixed the idea of building a standard brick-faced Ford Hotel, preferring the construction of a "first class hotel", more befitting the prime location on Elgin Street. The hotel was therefore originally managed by R.T. Ford & Company, but has remained locally owned for most of its existence.
