= Occupy Ottawa =

Protest group against economic inequality

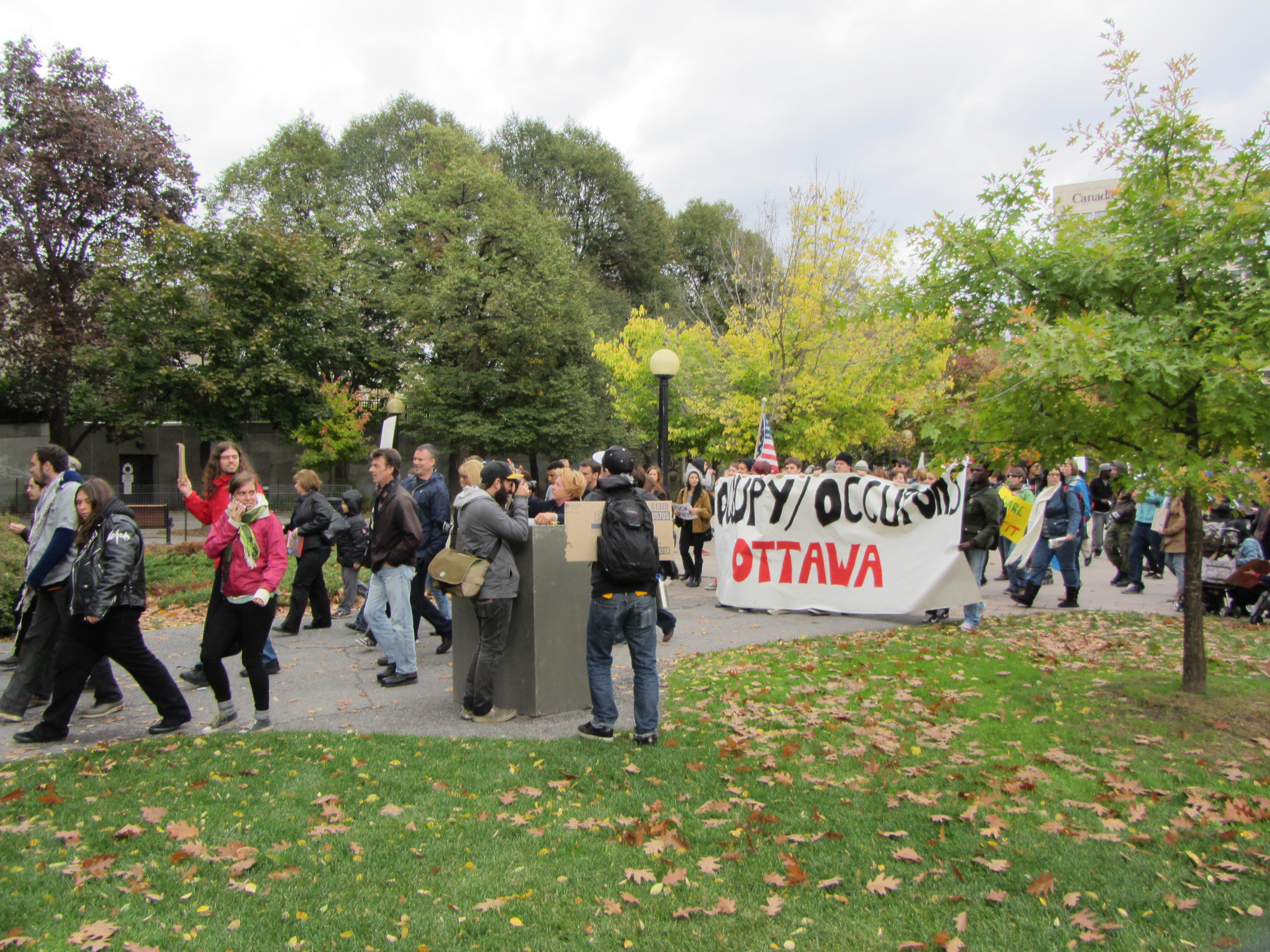
Occupy Ottawa protesters

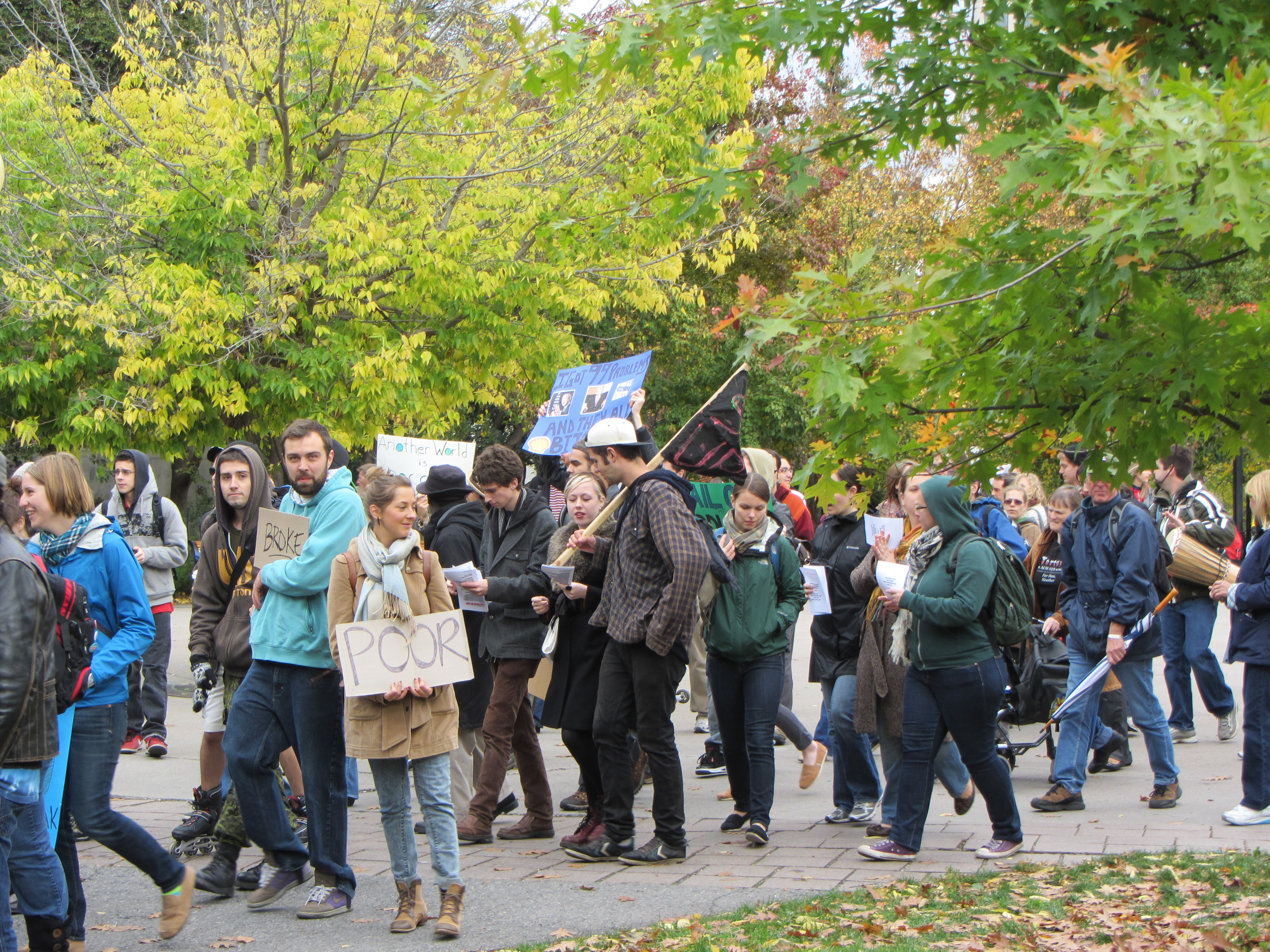
Protesters marching

Occupy Ottawa was a mostly peaceful, leaderless, grassroots and democratic protest movement that began on Confederation Park in Ottawa, Ontario, on October 15, 2011. The movement's slogan "Home of the global revolution in Ottawa" refers to its inspiration by, and association with, the Arab Spring, Occupy Wall Street and the global Occupy Movement, which protests growing economic inequality, corporate greed, and the influence of corporations and lobbyists on electoral politics and government. Occupy Ottawa seeks global economic, social, political and environmental justice.

As of June 2012, Occupy Ottawa had continued to engage in organized meetings, events and actions.

== Global Day of Action ==
On October 15, 2011, the Global Day of Action, over 700 demonstrators gathered around "Freedom Fountain" in Confederation Park for the movement's launch for its inaugural General Assembly. Founding facilitators Ben Powless (Mohawk, Six Nations, Ontario) and Brigette "the Rogue Page" Depape discussed the Occupy Movement's trademark consensus-based democratic processes of deciding and debating issues and protest actions. They discussed the Occupy movement's overriding commitment to participatory democracy, direct democracy, "majority consensus", and stressed the importance of a peaceful demonstration. They also voted to occupy Confederation Park indefinitely. Prominent Canadian public figures among the crowd that day include Green Party leader and Federal MP, Elizabeth May and activist Brigette DePape, a former Canadian Senate Page Program, who famously held up a "Stop Harper!" protest sign during the throne speech of the Government of Canada in the Senate in the summer of 2011.

== Encampment ==
Immediately after the General Assembly, activists set up tents on the northeast corner of the park at the intersection of Laurier Avenue and Elgin Street. Within two weeks, the movement's "tent city" comprised more than 60 tents and tarp-covered shelters, including a kitchen, donations tent and media tent. Somewhere between 75 and 100 people consistently slept in the park. The kitchen, sustained through generous in-kind and cash donations from the public, served activists, visitors and the city's homeless.

== Protest actions ==
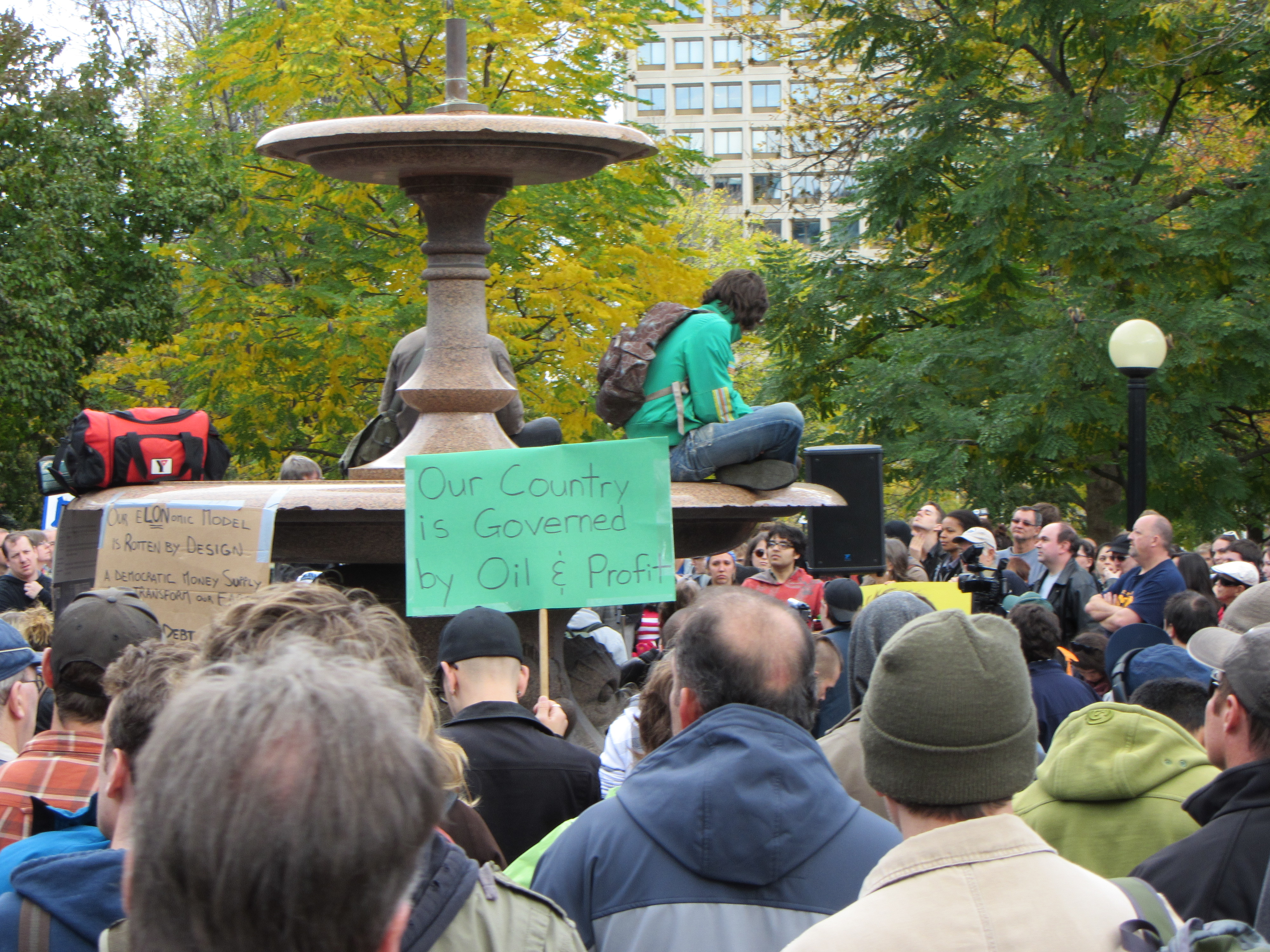
An Occupy Ottawa gathering

Occupy Ottawa or its allies in the capital region organized a series of high-impact public actions. For the most part the movement focused on the issues at the heart of the Occupy movement. However, Occupy Ottawa also undertook actions targeting the national legislative agenda. In fact, some of the actions raised the question whether the movement intends to eventually become political. For example, during its December 3 General Assembly, the movement approved the creation of a "Political Action Committee". The committee's mandate was to create a "political mandate", and spearhead political actions, for the movement.

=== Second global day of action ===
On November 17, Occupy Ottawa activists held simultaneous marches on four key and politically charged Ottawa landmarks. One group marched on the Human Rights Monument to highlight the movement's unequivocal commitment to human rights. The second marched on Sparks Street Mall, Ottawa's corporate and media hub. The group sought to restate the Occupy movement's expressed stance against unfettered corporate greed, growing economic inequality and the perceived mainstream media collusion with the dominant political and economic forces.

The third group targeted two landmarks. First, it marched on the city's Novotel Hotel to protest the hotel's efforts to squash workers' rights to unionize. From there, the group marched through the Rideau Centre, the Byward Market. It finally converged on the United States Embassy on Sussex Drive to express solidarity with Occupy Wall Street, and protest the eviction and police brutality the movement faced at the time.

Later, the three groups later converged on Parliament Hill.

=== Omnibus crime bill C-10 ===
On Saturday, November 26, an estimated 300 activists turned up to peacefully protest the controversial Conservative government's bill, which was currently under debate in the House of Commons. The protest was organized under the aegis of the "Occupy Ottawa Coalition to End Crime Bill C-10". The nine speakers of the day included Angus Toulouse, the regional Chief of the Assembly of First Nations, Françoise Boivin, an MP from the New Democratic Party (NDP), Landon Pearson, a former senator, and representatives of the John Howard Society of Canada, Odawa Native Friendship Centre and Muslims for Progressive Values.

=== Solidarity actions ===
As the crackdown on Occupy camps across Canada intensified, Occupy Ottawa seemed to expand its focus and reach.

==== Solidarity visit to Occupy Kingston ====
Tuesday, December 6, 2011, was a crucial day for Occupy Kingston. It was the day the Kingston City Council voted to evict the occupiers, who had been encamped in Confederation Park since October 15. Occupy Ottawa activists visited their fellow occupiers and were present in the council chambers when the council voted 7–6 against Occupy Kingston.

==== Solidarity with Syria and Egypt ====
On Thursday, December 8, Occupy Ottawa activists participate in a march in support of the struggle for democracy and political change in Syria and Egypt.

==== Perth visit ====
On Sunday, December 11, Occupy Ottawa speakers visited Perth, 83 km outside Ottawa to share their collective and personal experiences with the locals. Over 100 people packed a local pub, O'Reilly's, to hear the speakers. Following the visit, a new Occupy movement, Occupy Lanark County, emerged.

== Controversies ==
The RCMP investigated Occupy Ottawa during the planning phases of the protest.

== Public response ==
Occupy Ottawa's occupation of Confederation Park was largely peaceful with a commitment to nonviolence throughout numerous protest actions.

== Eviction and defiance ==
After weeks of uncertainty, Occupy Ottawa's fate on Confederation Park was decided on the morning of November 21, 2011. The National Capital Commission (NCC), the Canadian Crown Corporation responsible for the park, served the movement with the notice of eviction. More than 300 people gathered for the movement's 6.30pm General Assembly, which unanimously voted to peacefully resist the eviction. In a statement, the movement said:

We began this movement because we want positive change and we know that the old ways of political participation aren't working. These officials are doing the bidding of the 1%. They don't want to listen or engage in dialogue with us because they know we are already changing the conversation in this city, in this country and globally. We will offer dignified and principled resistance to those who try to force us out of public space.

The deadline came and passed without any action from the authorities. Still, up to 100 protesters remained on the park throughout most of the night and waited. However, by the end of the next day, signs of fatigue began to appear. The numbers dwindled. Some of the protesters suggested that the authorities were playing mind games and sought to wear the protesters out. There is some truth to the allegation. By evening, the numbers had dwindled to less than 30.

On the morning of Wednesday, November 23, 2011, around 2.00am and under heavy snowfall, an estimated 150 officers from the Ottawa Police moved into the park and arrested the defiant protesters. While five of the protesters allowed themselves to be peacefully arrested, three made another last stand and chained themselves together in a tent inside the fountain. The police dragged them out of the park. One of the protesters ended up in hospital. All were served $65 trespass tickets and released.

== After eviction ==
Before the eviction, there had been predictions that the harsh Canadian winter would drive Occupy Ottawa out of Confederation Park. But, after losing the park, and the generous media coverage that came with it, Occupy Ottawa seems to have gained new strength. The numbers have dwindled but the movement still holds two to three General Assemblies a week. New committees, working groups or initiatives emerged in December 2011 and January 2012, including a political action committee and "InterOccupy" and "Threads of Occupation" working groups. The committees and working groups meet regularly during the week and constantly engage in direct actions. Assisting these efforts is a robust media apparatus that includes a communally edited website that features a Community News page, Forums, Facebook Page, Facebook Groups, Twitter Profile and YouTube account.

Approximately a year after the initial occupation, the group changed its name to Occupied Ottawa.

== See also ==
- Arab Spring
- Corporatocracy
- Federal Political Financing in Canada
- List of Occupy movement protest locations
- Occupy Canada
- The Shock Doctrine
- Voter turnout in Canada
- We Are The 99%
