= Animals in War (book) =

Military history of animals

- Author: Jilly Cooper
- Language: English
- Subject: History of animals used by the armed forces
- Publication date: 1983
- Publication place: United Kingdom
- Website: https://www.jillycooper.co.uk/books/animals-in-war/

Animals in War is a 1983 non-fiction book by English author Jilly Cooper. It is a history of the use of animals by the military and examines the roles of a range of species across conflicts. The book was commissioned by the Imperial War Museum to coincide with its Animals in War exhibition. The book was reviewed at its time of publication positively, with reviewers praising its insight and the range of animals, conflicts and time periods covered. Academic analyses from Hilda Kean and Gary Genosko have recognised that the book over-emphasises the agency that trained military animals have or alternatively, as with the work of Steven Johnston, have re-framed some of Cooper's accounts as acts of resistance by animals. Public response to the book led to a campaign to establish a memorial to animals who were used and died in the service of the British military.

== Synopsis ==
The book is a history of the many and varied uses the military have found for animals from a wide range of periods and regions. Animals focused on in the work include horses and mules, dogs and carrier pigeons, as well as lesser known military animals such as dolphins, glow-worms and bees. The book uses stories of individual animals to bring attention to broader themes. Many of the stories of animals focus on the First and Second World Wars, but other historic and contemporary conflicts are included, the most recent of which are the horses injured in the Hyde Park and Regent's Park bombings.

== Background ==
The book was commissioned by the Imperial War Museum to coincide with its Animals in War exhibition. In the foreword to the book, Cooper thanked the staff of the museum and expressed gratitude to the authors J. M. Brereton and Major T. J. Edwards for the inspiration she drew from their respective works The Horse in War and Mascots and Pets of the Regiments. Prior to its release, the book was serialised in The Mail on Sunday.

== Reception ==
In 1983 the Wolverhampton Express & Star described the book as "a fascinating, thrilling and humbling series of tales" and praised its temporal and geographic spread. The same year the Leicester Mercury praised Cooper's sympathy and insight and described the volume as a "fascinating account of how animals have bravely and loyally" served the military. The Western Daily Press highlighted the role of insects, such as bees, in war in its positive review. In a 2020 article historian Sybil Jack described how the book was a "tribute" to animals who served. The book has been used as a source by others to provide examples of stories about different breeds of dog in wartime, connecting temperament with aspects of service, including bull terriers, King Charles spaniels, and greyhounds.

== Analysis ==
Writing in 1991 Gary Genosko described how Cooper "draws heavily" on the 1925 book Animal Heroes of the Great War by Ernest Harold Baynes, and uses Baynes' interpretation of First World War records to approach those for animals in the Second World War. Genosko also described how Cooper created a dichotomy of morality between "bad" uses of animals in war and "good" in her analysis. Hilda Kean described in a 2015 article how the book really focuses on human reactions to animals' experiences, rather than those of the animals themselves. Kean also compared this book to The Animals' War by Juliet Gardiner. Writing in 2017 Colin Salter commented on Cooper's framing of animals that carried explosives as "suicide-dogs" or similar, as falsely claiming that these animals had agency in what they doing. These animals were trained to undertake these tasks using starvation, so the behaviour was not done out of choice.

In his article on animals, war and patriotism, political scientist Steven Johnston draws on Cooper's book to discuss how people treat their pets during wartime. He also suggests that Cooper's approach "inadvertently documents the resistance of animals"; where Cooper reads personality in an animals actions, Johnston suggests the animal's action can be read as resistance to the roles they have been trained for. One case is with mules, who Cooper describes as "mischievous", but Johnston counters this as defiance. He also suggests that Cooper's book emphasises the "disposability" of animals, and that its overarching tone eulogises them.

== Legacy ==
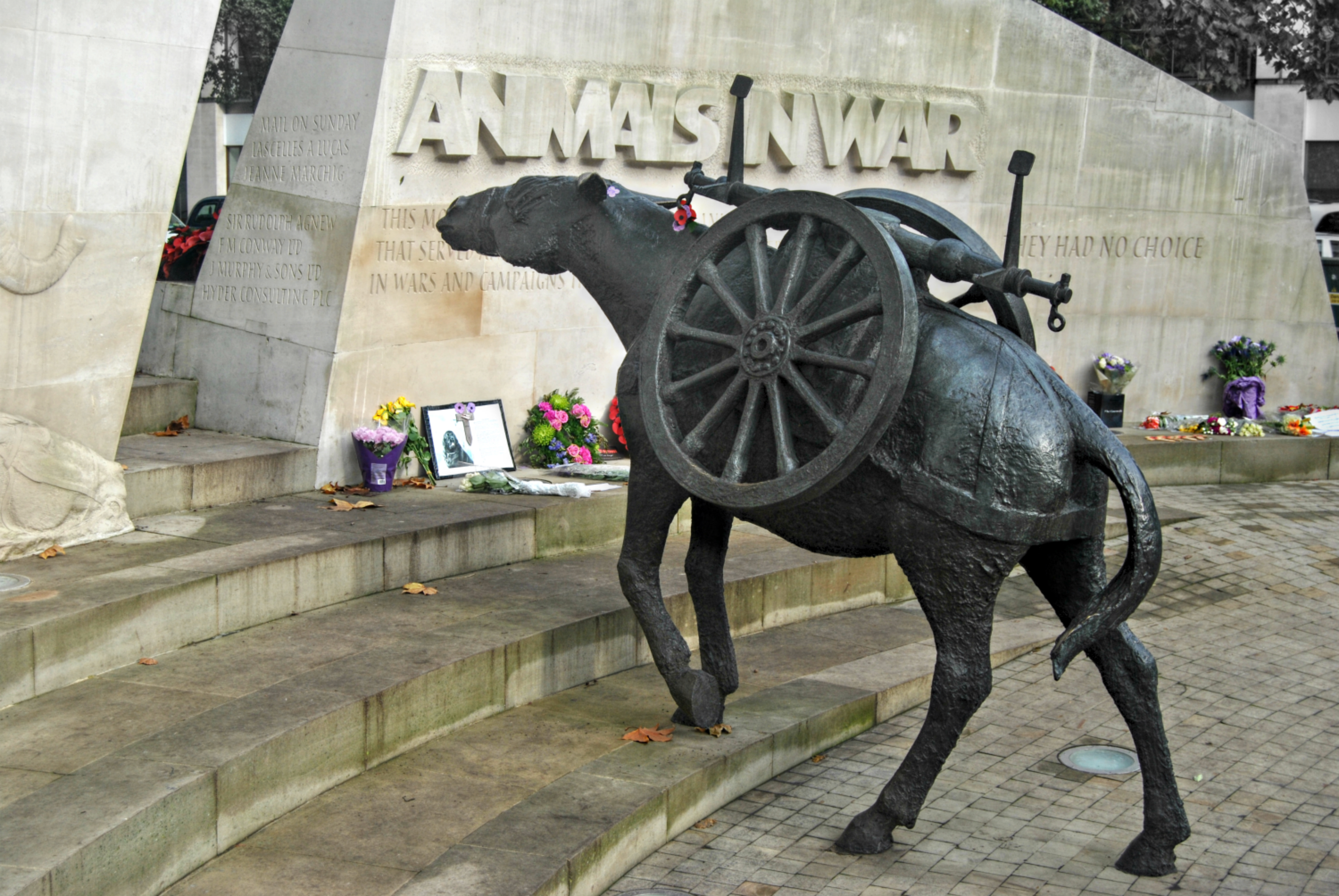
Animals in War Memorial (2014)

Public response to the book led to a campaign to establish a memorial to animals who died in the service of the British military. The book was republished in 2003 to raise money for the Animals in War Memorial Fund. This led to the construction of the Animals in War Memorial in Hyde Park, London. It was unveiled in 2004. Cooper was a co-trustee of the association formed to support the creation of the memorial.
