= Confederation Park =

Confederation Park Parc de la Confédération (French)
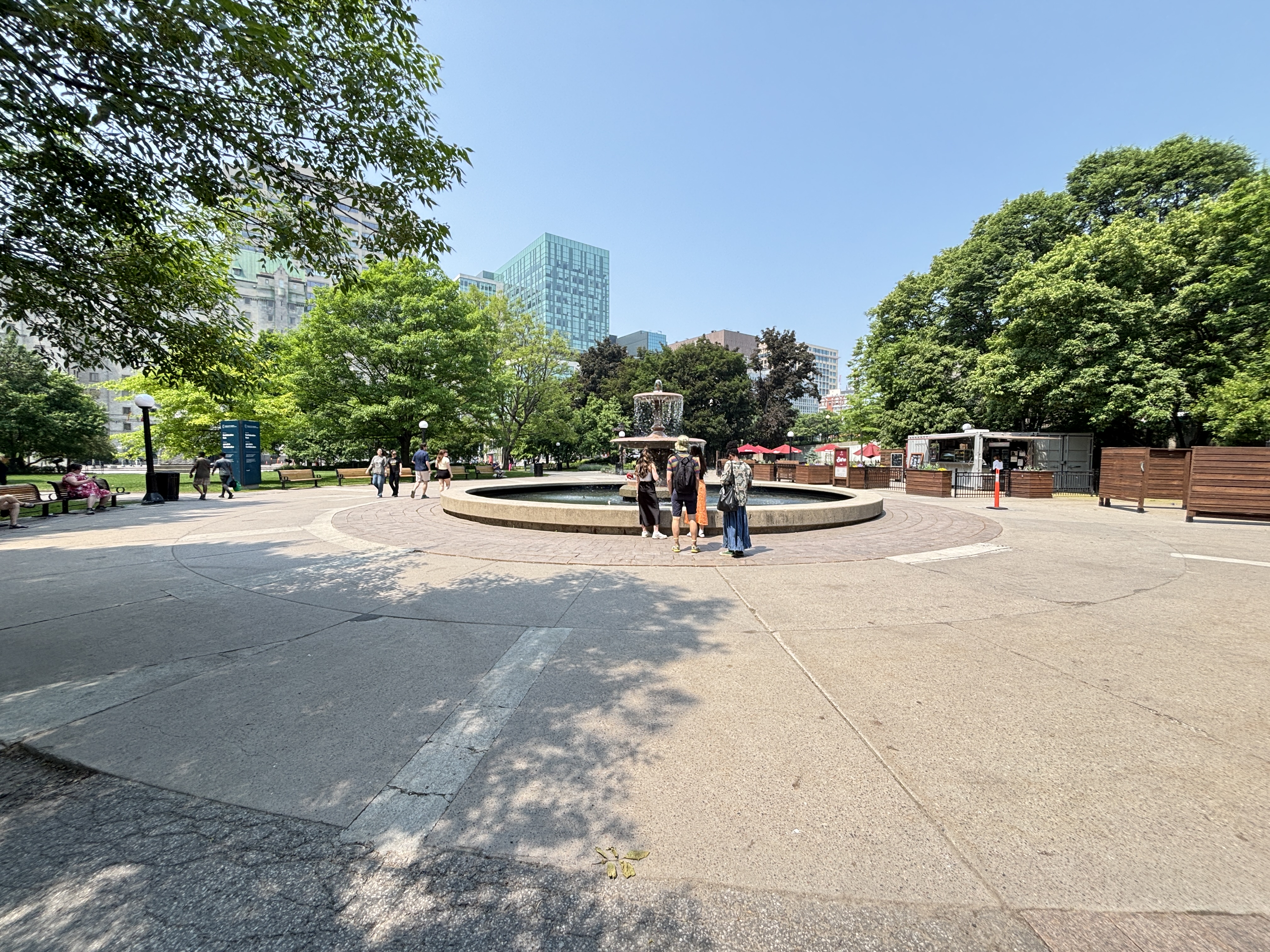
- The fountain in Confederation Park (2025)
- Interactive map of Confederation Park; Parc de la Confédération (French)
- 45°25′20″N 75°41′31″W
- Location: Ottawa, Ontario, Canada

Site notes
- Governing body: Parks Canada
- Website: 360 Panorama from OttawaKiosk.com

National Historic Site of Canada

Confederation Park (French: Parc de la Confédération) is a public park and National Historic Site of Canada, located in the downtown core of Ottawa, Ontario, Canada. It is bordered on the south by Laurier Avenue and Ottawa City Hall; on the east by the Rideau Canal and National Defence Headquarters; on the north by the Mackenzie King Bridge, the Rideau Centre and the National Arts Centre; and to the west by Elgin Street and the Lord Elgin Hotel.

== Situation ==
Confederation Park is one of the 'capital' parks in Ottawa maintained by the National Capital Commission (NCC). It is an urban park, with paved pathways, monuments and an open lawn on the eastern side for gatherings. It is basically flat in its topology. A large fountain is located in the centre of the park. Constructed of Peterhead granite, it honors Colonel John By. The fountain was relocated from Trafalgar Square, London, where it had played from 1845 to 1948. A twin of the fountain, which had also stood in Trafalgar Square, is located in Wascana Park, Regina. The park also is the site of a totem pole donated to the City of Ottawa to commemorate British Columbia's 1971 centennial, the National Aboriginal Veterans Monument and a Boer War memorial statue.

=== Photos ===
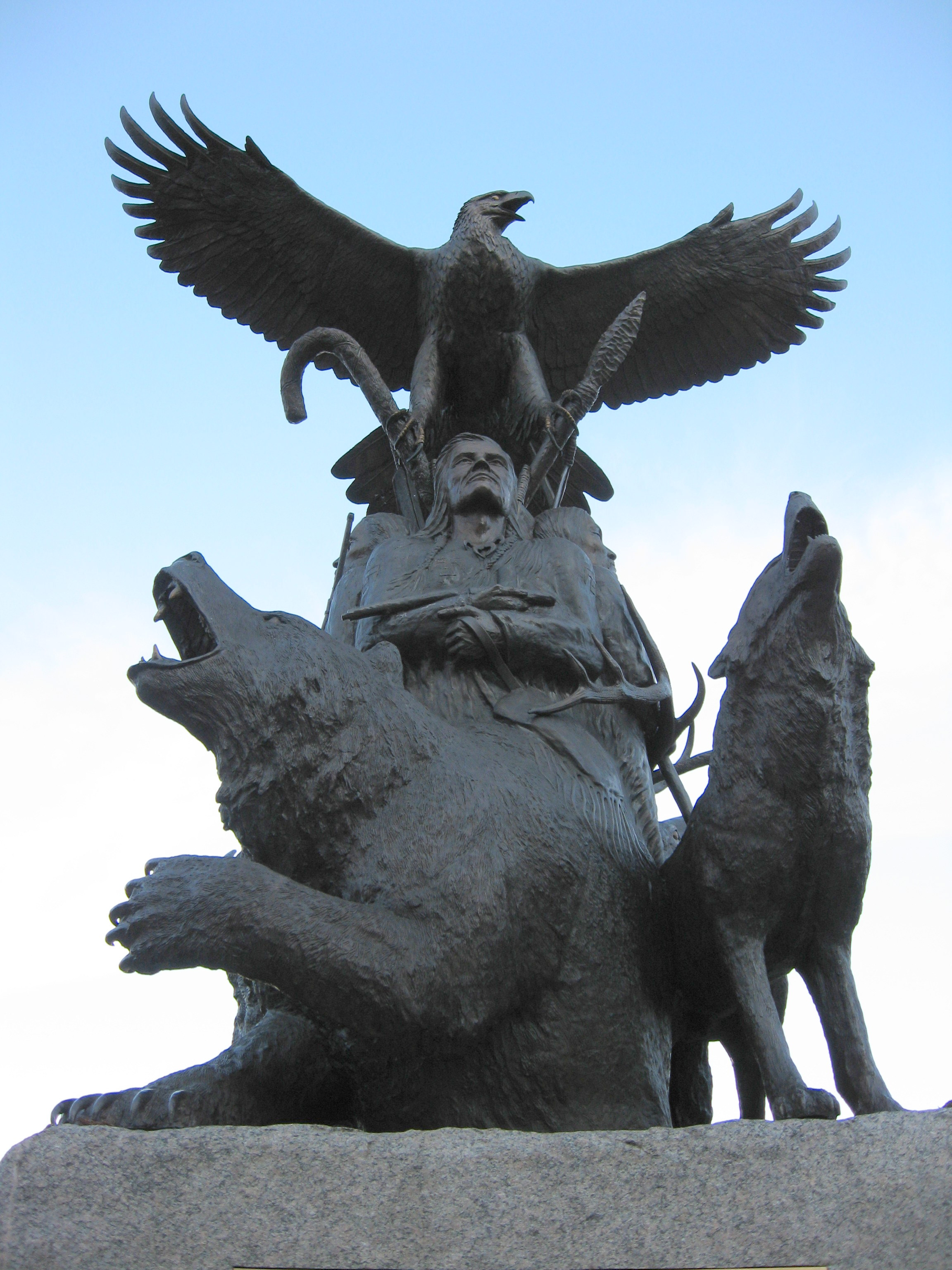
Monument to aboriginal War veterans in the park

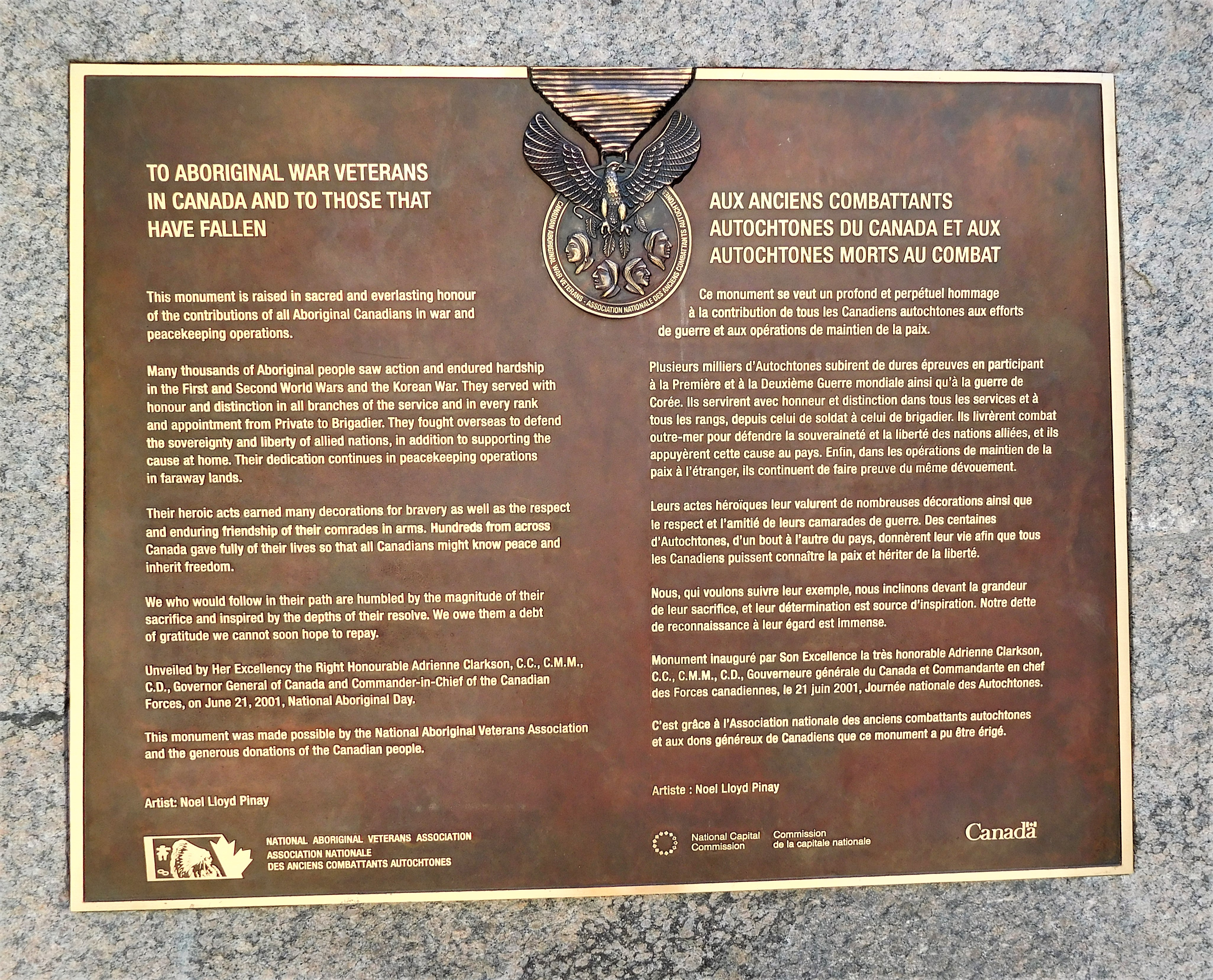
National Aboriginal Veterans Monument plaque

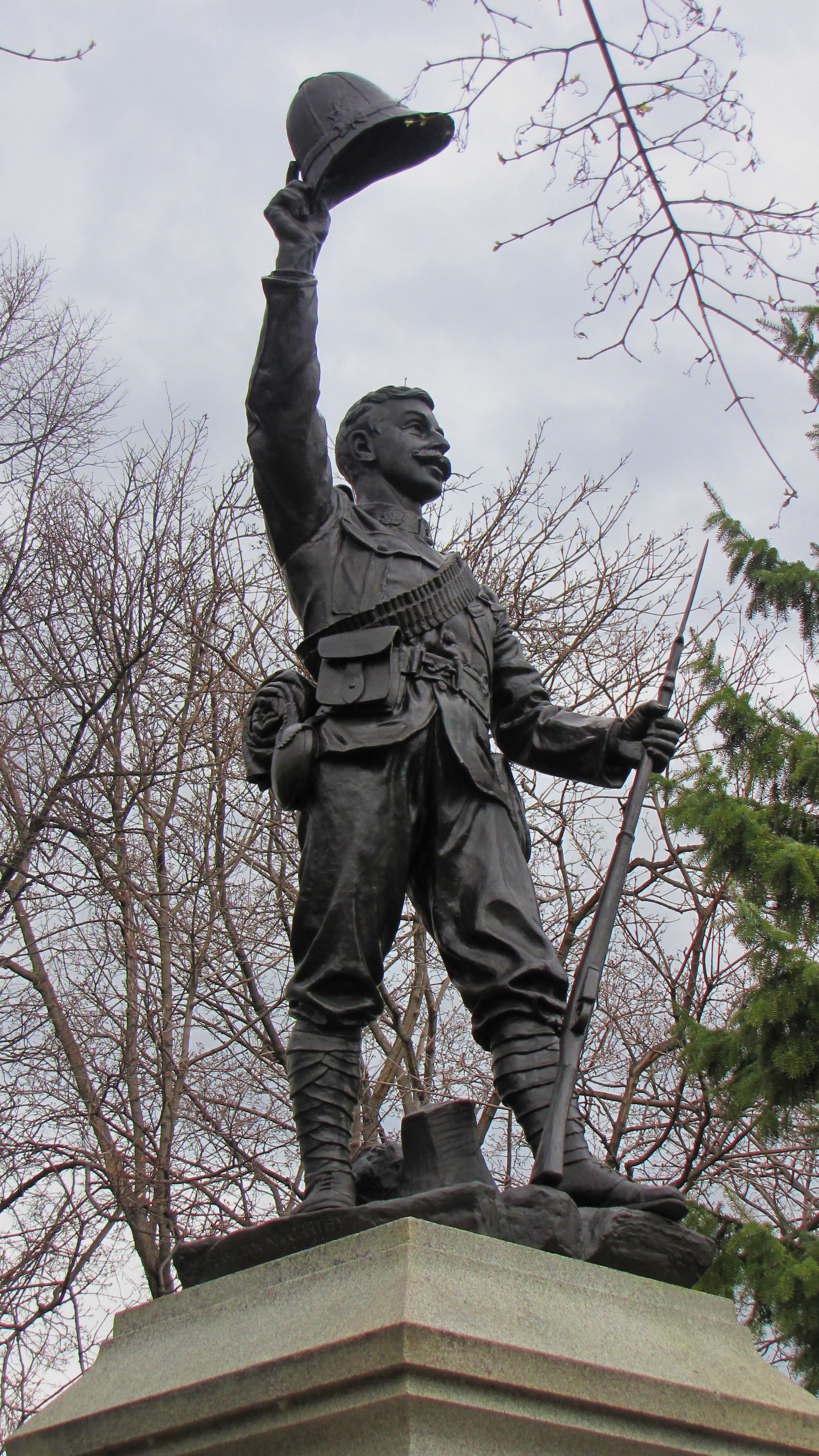
Statue to dead soldiers of the Boer War

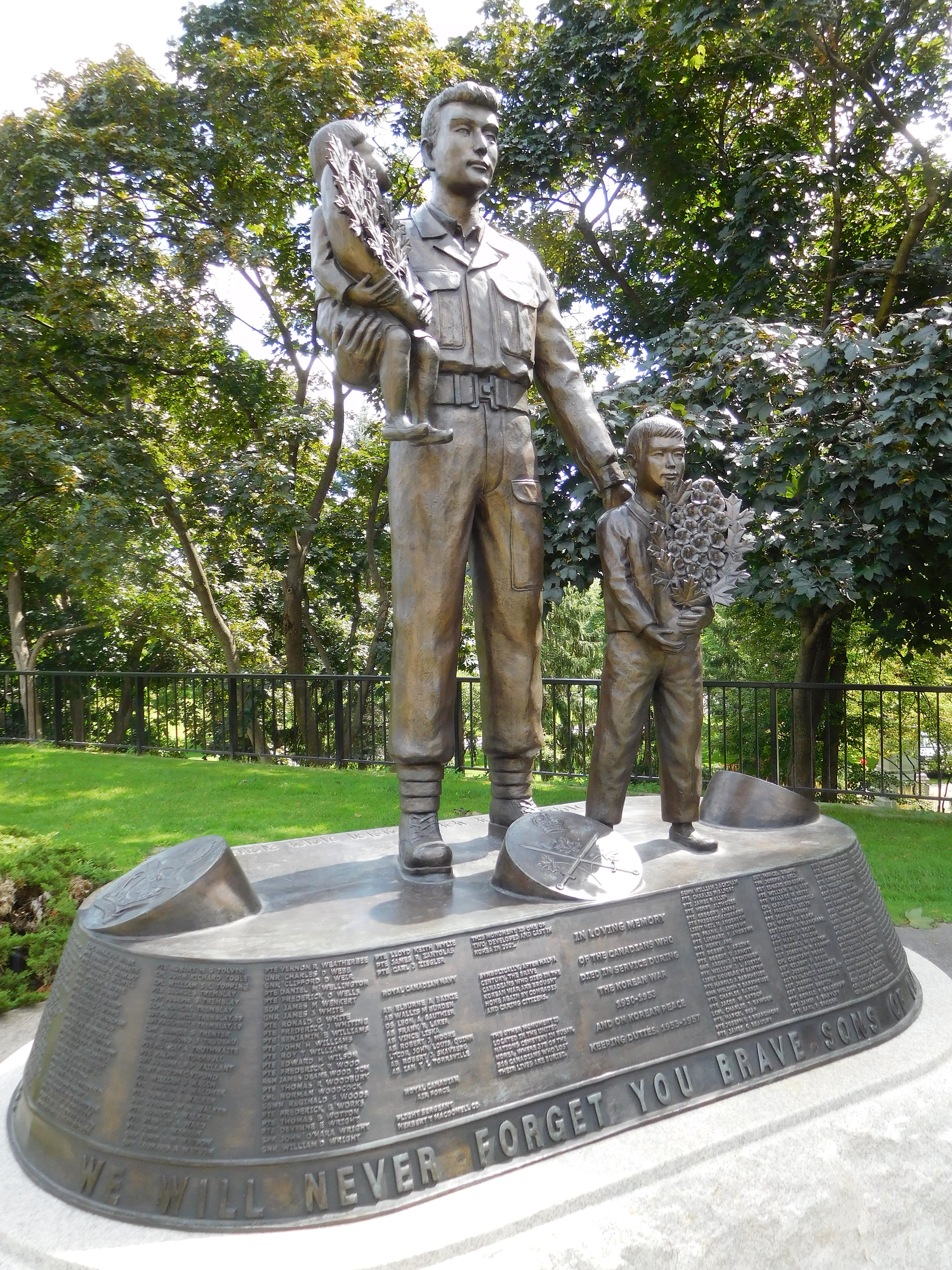
Monument to Canadian Fallen

The park is also home to the Canadian Animals in War Memorial. On November 3, 2012, the dedication to Animals in War memorial took place at Confederation Park in Ottawa. The memorial consists of three plaques and sculpture of a dog located next to the South African War Memorial. The memorial was overseen by Lloyd Swick, assisted by Shalindhi Perera and Laureen Harper as honorary patron. The bronze memorial is created by David Clendining.

A large plaque, erected in 1964 by the Polish Home Army Ex-Servicemen's Association of Canada, is dedicated to the memory of Canadian airmen who flew with the Polish Home Army while flying support missions during World War II. In 1993 when the airmen were posthumously awarded a Polish decoration, a bronze replica of the Polish Home Army Cross and a small plaque with inscription were added.

The park is surrounded on all sides by large buildings. On the east, on the other side of the Canal, is the Brutalist office tower of National Defense Headquarters. On the south, across Laurier Avenue is the complex of Ottawa City Hall and the Ottawa Courthouse. On the west, on Elgin, is the large Lord Elgin Hotel. To the north, the National Arts Centre complex can be seen.

The pathways through the park serve as a common shortcut for pedestrians heading from Elgin Street and/or Centretown to destinations to the north and east (the National Arts Centre, Rideau Street, Sussex Drive, the Rideau Centre and/or the Byward Market), since it is a more direct route than walking uphill on Elgin and Wellington Streets.

== History ==
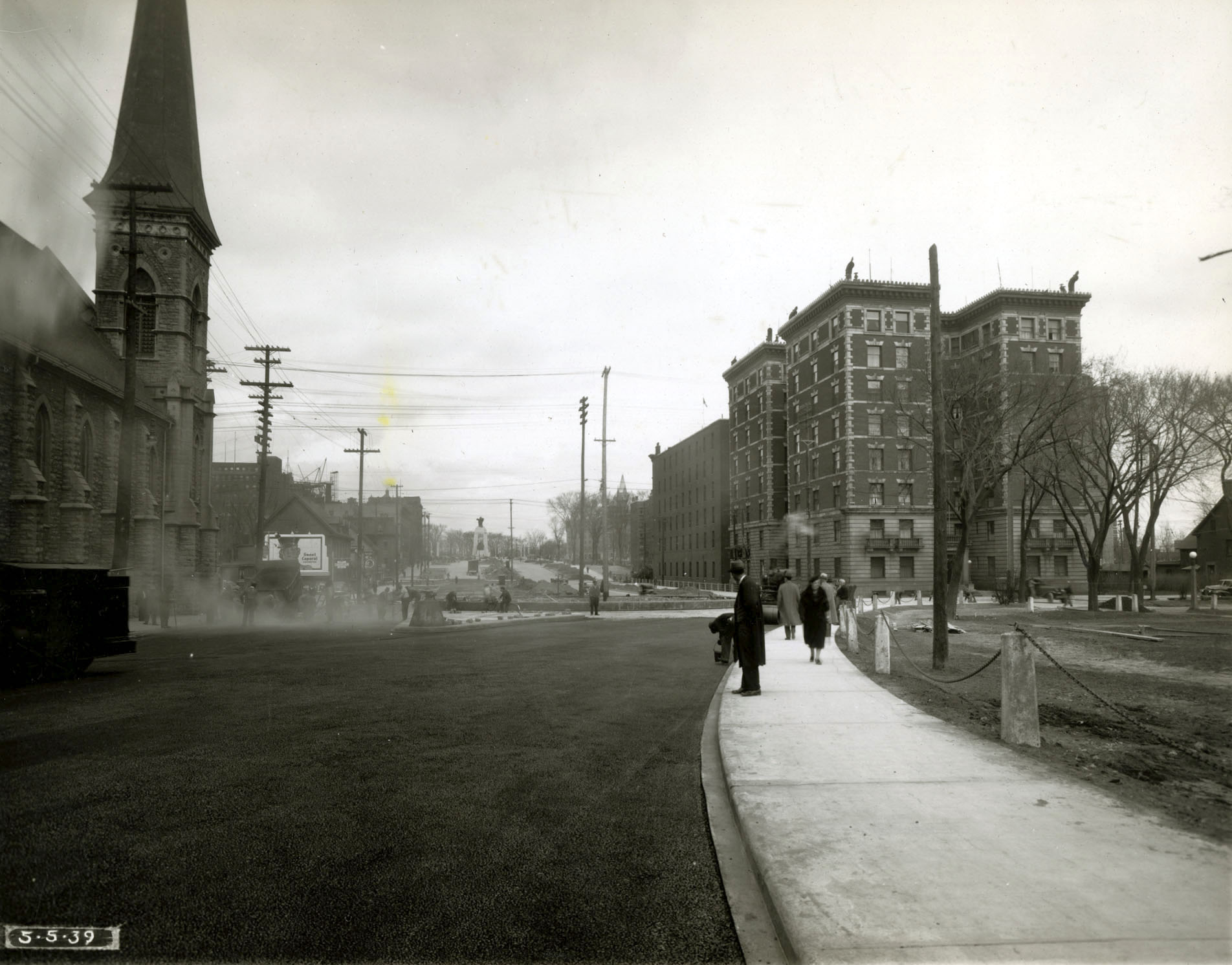
Intersection of Elgin Street and Laurier Avenue, photographed in May,1939. The Roxborough Apartments which were demolished to make way for Confederation Park are visible on the right of the photograph.

The area was part of Ottawa's downtown for many years, the site of businesses related to the nearby Rideau Canal, such as Dey's Boat Works. The location was the site of The Arena from 1908 to 1927, where the original Ottawa Senators ice hockey team played. The land bordering the canal was cleared in 1927, including the demolition of the arena. The land was used to build "The Driveway" roadway along the canal, as a scenic improvement of the capital.

Along Elgin Street, the location was occupied by the Roxborough Apartments, a luxury apartment complex that had once been home to many Ottawa elites, such as Prime Ministers William Lyon Mackenzie King and Louis St. Laurent. As part of the 1949 Greber Plan, the site was to be cleared for a "Confederation Park" along the Canal from Laurier Avenue to Wellington Street surrounded by public buildings. The apartments and a number of buildings were expropriated and demolished by the federal government to build a "National Museum of Science" in 1965. The area north of the Mackenzie King bridge had already been cleared as part of the building of Confederation Square. That section was ultimately used for the construction of the National Arts Centre. In 1967, the Museum site was converted to parkland, to commemorate the Canadian Centennial (the 100th anniversary of Canadian Confederation).

From 1971 to 1993, the park was home to Ed Zelenak's massive sculpture, "Traffic". The controversial work was a large brown tube of fiberglass that was compared to a large worm or piece of dung; it led to much debate over modern art in Ottawa. It was later relocated to a more obscure location by the National Gallery.

In 2016, the park became a hub for players of the mobile game Pokémon Go.

In 2017, the community advocacy group Bookmark the Core proposed that the southeastern portion of the park could be annexed as a home for the new central branch of the Ottawa Public Library. This prompted Mayor Jim Watson to launch a counter "Save Confederation Park" campaign on Twitter. However, Confederation Park was never considered as a site by the library committee considering the location of a new central branch and any changes to the park would first need to be approved by the NCC.

== Events ==
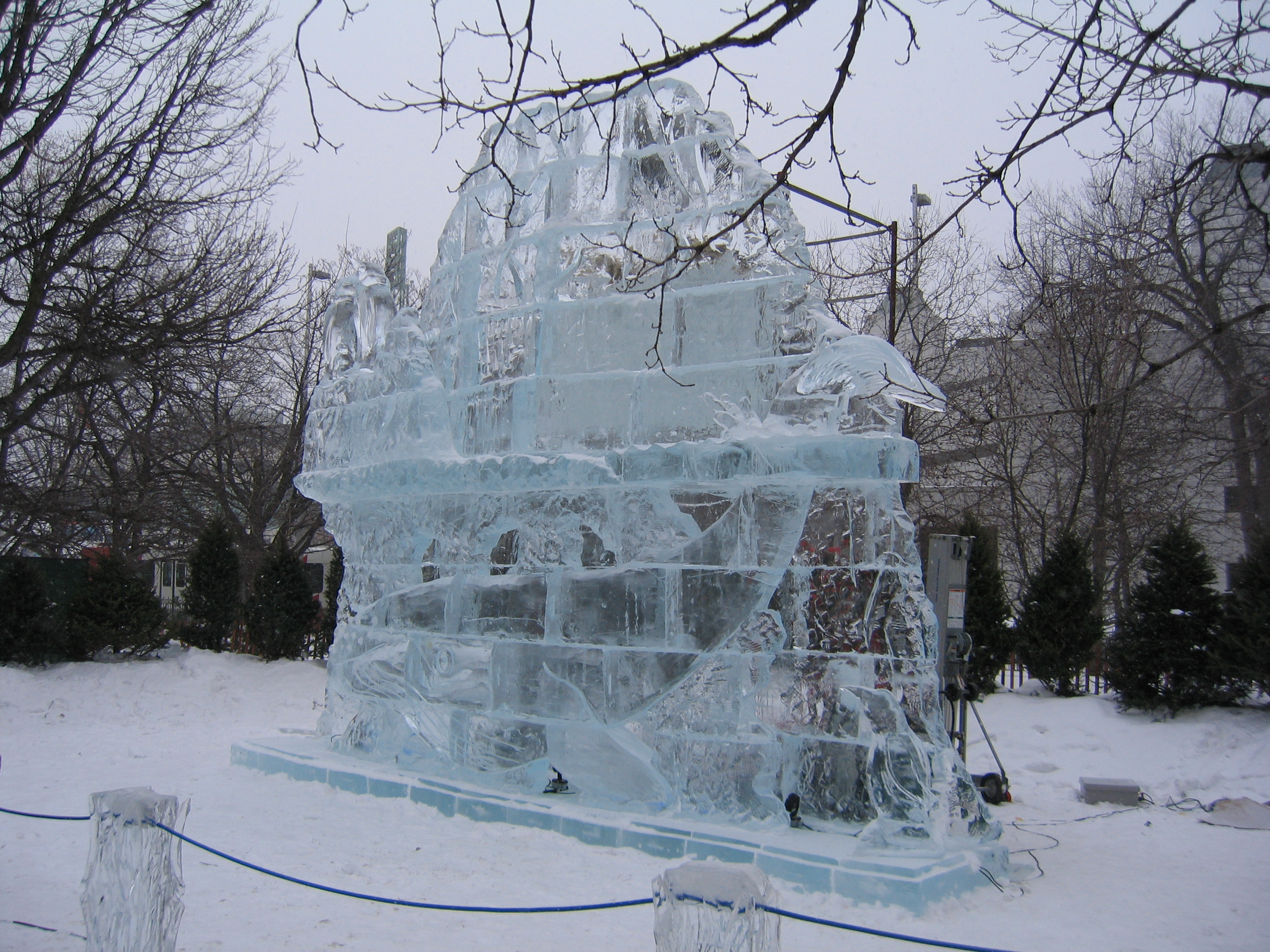
Whale ice sculpture at the 2007 Winterlude

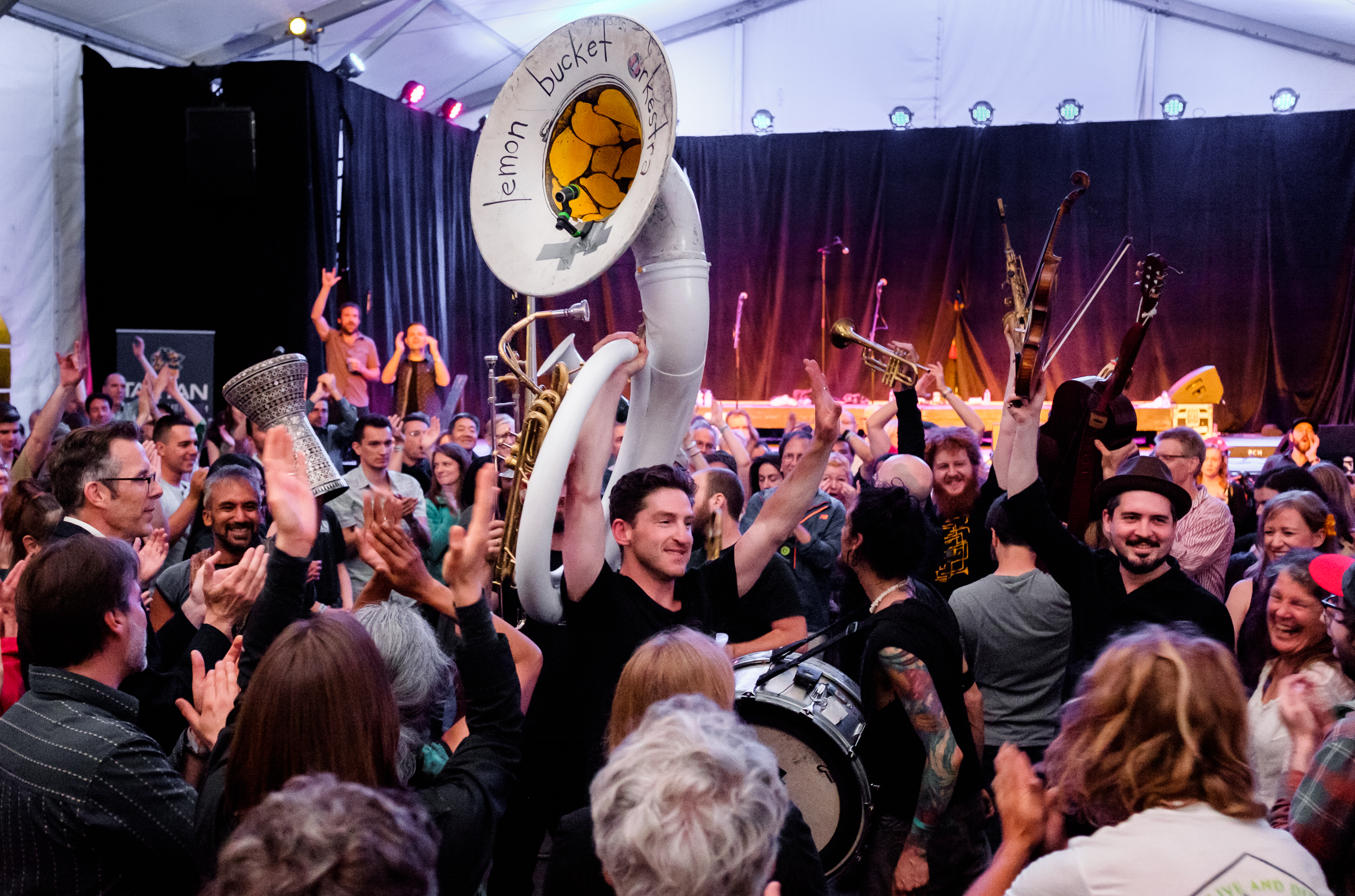
2017 Ottawa International Jazz Festival

In the summer, the Ottawa International Jazz Festival's main events are held. In the winter, Winterlude uses the location for displays, events and its ice sculpture competition. Events of Canada Day are held at the site as well. Other festivals that spill over from the neighbouring Cartier Square plaza in front of Ottawa City Hall use the park.

== Occupy Ottawa ==
The Occupy movement's presence in Ottawa began on Saturday October 15, 2011 with around 500 people participating at Confederation Park. A march on Sussex Drive was held the second day, passing by the U.S. Embassy. Around 75 people camped in tents, with the group planning to occupy the downtown park indefinitely. Many participants, prepared for the long haul, described Occupy Ottawa as a movement of presence, rather than just a protest.

== See also ==
- Garden of the Provinces
