= Atrium on Bay =

Atrium
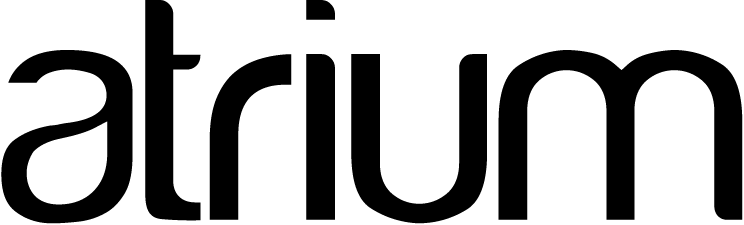

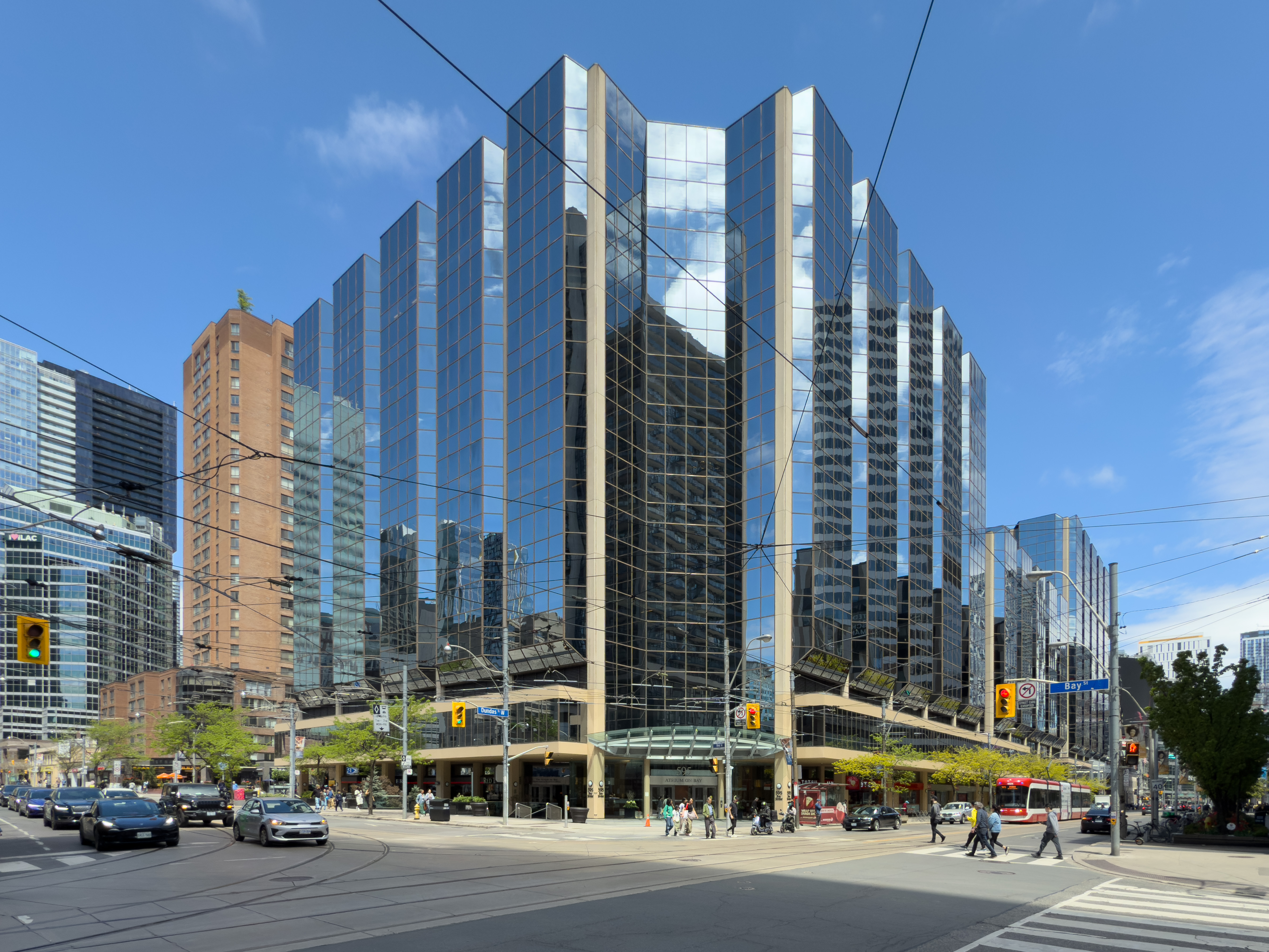
- Interactive map of the Atrium area

General information
- Type: Commercial offices
- Location: Toronto, Ontario, Canada, 595 Bay Street
- Coordinates: 43.656443°N 79.382647°W
- Construction started: 1979
- Completed: 1981
- Owner: H&R REIT
- Operator: H&R REIT

Height
- Roof: 48 m (157 ft)

Technical details
- Floor count: above ground: 14 below ground: 3
- Floor area: 913,000 sq ft (84,800 m^{2})
- Lifts/elevators: 20

Design and construction
- Architect: Page & Steele Architects
- Developer: Twigg Holdings Ltd. Trizec Properties
- Structural engineer: Jablonsky, Ast and Partners

Atrium (formally known as "Atrium on Bay") is a large 1,000,000-square-foot (93,000 m^{2}) retail and office complex in Toronto, Ontario, Canada. Atrium is located adjacent to Sankofa Square, and was built upon the former site of the former Ford Hotel Toronto, on the north side of Dundas Street West, extending from Yonge Street to Bay Street. The mixed-use building was constructed in 1981 with parking on the second and third underground levels and retail space street and concourse levels topped by an eight-storey office block that rises to 14 floors on the east end of the site and 13 on the west. As part of downtown Toronto's PATH network, Atrium's Concourse Level is directly connected underground to the TMU subway station, the Toronto Eaton Centre south, across on Dundas Street. A now-closed underground tunnel connects the Atrium to the former Toronto Coach Terminal located west, across Bay Street.

In 2011, H&R Real Estate Investment Trust purchased the property from Hines Interests Limited Partnership who acquired it in 2007 from a joint venture of Brookfield Properties and The Ellman Companies. In January 2014, H&R received a zoning variance from the Toronto City Council which would allow it to add five floors to each of the office towers, expand the ground level to enclose areas now filled by a covered arcade, planters and seating areas and create additional retail space and to redesign a media tower at the southwest corner of the structure.

The Atrium houses the first Canadian location of Muji, as well as Long Tall Sally, Canada Post, Red Lobster and Rexall among other shops. The building features a variety of sit-down restaurants and a food court on the Concourse Level.

Major office tenants include the Canadian Imperial Bank of Commerce, and various arms of the Government of Ontario, including the Land Registry Office, and the Lottery Prize Claiming Centre for the Ontario Lottery and Gaming Corporation, located on ground level.

Atrium was filmed and used as a set for scenes in a shopping mall in the Canadian drama Flashpoint on the CTV Television Network. The interior was also used in the 1983 PBS TV movie Overdrawn at the Memory Bank.

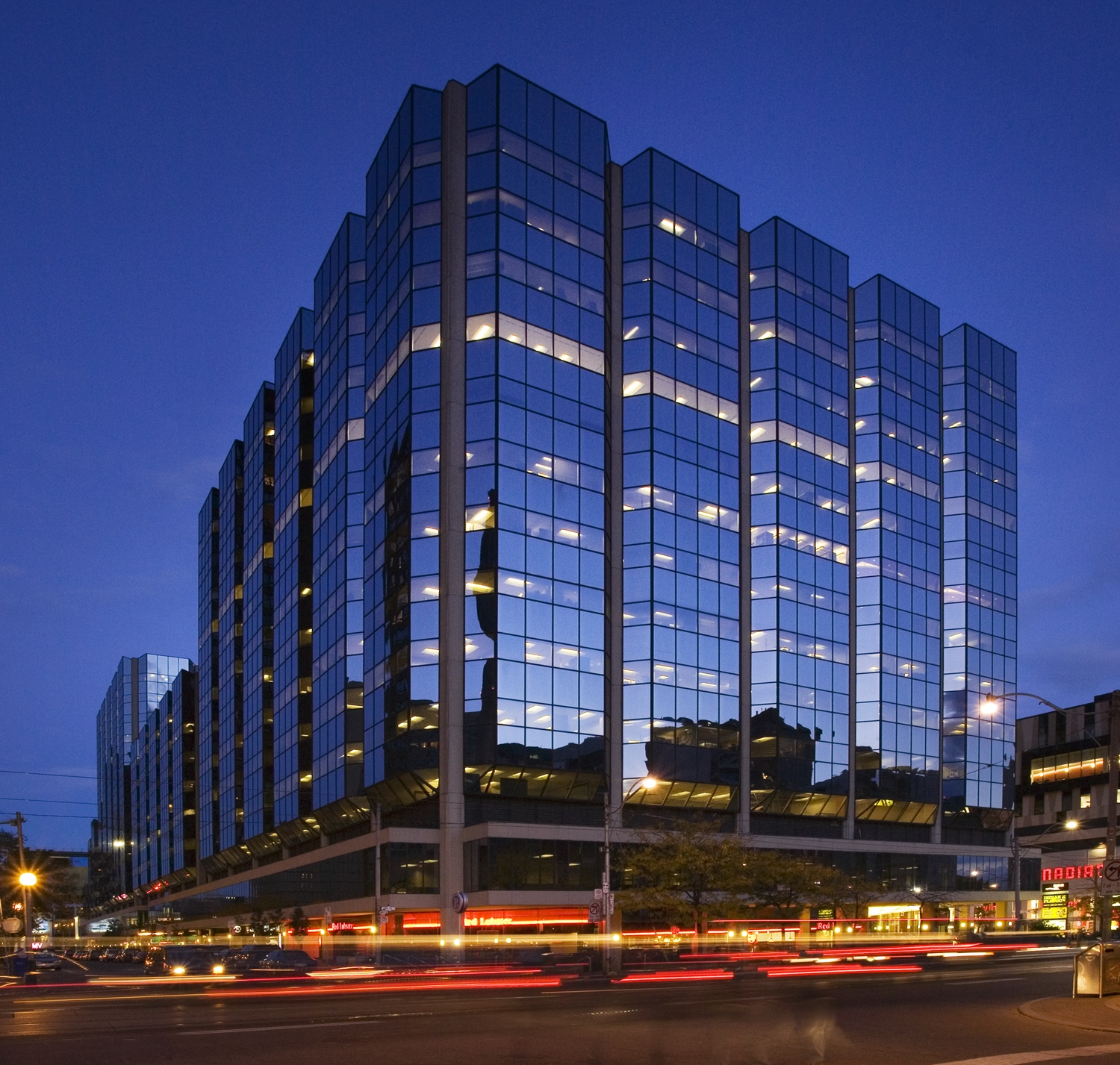
Southeast view to the Edward and Bay Street façades

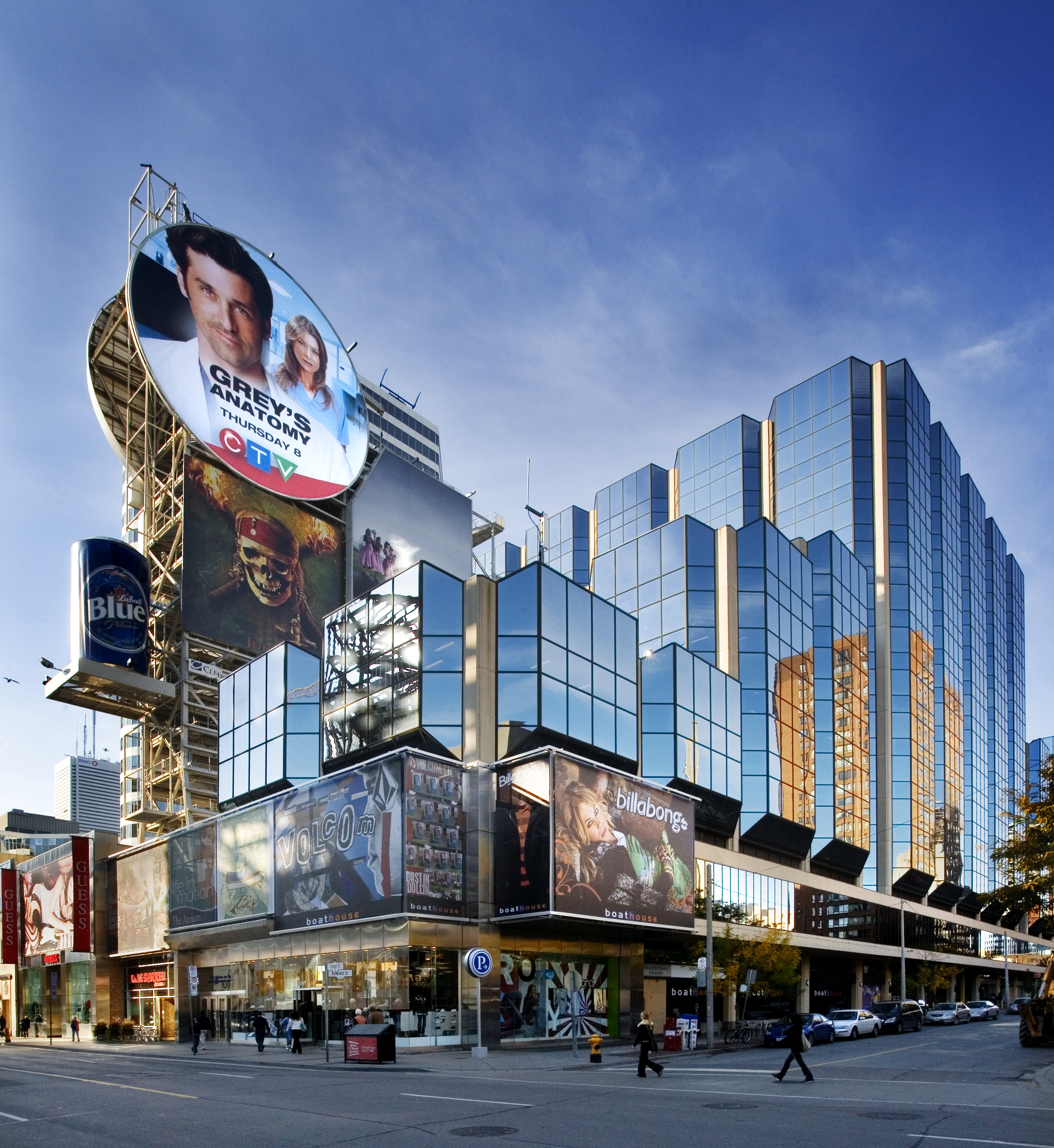
Looking southwest across Yonge Street

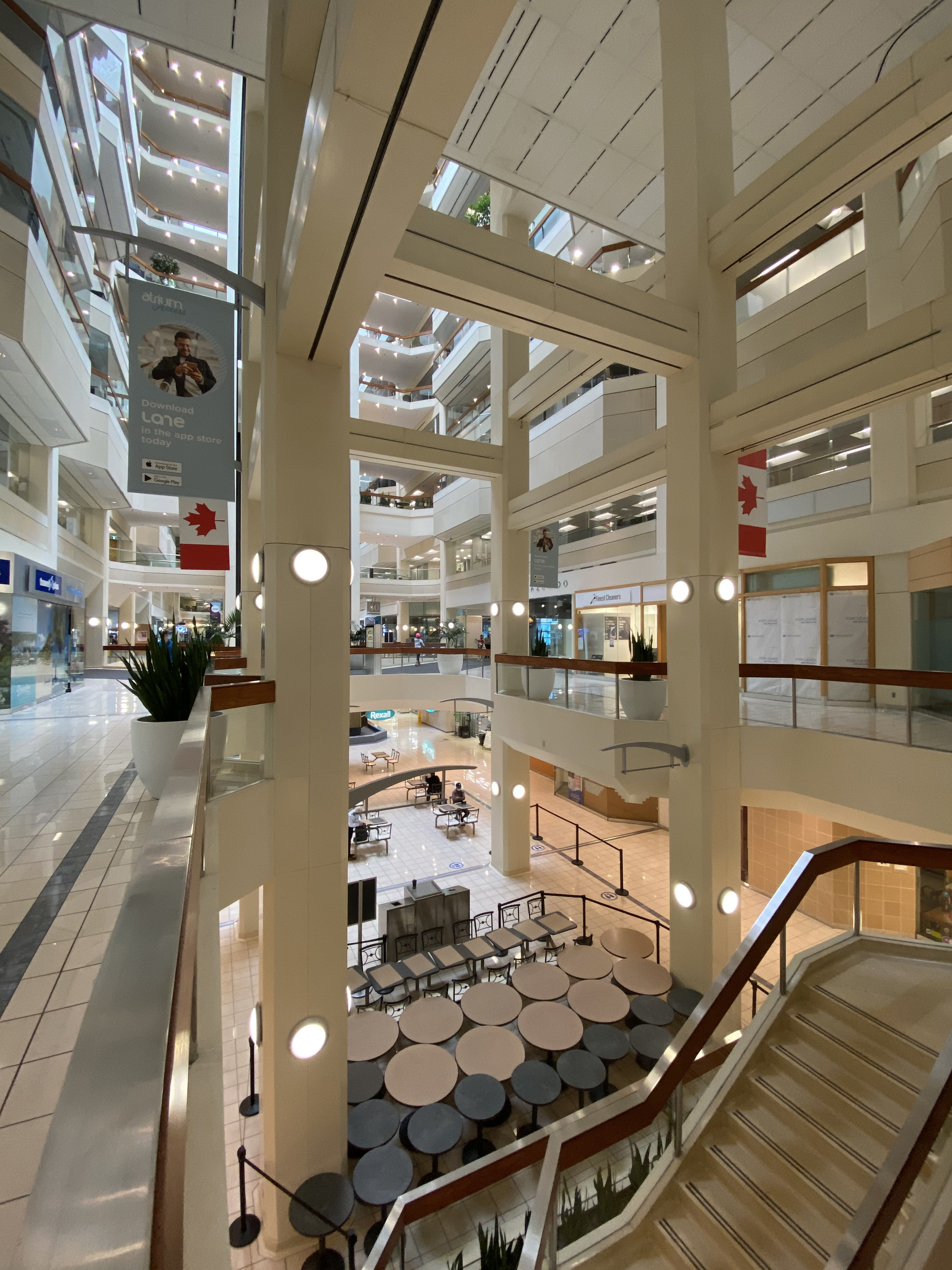
Interior of the atrium
