= National Aboriginal Veterans Monument =

War monument in Ottawa, Ontario, Canada

- National Aboriginal Veterans Association
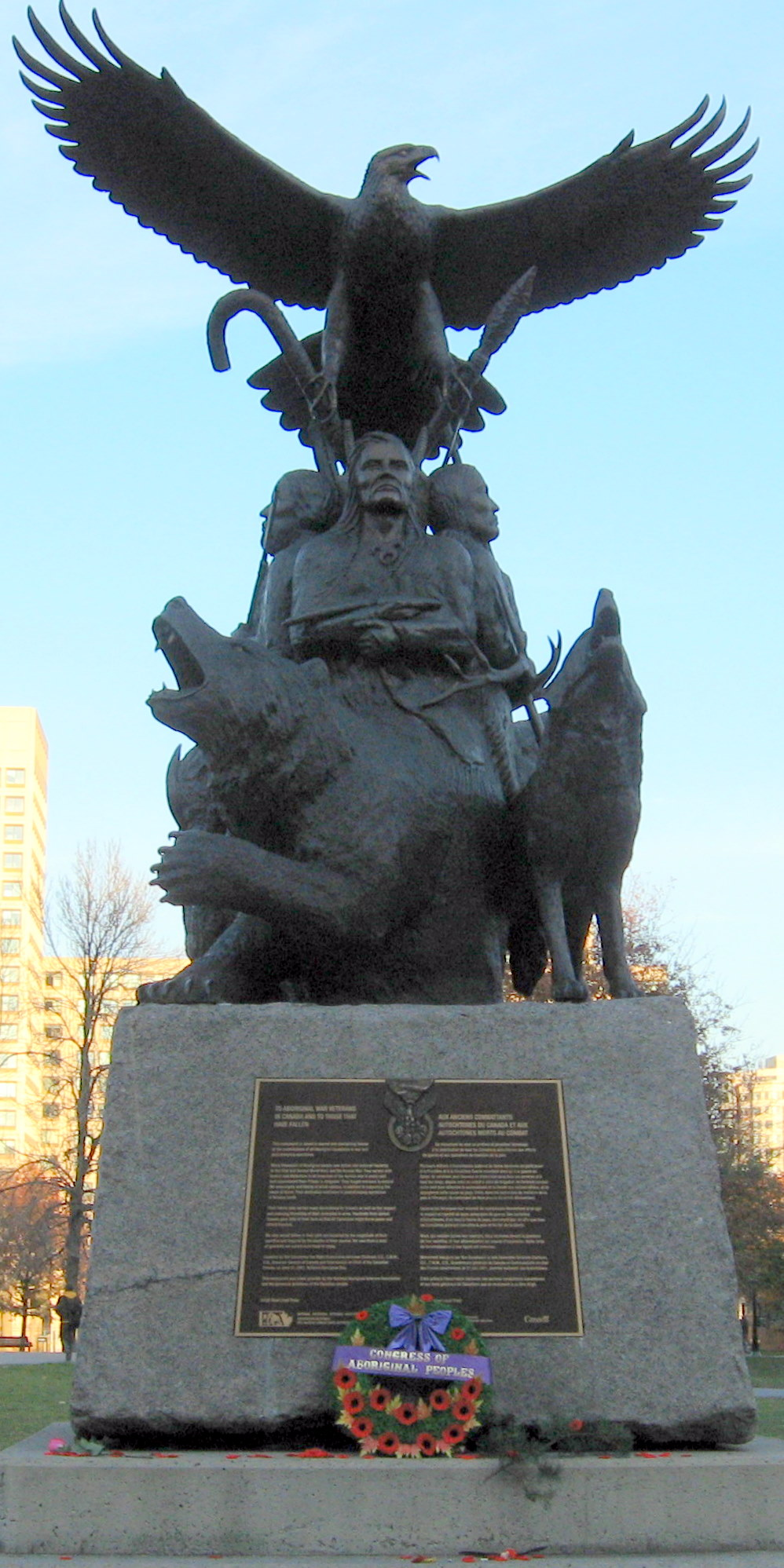
- National Aboriginal Veterans Monument
- For Aboriginal peoples (First Nations, Inuit and Métis) who served with the Canadian forces during armed conflicts
- Unveiled: June 21, 2001
- Location: 45°25′18.04″N 075°41′34.66″W near Ottawa, Ontario, Canada
- Designed by: Lloyd Pinay
- Commemorated: Up to 12,000

The National Aboriginal Veterans Monument is a war monument in Ottawa, Ontario, Canada that commemorates the contributions of all Aboriginal peoples in war and peacekeeping operations from World War I to the present. The monument was designed by Lloyd Pinay, of the Peepeekisis First Nation in Saskatchewan, whose father took part in the D-Day assault in World War II. It was unveiled in Confederation Park by Adrienne Clarkson, then Governor General of Canada, on National Aboriginal Day, June 21, 2001.

== Creation ==
The bronze monument sits atop a marble base, which was quarried in Shawinigan, Quebec. The monument itself was created in its entirety during 2000 and 2001 on the Muskeg Lake Cree Nation Urban Reserve in Saskatoon, Saskatchewan, part of Treaty Six Territory. Once completed, it was then disassembled for transport and then reassembled again in Ottawa.

== Symbolism ==
The sculptor, Lloyd Pinay, has said that "the major theme was that the reason for war is in all likelihood a desire for peace". The monument depicts a golden eagle as the messenger between the Creator and man. The eagle or Thunderbird also symbolizes the Creator and embodies the spirit of the Aboriginal people. Below the eagle are four human figures, facing the four points of the compass and representing First Nations, Inuit and Métis. Pinay felt it was very important to incorporate female figures in the sculpture to acknowledge the role of women not only as nurses, but as those responsible for maintaining families while the men were away. The human figures hold not only weapons but also spiritual objects: an eagle feather fan and a peace pipe. There are four animal figures, one on each corner to act as spirit guides, each with a special attribute: a wolf (family values), a buffalo (tenacity), an elk (waryness) and a bear (healing powers).

== See also ==
- Military history of the Mi’kmaq people
- Military history of the Maliseet people
