= Steven Johnston =

Steven Johnston is the Neal A. Maxwell Chair in Political Theory, Public Policy, and Public Service in the Department of Political Science at the University of Utah. He was appointed to the position in 2012. From 1994 to 2011, Johnston taught in the Department of Government and International Affairs at the University of South Florida. In 2013, Johnston founded the Neal A. Maxwell Lecture Series in Political Theory and Contemporary Politics. Johnston is a regular contributor to The Contemporary Condition.

== Education ==
Johnston received his Ph.D. and M.A. degrees from The Johns Hopkins University in Baltimore, Maryland, and his undergraduate degree from the University of Southern California in Los Angeles, California.

== Research ==
Johnston's third book was entitled American Dionysia: Violence, Tragedy, and Democratic Politics, published by Cambridge University Press in 2015. In 2007 Johnston published The Truth about Patriotism (Duke University Press). Johnston's first book, Encountering Tragedy: Rousseau and the Project of Democratic Order, was published by Cornell University Press in 1999. His 2018 book Lincoln: Icon of Ambiguity, was published in Rowman & Littlefield's Modernity and Political Thought series, edited by Kennan Ferguson and Morton Schoolman.

== Selected bibliography ==
Books

- Lincoln: The Ambiguous Icon, Rowman and Littlefield, Modernity and Political Thought series, 2018
- American Dionysia: Violence, Tragedy, and Democratic Politics, Cambridge University Press, 2015
- The Truth about Patriotism, Duke University Press, 2007
- Encountering Tragedy: Rousseau and the Project of Democratic Order, Cornell University Press, 1999

Articles

- "Two Cheers for Ferguson's Democratic Citizens," Theory & Event, 17:3, 2014, Supplement (Ferguson)
- "Patriotism," Encyclopedia of Political Thought, Wiley-Blackwell, 2014
- "Rousseau," Encyclopedia of Political Thought, Wiley-Blackwell, 2014
- "Animals in War: Commemoration, Patriotism, Death," Political Research Quarterly, 65:2, June 2012
- "American Dionysia," Contemporary Political Theory, 8:3, August 2009
- "The Architecture of Democratic Monuments," Strategies, 15:2, November 2002
- "This Patriotism Which Is Not One," Polity, 34:3, Spring 2002
- "Political Not Patriotic: Democracy, Civic Space, and the American Memorial/Monument Complex," Theory & Event, 5.2, 2001
