= Animals in War Memorial =

War memorial in London, England

- Westminster City Council
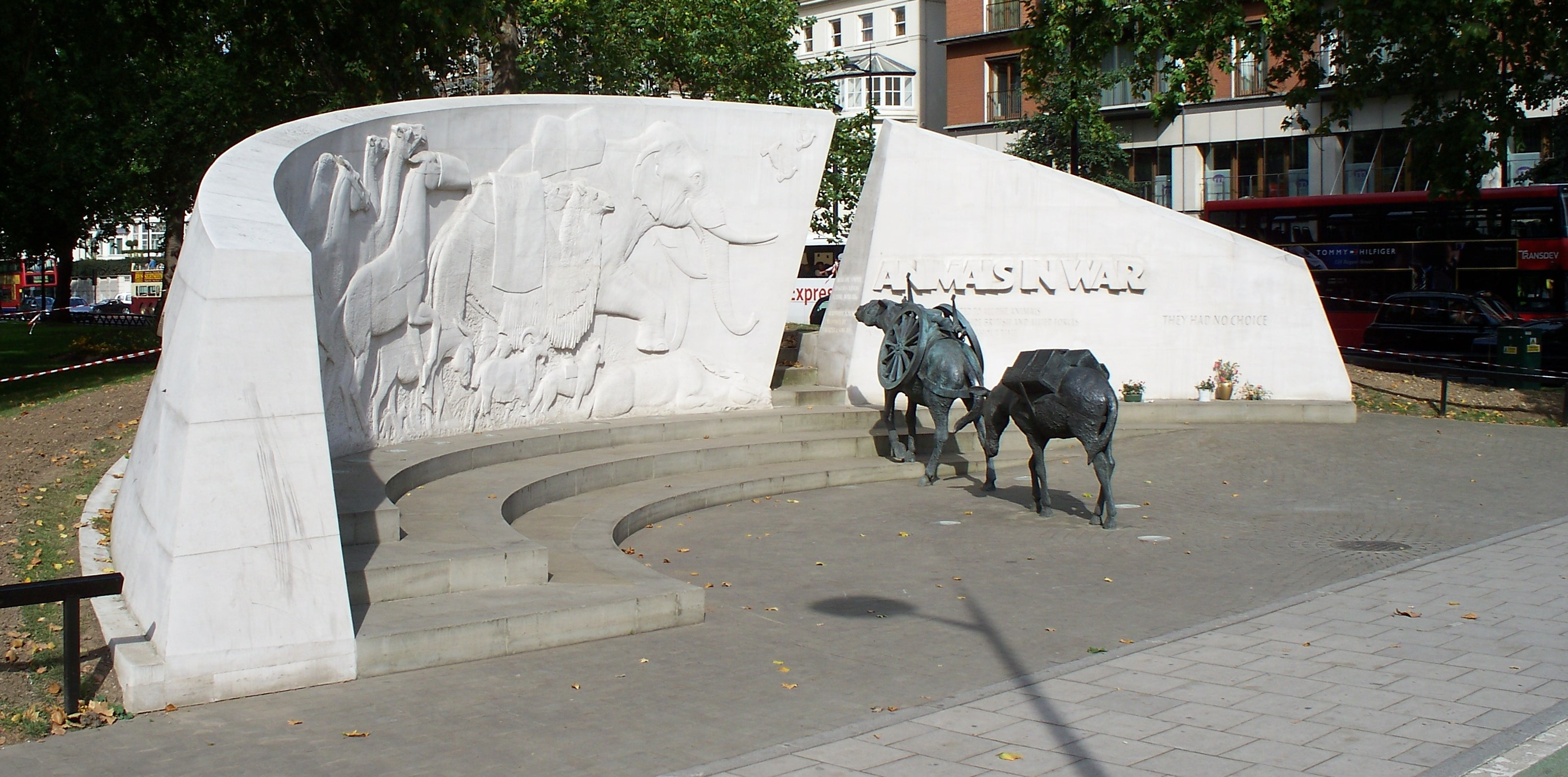
- For All the animals that served and died alongside British and allied forces in wars and campaigns throughout time
- Unveiled: 24 December 2004; 21 years ago
- Location: 51°30′40″N 0°09′26″W; Hyde Park; London, W1
- Designed by: David Backhouse
- Website: www.animalsinwar.org.uk
- They had no choice

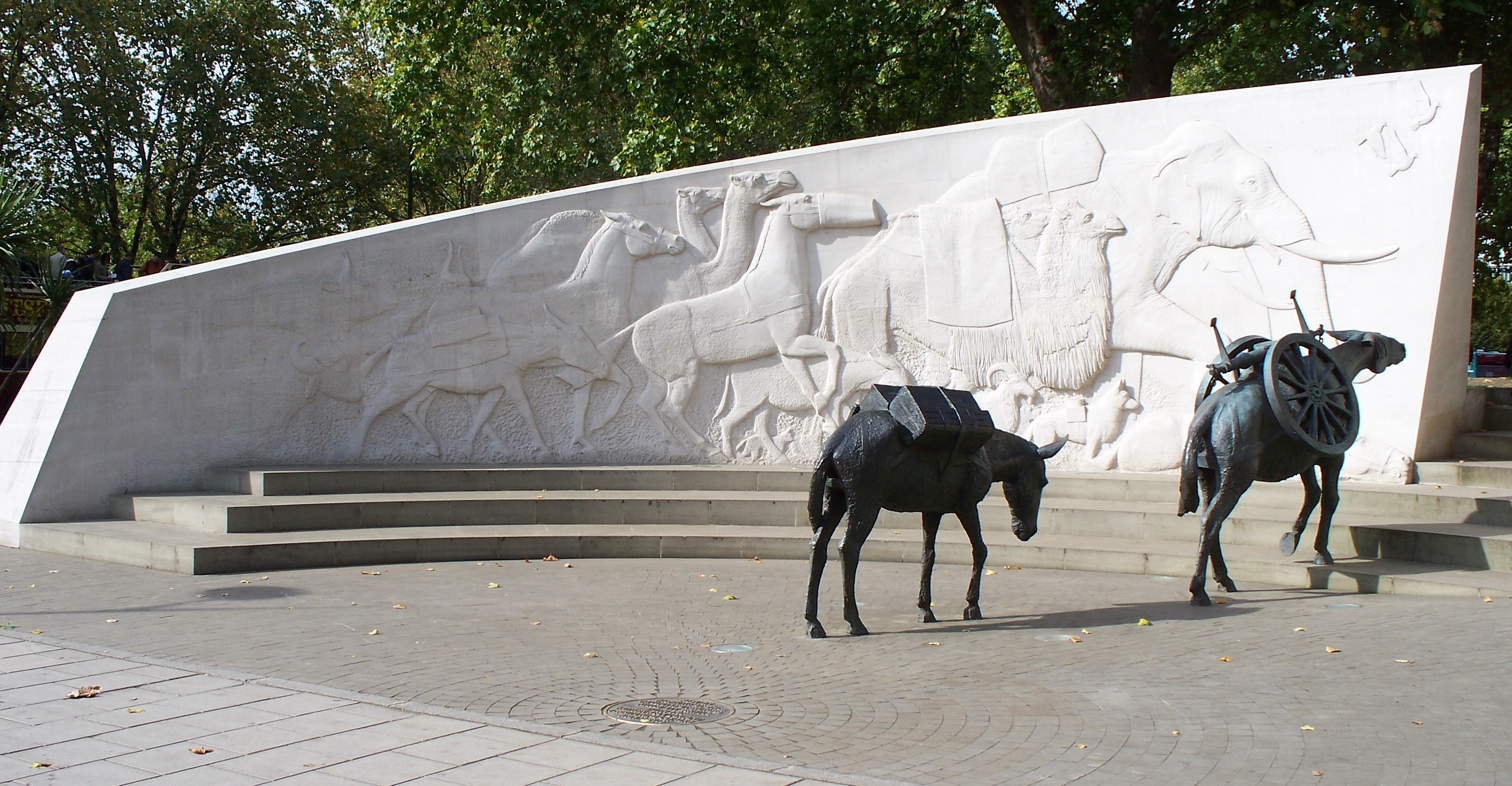
Western section of the memorial

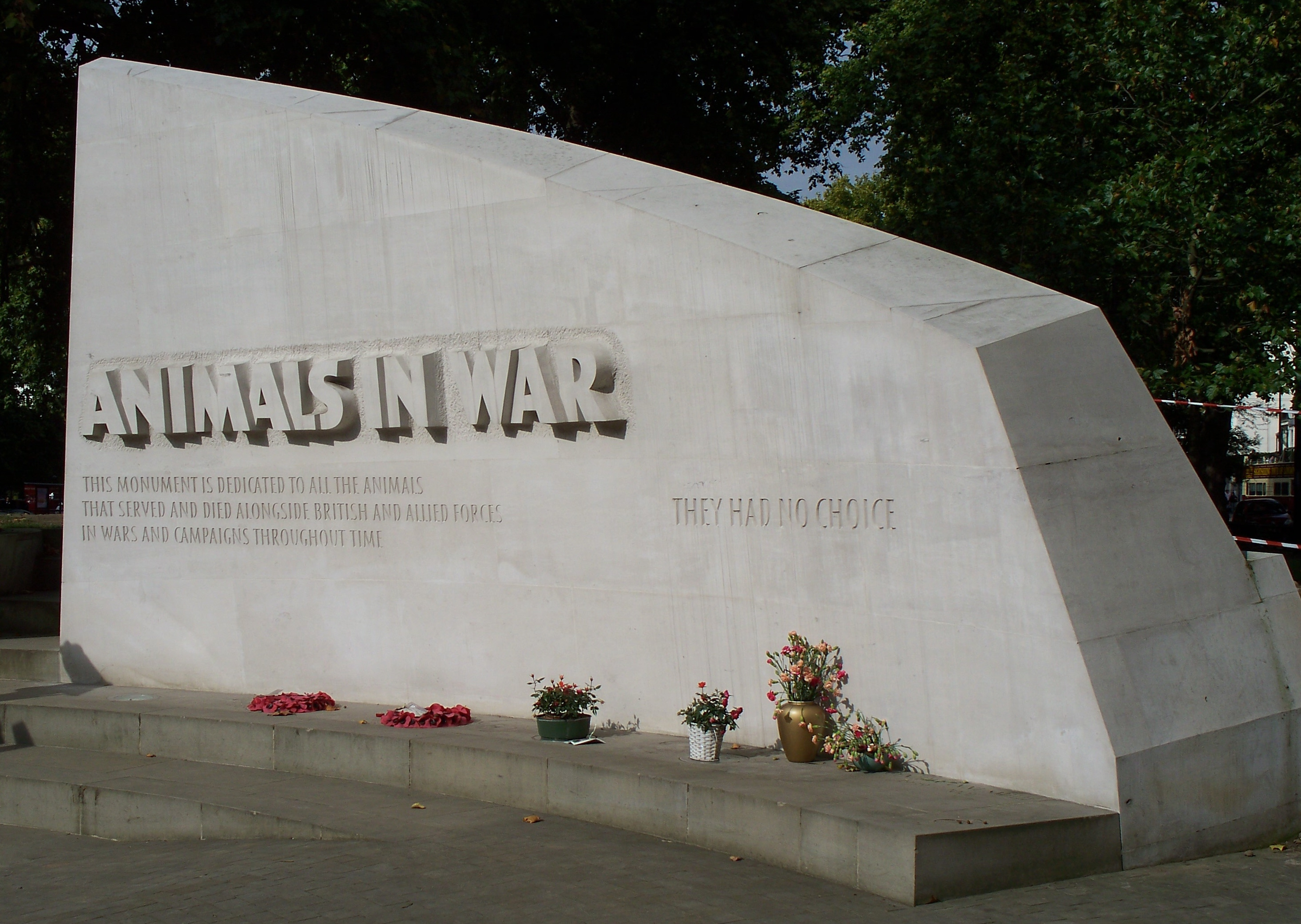
Eastern section of the memorial

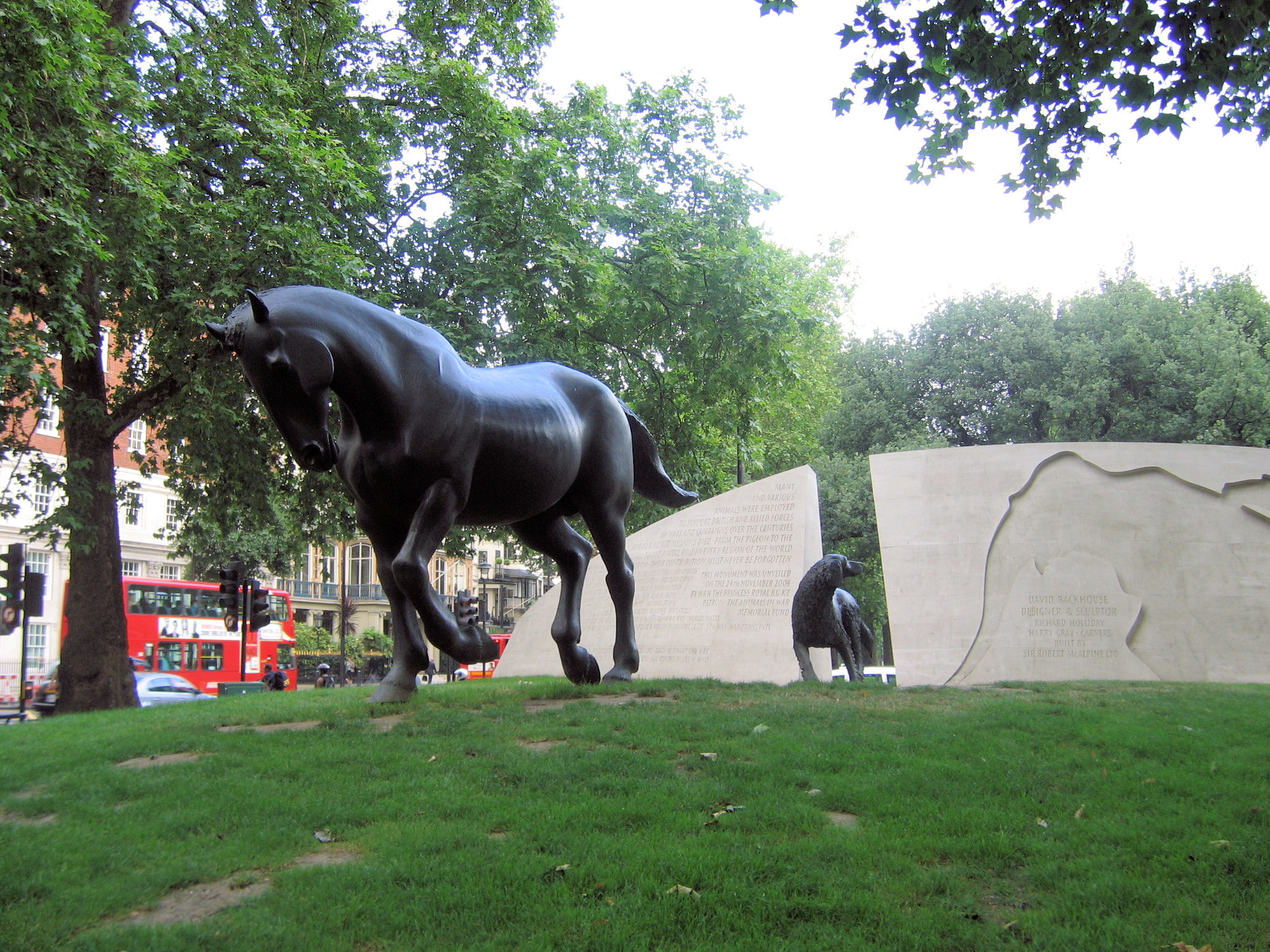
Northern section of the memorial

The Animals in War Memorial is a war memorial, in Hyde Park, London, commemorating the countless animals that have served and died under British military command throughout history. It was designed by English sculptor David Backhouse and unveiled in November 2004 by Anne, Princess Royal.

== History ==
The memorial was inspired by Jilly Cooper's 1983 book Animals in War, and was made possible by a specially created fund of £1.4 million from public donations of which Cooper was a co-trustee. The memorial consists of a 55 ft by 58 ft (16.8 m by 17.7 m) curved Portland stone wall: the symbolic arena of war, emblazoned with images of various struggling animals, along with two heavily laden bronze mules progressing up the stairs of the monument, and a bronze horse and bronze dog beyond it looking into the distance.

Located on Park Lane, at the junction with Upper Brook Street, on the eastern edge of the park, The Animals in War Memorial was officially opened on 24 November 2004 by Anne, Princess Royal.

In May 2013 it was one of two London war memorials vandalised on the same night. The word "Islam" was spray-painted on it causing £2,766 in damage, and the nearby RAF Bomber Command Memorial suffered £6,500 in damage. A 31-year-old man later admitted to vandalising the memorials and was charged for a total of 94 vandalism and destruction of property offences carried out over several weeks against homes, cars, memorials and a church, causing over £50,000 in damage. Pleading guilty in May 2014, he was sentenced to be detained and treated in a secure mental health hospital for an unlimited period of time under the Mental Health Act.

== Inscriptions ==
The inscriptions are in various forms and sizes and are all uppercase designed and cut by Andrew Whittle. Other than the featured messages, there are several inscriptions on the rear or outside, and on the inner edges of the wings (in the gap), attributing the creators and funders.

On the face of the right wing when viewed from the front or inside:

Main heading; the largest and heaviest cut inscription

Animals in War

Directly beneath the main heading

This monument is dedicated to all the animals
that served and died alongside British and allied forces
in wars and campaigns throughout time

Beneath and to the right of the main heading

They had no choice

On the face of the left wing when viewed from the rear or outside (on the reverse of the main heading):

Many
and various
animals were employed
to support British and Allied Forces
in wars and campaigns over the centuries
and as a result millions died · From the pigeon to the
elephant they all played a vital role in every region of the world
in the cause of human freedom · Their contribution must never be forgotten

== See also ==
- Dickin Medal – Instituted in 1943 in the United Kingdom by Maria Dickin to honour the work of animals in World War II
- PDSA Gold Medal – Recognised as the animal equivalent of the George Cross; acknowledges the bravery and devotion to duty of animals
- Purple poppy – A symbol of remembrance in the United Kingdom for animals that served during wartime
- Horse Memorial, Port Elizabeth – A monument to the horses that served and died in the Second Boer War, erected in 1905
