= List of bridges in Ottawa =

This is a list of bridges in Ottawa, Ontario, Canada. They are listed from west to east and north to south. Bridges spanning Airport Parkway, O-Train lines 1 and 2, Green's Creek, Highway 174, Highway 416, Highway 417, the Jock River, and the Transitway are not listed.

== Spanning the Ottawa River ==
Bridge	Carries	Length	Built	Coordinates	Image	Remarks
Morris Island Train Bridge	Pedestrian pathway	498 m	1915	45°27′59.26″N 76°17′10.57″W		Originally carried Canadian Northern Railway (1915—1998) and the Ottawa Central Railway (1998—2008). Converted into a pedestrian bridge in 2014. Fitted to accommodate snowmobiles in 2022.
Champlain Bridge	Place Samuel-De Champlain Island Park Drive	1010 m	1928	45°24′35.5″N 75°45′34.7″W		Crosses Bate Island, Cunningham Island, and Riopelle Island. Longest bridge in Ottawa.
Lemieux Island Bridge	Onigam Street	215 m	1919	45°24′50.1″N 75°43′52.23″W	Ottawa, Ontario - Lemieux Island Bridge - 3	Crosses Bell Island.
Chief William Commanda Bridge	Pedestrian pathway	992 m	1880	45°24′46.28″N 75°43′33.76″W		Crosses Lemieux Island. Originally carried the Quebec, Montreal, Ottawa and Occidental Railway (1880—1882) and the Canadian Pacific Railway (1882—2005). Converted into a pedestrian bridge in 2023.
Chaudière Bridge	Chaudière Crossing	99 m	1919	45°25′16″N 75°43′07″W		Site of the first bridge linking Ottawa and Gatineau.
Portage Bridge		700 m	1973	45°25′20″N 75°42′49″W		Crosses Victoria Island.
Alexandra Bridge		563 m	1900	45°25′47.81″N 75°42′13.54″W		Originally carried the Canadian Pacific Railway (1900—1966).
Macdonald-Cartier Bridge	Autoroute 5	618 m	1963	45°26′12″N 75°42′9″W		

== Spanning the Rideau River ==
Bridge	Carries	Length	Built	Coordinates	Image	Remarks
Bytown Bridge (West Bridge)	Sussex Drive	70 m	2005	45°26′21.88″N 75°41′45.51″W		Replaced the original bridge built in 1954.
Bytown Bridge (East Bridge)	Sussex Drive	84 m	2005	45°26′28.23″N 75°41′41.31″W		Replaced the original bridge built in 1954.
Minto Bridge (West Bridge)	Union Street	61 m	1900	45°26′17.68″N 75°41′35.42″W		
Minto Bridge (East Bridge)	Union Street	112 m	1900	45°26′22.93″N 75°41′31.84″W		Crosses Maple Island.
	Island Lodge Road	92 m	1964	45°26′12.52″N 75°40′55.62″W		
Porter Island Bridge	Pedestrian pathway (closed)	78 m	1894	45°26′12.4″N 75°40′50.48″W		
St. Patrick Street Bridge	St. Patrick Street	163 m	1975	45°26′15.03″N 75°40′43.08″W		
Cummings Bridge	Rideau Street	213 m	1921	45°25′59.58″N 75°40′16.59″W	RideauRV	
Adàwe Crossing	Pedestrian pathway	125 m	2015	45°25′34.85″N 75°40′12.51″W		
Provincial Constable J. Robert Maki Bridge	Highway 417	159 m	1955	45°25′1.19″N 75°39′46.48″W		
Rideau River Pedestrian/Cycling Bridge	Pedestrian pathway	160 m	1909	45°24′58.86″N 75°39′46.38″W		Originally carried the Canadian National Railway (1909—1966). Converted into a pedestrian bridge in 1970.
Hurdman Bridge	O-Train Line 1	159 m	1983	45°24′51.18″N 75°40′7.05″W	Hurdman - 23	Originally carried the Transitway.
George McIlraith Bridge	Smyth Road	240 m	1965	45°23′58.69″N 75°40′15.3″W		
Billings Bridge	Bank Street	140 m	1916	45°23′21.41″N 75°40′40.53″W		
George Dunbar Bridge	Bronson Avenue	268 m	1996	45°22′59.79″N 75°41′19.56″W		Replaced the original bridge built in 1955.
Rideau River Bridge	O-Train Line 2	100 m	1914	45°22′55.03″N 75°41′41.81″W		Originally carried the Canadian Pacific Railway (1914—2001).
Heron Road Workers Memorial Bridge	Heron Road	276 m	1967	45°22′33.01″N 75°41′59.54″W		Also spans the Rideau Canal.
Hog's Back Fixed Bridge	Hog's Back Road	69 m	1977	45°22′14.94″N 75°41′47.42″W		
Canadian Northern Ontario Railway Bridge	VIA Rail, Canadian National Railway	138 m	1913	45°20′44.39″N 75°41′52.09″W		Originally carried the Canadian Northern Railway (1913—1923).
Michael J. E. Sheflin Bridge	Hunt Club Road	230 m	1985	45°20′2.86″N 75°41′46.51″W		
Vimy Memorial Bridge	Strandherd Drive	144 m	2014	45°16′11.89″N 75°42′9.34″W		
	Nicolls Island Road	22 m	1903	45°15′1.95″N 75°42′7.08″W		The bridge structure which originally spanned the Rideau Canal was moved to Nicolls Island in 1935.
Long Island Dam	Cecil Rowat Lane	48 m	1920	45°14′56.94″N 75°42′11.52″W		
Bridge Street (West Bridge)	Bridge Street	85 m	1956	45°13′41.57″N 75°41′1.07″W		
Bridge Street (East Bridge)	Bridge Street	108 m	1958	45°13′54.87″N 75°40′47.03″W		
Watson's Mill Dam	Pedestrian pathway	60m	1956	45°13′37.39″N 75°40′56.68″W		Replaced the original dam built in 1856.
	Roger Stevens Drive	174 m	1961	45°9′42.92″N 75°38′2.34″W		
Constable Hiram O'Callaghan Memorial Bridge	Highway 416	290 m	1996	45°4′57.89″N 75°38′17.39″W		
Beckett's Landing Bridge	Merlyn Wilson Road	143 m	1991	45°2′50.73″N 75°40′48.24″W		Replaced the original bridge built in 1937.

== Spanning the Rideau Canal ==
Bridge	Carries	Length	Built	Coordinates	Image	Remarks
Plaza Bridge	Wellington Street Rideau Street Elgin Street	65 m	1912	45°25′28.86″N 75°41′41.33″W		Replaced Sappers Bridge and Dufferin Bridge.
Mackenzie King Bridge		101 m	1951	45°25′24.35″N 75°41′28.63″W		
Laurier Avenue Bridge	Laurier Avenue	91 m	1900	45°25′21.35″N 75°41′21.11″W	Laurier Avenue Bridge	
Corktown Footbridge	Pedestrian pathway	70 m	2006	45°25′13.98″N 75°41′4.42″W		
Highway 417		122 m	1965	45°24′44.43″N 75°41′0.27″W		
Pretoria Bridge	Hawthorne Avenue	58 m	1915	45°24′41.58″N 75°40′59.91″W		
Flora Footbridge	Pedestrian pathway	125 m	2019	45°24′18.46″N 75°40′51.87″W		
Bank Street Bridge	Bank Street	112 m	1912	45°23′46.72″N 75°41′4.42″W		
Bronson Avenue Bridge	Bronson Avenue	88 m	1959	45°23′38.48″N 75°41′45.97″W		
Heron Road Workers Memorial Bridge	Heron Road	276 m	1967	45°22′32.16″N 75°42′7.93″W		Also spans the Rideau River.
Hog's Back Swing Bridge	Hog's Back Road	27 m	1976	45°22′11.26″N 75°41′54.96″W		

== Spanning Patterson Creek (Ottawa) ==
Bridge	Carries	Length	Built	Coordinates	Image	Remarks
O'Connor Street Bridge	O'Connor Street	12 m	1907	45°24′24.48″N 75°41′10.76″W		
Queen Elizabeth Driveway Bridge	Queen Elizabeth Driveway	10 m	c. 1912	45°24′28.92″N 75°40′55.4″W		

== Spanning Nepean Inlet ==
Bridge	Carries	Length	Built	Coordinates	Image	Remarks
Nepean Bay Bridge	Trans Canada Trail	30 m	2005	45°24′49.52″N 75°43′11.32″W		Spans Nepean Bay.
LeBreton Bridge	Kichi Zibi Mikan	66 m	2005	45°24′50.04″N 75°43′9.47″W		Spans Nepean Bay.
Booth Street Bridge	Pedestrian pathway	20 m	1874	45°24′50.93″N 75°42′48.37″W		Spans the Fleet Street Aqueduct. Originally carried Booth Street.
Pooley's Bridge	Pedestrian pathway	35 m	1873	45°24′59.71″N 75°42′38.93″W		Spans the Fleet Street Aqueduct. Oldest bridge in Ottawa.

== See also ==
- List of crossings of the Ottawa River
