= Sir George-Étienne Cartier Parkway =

Scenic parkway in Ottawa, Ontario, Canada

- Sir George-Étienne Cartier Parkway highlighted in red
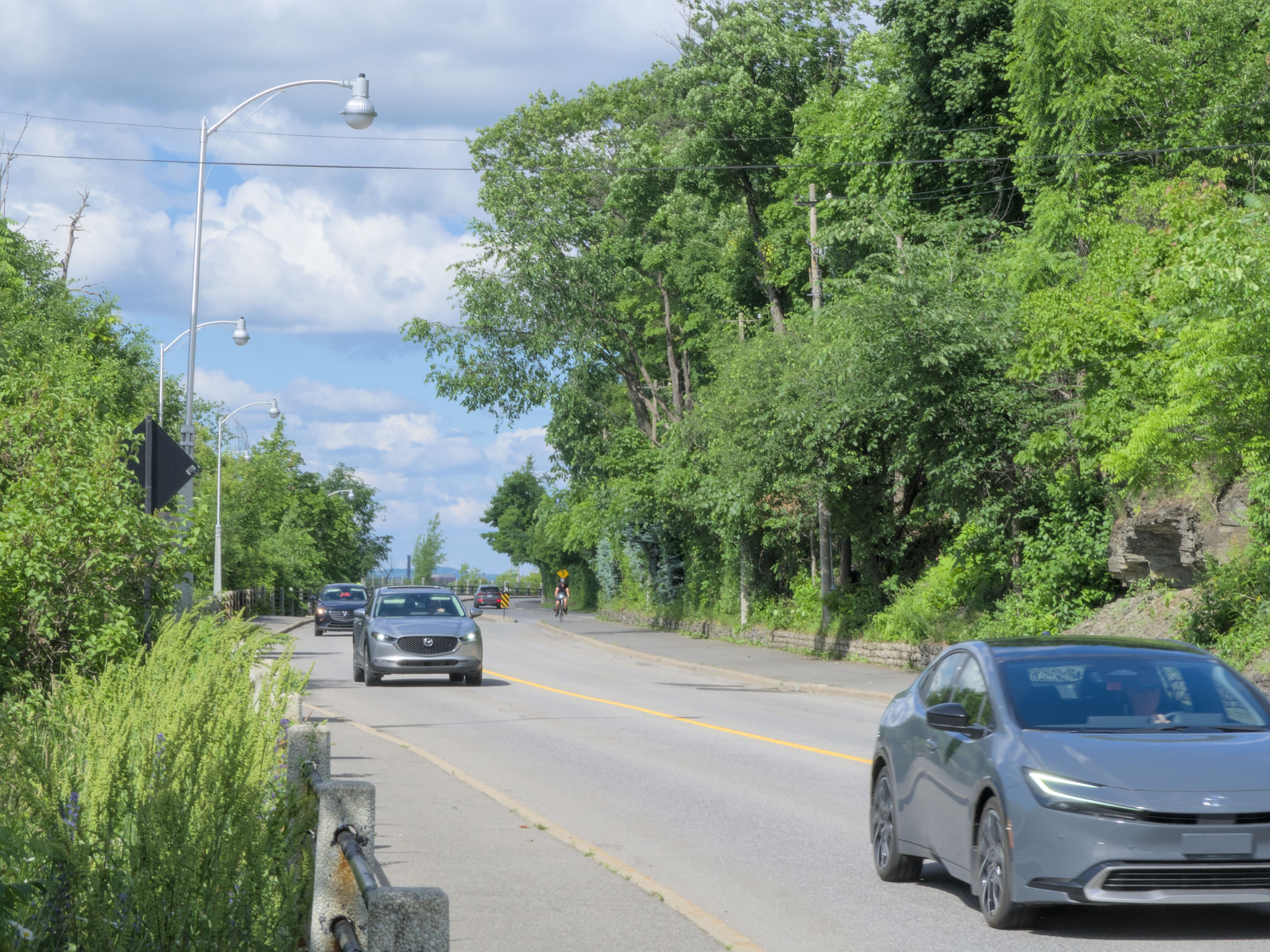
- Looking west below Lornado

Route information
- Maintained by National Capital Commission
- Length: 13.2 km (8.2 mi)

Major junctions
- West end: Sussex Drive
- East end: St. Joseph Boulevard

Location
- Country: Canada
- Province: Ontario
- Major cities: Ottawa

Highway system
- NCC parkways in Ottawa
(in alphabetical order)
← Queen Elizabeth Driveway	Sir George-Étienne Cartier Parkway

The Sir George-Étienne Cartier Parkway (French: Promenade Sir George-Étienne Cartier), formerly known as the Rockcliffe Parkway, is a parkway in Ottawa, Ontario, Canada.

== Route description ==
The parkway begins at the end of Sussex Drive and follows the Ottawa River, through Rockcliffe Park and past the Canada Aviation Museum. About 200 metres after passing Lower Duck Island, it turns towards the south, passing over Regional Road 174. It ends at the intersection between St. Joseph Boulevard and Bearbrook Road.

Being a federal roadway, the parkway is patrolled by the RCMP instead of the Ottawa Police Service. The posted speed limit is 60 kilometres per hour (37 mph) throughout its length.

== History ==
In 2015, the Rockliffe Parkway was renamed to honour one of Canada's Fathers of Confederation, Sir George-Étienne Cartier.

== See also ==
- Rockcliffe Park, Ontario
- Vanier, Ontario
- National Capital Commission
- Aviation Parkway
