= George Dunbar Bridge =

Bridge in Ottawa, Ontario, Canada

Coordinates: 45.38312°N 75.68865°W

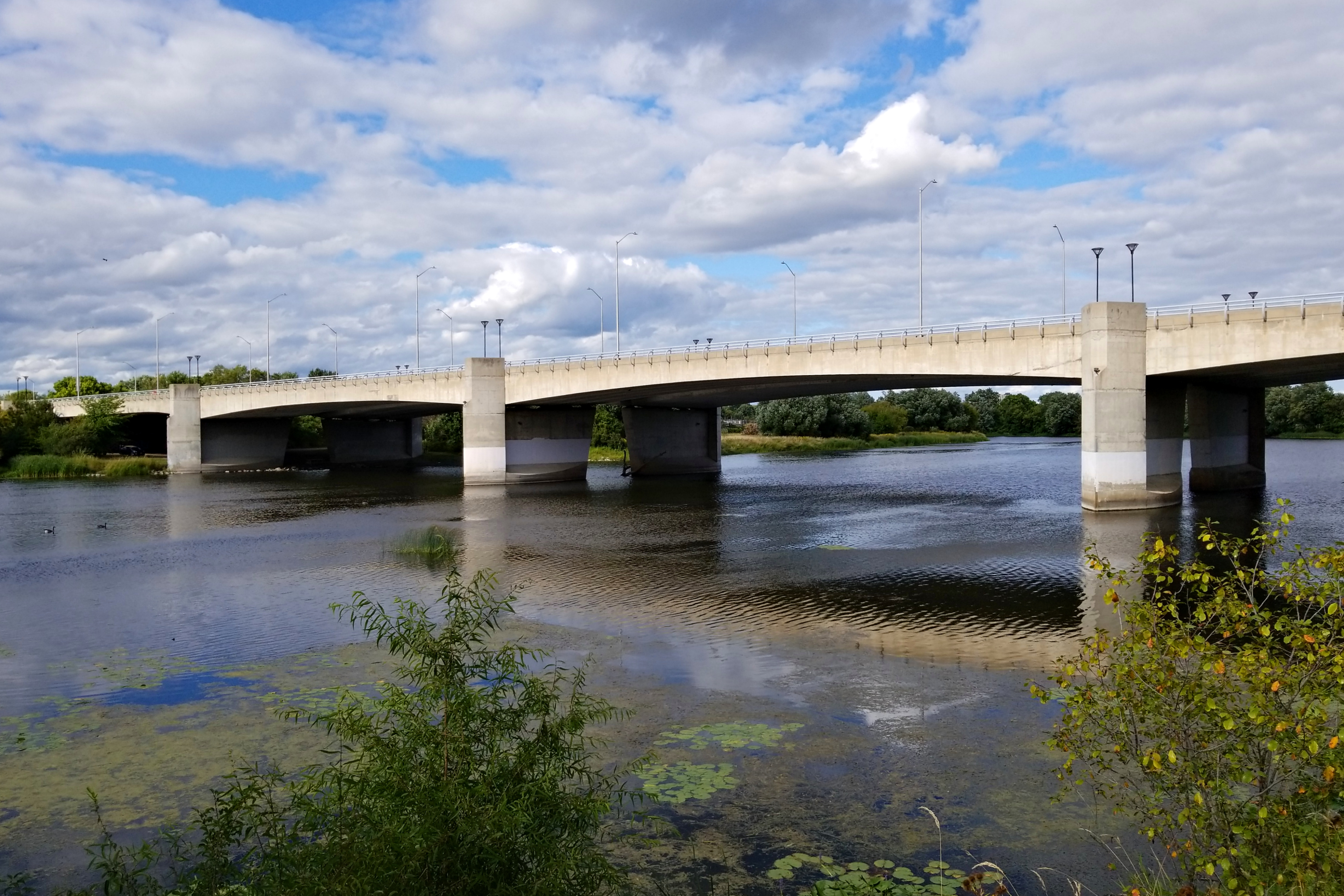
George Dunbar Bridge spanning the Rideau River

The George Dunbar Bridge is a vehicular and pedestrian bridge in Ottawa, Ontario, Canada, carrying Bronson Avenue over the Rideau River and connecting it to the Airport Parkway.

The original Dunbar Bridge was opened to traffic on December 19, 1955. It was demolished in December 1994. The current bridge was reconstructed in 1993–1996. The northbound (east) span was built in May 1993–December 1994 adjacent to the 1955 bridge. The southbound (west) span was built in 1995–96 on the site of the demolished 1955 bridge.

The bridge is named for George Harrison Dunbar (1876-1966), a prominent member of the Ontario legislature who served as MPP for Ottawa South and Ontario Minister of Municipal Affairs in 1943–1955. He personally opened the bridge at the time of its completion.
