= Somerset Street =

Somerset Street may refer to:

- Somerset Street (New Brunswick)
- Somerset Street (Ottawa)
