= Brookfield Road =

Road in Ottawa, Canada

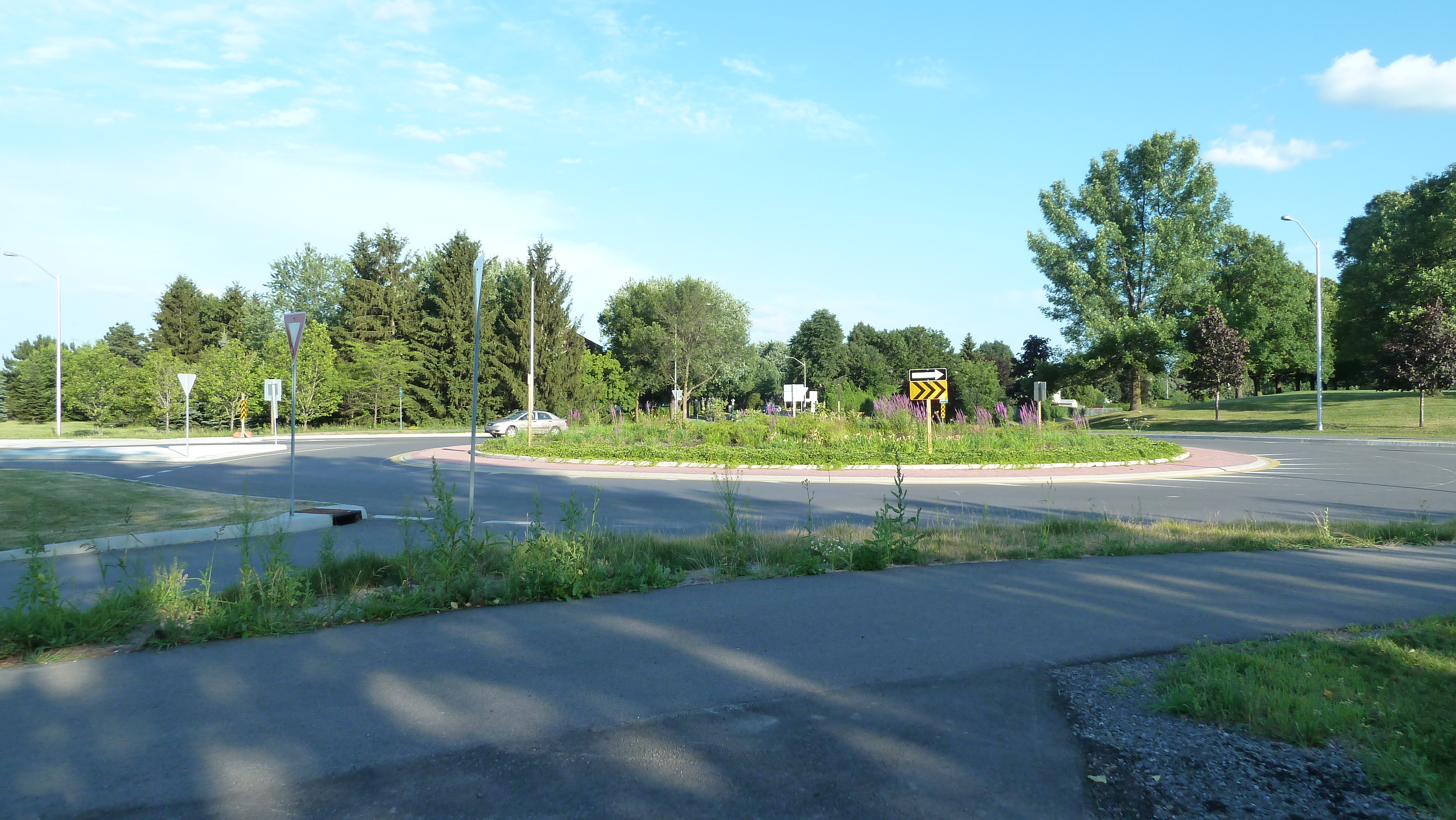
The roundabout at the intersection of Brookfield Road, Flannery Drive, and exit ramps to and from Airport Parkway

Brookfield Road (Ottawa Road #51) is a short connecting street in Ottawa, Ontario, Canada. It runs from Riverside Drive (as a continuation of Hog's Back Road through lands owned by the National Capital Commission) past Brookfield High School to the Airport Parkway, and then in a separate segment as a local road in a residential area for some distance toward Bank Street.

These two segments were continuous prior to the construction of the Airport Parkway, which eradicated a small railway-junction settlement whose traces can still be seen just southeast of the interchange.

The main segment of Brookfield is a four-lane undivided minor arterial road, with a speed limit of 50 km/h (31 mph).

Before 1997, the NCC had control over Brookfield Road, as it connected Colonel By Drive to the Airport Parkway. However, it changed jurisdiction when the Airport Parkway was handed to the Regional Municipality of Ottawa-Carleton (now the City of Ottawa), making the NCC parkway link redundant.

== See also ==
- List of Ottawa, Ontario roads
