= Corktown Footbridge =

Footbridge in Ottawa, Canada

Coordinates: 45°25′14″N 75°41′3.9″W

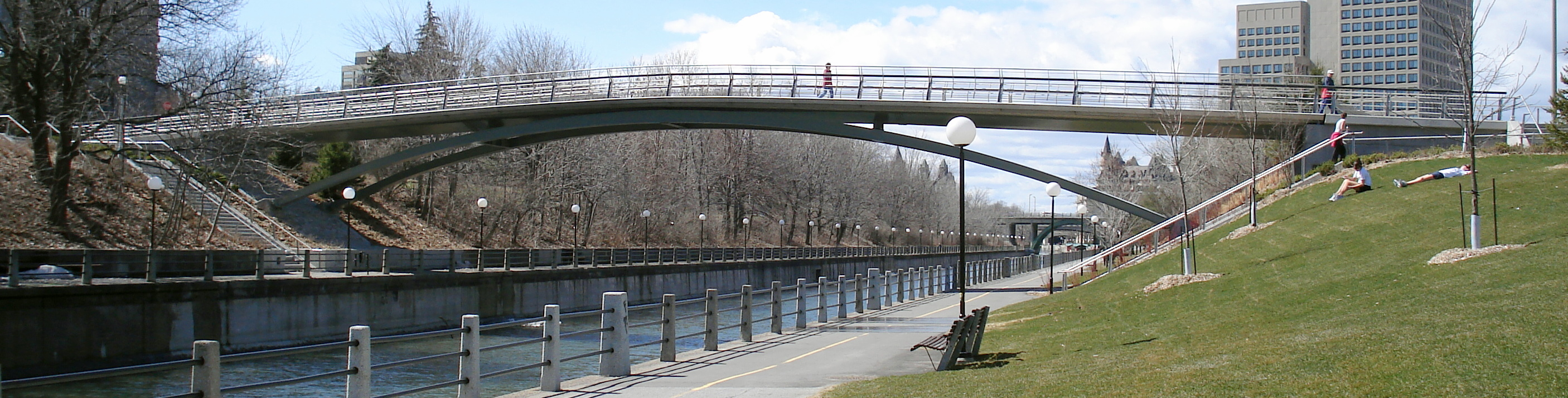
The bridge's southern side.

The Corktown Footbridge (French: Passerelle Corktown) is a pedestrian footbridge over the Rideau Canal in Ottawa, Ontario, Canada. The 70-metre (230 ft) bridge is located about 400 m (1,300 ft) south of the Laurier Avenue Bridge and connects the University of Ottawa campus with the Golden Triangle neighbourhood. It was opened on 21 September 2006.

The bridge also connects the eastern and western sides of the Rideau Canal Pathway and has links to Colonel By Drive on its eastern side and to Queen Elizabeth Driveway and Somerset Street on its western side.

The bridge's name refers to a series of shanties built along the "Deep Cut" section of the Rideau Canal during its construction. Many of the labourers living in Corktown came from County Cork in Ireland, giving it its name.

The idea of a bridge between the University of Ottawa and the Golden Triangle dates back to the 1980s. It went through many years of review and feasibility studies with no success. The university and its students were strong supporters of the concept, saying that the bridge would provide students with easier access to retail on Elgin Street and would connect the Golden Triangle to uOttawa station. City councillors Diane Holmes and Clive Doucet also lobbied heavily for the construction of a bridge. Finally, in January 2005, the city council narrowly approved a $5 million bridge project.

In spring of 2007, a naming committee was struck by councillors Diane Holmes and Georges Bédard, composed of stakeholders from communities on both sides of the bridge. The committee presented its report to a public meeting on May 29, 2007, where members of the public had an opportunity to express their preferred name from three shortlisted names: Somerset Footbridge, Charlotte Whitton Footbridge, and Corktown Footbridge. Public support for the "Corktown" name was overwhelming. The name was also promoted by groups such as the Ottawa District Labour Council, the Bytown Museum, and an ad-hoc group called "Friends of Corktown Bridge", which organized a cèilidh in advance of the public meeting. The formal ceremony to name the Corktown Footbridge was held on 11 September 2007 led by Mayor Larry O'Brien.

The Corktown Footbridge has numerous love locks attached to its railing. In 2014, Professor Murat Saatcioglu of the University of Ottawa determined that there was no risk of structural collapse from the weight of the love locks attached to the railing of the bridge. In 2019 numerous of the love locks were removed due to "the amount, placement and clumping of locks," and that city staff routinely inspected the locks and removed damaged ones.

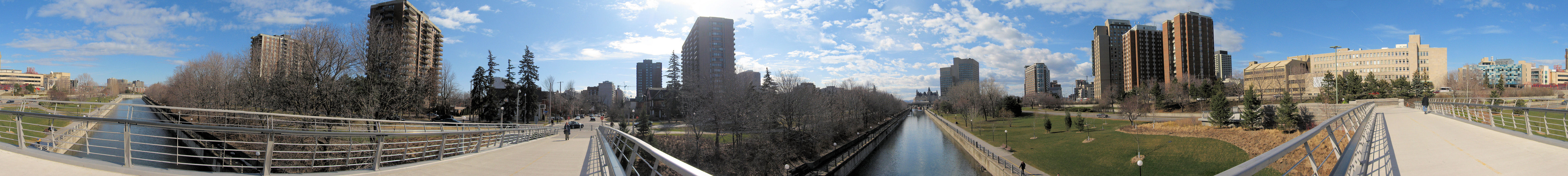
Panoramic view from the footbridge.
