= Somerset Street (Ottawa) =

Street in Ottawa, Ontario, Canada

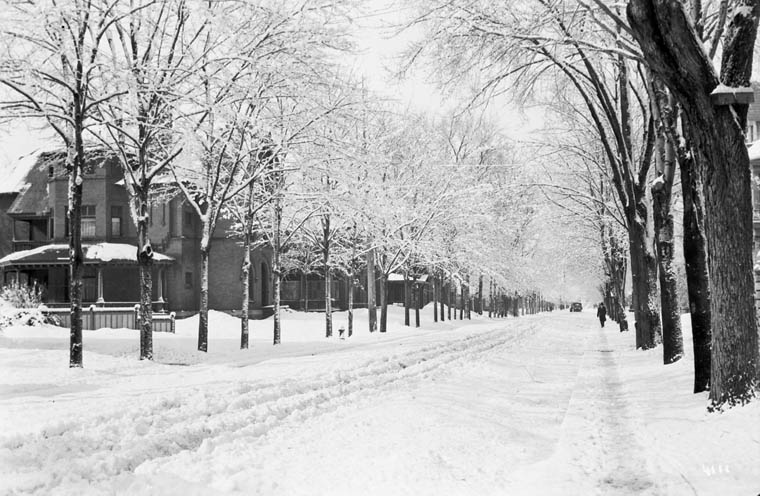
Somerset Street, 1916

Somerset Street is a street in Ottawa, Ontario, Canada. It is divided into Somerset Street East and Somerset Street West by the Rideau Canal. The western portion is internally designated as Ottawa Road #36, as part of the now-mostly unsigned Ottawa Roads system; a legacy of the former Ottawa-Carleton regional roads system.

== Somerset Street East ==
Somerset Street East is a short road that runs through the neighbourhood of Sandy Hill from the University of Ottawa campus to the west and Strathcona Park to the east. Somerset also used to extend east over the Rideau River towards St. Laurent Boulevard. However, that bridge was destroyed by flooding in 1952 and never replaced. The street was renamed Donald Street east of the river. In 2015, a new bicycle/pedestrian bridge (Adàwe Crossing) was completed across the river on the site of the old bridge, and the street has become an important bicycle corridor between the university and downtown Ottawa. By 2017, bicycle volumes accounted for 65% of street traffic and the street was re-striped with advisory bike lanes.

== Somerset Street West ==
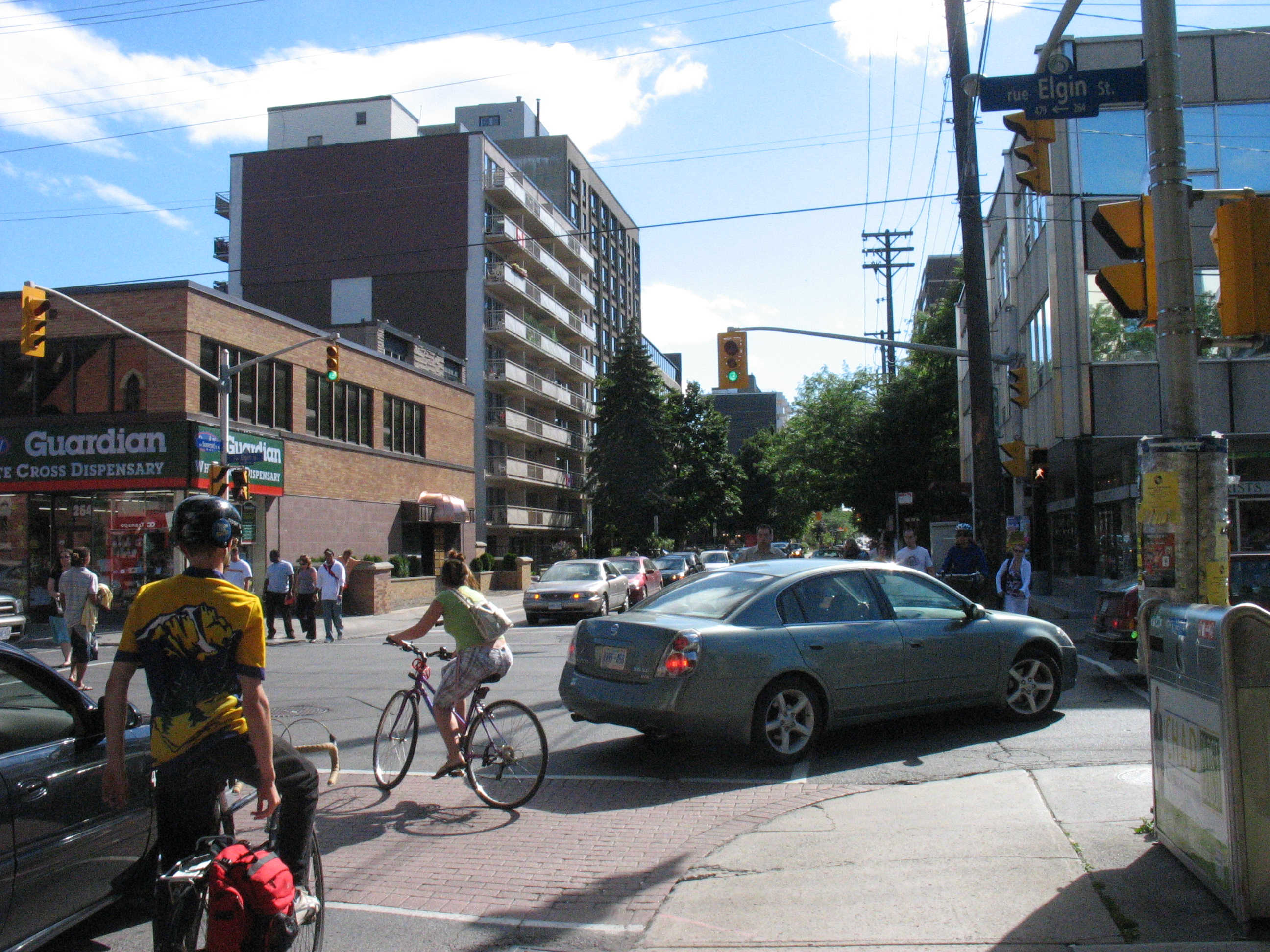
Modern view of Somerset Street West at Elgin Street, 2008

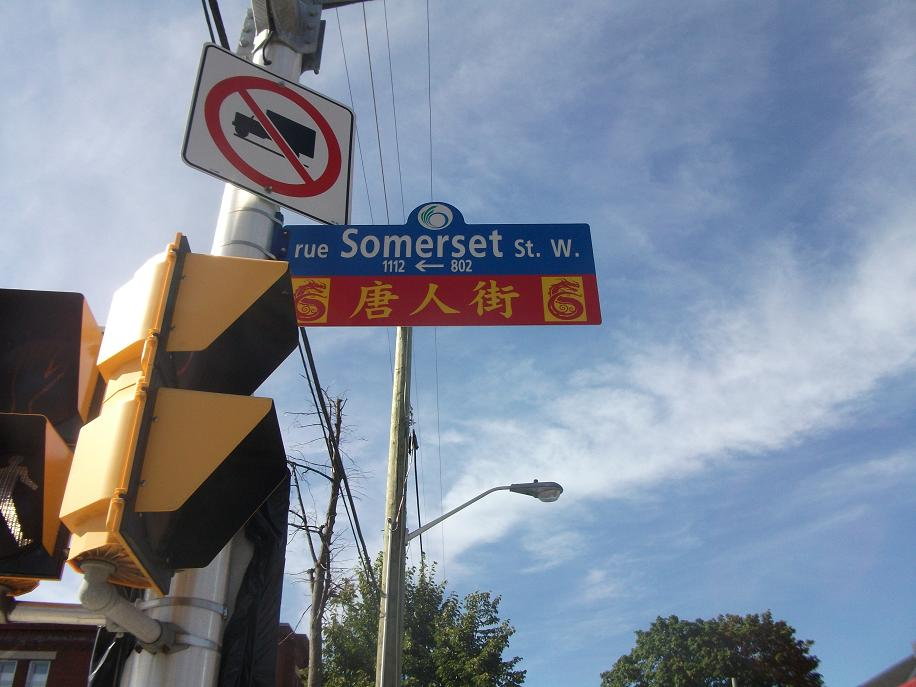
Somerset Street sign in Chinatown.

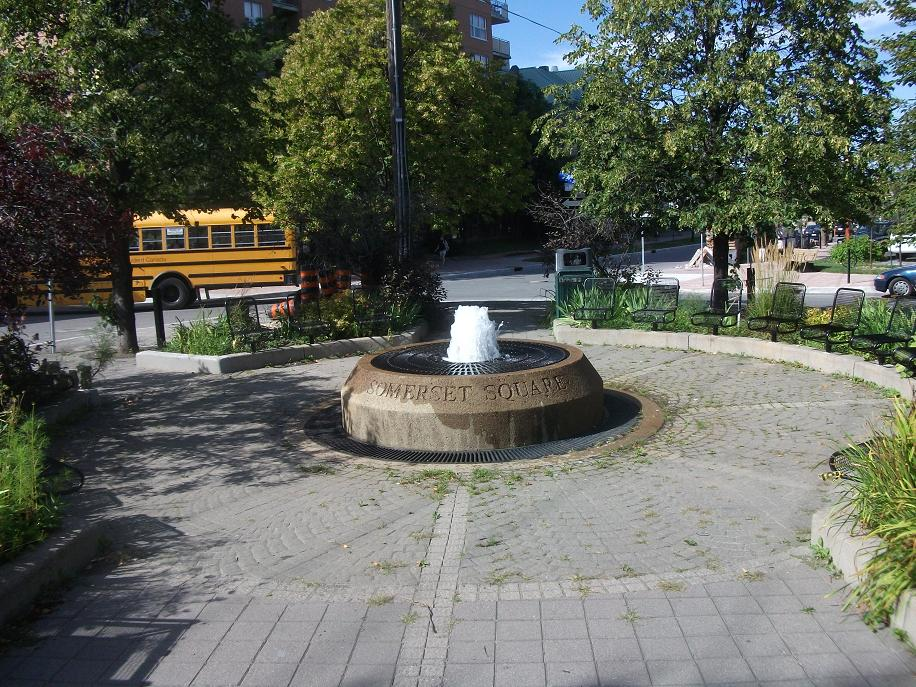
Somerset Square forms the western terminus of Somerset Street, when it turns into Wellington Street West.

Somerset Street West begins at the Queen Elizabeth Driveway in the east and continues west to Wellington Street West where it ends at Somerset Square. Somerset Street West houses the backbone of Ottawa's Chinatown, between Bay Street in the east to Preston Street in the west, which is the centre of Ottawa's Little Italy. The area of the street between Bank and O'Connor is known as Somerset Village.

The section west of Booth street was formerly known as Cedar Street, and the section between Booth and Bell streets was formerly Reserve Street.

The Ottawa Electric Railway ran along Somerset Street West between Bank Street going west towards Britannia Park.

331 Somerset Street, a former home of Canadian Prime Minister William Lyon Mackenzie King from 1901 to 1910 during his time as Minister of Labour, is designated as an Ottawa heritage property.

== In between ==
In the 1870s, as the area was developed, a bridge was proposed linking the two Somerset Streets over the Rideau Canal. However, this bridge never came into existence. Today, on the east side of the canal, there is a pedestrian link from the multi-use pathway that runs alongside the canal, across Colonel By Drive, and under Nicholas Street and the transitway, onto the University of Ottawa campus. The street continues through the campus as Marie Curie Private, with traffic restricted to bicycles in the westbound direction.

The Corktown Footbridge connects the two sides, but is restricted to non-motorized traffic. The bridge opened to the public on September 21, 2006.
