= 331 Somerset Street =

331 Somerset
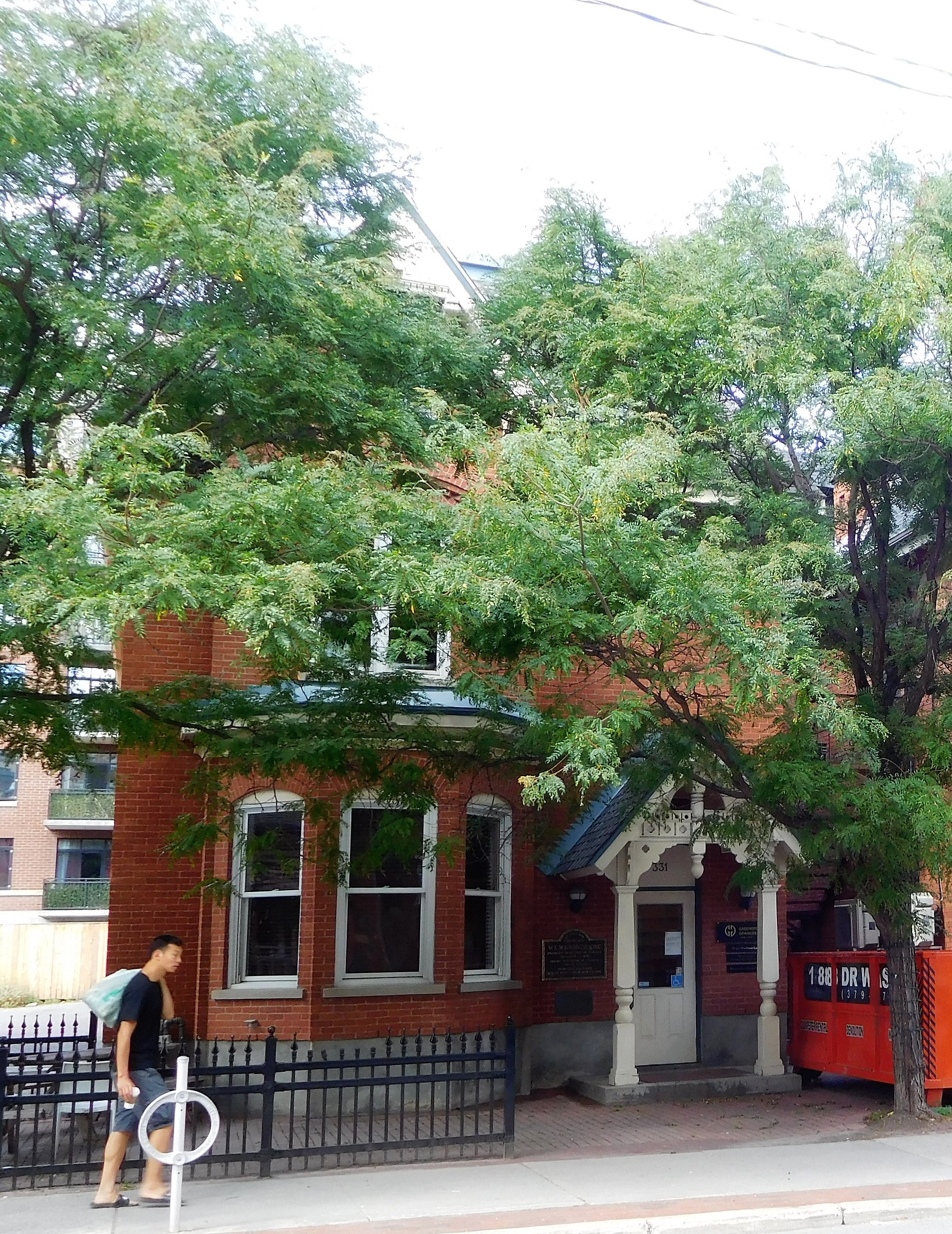

- Location within Ottawa

General information
- Location: Ottawa, Ontario, Canada, 331 Somerset Street
- Coordinates: 45.24585°N 75.41425°W

Renovating team
- Architects: Barry Podolsky, 1997 reconstruct

A former home of Canadian Prime Minister William Lyon Mackenzie King from 1901 to 1910 during his time as Minister of Labour. 331 Somerset Street, is designated as an Ottawa heritage property.

== King's Residence ==
The 1901 Ottawa City Directory listed 331 Somerset as the home of Alexander R. Cope and his sons William, a boilermaker, William V. a clerk, and Edward B. an insurance agent.

King and his close friend, the journalist Henry Albert Harper whom he professed to love with a deeper love than the confirmed bachelor could ever feel for a woman, moved into the home in September 1901, three months before Harper's tragic 1901 drowning; the pair having spent the previous year living together at 202 Maria Street (now named Laurier Street West). Harper had hung a print of George Frederic Watts' "Sir Galahad" over his desk at the house, and King later erected a statue of Galahad in memory of his deceased friend.

King remained in the house until 1910 when he acquired a more "prestigious" address at the Roxborough Apartments.

== Later uses ==
In 1951, the building was operating as an inn that attracted American tourists with the draw that Mackenzie King had lived in the house.

By 1976, the building had been converted by Dodie Lewis into the Doma II Art Gallery, which housed works by Ann Forman and Richard Robertson among others. By 1979, "Marygold Antiques, Crafts, Cards and Art" was also run out of the building.

== Fire ==
As of 1997, ownership had passed to Anthony and Joseph Kwai. In February 1997, a fire destroyed the heritage property which was housing a financial investment firm and a deli restaurant. A demolition permit was obtained since the building was deemed "beyond repair", and architect Barry Podolsky was retained to try and match the original style of the building for its reconstruction. In 1998, the reconstruction was granted the Award of Merit for Architectural Conservation by the city.
