= Champlain Bridge (Ottawa) =

Champlain Bridge Pont Champlain
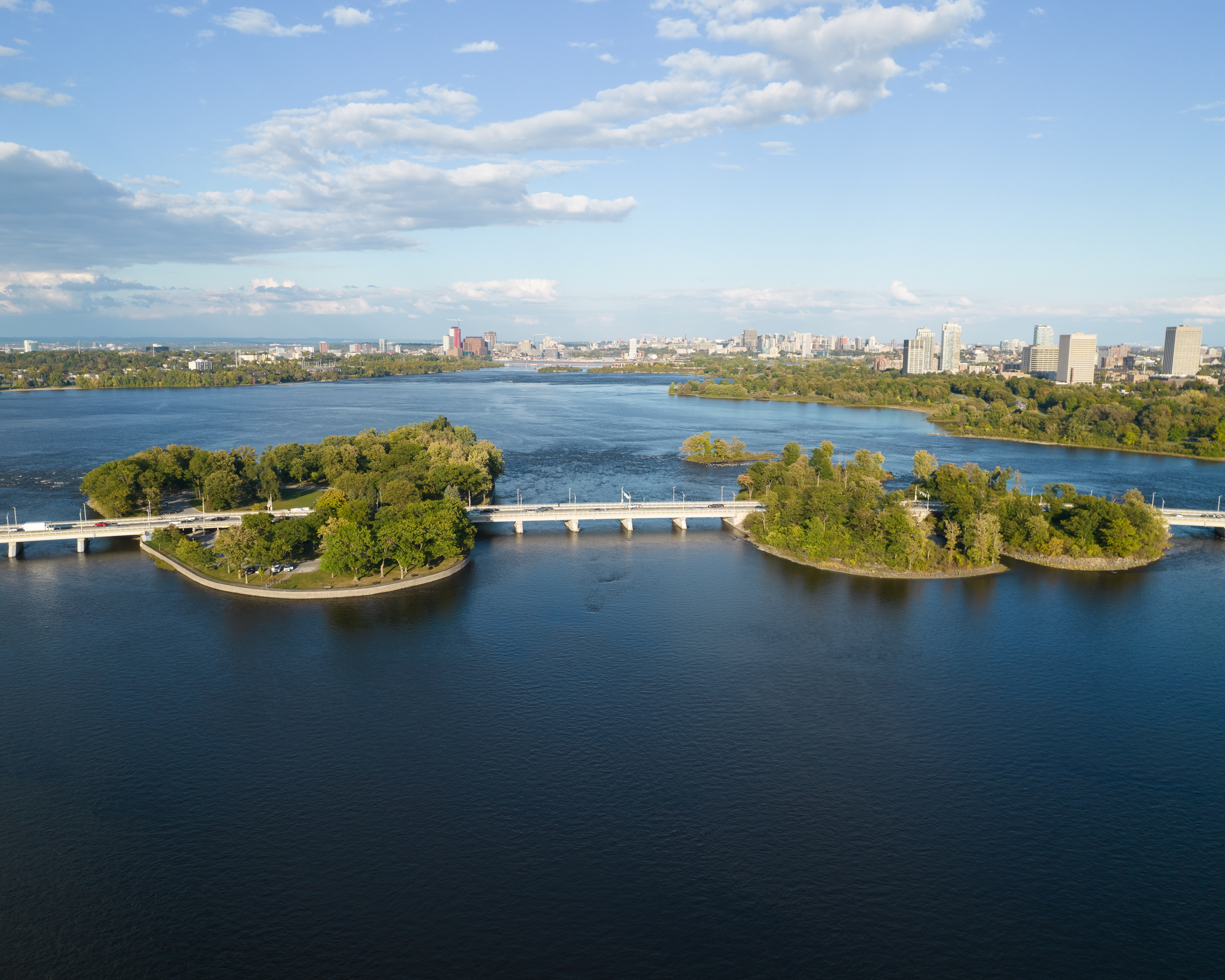
- Champlain Bridge over the Ottawa River
- Coordinates: 45°24′35″N 75°45′34″W
- Carries: 3 lanes connecting
- Crosses: Ottawa River
- Locale: Ottawa, Ontario
- Owner: Government of Canada
- Maintained by: National Capital Commission

Characteristics
- Design: concrete girder bridge
- Total length: 1.1 km (0.68 mi)
- Width: 3 lanes connecting Place Samuel de Champlain and Island Park Drive, bicycle traffic
- Clearance above: 2.7 metres (8.9 ft)
- Clearance below: 3 metres (9.8 ft)

History
- Construction end: 1928
- Opened: 1924, 1928

Location
- Interactive map of Champlain Bridge

The Champlain Bridge (French: Pont Champlain) crosses the Ottawa River about 5 km (3.1 mi) west of Parliament Hill, joining the communities of Ottawa, Ontario and Gatineau, Quebec. It is the westernmost link between the two cities.

It was originally built between 1924 and 1928 by the Federal District Commission, the predecessor to the National Capital Commission (NCC), and the NCC continues to maintain the bridge. The bridge consists of 4 spans and crosses Riopelle, Cunningham and Bate Islands in the Ottawa River. The total length of the bridge is 1.1 km (0.68 mi), making it the longest bridge spanning the Ottawa River.

On the Ontario side, it is a continuation of Island Park Drive and is also connected to the Kichi Zibi Mikan. It connects to Aylmer Road on the Quebec side.

The bridge was named after Samuel de Champlain who is associated with the portage around the rapids in this section of the river. The short access roadway on the Aylmer side of the bridge is called Place Samuel de Champlain.

A 2 mi (3.2 km) stretch of the Ottawa River that the Champlain Bridge passes over was not charted by the Canadian Hydrographic Service.

== Construction projects ==
A third reversible lane was added when the bridge was rebuilt in 2002, which is a high-occupancy vehicle lane used for crossings in the direction of peak traffic. In 2022 and 2023 the bridge underwent its second major renovation project. In August–November 2022 the west lane was replaced, and in 2023 the middle and east lanes were replaced. This is possibly the final update to the bridge before it will need to be replaced.

== See also ==
- List of bridges in Ottawa
- List of bridges in Canada
- List of crossings of the Ottawa River
