= Hog's Back Road =

Road in Ottawa, Canada

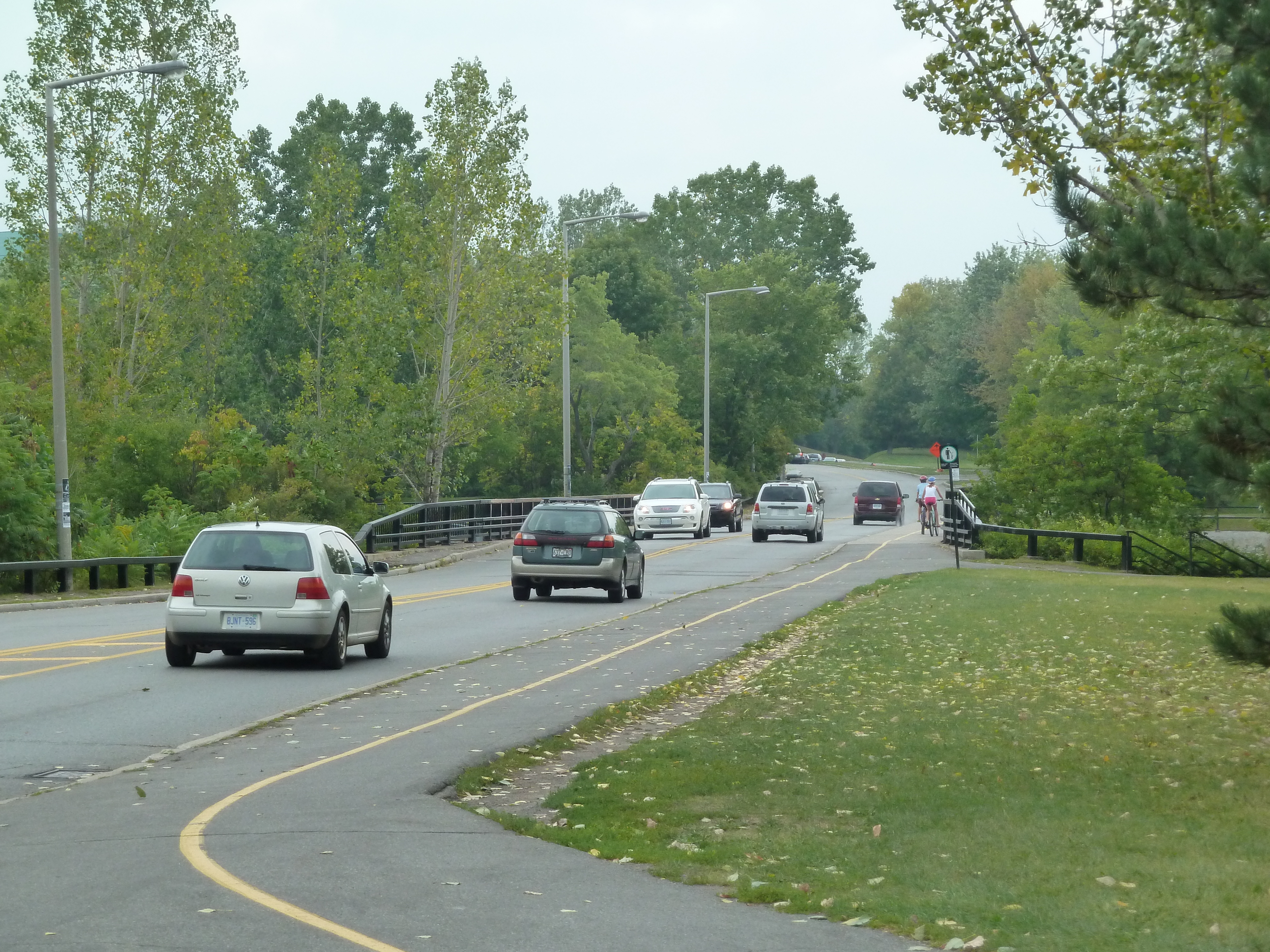
Hog's Back Road looking east

Hog's Back Road is a 1 km (0.62 mi) road in Ottawa, Ontario, Canada. The road connects Meadowlands Drive and Prince of Wales Drive to Riverside Drive and Brookfield Road. The road marks the boundary line between Mooney's Bay Park and Hog's Back Park. It goes over the dam creating Mooney's Bay and Hog's Back Falls, continuing over the Rideau Canal via the Hog's Back swing bridge, a structure designed to clear the channel for taller boats. The road also runs past the spot where the Rideau Canal separates from the Rideau River.

== Major Intersections ==
- Prince of Wales Drive / Meadowlands Drive

Hog's Back Bridge

- Colonel By Drive

Bridge over Rideau River and Hog's Back Falls

- Riverside Drive / Brookfield Road (to Airport Parkway)
