= Aviation Parkway (Ottawa) =

Scenic parkway in Ottawa, Ontario, Canada

- Aviation Parkway highlighted in red
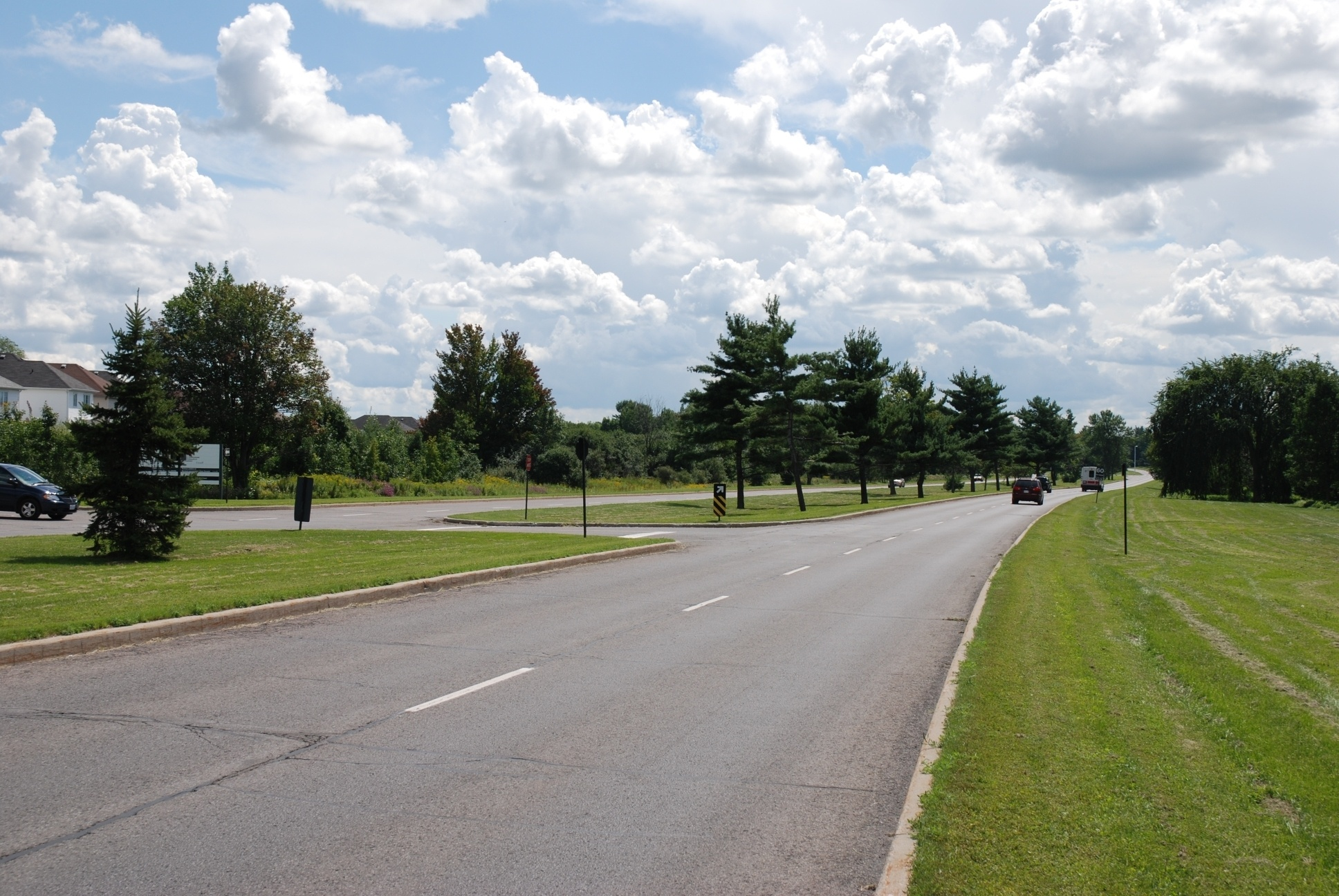
- Looking south from Montreal Road

Route information
- Maintained by National Capital Commission
- Length: 4.8 km (3.0 mi)

Major junctions
- South end: Highway 417
- North end: Canada Aviation Museum

Location
- Country: Canada
- Province: Ontario
- Major cities: Ottawa

Highway system
- NCC parkways in Ottawa
(in alphabetical order)
Aviation Parkway	Colonel By Drive →

The Aviation Parkway is a scenic parkway in Ottawa, Ontario, Canada.

== Route description ==
The parkway begins at Highway 417 and proceeds north, passing beside Ken Steele Park and Ottawa's only French college, Collège La Cité. It continues north, passing beside the national headquarters of the Canada Mortgage and Housing Corporation, crossing Montreal Road, and passing beside the Montfort Hospital. It ends at the Canada Aviation and Space Museum and Rockcliffe Airport.

The parkway is bordered on either side by significant woods and fields that are the property of the National Capital Commission.

== History ==
The Aviation Parkway is the youngest of the NCC's scenic parkways, having been built in 1988. Being a federal roadway, the Aviation Parkway is patrolled by the RCMP instead of the local police force.

The northern terminus of the parkway is a contentious candidate for the site of Ottawa's easternmost interprovincial bridge. The bridge would cross the Ottawa River via Kettle Island, connecting Ottawa to Gatineau, Quebec. A bridge has been proposed at this site dating back as far as 1888, and proposals have been put forward and shelved regularly in the modern era.
