= Hog's Back Bridge =

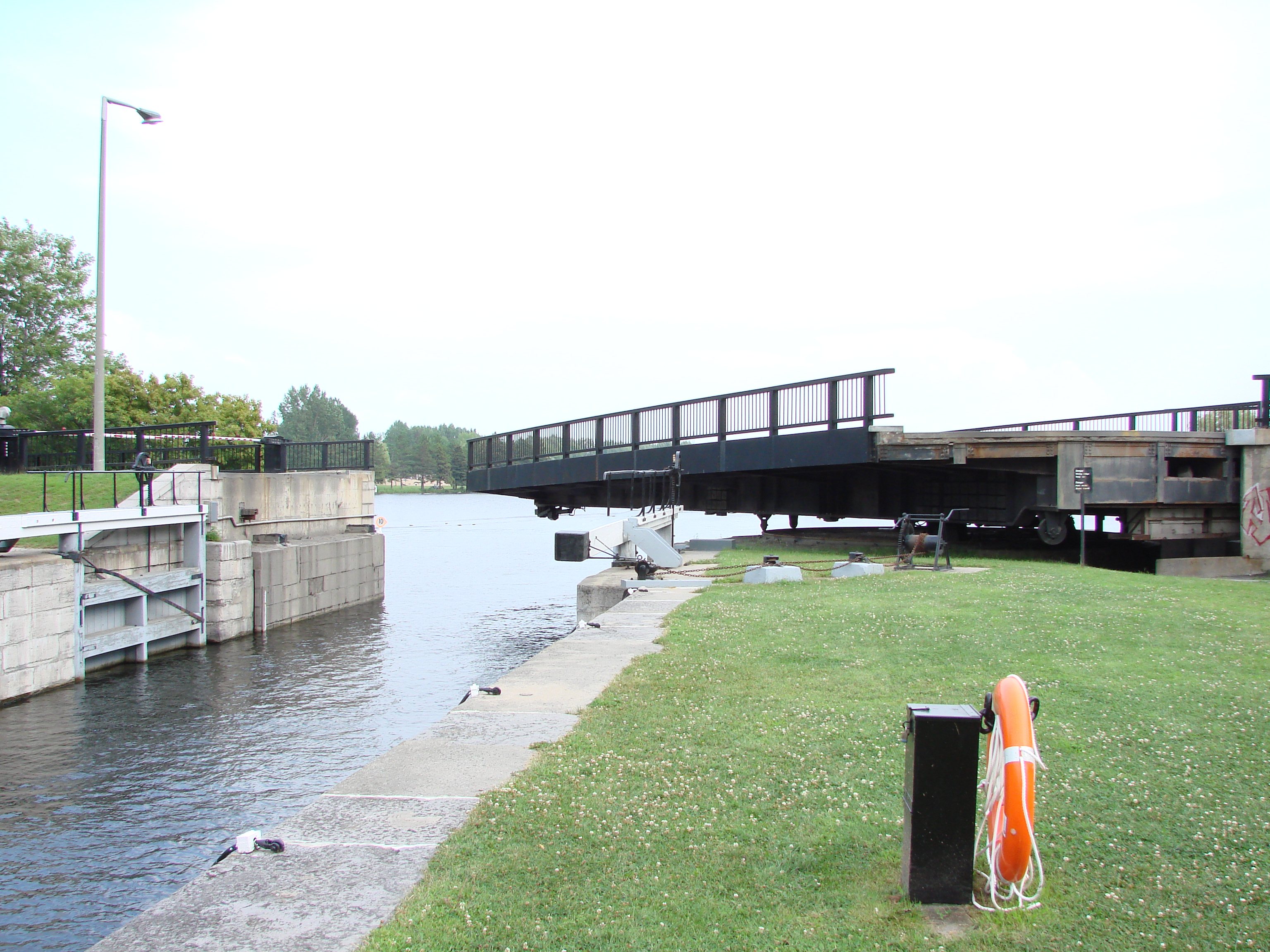
- The Hog's Back Bridge partially open.
- Coordinates: 45°22′13″N 75°41′58″W
- Carries: Hog's Back Road
- Crosses: Rideau Canal
- Maintained by: National Capital Commission

Characteristics
- Design: Asymmetrical swing bridge

History
- Opened: 1976

Statistics
- Daily traffic: 18,000-26,000
- Toll: None

Location
- Interactive map of Hog's Back Bridge

Hog's Back Bridge is an asymmetrical swing bridge in Ottawa, Ontario, Canada. Located at the intersection of Mooney's Bay and the Hog's Back locks, it crosses the Rideau Canal and carries 2 lanes of Hog's Back Road and a sidewalk. The swing bridge operates from May to October when boats exceeding 9 feet (2.7 m) in height need to pass via the canal underneath.

The bridge is hydraulically controlled. Two wedge cylinders secure the bridge and raise the overhanging edge in place at road level. When the bridge is to be opened, four barriers are lowered to block traffic from entering the bridge deck. The cylinders are withdrawn which lowers the bridge down onto a circular rail track. This movement also takes the weight of the bridge off of the west side bearings. Once the limit switches sense the wedge cylinders are fully retracted, the bridge is pivoted. The hydraulic power unit has 2 main pumps which can be run independently or together, and one small backup pump to be run off a generator if need be.

The bridge was closed for extensive rehabilitation from August 2019 to October 2020. Despite the repairs, the bridge had to be closed two separate times between June and July 2021 due to issues with the hydraulic system.
