= Parkway =

Landscaped thoroughfare

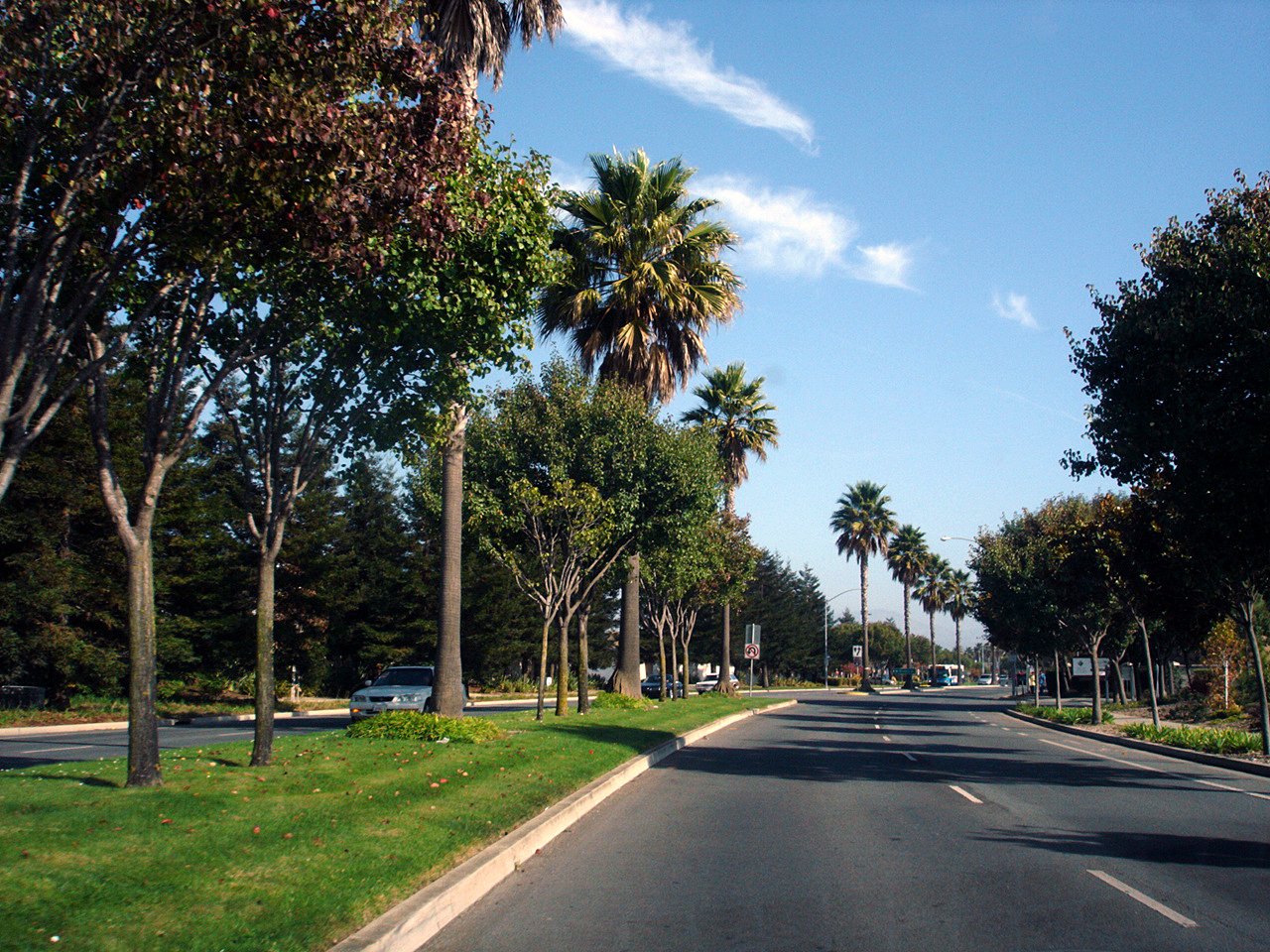
Harden Parkway in Salinas, California

A parkway is a landscaped thoroughfare. The term is particularly used for a roadway in a park or connecting to a park from which trucks and other heavy vehicles are excluded.

Over the years, many different types of roads have been labeled parkways. The term may be used to describe city streets as narrow as two lanes with a landscaped median, wide landscaped setbacks, or both.

The term has also been applied to scenic highways and to limited-access roads more generally. Many parkways originally intended for scenic, recreational driving have evolved into major urban and commuter routes.

== United States ==
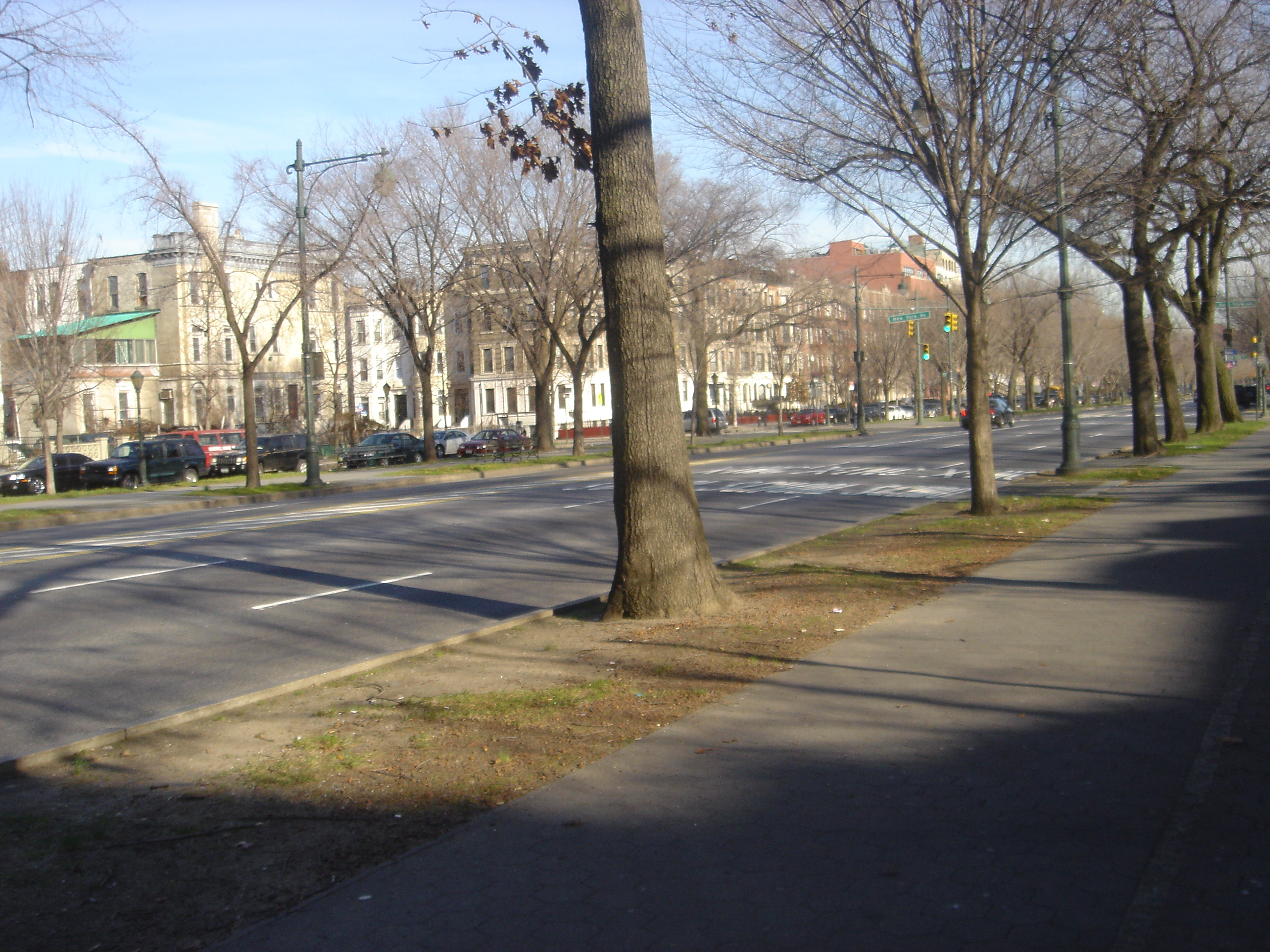
Brooklyn's Eastern Parkway in New York City, the world's first parkway, according to the New York City Department of Parks and Recreation.

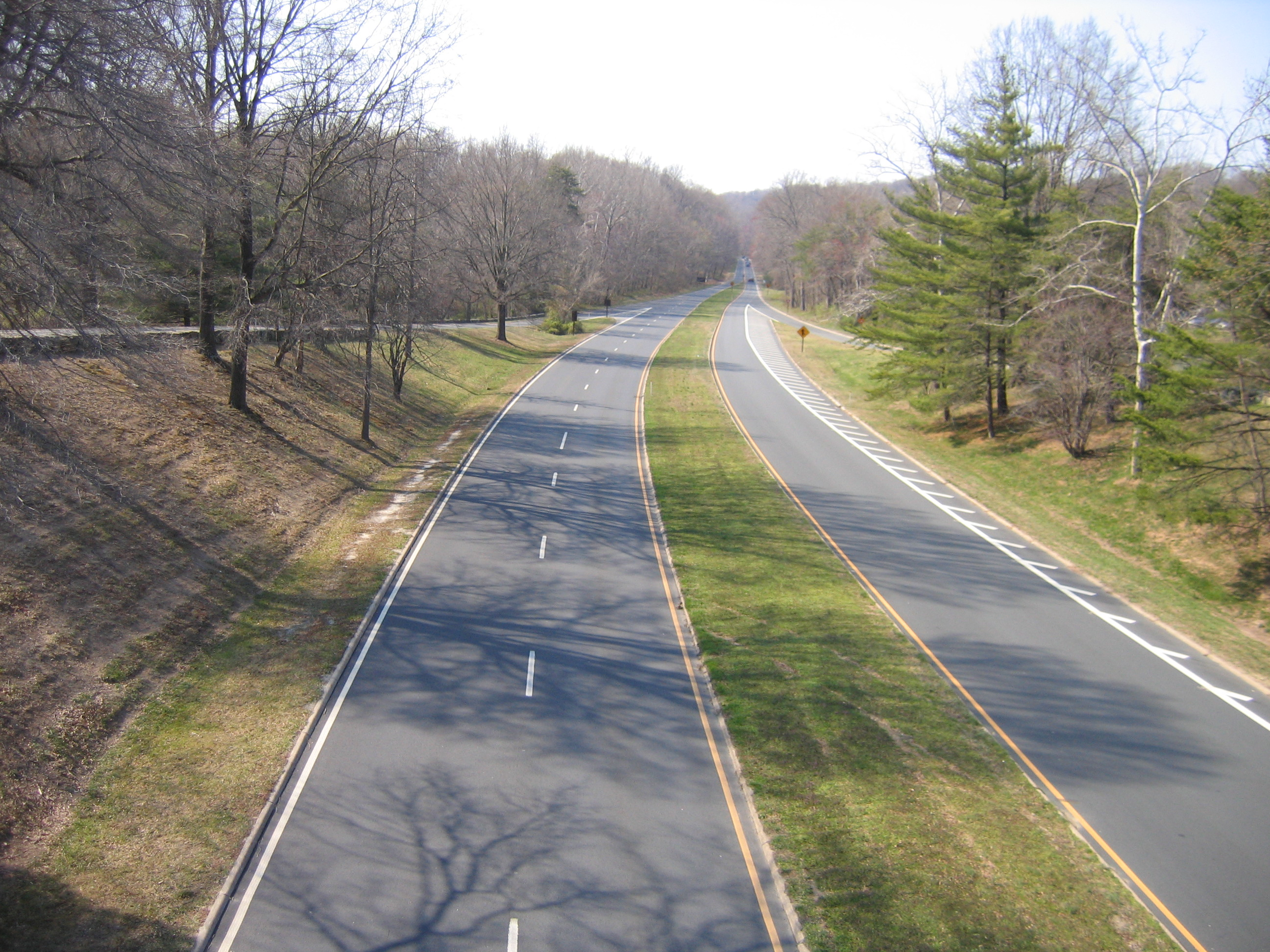
The Clara Barton Parkway in Maryland

=== Scenic roads ===
The first parkways in the United States were developed during the late 19th century by landscape architects Frederick Law Olmsted and Calvert Vaux as roads that separated pedestrians, bicyclists, equestrians, and horse carriages, such as Eastern Parkway, which is credited as the world's first parkway, and Ocean Parkway in the New York City borough of Brooklyn. The term "parkway" to define this type of road was coined by Calvert Vaux and Frederick Law Olmsted in their proposal to link city and suburban parks with "pleasure roads".

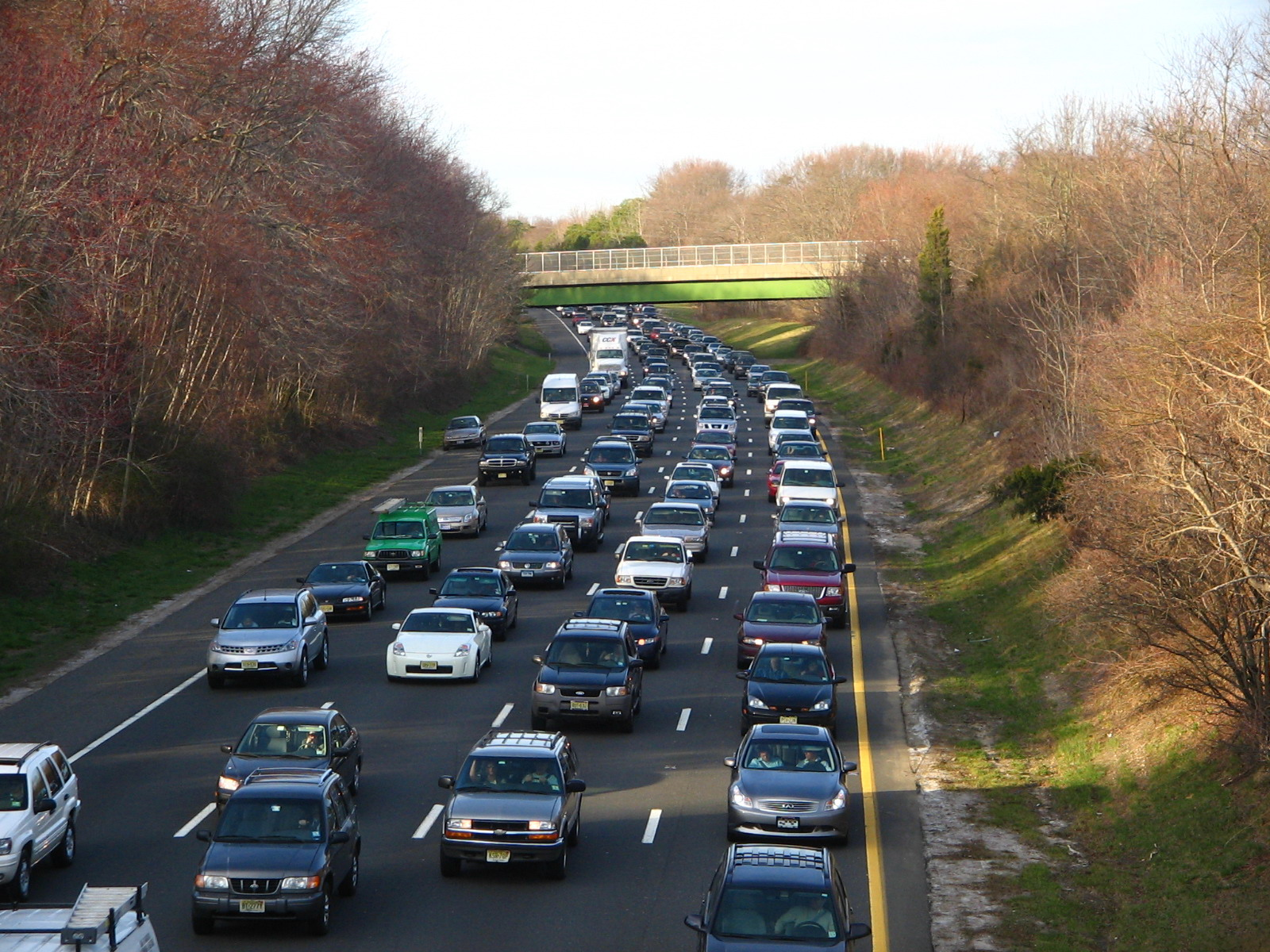
Heavy traffic on the Garden State Parkway in Monmouth County, New Jersey, in the New York Metropolitan Area, United States. This is one of the world's busiest roadways.

In Buffalo, New York, Olmsted and Vaux used parkways with landscaped medians and setbacks to create the first interconnected park and parkway system in the United States. Bidwell Parkway and Chapin Parkway are 200 foot wide city streets with only one lane for cars in each direction and broad landscaped medians that provide a pleasant, shaded route to the park and serve as mini-parks within the neighborhood. The Rhode Island Metropolitan Park Commission developed several parkways in the Providence area.

Other parkways, such as Park Presidio Boulevard in San Francisco, California, were designed to serve larger volumes of traffic.

During the early 20th century, the meaning of the word was expanded to include limited-access highways designed for recreational driving of automobiles, with landscaping. These parkways originally provided scenic routes without very slow or commercial vehicles, at grade intersections, or pedestrian traffic. Examples are the Merritt Parkway in Connecticut and the Vanderbilt Motor Parkway in New York. But their success led to more development, expanding a city's boundaries, eventually limiting the parkway's recreational driving use. The Arroyo Seco Parkway between Downtown Los Angeles and Pasadena, California, is an example of lost pastoral aesthetics. It and others have become major commuting routes, while retaining the name "parkway".

=== Early high speed roads ===
In New York City, construction on the Long Island Motor Parkway (Vanderbilt Parkway) began in 1906 and planning for the Bronx River Parkway in 1907. In the 1920s, the New York City Metropolitan Area's parkway system grew under the direction of Robert Moses, the president of the New York State Council of Parks and Long Island State Park Commission, who used parkways to provide access to newly created state parks, especially for city dwellers. As Commissioner of New York City Parks under Mayor LaGuardia, he extended the parkways to the heart of the city, creating and linking its parks to the greater metropolitan systems.

Most of the New York metropolitan parkways were designed by Gilmore Clark. The famed "Gateway to New England" Merritt Parkway in Connecticut was designed in the 1930s as a pleasurable alternative for affluent locals to the congested Boston Post Road, running through forest with each bridge designed uniquely to enhance the scenery. Another example is the Sprain Brook Parkway from lower-Westchester to connect to the Taconic State Parkway to Chatham, New York. Landscape architect George Kessler designed extensive parkway systems for Kansas City, Missouri; Memphis, Tennessee; Indianapolis; and other cities at the beginning of the 20th century.

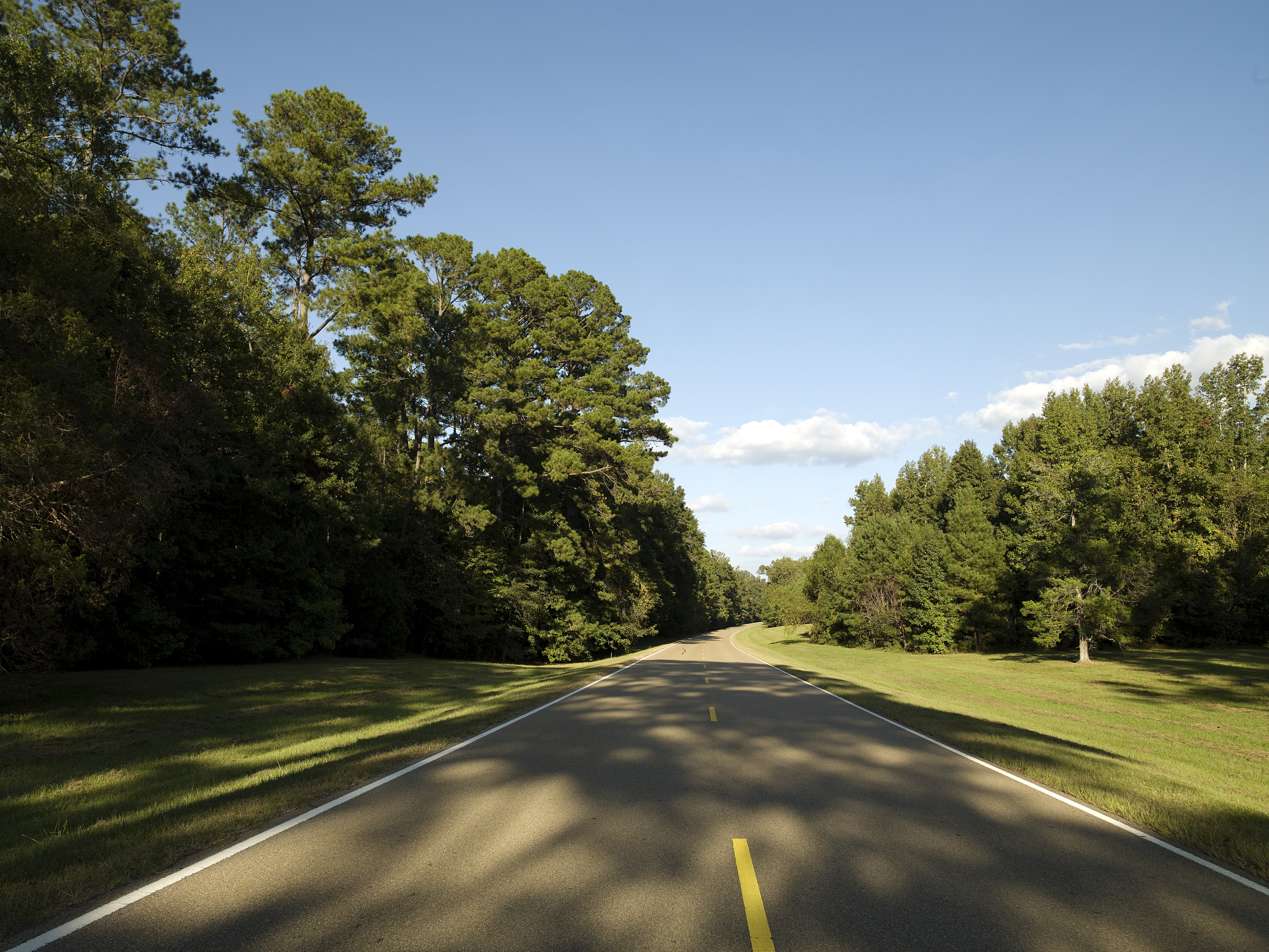
The Natchez Trace Parkway

=== New Deal roads ===
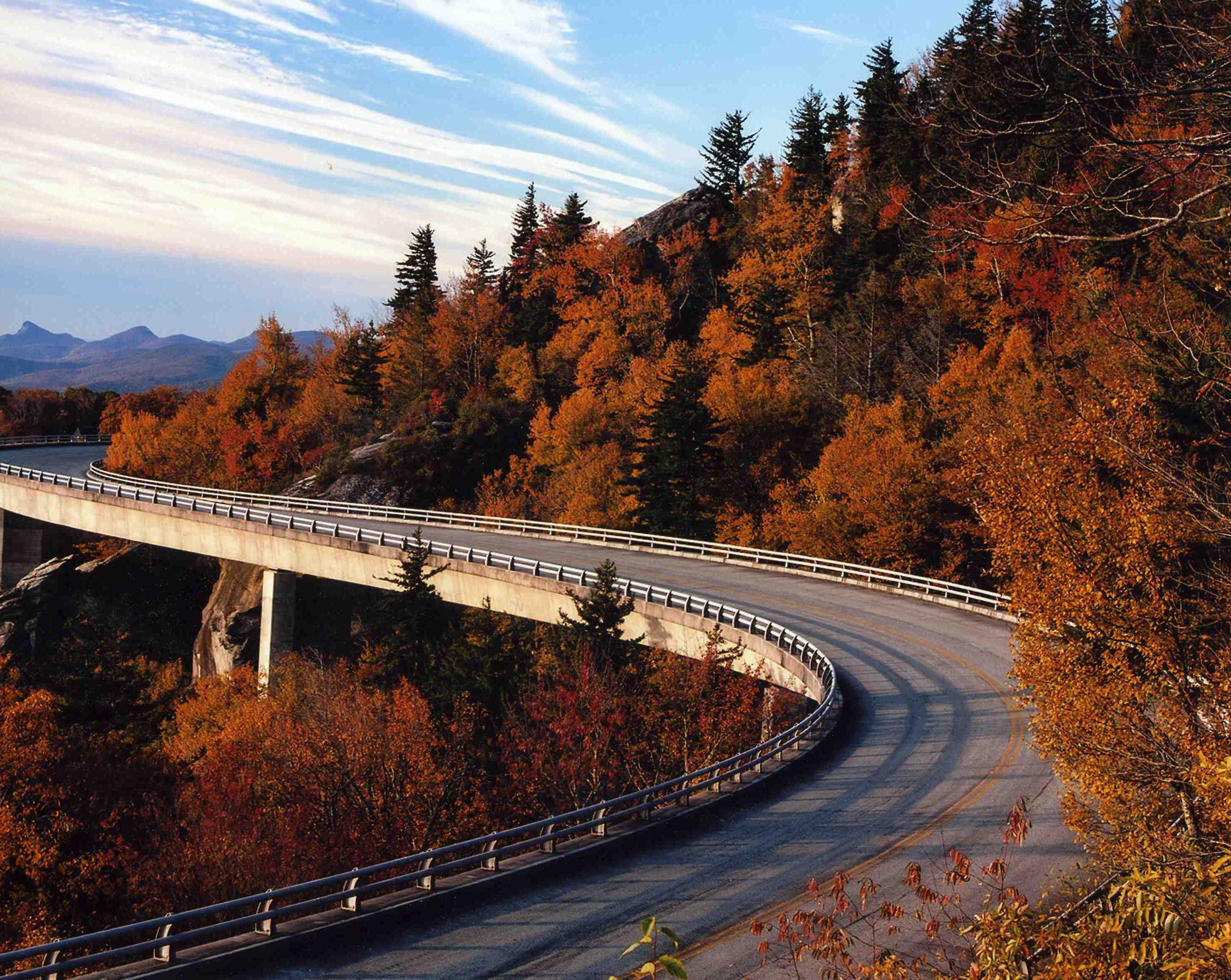
The Linn Cove Viaduct on the Blue Ridge Parkway

In the 1930s, as part of the New Deal, the U.S. federal government constructed National Parkways designed for recreational driving and to commemorate historic trails and routes. These divided four-lane parkways have lower speed limits and are maintained by the National Park Service. An example is the Civilian Conservation Corps (CCC) built Blue Ridge Parkway in the Appalachian Mountains of North Carolina and Virginia.

Others are Skyline Drive in Virginia; the Natchez Trace Parkway in Mississippi, Alabama, and Tennessee; and the Colonial Parkway in eastern Virginia's Historic Triangle area. The George Washington Memorial Parkway and the Clara Barton Parkway, running along the Potomac River near Washington, D.C., and Alexandria, Virginia, were also constructed during this era.

=== Post-war parkways ===
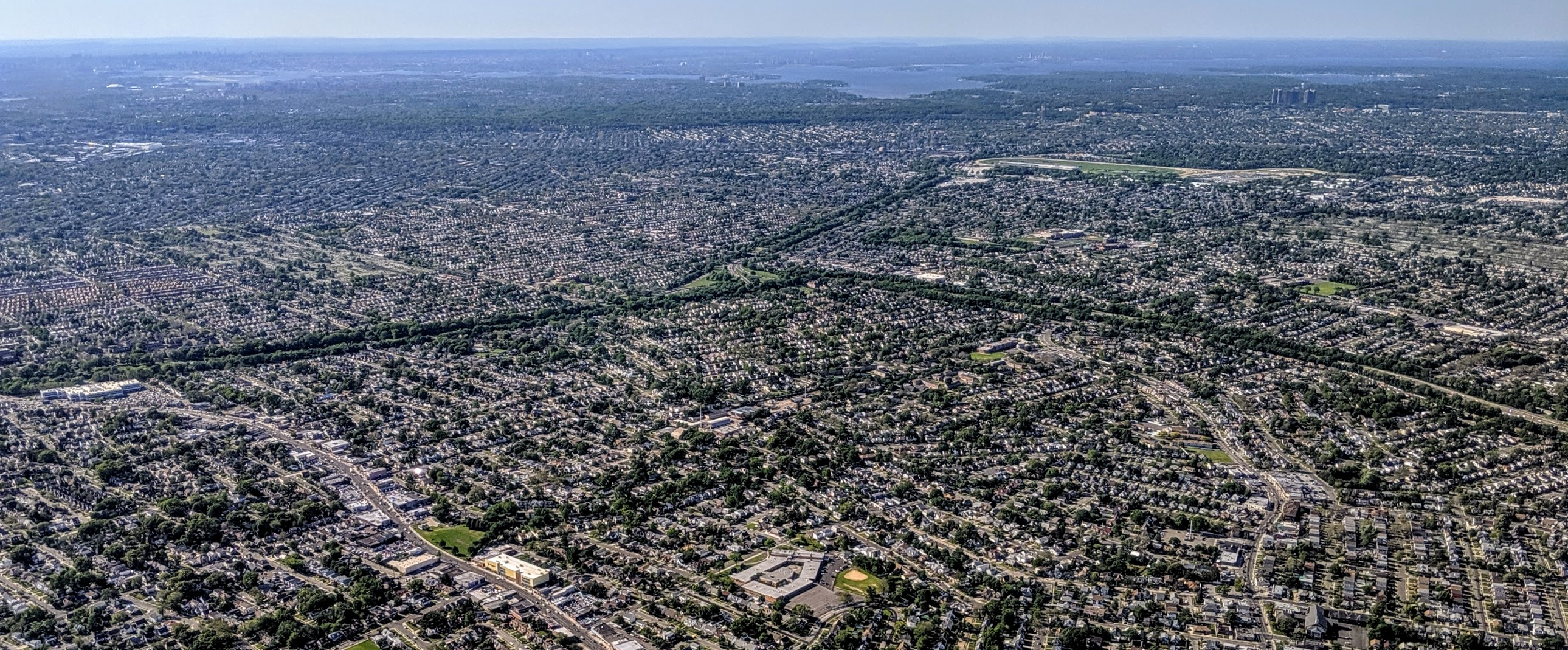
Aerial view of Valley Stream (foreground) and more of Nassau County, New York, including the Belt Parkway (left), Southern State Parkway (right), and Cross Island Parkway (center rear)

In Kentucky the term "parkway" designates a freeway in the Kentucky Parkway system, with nine built in the 1960s and 1970s. They were toll roads until the construction bonds were repaid; the last of these roads to charge tolls became freeways in 2006.

The Arroyo Seco Parkway from Pasadena to Los Angeles, built in 1940, was the first segment of the vast Southern California freeway system. It became part of State Route 110 and was renamed the Pasadena Freeway. A 2010 restoration of the freeway brought the Arroyo Seco Parkway designation back.

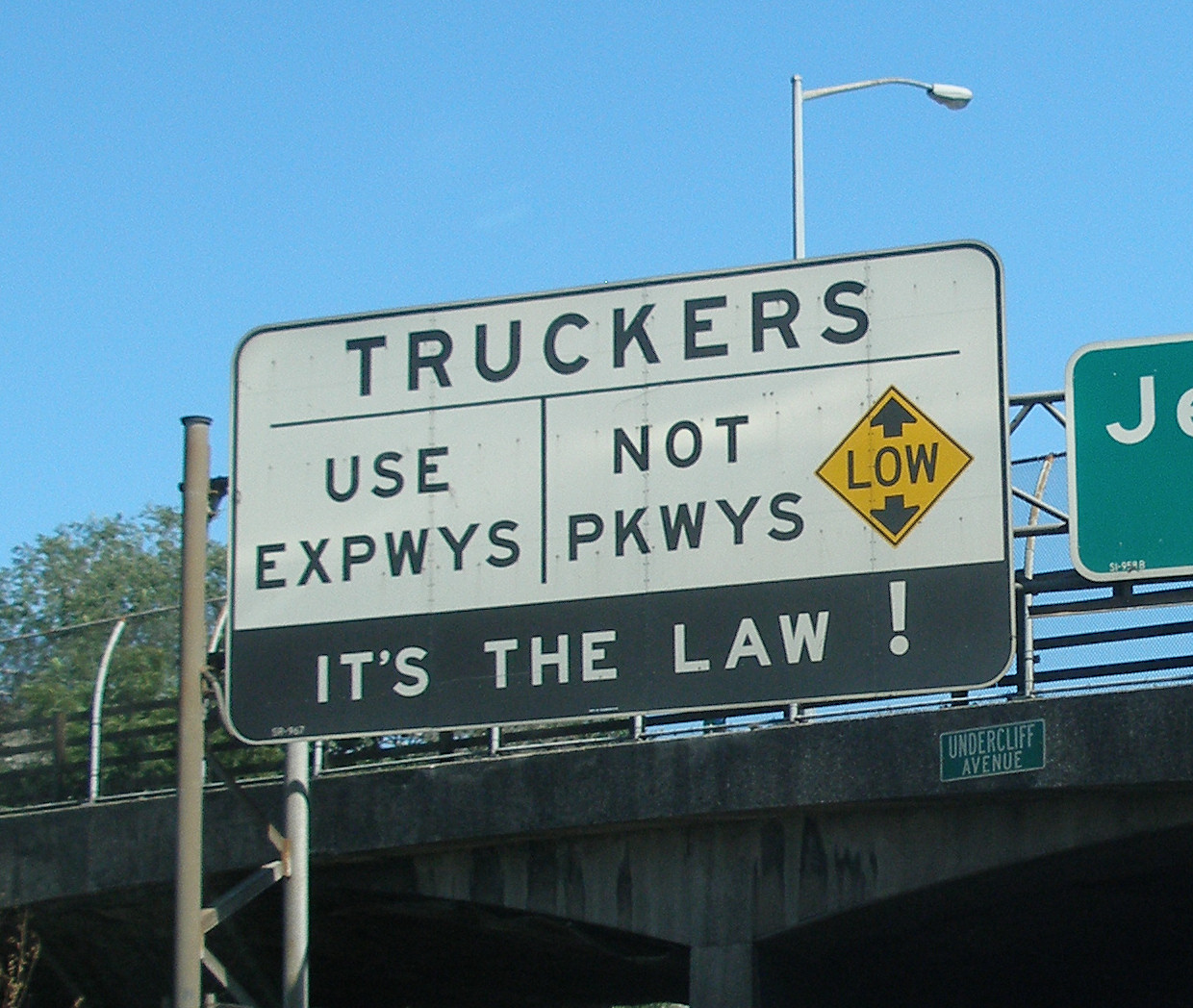
Sign informing truckers that it is illegal for their vehicles to use a parkway in New York City.

In the New York metropolitan area, contemporary parkways are predominantly limited-access highways or freeways restricted to non-commercial traffic, excluding trucks and tractor-trailers. Some have low overpasses that also exclude buses. The Vanderbilt Parkway, an exception in western Suffolk County, is a surviving remnant of the Long Island Motor Parkway that became a surface street, no longer with controlled-access or non-commercial vehicle restrictions. The Palisades Interstate Parkway is a post-war parkway that starts at the George Washington Bridge, heads north through New Jersey, continuing through Rockland and Orange counties in New York. The Palisades Parkway was built to allow for a direct route from New York City to Harriman State Park.

In New Jersey, the Garden State Parkway, connecting the northern part of the state with the Jersey Shore, is restricted to buses and non-commercial traffic north of the Route 18 interchange, but trucks are permitted south of this point. It is one of the busiest toll roads in the country.

In the Pittsburgh region, two of the major Interstates are referred to informally as parkways. The Parkway East (I-376, formally the Penn-Lincoln Parkway) connects Downtown Pittsburgh to Monroeville, Pennsylvania. The Parkway West (I-376) runs through the Fort Pitt Tunnel and links Downtown to Pittsburgh International Airport, southbound I-79, Imperial, Pennsylvania, and westbound US 22/US 30. The Parkway North (I-279) connects Downtown to Franklin Park, Pennsylvania and northbound I-79.

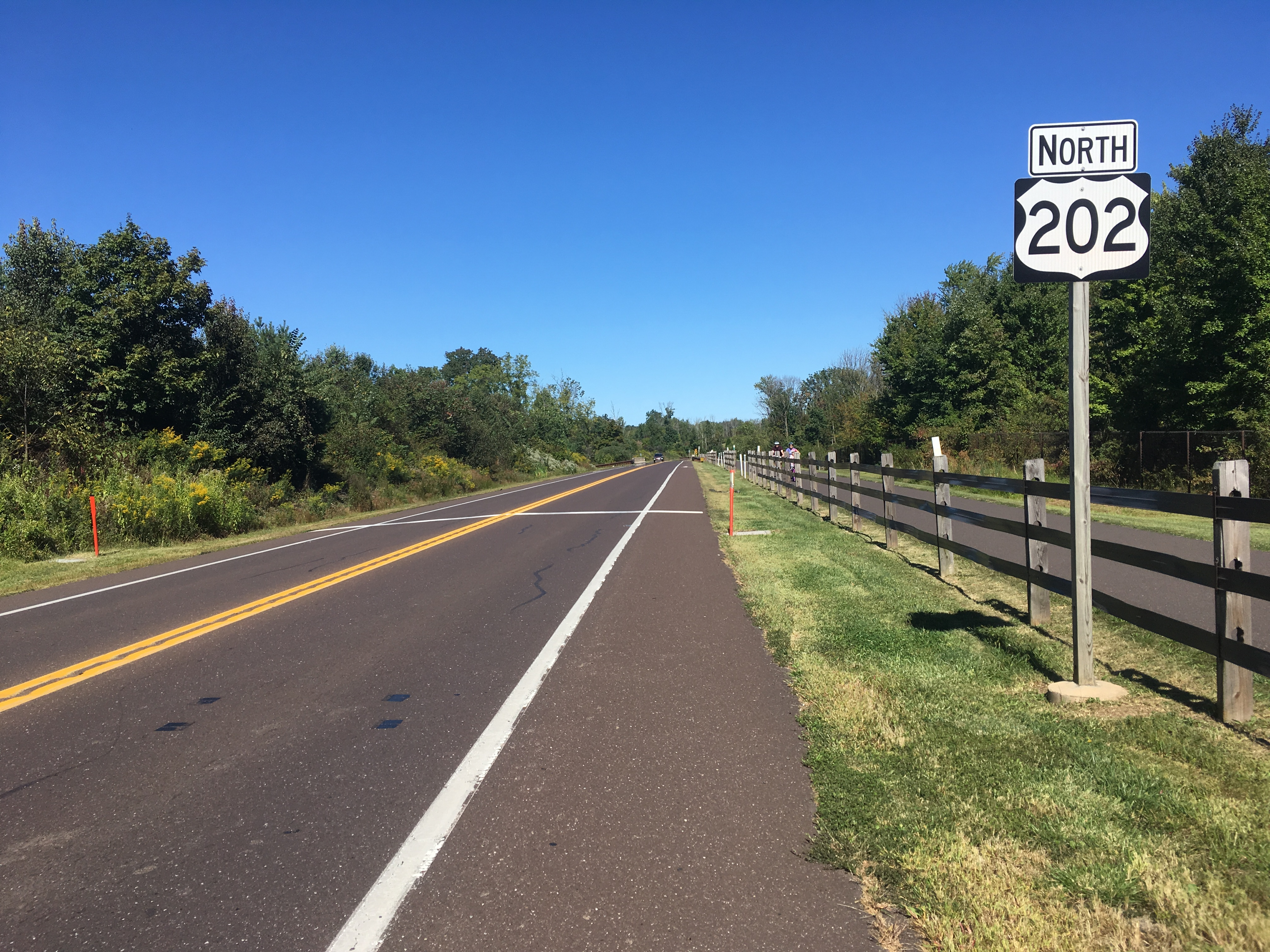
US 202 parkway northbound in Montgomery Township, Pennsylvania

In the suburbs of Philadelphia, U.S. Route 202 follows an at-grade parkway alignment known as the "U.S. Route 202 Parkway" between Montgomeryville and Doylestown. The parkway varies from two to four lanes in width, has 5-foot-wide (1.5 m) shoulders, a 12-foot-wide (3.7 m) walking path called the US 202 Parkway Trail on the side, and a 40 mph (64 km/h) speed limit. The parkway opened in 2012 as a bypass of a section of US 202 between the two towns; it had originally been proposed as a four-lane freeway before funding for the road was cut.

In Minneapolis, the Grand Rounds Scenic Byway system has 50 miles (80 km) of streets designated as parkways. These are not freeways; they have a slow 25-mile-per-hour (40 km/h) speed limit, pedestrian crossings, and stop signs.

In Cincinnati, parkways are major roads which trucks are prohibited from using. Some Cincinnati parkways, such as Columbia Parkway, are high-speed, limited-access roads, while others, such as Central Parkway, are multi-lane urban roads without controlled access. Columbia Parkway carries US-50 traffic from downtown towards east-side suburbs of Mariemont, Anderson, and Milford, and is a limited access road from downtown to the Village of Mariemont.

In Boston, parkways are generally four to six lanes wide but are not usually controlled-access. They are highly trafficked in most cases, transporting people between neighborhoods quicker than a typical city street. Many of them serve as principal arterials and some (like Storrow Drive, Memorial Drive, the Alewife Brook Parkway and the VFW Parkway) have evolved into regional commuter routes.

== Canada ==
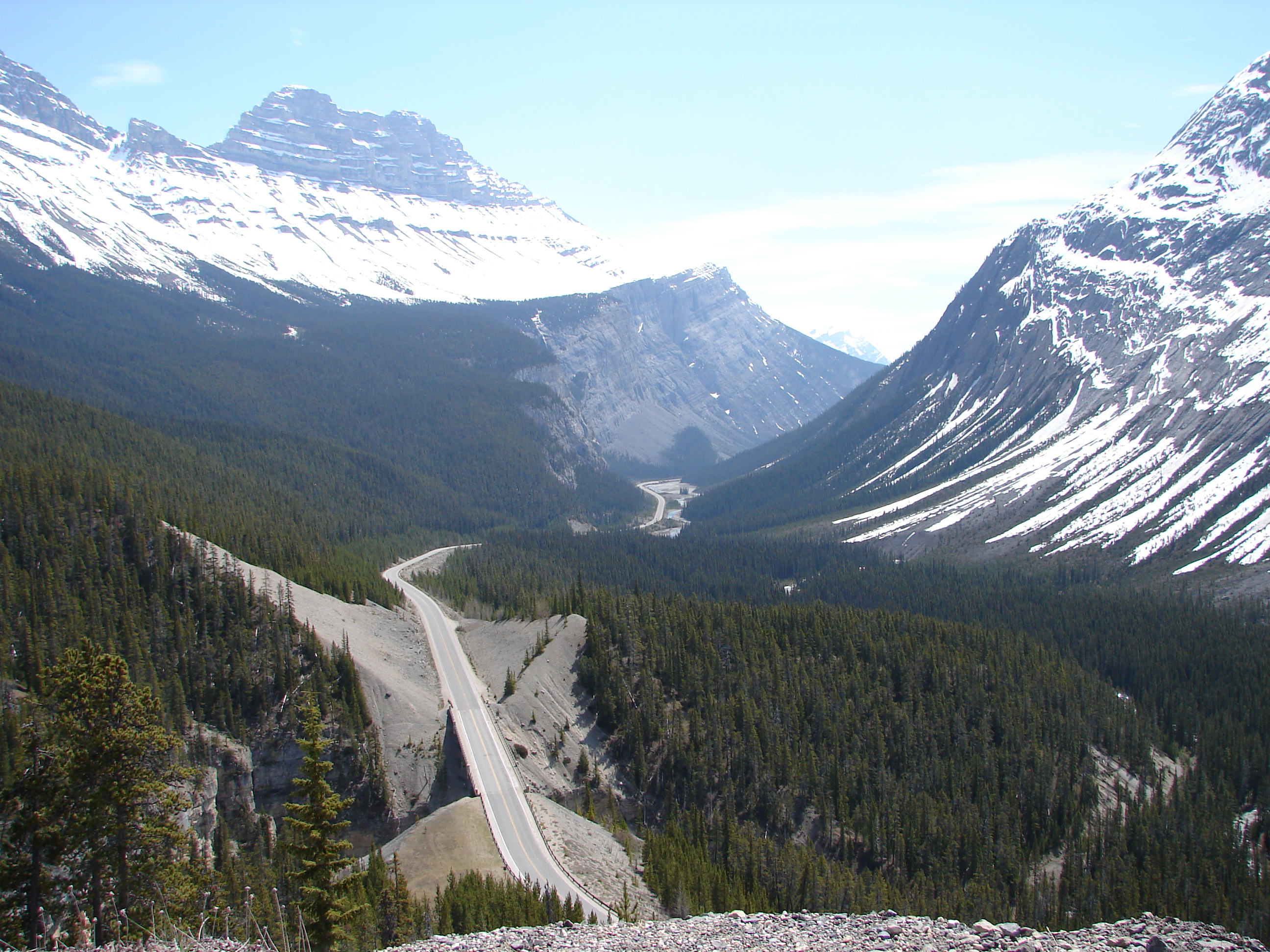
The Icefields Parkway runs through the Canadian Rockies in Jasper National Park and Banff National Park.

"Parkway" is used in the names of many Canadian roads, including major routes through national parks, scenic drives, major urban thoroughfares, and even regular freeways that carry commercial traffic.

Parkways in the National Capital Region are administered by the National Capital Region (Canada). However, some of them are named "drive" or "driveway".

The term in Canada is also applied to multi-use paths and greenways used by walkers and cyclists.

- Airport Parkway (Ottawa)
- Aviation Parkway (Ottawa)
- Broad Street in Saint John, New Brunswick
- Colonel By Drive in Ottawa, Ontario
- Conestoga Parkway in Kitchener, Ontario
- Don Valley Parkway in Toronto, Ontario
- Emil Kolb Parkway in Bolton, Ontario
- Erin Mills Parkway in Mississauga, Ontario
- Forest Hills Parkway in Cole Harbour, Nova Scotia
- Hanlon Expressway in Guelph, Ontario
- Icefields Parkway in Alberta
- Island Park Drive in Ottawa, Ontario
- Lauzon Parkway in Windsor, Ontario
- Lincoln M. Alexander Parkway in Hamilton, Ontario
- Niagara Parkway in Southern Ontario
- Ojibway Parkway in Windsor, Ontario
- Queen Elizabeth Driveway in Ottawa, Ontario
- Red Hill Valley Parkway in Hamilton, Ontario
- The Parkway in St. John's, Newfoundland and Labrador
- Thousand Islands Parkway in Eastern Ontario

== United Kingdom ==
In the United Kingdom, the term "parkway" more commonly refers to park and ride railway stations, where this is often indicated as part of the name, as with Bristol Parkway, the first such station, opened in 1972.

Luton Airport Parkway is somewhat analogous - an interconnect railway station with an airport via a public transport shuttle (initially buses, now the Luton DART light railway).

Parkways fitting the definition applied in this article also exist, as listed in this section.

=== Peterborough ===
The city of Peterborough has roads branded as "parkways" which provide routes for much through traffic and local traffic. The majority are dual carriageways, with many of their junctions numbered. Five main parkways form an orbital outer ring road. Three parkways serve settlements.

=== Plymouth ===
In the City of Plymouth, the A38 is called "The Parkway" and bisects a rural belt of the local authority area, which coincides with the geographical centre; it has two junctions to enter the downtown part of the city.

== Australia ==
=== Australian Capital Territory ===
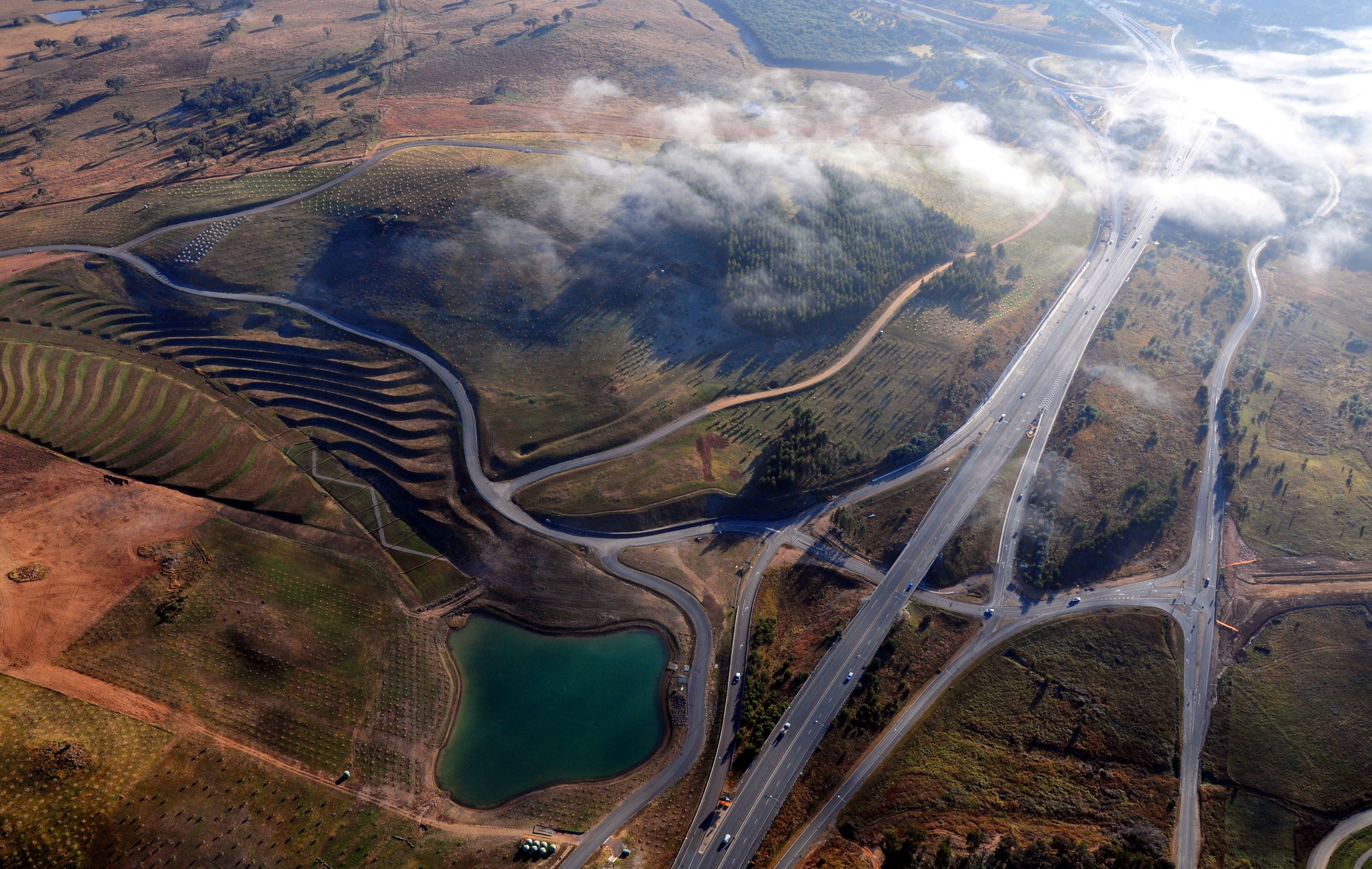
An aerial view of Tuggeranong Parkway

The Australian Capital Territory uses the term "parkway" to refer to roadways of a standard approximately equivalent to what would be designated as an "expressway", "freeway", or "motorway" in other areas. Parkways generally have multiple lanes in each direction of travel, no intersections (crossroads are accessed by interchanges), high speed limits, and are of dual carriageway design (or have high crash barriers on the median).

=== Victoria ===
Victoria uses the term "parkway" to sometimes refer to smaller local access roads that travel through parkland. Unlike other uses of the term, these parkways are not high-speed routes but may still have some degree of limited access.

== Other countries ==
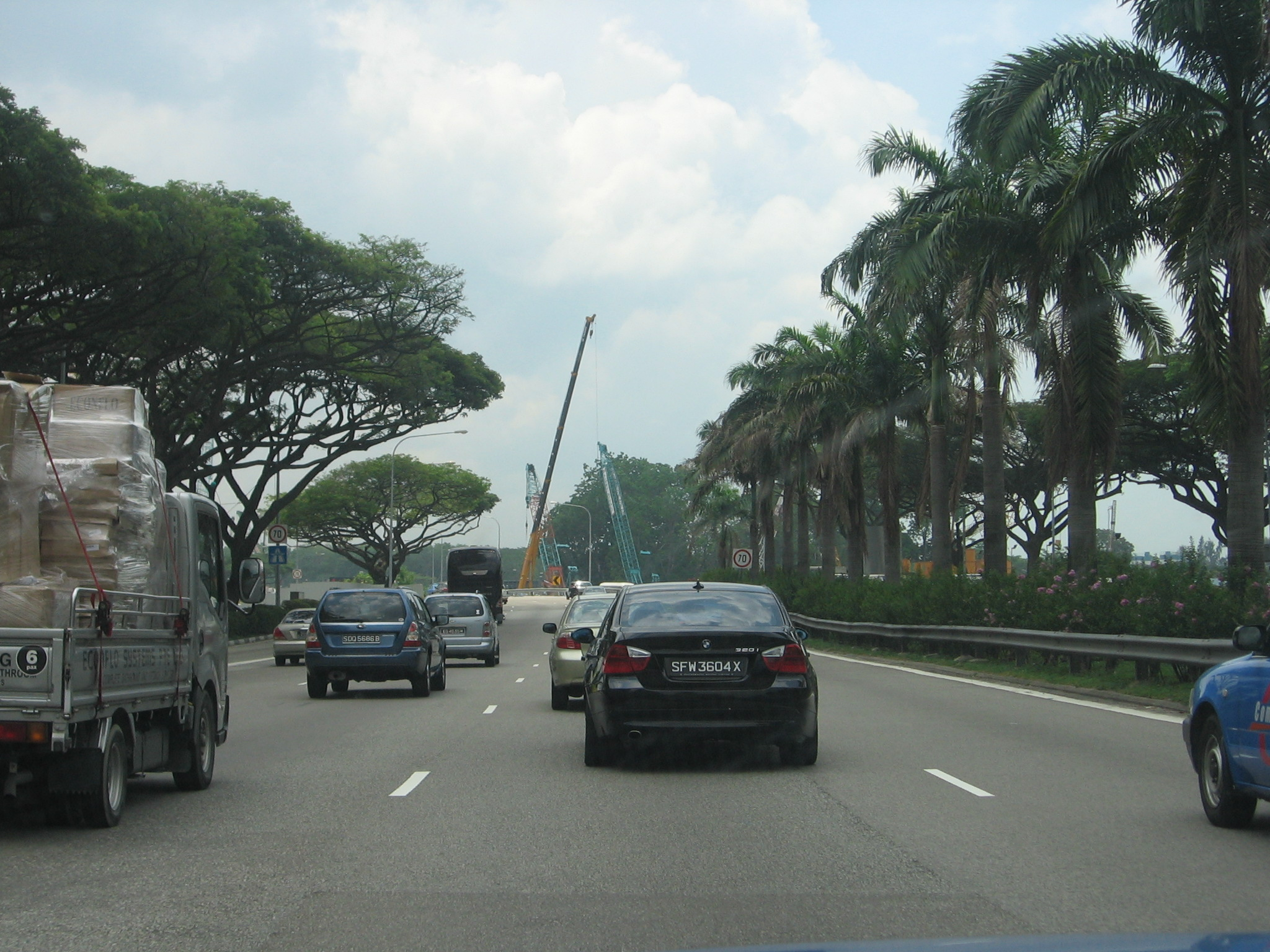
Singapore East Coast Parkway

Singapore uses the term "parkway" as an alternative to "expressway". As such, parkways are also dual carriageways with high speed limits and interchanges. The East Coast Parkway is currently the only expressway in Singapore that uses this terminology.

In Russia, long, broad (multi-lane) and beautified thoroughfares are referred to as prospekts.

== See also ==
- Central reservation
- Green belt
- Linear park
- Park
- Road verge
