= Bronson Avenue =

Street in Ottawa, Canada

- "Ottawa Road 79"
- Map of Bronson Avenue
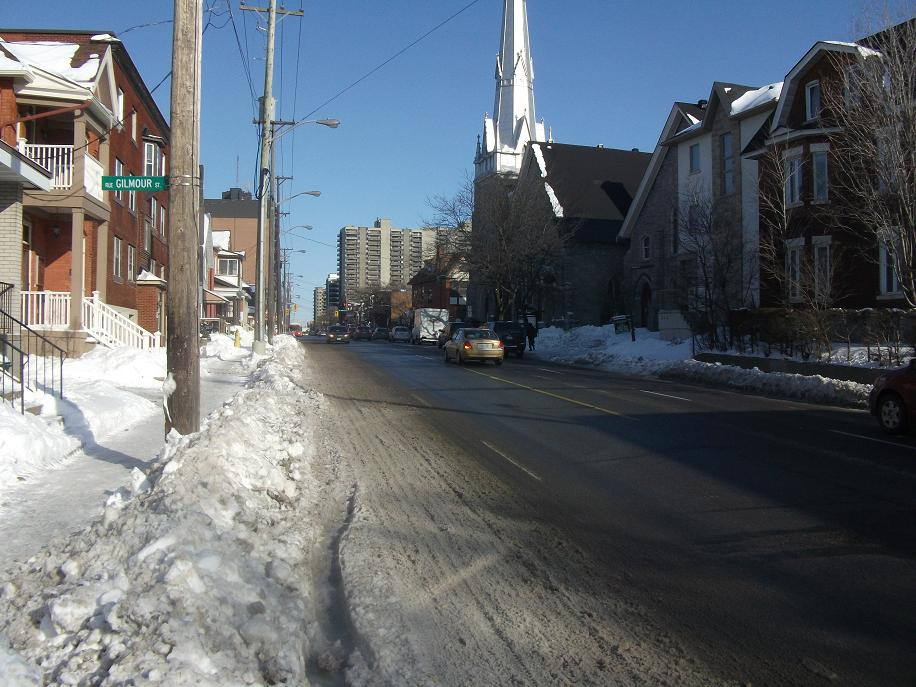
- Bronson Avenue looking north from Gilmour St

Route information
- Maintained by City of Ottawa
- Length: 5 km (3.1 mi)

Major junctions
- North end: Sparks Street
- South end: Continues as Airport Parkway

Location
- Country: Canada
- Province: Ontario
- Major cities: Ottawa

Highway system
- Roads in Ontario

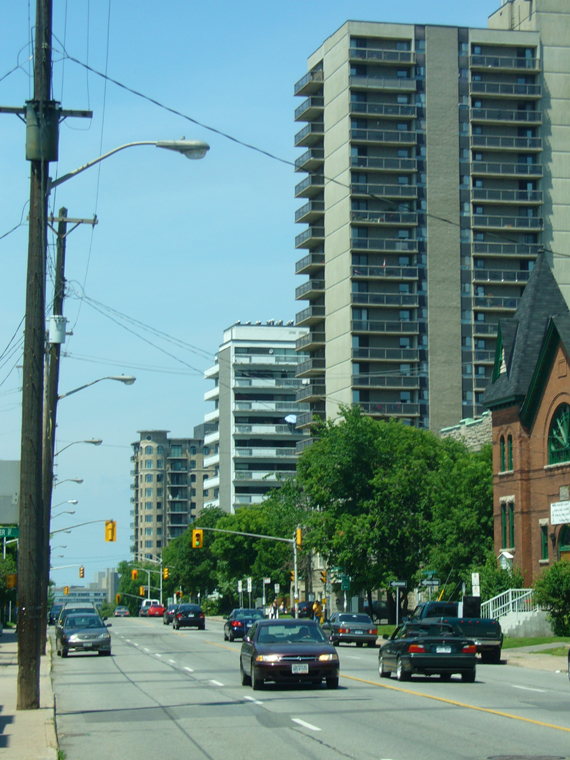
View of Bronson Avenue from Somerset Street looking northward.

Bronson Avenue (Ottawa Road #79) is a major north-south arterial road in Ottawa, Ontario, Canada. It starts at the south end as a continuation of the Airport Parkway, which is an expressway to the Macdonald-Cartier International Airport. It continues past Carleton University, the Glebe, north through Centretown, and ends downtown at Sparks Street.

Starting as an expressway leading from the Airport Parkway, Bronson quickly becomes a six lane divided principal arterial with little or no direct frontage and a speed limit of 70 km/h (43 mph). From Colonel By Drive, Bronson Avenue continues as a four-lane undivided principal arterial road through residential and commercial areas with a speed limit of 50 km/h (31 mph). Upon reaching Albert Street, Bronson ends as a local road for downtown residents.

Bronson Avenue is a gateway to the southern neighbourhoods of Ottawa and since it is generally faster to take Bronson Avenue than Bank Street, the street is usually quite busy, particularly at rush hour.

Glebe Collegiate Institute and Carleton University border on Bronson Avenue.

There has been considerable debate about the nature of the road in the past few years; some have called for an expressway to be built in the corridor to link to a twinned Airport Parkway; but that has been extremely unpopular with local residents calling for improved public transit and is unlikely to be built.

Bronson Avenue took its name from Ottawa businessman and politician (Ontario MLA) Erskine Henry Bronson.

== Neighbourhoods ==
Bronson Avenue is considered a boundary line for several Ottawa neighbourhoods:

- Centretown
- Centretown West
- The Glebe
- Old Ottawa South
- Chinatown, Ottawa

== Major intersections ==
Major intersections (from south to north):

- Start as a continuation of Airport Parkway - 0.0 km
- Sunnyside Avenue - 0.9 km
- Colonel By Drive - 1.3 km
- Carling Avenue - 2.2 km
- Highway 417 - 2.6 km
- Catherine Street - 2.7 km
- Gladstone Avenue - 3.0 km
- Somerset Street - 3.4 km
- Slater Street - 3.9 km
- Albert Street - 4.0 km
- Ends at Sparks Street - 4.1 km

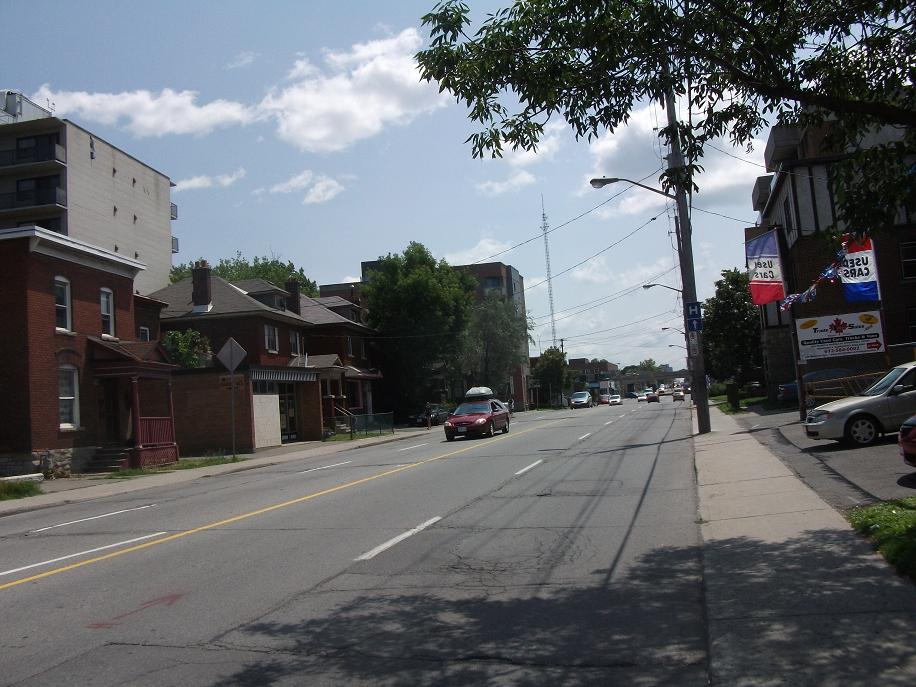
View of Bronson Avenue looking south from McLeod.

== Points of interest ==
- Bronson Centre
- Carleton University
