= Colonel By Drive =

Scenic parkway in Ottawa, Ontario, Canada

- Colonel By Drive highlighted in red
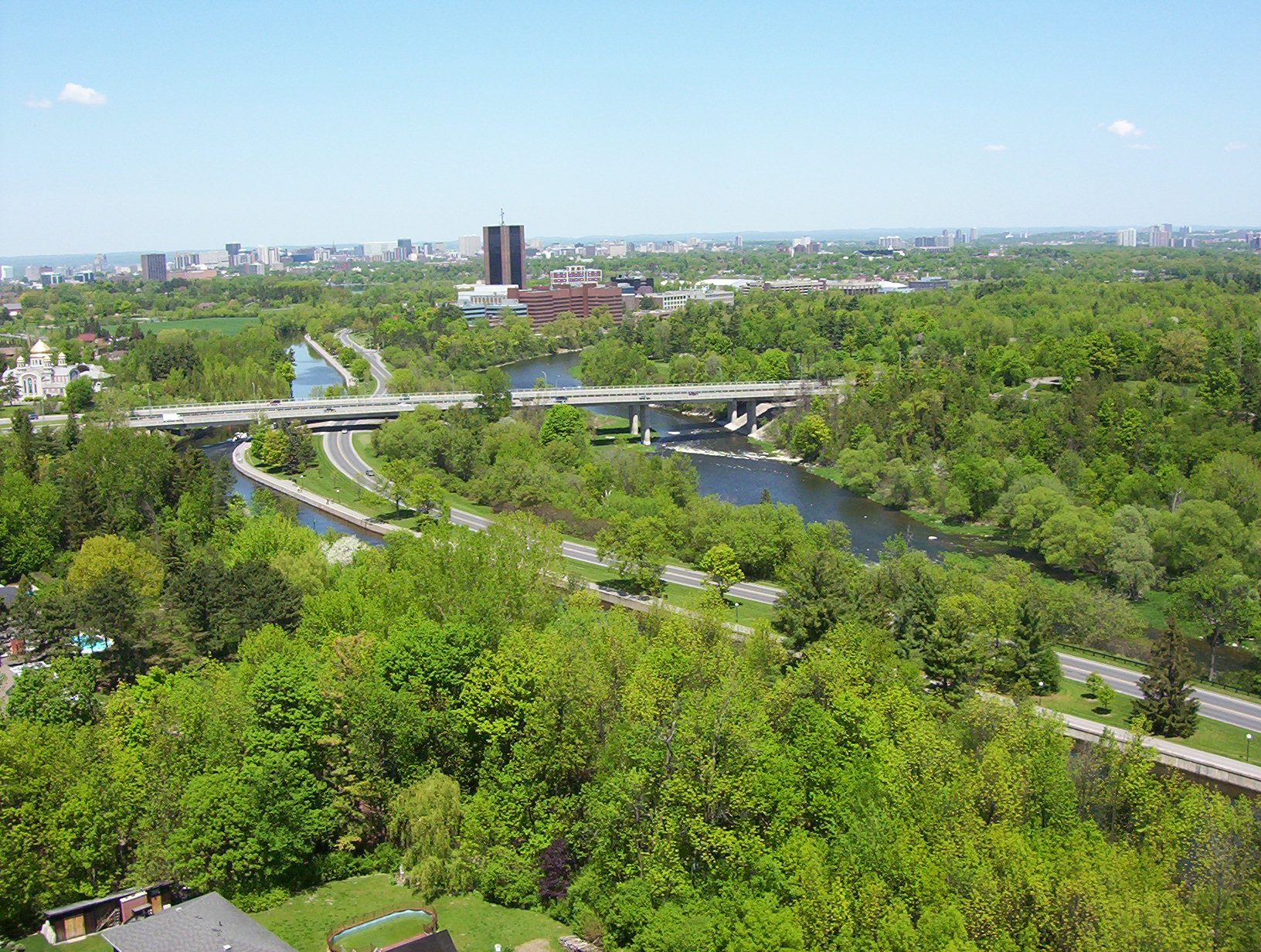
- Looking north towards Heron Road Workers Memorial Bridge

Route information
- Maintained by National Capital Commission
- Length: 8.1 km (5.0 mi)

Major junctions
- South end: Hog's Back Road
- North end: Sussex Drive

Location
- Country: Canada
- Province: Ontario
- Major cities: Ottawa

Highway system
- NCC parkways in Ottawa
(in alphabetical order)
← Aviation Parkway	Colonel By Drive	Island Park Drive →

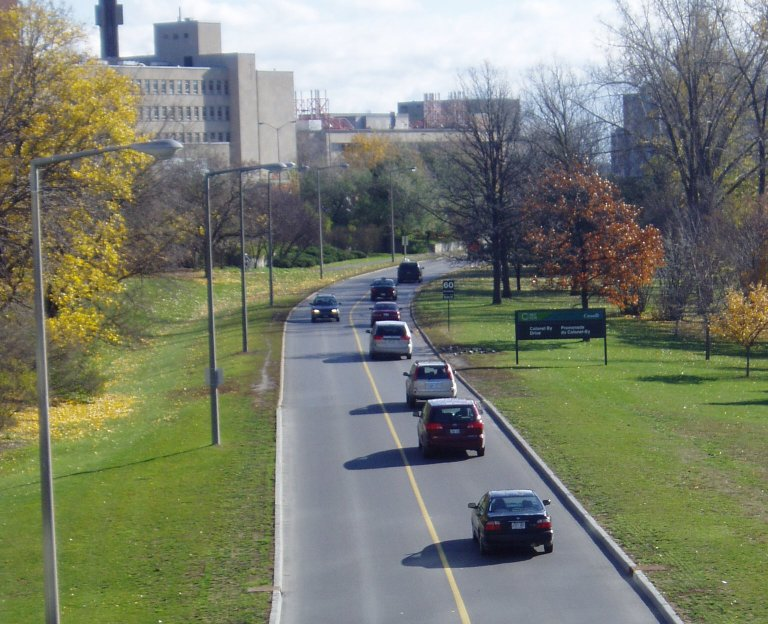
Colonel By Drive shown just south of the Laurier Avenue Bridge

Colonel By Drive (French: Promenade Colonel-By) is an 8.1 km (5.0 mi) long scenic parkway in Ottawa, Ontario, Canada.

== Route description ==
The parkway runs along the Rideau Canal from the end of Sussex Drive at Rideau Street. It then continues 8 km (5.0 mi) south and west to Hog's Back Road, winding through several residential areas and going past Dow's Lake and Carleton University. To the north, the road passes Department of National Defence Headquarters, the Ottawa Congress Centre and the Westin Hotel before ending at Rideau Street. The rear door of the Senate of Canada Building can be accessed from the street as well, after it passes under the Mackenzie King Bridge.

== History ==
It is named for Lieutenant-Colonel John By, who supervised the construction of the Rideau Canal. The winding two-lane road had a speed limit of 60 km/h (37 mph) for its entire length, until in 2022 the stretch from Bronson Avenue to Daly Avenue was reduced to 40 km/h (25 mph).

For many decades the area east of the canal had held Ottawa's main rail lines connecting to the Ottawa Union Station near the northern end of the canal. In 1966, rail service was controversially relocated to the new Ottawa Station about 3 km (1.9 mi) southeast in an industrial area in the east end of the city as part of an urban renewal plan, leaving the area on the eastern bank of the canal open for development. The Colonel By Drive was built in part on this newly-available rail right-of-way. The Queen Elizabeth Driveway, another scenic Canadian parkway, already served the same purpose on the other side of the canal.

Historically, like other National Capital Commission parkways, Colonel By Drive has been periodically closed to motor vehicle traffic and reserved for active transportation use. In 2021, the stretch between Canal Woods Terrace and Daly Avenue was closed from July 2 to September 6 for this reason. However, as of 2024, Colonel By Drive is not included in this active transportation program.
