= Queen Elizabeth Driveway =

Scenic parkway in Ottawa, Ontario, Canada

- Queen Elizabeth Driveway highlighted in red
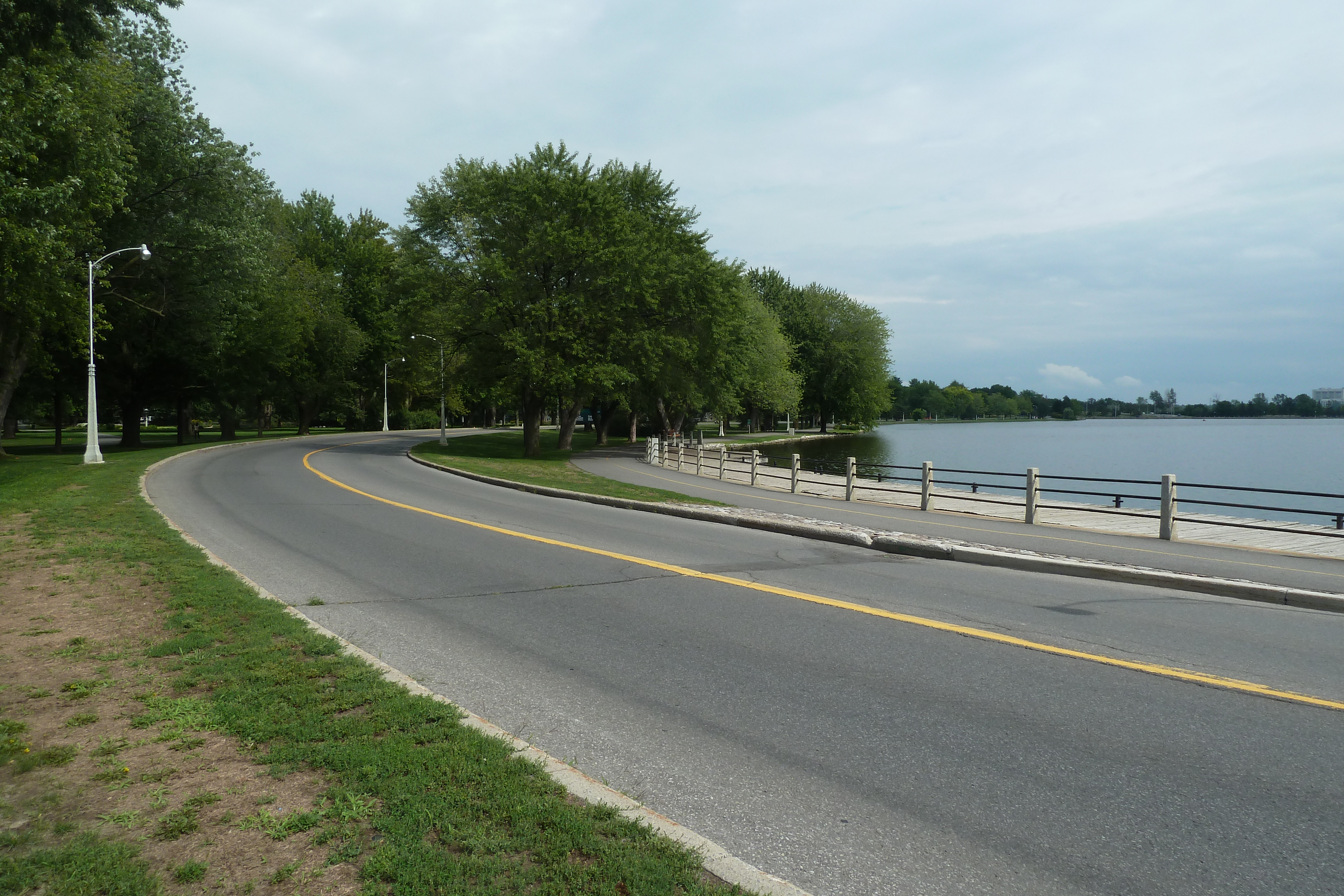
- Looking east along Dow's Lake

Route information
- Maintained by National Capital Commission
- Length: 5.7 km (3.5 mi)

Major junctions
- South end: Preston Avenue
- North end: Laurier Avenue

Location
- Country: Canada
- Province: Ontario
- Major cities: Ottawa

Highway system
- NCC parkways in Ottawa
(in alphabetical order)
| ← Kichi Zibi Mikan | Queen Elizabeth Driveway | Sir George-Étienne Cartier Parkway → |

Queen Elizabeth Driveway is a scenic parkway in Ottawa, Ontario, Canada.

== Route description ==
The parkway runs along the western edge of the Rideau Canal, from Laurier Avenue in the north to Dow's Lake where it turns into Prince of Wales Drive at Preston Avenue. Along the entire length of the Drive is a multi-use trail as part of the Capital Pathway system.

== History ==
It is administered and owned by the National Capital Commission (NCC).

The parkway was one of the first projects of the NCC. The NCC replaced the Federal District Commission (FDC), which had been created in 1927, and the even earlier Ottawa Improvement Commission. The two-lane road replaced the industrial buildings and private boathouses that had stood along the canal. The drive was lined with trees and gardens, and a series of large houses were built along it. It was originally known as the Government Driveway but was soon renamed the Rideau Canal Driveway. Several decades later it was given its current name. The speed limit for most of its length is 60 km/h (37 mph).

In the 1950s a similar route was created on the eastern edge of the canal, the Colonel By Drive.

Portions of the parkway are regularly closed to vehicular traffic in the summer months for active use such as cycling. This sparked major debate in 2023, with city councilors and Ottawa mayor Mark Sutcliffe calling on the NCC to reopen the parkway to vehicular traffic in whole or in part, citing traffic and safety concerns. City of Ottawa data has shown that the closure of the parkway leads to increased traffic on O'Connor Street. Despite the pushback, the NCC has continued this initiative in 2024 and is exploring the feasibility of installing bicycle lanes on the parkway.

== See also ==
- Royal eponyms in Canada
