= Airport Parkway (Ottawa) =

Controlled-access highway in Ottawa

- "Ottawa Road 79"
- Map of Airport Parkway
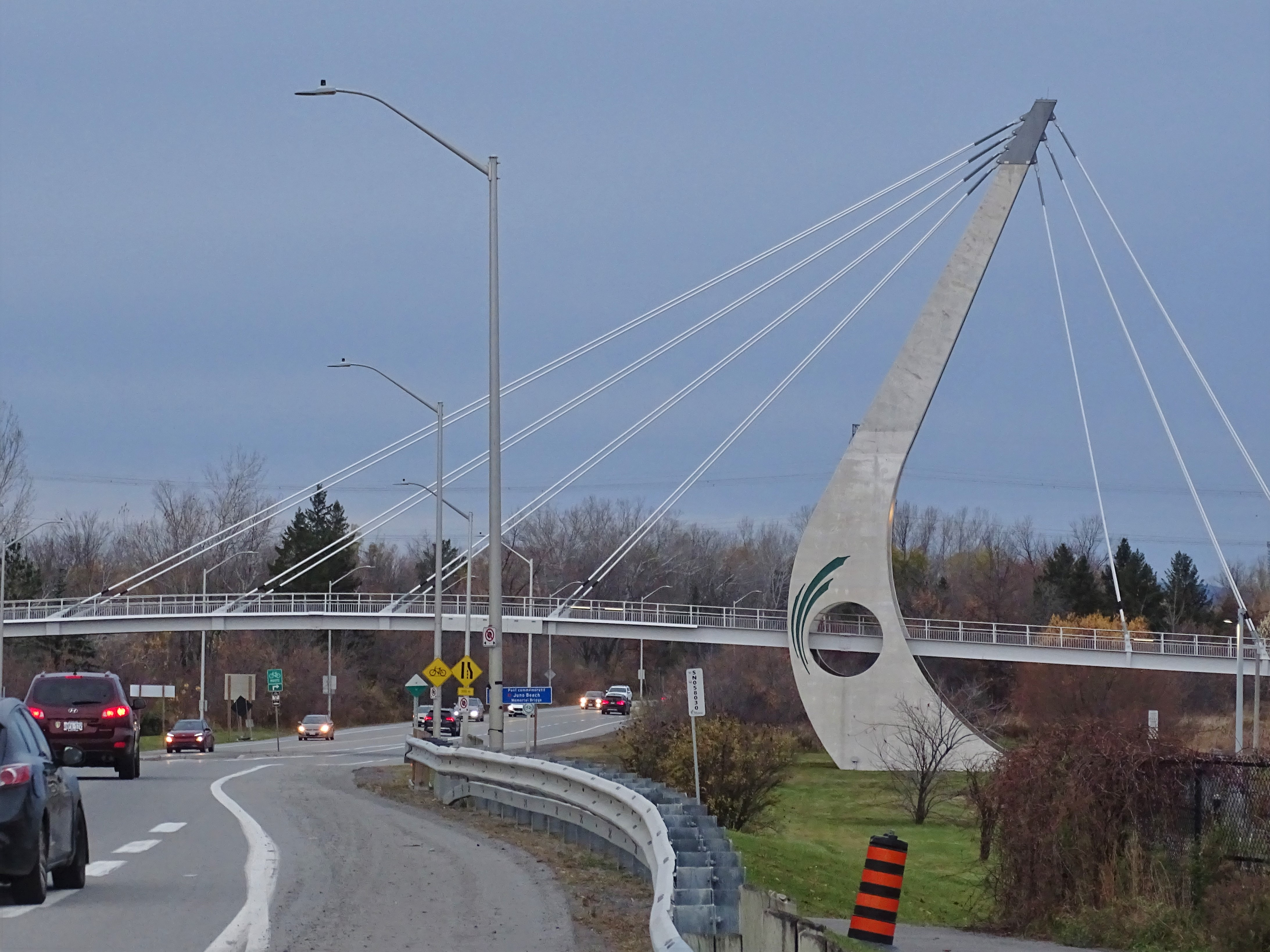
- Juno Beach Memorial Bridge over the Airport Parkway

Route information
- Maintained by City of Ottawa
- Length: 7 km (4.3 mi)

Major junctions
- South end: Ottawa Macdonald–Cartier International Airport
- North end: Continues as Bronson Avenue

Location
- Country: Canada
- Province: Ontario
- Major cities: Ottawa

Highway system
- Roads in Ontario
Ontario municipal expressways
(in alphabetical order)
Airport Parkway	Allen Road →

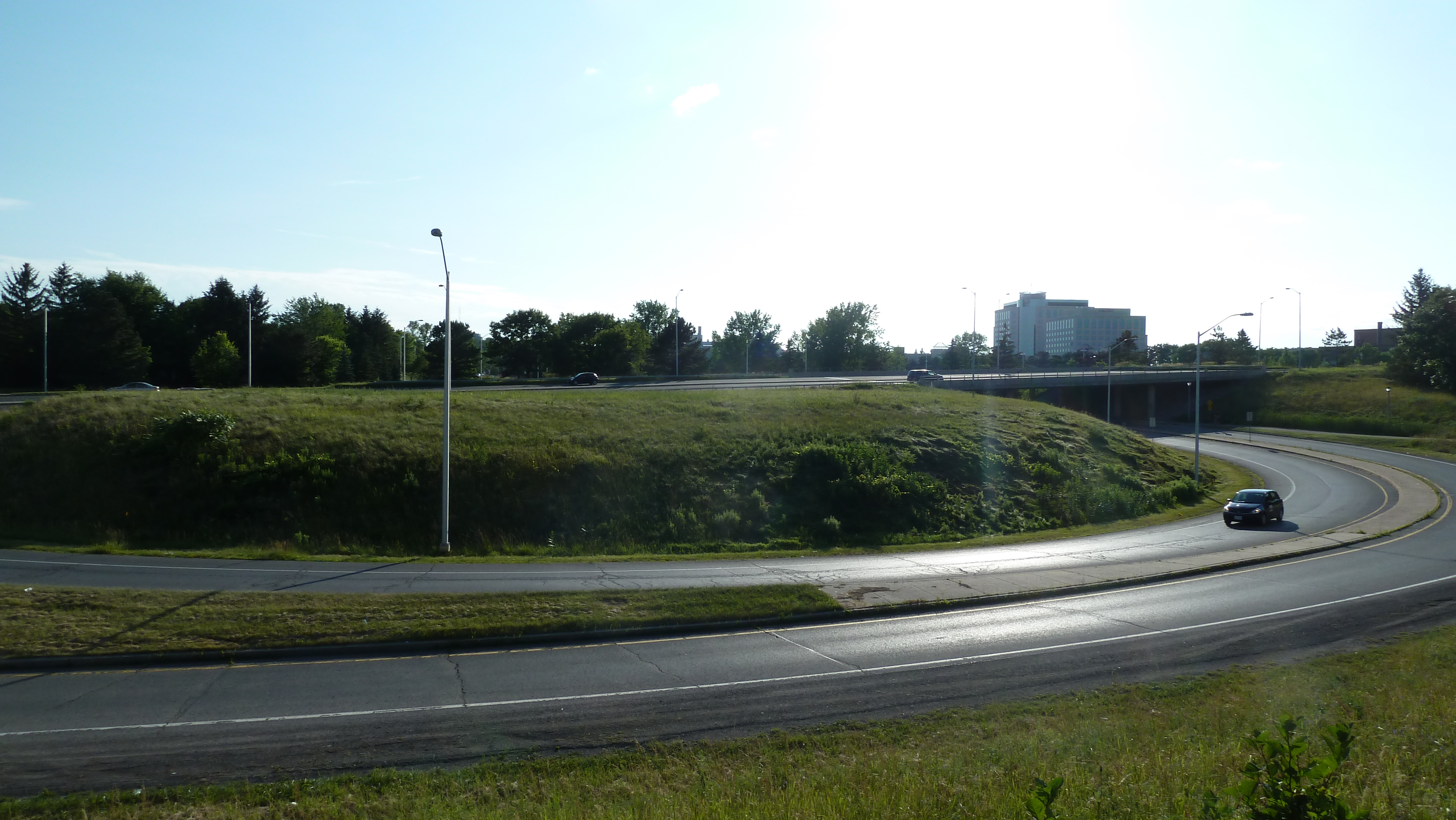
Brookfield Road exit

Airport Parkway (Ottawa Route 79) is a parkway and two-lane expressway in Ottawa, Ontario, Canada. It runs from the Ottawa Macdonald–Cartier International Airport to an interchange with Heron Road where it turns into Bronson Avenue.

== Route description ==
Airport Parkway is a two-lane expressway for most of its length, although since bicycles are permitted, it is not considered a controlled-access highway. It is home to one of Ontario's only two single-point urban interchanges at its Hunt Club Road exit. The speed limit is 80 km/h (50 mph) for its entire length.

Airport Parkway begins after leaving the airport, where it immediately interchanges with Lester Road and Uplands Drive. The parkway turns northwards and traverses through some forest before encountering Hunt Club Road, which it interchanges it with an single-point urban interchange (SPUI), one of only a handful in Canada. After that, the parkway passes under a pedestrian overpass and runs parallel to the Transitway. The parkway then meets Walkley Road with a partial interchange. After that, it is flanked by residential neighbourhoods before interchanging with Brookfield Road, and the parkway ends shortly after as it interchanges with Heron Road. The parkway continues as Bronson Avenue and loses its expressway status.

== History ==
Until 1997, Airport Parkway was maintained by the federal government of Canada under the jurisdiction of the National Capital Commission.

=== Juno Beach Memorial Bridge ===
The Juno Beach Memorial Bridge is a footbridge spanning the Airport Parkway just north of Hunt Club Road. It is an important link connecting communities west of the Parkway to the South Keys Shopping Centre and the South Keys bus station. Construction of the Juno Beach Memorial Bridge began in June 2011. After multiple delays due to material and design flaws, the bridge opened 3 years behind schedule and $5.5 million over budget in November 2014. It was officially named in November 2019.

== Future ==
The road has had 300 collisions and three fatalities since 2000, making it the focus of future improvements. There has been some discussing in twinning it to a four-lane expressway or freeway, although those discussions have stalled due to local controversy.

== Exit list ==
The following is a list of exits along Airport Parkway. Some exits on Bronson Avenue are also included.
