= Ottawa—Vanier—Gloucester =

Federal electoral district in Ontario, Canada

Ontario electoral district
- Interactive map of riding boundaries from the 2025 federal election
- Coordinates: 45°26′N 75°39′W

Federal electoral district
- Legislature: House of Commons
MP
Mona Fortier
Liberal
- District created: 1933
- First contested: 1935
- Last contested: 2021
- District webpage: profile, map

Demographics
- Population (2011): 110,999
- Electors (2015): 82,040
- Area (km²): 41
- Pop. density (per km²): 2,707.3
- Census division: Ottawa
- Census subdivision: Ottawa (part)

Ottawa—Vanier—Gloucester (formerly known as Ottawa—Vanier and Ottawa East) is a federal electoral district in Ontario, Canada, that has been represented in the House of Commons of Canada since 1935. Previous to that date, it was part of the Ottawa electoral district that returned two members.

The riding, with a large Franco-Ontarian population in Vanier, is one of the most solidly Liberal in the country, having elected Liberals both federally and provincially in every election since its creation. In fact, the previous electoral district which comprises most of the constituency, Russell, had been solidly Liberal since 1887. The riding is home to many civil servants.

== Geography ==
The riding generally corresponds to the wards of Beacon Hill-Cyrville, Rideau-Rockcliffe and Rideau-Vanier, plus the neighbourhood of Blackburn Hamlet.

== Political geography ==
About 15% of the riding is in the former city of Vanier, which was amalgamated into Ottawa in 2001. Vanier has long been home to much of Ottawa's francophone population, a group that has traditionally been solidly Liberal. The riding also contains the wealthiest part of Ottawa, the former village Rockcliffe Park, which has supported both the Conservatives, and the Liberals in recent elections. The anglophone middle class neighbourhoods of Sandy Hill, containing the University of Ottawa, and New Edinburgh also tend to vote Liberal, but with significant support for the New Democratic Party. In 2011, the NDP won Sandy Hill, Lower Town, Vanier and in Overbrook. The Conservatives won in the more suburban parts of the riding like in Beacon Hill and Pineview.

== Demographics ==
According to the 2021 Canadian census, 2023 representation

Race: 62.9% White, 14.1% Black, 5.0% Arab, 3.7% Indigenous, 3.5% South Asian, 2.7% Chinese, 1.8% Latin American, 1.6% Filipino, 1.5% West Asian
Languages: 54.0% English, 27.9% French, 4.1% Arabic, 1.9% Spanish, 1.2% Mandarin
Religions: 54.1% Christian (33.7% Catholic, 3.2% Anglican, 2.1% United Church, 1.7% Christian Orthodox, 1.2% Pentecostal, 12.2% other), 9.2% Muslim, 32.7% none
Median income: $43,200 (2020)
Average income: $57,800 (2020)

== Riding associations ==
Riding associations are the local branches of national political parties:

The list of registered riding associations is available from Elections Canada.

Party	Association name	President	HQ City
Conservative	Ottawa--Vanier--Gloucester Conservative Association	Josiah Martinoski	North Glengarry
Green	Ottawa--Vanier--Gloucester Green Party Association	Sarah Gabrielle Baron	Ottawa
Liberal	Ottawa--Vanier--Gloucester Federal Liberal Association	Michael Mclellan	Ottawa
New Democratic	Ottawa--Vanier--Gloucester Federal NDP Riding Association	Phoebe Chuxin Qiao	Ottawa

== History ==
The federal riding was created as "Ottawa East" in 1933 from parts of Ottawa and Russell ridings.

It initially consisted of, in the city of Ottawa, Rideau, Ottawa, By, St. Georges wards and the northeast part of Riverdale Ward, the town of Eastview, and the village of Rockcliffe Park.

In 1947, it was redefined to exclude the town of Eastview. In 1952, it was redefined to consist of the village of Rockcliffe Park, and the eastern parts of the city of Ottawa. In 1966, it was redefined to include the City of Eastview and exclude the village of Rockcliffe Park.

The name of the electoral district was changed in 1973 to "Ottawa—Vanier".

In 1976, it was redefined to consist of the City of Vanier, and the eastern parts of the city of Ottawa. In 1987, it was redefined to consist of the City of Vanier, the eastern part of the city of Ottawa, part of the city of Gloucester and the Village of Rockcliffe Park. In 1996, the Ottawa and Gloucester parts of the riding were redefined.

In 2003, it was redefined as the part of the City of Ottawa east and north of a line running south along the Rideau Canal from the interprovincial boundary to Mann Avenue, northeast to Nicholas Street, southeast to Highway 417, and east to the abandoned Canadian Pacific Railway to the hydroelectric transmission line, north to Innes Road, northeast to Blair Road, northwest to Montreal Road, east and northeast to Regional Road 174, northeast to Green's Creek, north to the Ottawa River.

Following the Canadian federal electoral redistribution, 2012, the riding gained the neighbourhood of Beacon Hill South from Ottawa—Orléans.

The riding became vacant because of the death of incumbent MP Mauril Bélanger on August 16, 2016. Mona Fortier was elected in the byelection to fill the seat on April 3, 2017.

Following the 2022 Canadian federal electoral redistribution, the riding was renamed Ottawa—Vanier—Gloucester, which came into effect upon the calling of the 2025 Canadian federal election. It gained Blackburn Hamlet from Orléans and lost a small territory south of Innes Road to Prescott—Russell—Cumberland. The new name refers to the Gloucester area.

=== Members of Parliament ===
This riding has elected the following members of Parliament:

Parliament	Years	Member	Party
Ottawa East; Riding created from Ottawa and Russell
18th	1935–1936	Edgar-Rodolphe-Eugène Chevrier	Liberal
18th	1936–1940	Joseph-Albert Pinard	Liberal
19th	1940–1945	Joseph-Albert Pinard	Liberal
20th	1945–1949	Jean-Thomas Richard	Liberal
21st	1949–1953	Jean-Thomas Richard	Liberal
22nd	1953–1957	Jean-Thomas Richard	Liberal
23rd	1957–1958	Jean-Thomas Richard	Liberal
24th	1958–1962	Jean-Thomas Richard	Liberal
25th	1962–1963	Jean-Thomas Richard	Liberal
26th	1963–1965	Jean-Thomas Richard	Liberal
27th	1965–1968	Jean-Thomas Richard	Liberal
28th	1968–1972	Jean-Thomas Richard	Liberal
29th	1972–1974	Jean-Robert Gauthier	Liberal
Ottawa—Vanier
30th	1974–1979	Jean-Robert Gauthier	Liberal
31st	1979–1980	Jean-Robert Gauthier	Liberal
32nd	1980–1984	Jean-Robert Gauthier	Liberal
33rd	1984–1988	Jean-Robert Gauthier	Liberal
34th	1988–1993	Jean-Robert Gauthier	Liberal
35th	1993–1994	Jean-Robert Gauthier	Liberal
35th	1995–1997	Mauril Bélanger	Liberal
36th	1997–2000	Mauril Bélanger	Liberal
37th	2000–2004	Mauril Bélanger	Liberal
38th	2004–2006	Mauril Bélanger	Liberal
39th	2006–2008	Mauril Bélanger	Liberal
40th	2008–2011	Mauril Bélanger	Liberal
41st	2011–2015	Mauril Bélanger	Liberal
42nd	2015–2016	Mauril Bélanger	Liberal
42nd	2017–2019	Mona Fortier	Liberal
43rd	2019–2021	Mona Fortier	Liberal
44th	2021–2025	Mona Fortier	Liberal
Ottawa—Vanier—Gloucester
45th	2025–present	Mona Fortier	Liberal

== Election results ==
Graph of election results in Ottawa—Vanier/Ottawa East (since 1940, minor parties that never got 2% of the vote or didn't run consistently are omitted) View source data.

=== Ottawa—Vanier—Gloucester ===
Ottawa—Vanier incumbent Liberal MP Mona Fortier is being challenged by Jagmeet Singh's former press secretary Tristan Oliff of the NDP, federal policy advisor Dean Wythe of the Conservatives, IT consultant Marty Simms of the People's Party and construction foreman Christian Proulx of the Greens.

2025 Canadian federal election
Party	Candidate	Votes	%	±%
Liberal	Mona Fortier	45,934	67.37	+18.37
Conservative	Dean Wythe	14,633	21.46	+0.93
New Democratic	Tristan Oliff	5,164	7.57	–15.69
Green	Christian Proulx	1,345	1.97	–1.07
People's	Marty Simms	349	0.51	–2.68
Libertarian	Coreen Corcoran	338	0.50	+0.10
Independent	Elizabeth Benoit	238	0.35	N/A
Marxist–Leninist	Christian Legeais	182	0.27	N/A
Total valid votes		68,183	98.98	
Total rejected ballots		705	1.02	+0.04
Turnout		68,888	69.34	+4.11
Eligible voters		99,345		
Liberal notional hold		Swing		+8.72
Source: Elections Canada

2021 federal election redistributed results
Party	Vote	%
Liberal	30,441	49.00
New Democratic	14,451	23.26
Conservative	12,757	20.54
People's	1,981	3.19
Green	1,892	3.05
Libertarian	248	0.40
Free	194	0.31
Independent	157	0.25
Total valid votes	62,121	99.02
Rejected ballots	615	0.98
Registered voters/ estimated turnout	96,177	65.23

=== Ottawa—Vanier ===
2021 Canadian federal election: Ottawa—Vanier
Party	Candidate	Votes	%	±%	Expenditures
Liberal	Mona Fortier	28,462	49.0	-2.2	$92,344.95
New Democratic	Lyse-Pascale Inamuco	13,703	23.6	+2.4	$38,377.14
Conservative	Heidi Jensen	11,611	20.0	+2.6	$16,774.67
People's	Jean-Jacques Desgranges	1,855	3.2	+1.5	$0.00
Green	Christian Proulx	1,816	3.1	-4.4	$8,354.08
Libertarian	Daniel Elford	248	0.4	–	$0.00
Free	Crystelle Bourguignon	179	0.3	–	$2.00
Independent	Marie-Chantal TaiEl Leriche	157	0.3	–	$0.00
Total valid votes/expense limit		58,031	–	–	$117,527.01
Total rejected ballots		576			
Turnout		58,607	65.80		
Eligible voters		89,069			
Source: Elections Canada

2019 Canadian federal election: Ottawa—Vanier
Party	Candidate	Votes	%	±%	Expenditures
Liberal	Mona Fortier	32,679	51.2	0	$76,159.78
New Democratic	Stéphanie Mercier	13,516	21.2	-7.5	none listed
Conservative	Joel Bernard	11,118	17.4	+2	$18,239.00
Green	Oriana Ngabirano	4,796	7.5	+4.2	$8,669.23
People's	Paul Durst	1,064	1.7		$6,338.44
Rhinoceros	Derek Miller	229	0.4		$0.00
Independent	Joel Altman	211	0.3		$281.93
Communist	Michelle Paquette	115	0.2		$496.90
Independent	Daniel James McHugh	94	0.1		$0.00
Marxist–Leninist	Christian Legeais	59	0.1		$0.00
Total valid votes/expense limit		63,881	100.0		
Total rejected ballots		699			
Turnout		64,580	71.0		
Eligible voters		91,015			
Liberal hold		Swing		+3.75	
Source: Elections Canada

Canadian federal by-election, April 3, 2017: Ottawa—Vanier Death of Mauril Bélanger
Party	Candidate	Votes	%	±%
Liberal	Mona Fortier	15,195	51.33	−6.24
New Democratic	Emilie Taman	8,557	28.91	+9.66
Conservative	Adrian Paul Papara	4,484	15.15	−3.96
Green	Nira Dookeran	999	3.37	+0.26
Independent	John Turmel	147	0.50	
Libertarian	Damien Wilson	122	0.41	−0.30
Independent	Christina Wilson	99	0.33	
Total valid votes/expense limit		29,603	100.0	–
Total rejected ballots		176	-	
Turnout		29,779		
Eligible voters		86,404		
Liberal hold		Swing		−7.91
Source: Elections Canada

2015 Canadian federal election
Party	Candidate	Votes	%	±%	Expenditures
Liberal	Mauril Bélanger	36,474	57.57	+19.47	$163,698.89
New Democratic	Emilie Taman	12,194	19.25	-9.43	$123,293.39
Conservative	David Piccini	12,109	19.11	-8.84	$74,698.91
Green	Nira Dookeran	1,947	3.07	-1.99	$8,775.54
Libertarian	Coreen Corcoran	503	0.79	–	$747.12
Marxist–Leninist	Christian Legeais	128	0.2	-0.03	–
Total valid votes/Expense limit		63,355	100.0		$219,479.72
Total rejected ballots		418	–	–	
Turnout		63,773	–	–	
Eligible voters		83,570			
Source: Elections Canada

2011 federal election redistributed results
Party	Vote	%
Liberal	21,417	38.10
New Democratic	16,126	28.68
Conservative	15,711	27.95
Green	2,843	5.06
Marxist–Leninist	122	0.22

2011 Canadian federal election
Party	Candidate	Votes	%	±%	Expenditures
Liberal	Mauril Bélanger	20,009	38.17	-8.03	
New Democratic	Trevor Haché	15,391	29.36	+12.30	
Conservative	Rem Westland	14,184	27.06	-0.22	
Green	Caroline Rioux	2,716	5.18	-3.40	
Marxist–Leninist	Christian Legeais	122	0.23	-0.02	
Total valid votes/Expense limit		52,422	100.00		
Total rejected ballots		316	0.60	+0.07	
Turnout		52,738	68.24	+4.20	

2008 Canadian federal election
Party	Candidate	Votes	%	±%	Expenditures
Liberal	Mauril Bélanger	23,948	46.20	+3.89	$79,668
Conservative	Patrick Glémaud	14,138	27.28	-1.39	$53,405
New Democratic	Trevor Haché	8,845	17.06	-4.75	$30,040
Green	Akbar Manoussi	4,447	8.58	+1.98	$3,842
Independent	Robert Larter	227	0.44	–	
Marxist–Leninist	Christian Legeais	130	0.25	+0.04	
Canadian Action	Michel St-Onge	100	0.19	–	$149
Total valid votes/Expense limit		51,835	100.00	$85,605	
Total rejected ballots		277	0.53		
Turnout		52,112	64.04		
Liberal hold		Swing	+2.64		

2006 Canadian federal election
Party	Candidate	Votes	%	±%
Liberal	Mauril Bélanger	23,567	42.31	-6.86
Conservative	Paul Benoit	15,970	28.67	+4.48
New Democratic	Ric Dagenais	12,145	21.81	+3.27
Green	Raphaël Thierrin	3,675	6.60	-0.27
Progressive Canadian	James C. Parsons	221	0.40	
Marxist–Leninist	Alexandre Legeais	117	0.21	-0.28
Total valid votes		55,695	100.00	
Liberal hold		Swing	-5.67	

2004 Canadian federal election
Party	Candidate	Votes	%	±%
Liberal	Mauril Bélanger	25,952	49.17	-6.40
Conservative	Kevin Friday	12,769	24.19	-6.95
New Democratic	Ric Dagenais	9,787	18.54	+9.83
Green	Raphaël Thierrin	3,628	6.87	+4.62
Marijuana	Carol Taylor	558	1.06	-0.45
Marxist–Leninist	Françoise Roy	85	0.49	+0.34
Total valid votes		52,779	100.00	

Note: Conservative vote is compared to the total of the Canadian Alliance vote and Progressive Conservative vote in 2000 election.

2000 Canadian federal election
Party	Candidate	Votes	%	±%
Liberal	Mauril Bélanger	26,749	55.57	-6.30
Alliance	Nestor Gayowsky	7,590	15.77	+5.97
Progressive Conservative	Stephen Woollcombe	7,400	15.37	+1.77
New Democratic	Joseph Zebrowski	4,194	8.71	-3.28
Green	Adam Sommerfeld	1,083	2.25	+0.94
Marijuana	Raymond Turmel	728	1.51	
Natural Law	Pierrette Blondin	187	0.39	-0.27
Canadian Action	Raymond Samuéls	131	0.27	
Marxist–Leninist	Kim Roberge	74	0.15	-0.13
Total valid votes		48,136	100.00	

Note: Canadian Alliance vote is compared to the Reform vote in 1997 election.

1997 Canadian federal election
Party	Candidate	Votes	%	±%
Liberal	Mauril Bélanger	30,728	61.87	+1.14
Progressive Conservative	Luc Edmund Barrick	6,754	13.60	+3.92
New Democratic	David Gagnon	5,952	11.99	+5.57
Reform	Roy Grant	4,868	9.80	-10.76
Green	Richard Guy Briggs	651	1.31	
Natural Law	Roger Bouchard	330	0.66	+0.10
Independent	César Antonio Bello	241	0.49	
Marxist–Leninist	Robert Rival	138	0.28	-0.03
Total valid votes		49,662	100.00	

Canadian federal by-election, February 13, 1995: Ottawa—Vanier
Party	Candidate	Votes	%	±%	Expenditures
Liberal	Mauril Bélanger	11,918	60.06	−10.41	$52,001
Reform	Kevin Gaudet	4,034	20.33	+12.44	$36,995
Progressive Conservative	Françoise Guenette	1,899	9.57	−0.96	$30,933
New Democratic Party	Bob Lawson	1,259	6.34	−0.16	$5,764
Christian Heritage	Gilles Gauthier	299	1.51		$1,751
Green	Frank de Jong	218	1.10	−0.24	$0
Natural Law	Ian A.G. Campbell	109	0.55	−0.35	$131
Marxist-Leninist	Serge Lafortune	61	0.31	+0.02	$136
Abolitionist	John Turmel	46	0.23	+0.17	$0
Total valid votes		19,843	100.00		
Total rejected ballots		201			
Turnout		20,004	30.39	−32.04	
Electors on the lists		65,824			

1993 Canadian federal election
Party	Candidate	Votes	%	±%
Liberal	Jean-Robert Gauthier	31,216	70.46	+11.25
Progressive Conservative	Marie-Christine Lemire	4,486	10.13	-13.07
Reform	Sam Dancey	3,553	8.02	
New Democratic	Willie Dunn	2,935	6.62	-9.36
Green	Frank de Jong	606	1.37	
National	Raymond Samuels	497	1.12	
Independent	David Talbot	429	0.97	
Natural Law	Roger Bouchard	414	0.93	
Marxist–Leninist	Serge Lafortune	138	0.31	
Abolitionist	Steven Edward White	28	0.06	
Total valid votes		44,302	100.00	

1988 Canadian federal election
Party	Candidate	Votes	%	±%
Liberal	Jean-Robert Gauthier	28,581	59.21	+10.13
Progressive Conservative	Gilles Guénette	11,197	23.20	-5.63
New Democratic	Kathryn Barnard	7,712	15.98	-5.50
Rhinoceros	Charlie le concierge McKenzie	460	0.95	
Independent	Jean-Claude Viens	256	0.53	
Independent	Louis Lang	61	0.13	
Total valid votes		48,267	100.00	

1984 Canadian federal election
Party	Candidate	Votes	%	±%
Liberal	Jean-Robert Gauthier	21,401	49.08	-17.42
Progressive Conservative	Michel Lamoureux	12,571	28.83	+11.03
New Democratic	Kathryn Barnard	9,364	21.48	+7.68
Independent	Serge Girard	265	0.61	
Total valid votes		43,601	100.00	

1980 Canadian federal election
Party	Candidate	Votes	%	±%
Liberal	Jean-Robert Gauthier	27,564	66.50	+3.08
Progressive Conservative	Moe Royer	7,379	17.80	-2.58
New Democratic	Jim Stark	5,721	13.80	-2.05
Rhinoceros	Graham Prickles Ashby	519	1.25	
Independent	Gail Dexter Lord	166	0.40	
Marxist–Leninist	Serge Lafortune	100	0.24	-0.12
Total valid votes		41,449	100.00	

1979 Canadian federal election
Party	Candidate	Votes	%	±%
Liberal	Jean-Robert Gauthier	28,098	63.42	-4.90
Progressive Conservative	Moe Royer	9,098	20.38	+2.80
New Democratic	Paul H. Michaud	7,023	15.85	+5.50
Marxist–Leninist	Serge Lafortune	159	0.36	
Total valid votes		44,378	100.00	

1974 Canadian federal election
Party	Candidate	Votes	%	±%
Liberal	Jean-Robert Gauthier	21,773	68.32	+5.38
Progressive Conservative	Claude L. Choquette	5,603	17.58	-0.98
New Democratic	Paul H. Michaud	3,298	10.35	-4.03
Social Credit	Cyril E. Gauthier	976	3.06	-0.42
Independent	Judith T. Haddad	114	0.36	
Independent	Edmond Irani	107	0.34	
Total valid votes		31,871	100.00	

=== Ottawa East ===
1972 Canadian federal election
Party	Candidate	Votes	%	±%
Liberal	Jean-Robert Gauthier	20,446	62.94	-15.70
Progressive Conservative	Gerry Valiquette	6,029	18.56	+5.98
New Democratic	François Beaulne	4,672	14.38	+5.60
Social Credit	Cyril E. Gauthier	1,229	3.48	
Independent	David S. White	208	0.64	
Total valid votes		32,584	100.00	

1968 Canadian federal election
Party	Candidate	Votes	%	±%
Liberal	J.-T. Richard	26,170	78.64	+9.25
Progressive Conservative	Rex Le Lacheur	4,186	12.58	-6.26
New Democratic	Ian Macdonald	2,921	8.78	-3.00
Total valid votes		33,277	100.00	

1965 Canadian federal election
Party	Candidate	Votes	%	±%
Liberal	J.-T. Richard	15,107	69.39	+21.78
Progressive Conservative	Rex Le Lacheur	4,101	18.84	+3.17
New Democratic	Ben Coffey	2,564	11.78	+6.11
Total valid votes		21,772	100.00	

1963 Canadian federal election
Party	Candidate	Votes	%	±%
Liberal	J.-T. Richard	12,043	47.61	-17.46
Independent	Yves Parisien	6,574	25.99	
Progressive Conservative	Rex Le Lacheur	3,964	15.67	-12.11
New Democratic	Ruth Townsend	1,433	5.67	+0.70
Social Credit	Roger Boulanger	930	3.68	+1.50
Independent	Laurent Bordeleau	349	1.38	
Total valid votes		25,293	100.00	

1962 Canadian federal election
Party	Candidate	Votes	%	±%
Liberal	J.-T. Richard	15,930	65.07	+3.65
Progressive Conservative	Jean-Pierre Beaulne	6,801	27.78	-7.47
New Democratic	Marc Llanos	1,216	4.97	+2.92
Social Credit	Wilfrid H. Rigney	534	2.18	+0.90
Total valid votes		24,481	100.00	

Note: NDP vote is compared to CCF vote in 1958 election. Communist vote is compared to Labour-Progressive vote in 1958 election.

1958 Canadian federal election
Party	Candidate	Votes	%	±%
Liberal	J.-T. Richard	17,161	61.42	-9.66
Progressive Conservative	R.-D. Chenier	9,850	35.25	+12.04
Co-operative Commonwealth	William A. Layman	573	2.05	-0.37
Social Credit	Raymond Berthiaume	357	1.28	-2.01
Total valid votes		27,941	100.00	

1957 Canadian federal election
Party	Candidate	Votes	%	±%
Liberal	J.-T. Richard	18,216	71.08	-3.64
Progressive Conservative	Eleanor Blackburn	5,947	23.21	+2.68
Social Credit	Raymond Berthiaume	843	3.29	
Co-operative Commonwealth	William A. Layman	620	2.42	-2.13
Total valid votes		25,626	100.00	

1953 Canadian federal election
Party	Candidate	Votes	%	±%
Liberal	J.-T. Richard	19,863	74.72	+4.72
Progressive Conservative	Arthur Beauchesne	5,511	20.53	+2.11
Co-operative Commonwealth	W. Victor O'Brien	1,209	4.55	-0.02
Total valid votes		26,583	100.00	

1949 Canadian federal election
Party	Candidate	Votes	%	±%
Liberal	J.-T. Richard	20,895	70.00	+20.52
Progressive Conservative	Lionel Choquette	5,499	18.42	-1.40
Co-operative Commonwealth	Henri Robert	1,363	4.57	-2.64
Independent	Joseph Albert Pinard	1,108	3.71	-17.00
Independent	Edward Victor O'Meara	777	2.60	
Social Credit	Patrice Brunet	208	0.70	
Total valid votes		29,850	100.00	

1945 Canadian federal election
Party	Candidate	Votes	%	±%
Liberal	J.-T. Richard	15,014	49.48	+6.88
Independent Liberal	Joseph Albert Pinard	6,284	20.71	
Progressive Conservative	Henri Saint-Jacques	6,013	19.82	-1.35
Co-operative Commonwealth	Armand Ducharme	2,188	7.21	
Social Credit	Joseph-Ubald Dupont	374	1.23	
Independent	James-Aimé Cronier	295	0.97	
Independent	Max Feller	176	0.58	
Total valid votes		30,344	100.00	

Note: Progressive Conservative vote is compared to "National Government" vote in 1940 election.

1940 Canadian federal election
Party	Candidate	Votes	%	±%
Liberal	Joseph Albert Pinard	12,373	42.60	+1.36
Independent Liberal	Aurèle Chartrand	10,526	36.24	
National Government	Armand Ducharme	6,149	21.17	
Total valid votes		29,048	100.00	

Canadian federal by-election, 26 October 1936
Party	Candidate	Votes	%	±%
Chevrier appointed to the High Court of Justice of Ontario
Liberal	Joseph Albert Pinard	9,726	41.24	-22.90
Independent Liberal	William Michael Unger	6,832	28.97	
Independent	Jean Tissot	3,449	14.63	-0.68
Independent Liberal	Cecile Gauthier-O'Regan	1,849	7.84	
Independent Liberal	Rufus Henry Parent	1,726	7.32	
Total valid votes		23,582	100.00	

Result by area

Area	O'Regan	Parent	Pinard	Tissot	Unger
Riverdale Ward	50	243	143	202	851
St. George's Ward	617	394	1,975	795	3,464
By Ward	415	373	2,623	873	531
Ottawa Ward	269	292	3,266	873	406
Rideau Ward	130	158	510	176	951
Rockcliffe	37	16	40	11	211
Eastview	329	249	1,161	516	409

1935 Canadian federal election
Party	Candidate	Votes	%
Liberal	Edgar-Rodolphe-Eugène Chevrier	16,598	64.14
Independent	Jean Tissot	3,961	15.31
Conservative	Lionel Choquette	3,701	14.30
Reconstruction	Wilbert Spearman	1,617	6.25
Total valid votes		25,877	100.00

== See also ==
- List of Canadian electoral districts
- Historical federal electoral districts of Canada
