= Pineview, Ottawa =

Coordinates: 45°25′28″N 75°36′21″W

Pineview
- Neighbourhood
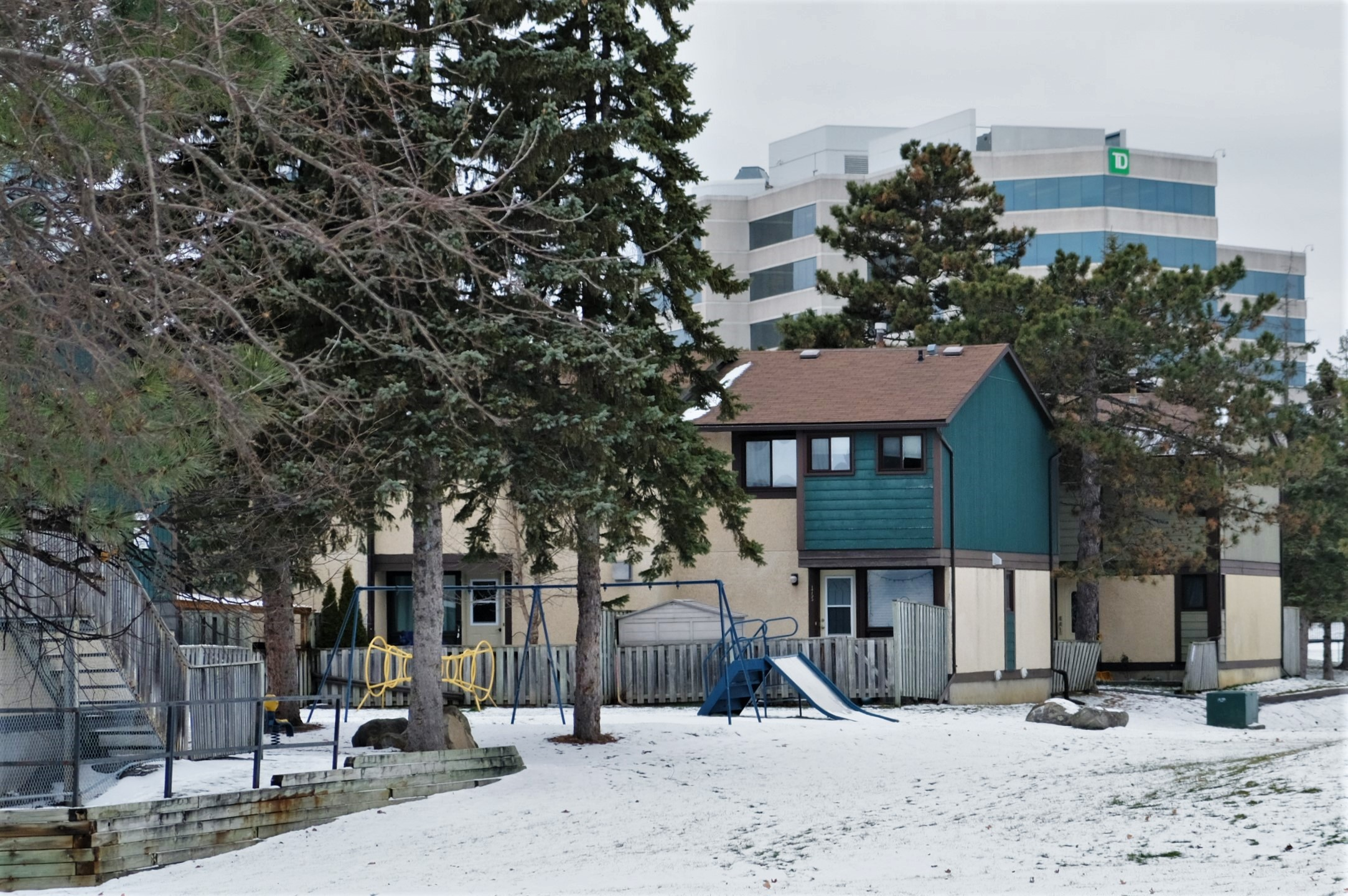
- Interactive map of Pineview
- Country: Canada
- Province: Ontario
- City: Ottawa

Government
  - MPs: Mona Fortier
  - MPPs: Lucille Collard
  - Councillors: Tim Tierney

Area
  - Total: 5.1 km^{2} (2.0 sq mi)

Population (2021)
  - Total: 6,179
- Canada 2021 Census
- Time zone: UTC-5 (Eastern (EST))

Pineview (also spelled Pine View) is a neighbourhood in Beacon Hill-Cyrville Ward in the east end of Ottawa, Ontario, Canada. Prior to amalgamation in 2001, the neighbourhood was part of the City of Gloucester. As of the Canada 2021 Census, the neighbourhood had a population of 6,179.

It is bounded by the Queensway on the north, Highway 417 to the west, the Greenbelt on the east and Innes Road to the south. Its adjacent neighbourhoods are Beacon Hill, Blackburn Hamlet and Cyrville.

Notable locations in Pineview include:

- The Telesat building
- The former City of Gloucester City Hall
- John Paul II Catholic School
- Ecole des Pins
- Pineview Golf Course

The neighbourhood is also across from a large commercial area of big box and large department stores on Innes Road between Blair Road and Highway 417.

== History ==
Pineview was formerly known as Seguin Heights, named after Joseph-Arthur Seguin of Dalkeith, Ontario, an early landowner.

== See also ==
- List of Ottawa neighbourhoods
