= Tim Tierney =

Tim Tierney may refer to:

- Tim Tierney (politician)
- Tim Tierney (American football)
