= Beacon Hill-Cyrville Ward =

Beacon Hill-Cyrville
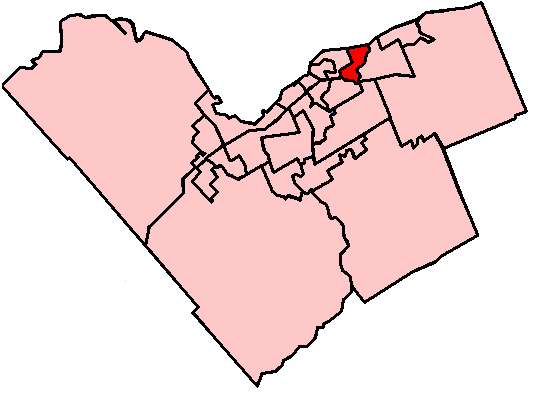
- Location within Ottawa
- Coordinates: 45.435°N 75.609°W
- Country: Canada
- Province: Ontario
- City: Ottawa

Government
  - Councillor: Tim Tierney

Area
  - Total: 41.2 km^{2} (15.9 sq mi)

Population (2016)Canada 2016 Census
  - Total: 32,460
  - Density: 788/km^{2} (2,040/sq mi)

Languages (2016)
  - English: 51.2%
  - French: 25.9%
  - Arabic: 5.9%
  - Spanish: 2.0%
  - Creoles: 1.2%
  - Tagalog: 1.2%
  - Cantonese: 1.2%
  - Mandarin: 1.1%
  - Persian: 1.1%
  - Bengali: 1.1%
- Avg. income: $41,674

Beacon Hill-Cyrville Ward (Ward 11) is a city ward in Ottawa, Ontario. Located in the city's east end, the ward is bordered to the west by Blair Road from the Ottawa River to Ogilvie Road and St. Laurent Boulevard south of it, the south by the Via Rail train line and Innes Ward, to the east by Green's Creek and Regional Road 174 and to the north by the Ottawa River. It includes the communities of Cyrville, Rothwell Heights, Beacon Hill and Pineview.

== Regional and city councillors ==
- Prior to 1994, the area was represented by the Mayor of Gloucester and 2 at large Gloucester city and regional councillors. From 1994 to 2000 the area was covered by Gloucester North and Cyrville Wards on Gloucester City Council.
1. Michel Bellemare (1994-2010)
2. Tim Tierney (2010–present)

== Election results ==
=== 2026 Ottawa municipal election ===
2026 Ottawa municipal election: Beacon Hill-Cyrville
Candidate	Popular vote			Expenditures
Candidate	Votes	%	±%	Expenditures
Tim Tierney (X)	5,978	63.10		
Cathryne Milburn	3,100	32.72		
Coreen Corcoran	396	4.18		
Total valid votes	9,622			
Total rejected, unmarked and declined votes				
Turnout		34.26		
Eligible voters	28,082			
Note: Candidate campaign colours are based on the prominent colour used in campaign items (signs, literature, etc.) and are used as a visual differentiation between candidates.

=== 2022 Ottawa municipal election ===
City council
Candidate	Vote	%
Tim Tierney	7,617	81.96
Miranda Gray	1,265	13.61
Nicolas Castro	411	4.42

=== 2018 Ottawa municipal election ===
City council
Candidate	Vote	%
Tim Tierney	6,730	81.34
Michael Schurter	1,544	18.66

=== 2014 Ottawa municipal election ===
City council
Candidate	Vote	%
Tim Tierney	7,162	82.11
Michel Tardif	518	5.94
Francesca D'Ambrosio	433	4.96
Nicolas Séguin	421	4.83
Rene Tessier	188	2.16

Ottawa mayor (Ward results)
Candidate	Vote	%
Jim Watson	6,815	79.20
Mike Maguire	1,336	15.53
Rebecca Pyrah	106	1.23
Anwar Syed	87	1.01
Michael St. Arnaud	85	0.99
Robert White	65	0.76
Darren W. Wood	61	0.71
Bernard Couchman	50	0.58

=== 2010 Ottawa municipal election ===
City council
Candidate	Votes	%
Tim Tierney	5088	49.34
Michel Bellemare	4907	47.58
O'Neil Brooke	318	3.08

=== 2006 Ottawa municipal election ===
City council
Candidate	Votes	%
Michel Bellemare	6905	61.73%
Frank Reid	4281	38.27%

=== 2003 Ottawa municipal election ===
City council
Candidate	Votes	%
Michel Bellemare	4613	61.04%
Frank Reid	2812	47.21%
Osman Abdi	132	1.75%

=== 2000 Ottawa municipal election ===
Following Gloucester's amalgamation into Ottawa, incumbent regional councillor Michel Bellemare defeated Gloucester City Councillor (for Cyrville Ward) Pat Clark.

City council
Candidate	Votes	%
Michel Bellemare	6,547	57.87
Pat Clark	4,767	42.13

=== 1997 Ottawa-Carleton Regional Municipality elections ===
Regional council
Candidate	Votes	%
Michel Bellemare	3,727	56.87
Fiona Faucher	2,827	43.13

=== 1994 Ottawa-Carleton Regional Municipality elections ===
Regional council
Candidate	Votes	%
Michel Bellemare	3,582	44.75
Fiona Faucher	3,389	42.34
Christian Bilinsky	1,034	12.92
