= Ottawa Road 174 =

Controlled-access highway in Ottawa

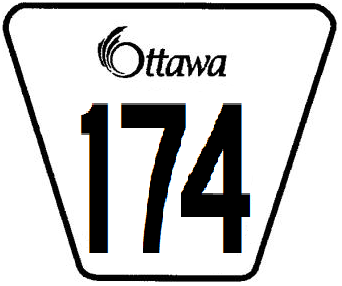
Ottawa Road 174
- "Highway 174", "Regional Road 174"
- Ottawa Road 174 highlighted in red

Route information
- Maintained by City of Ottawa, control to be given to Provincial Government
- Length: 27.0 km (16.8 mi)
- History: Formerly Ontario Highway 17, downloaded 1998 to Ottawa-Carleton Region, transferred to City of Ottawa in 2001

Major junctions
- West end: Continues as Highway 417
- East end: Continues as Prescott & Russell County Road 17

Location
- Country: Canada
- Province: Ontario
- Major cities: Ottawa; Gloucester, Orleans, Cumberland

Highway system
- Ontario municipal expressways
(in alphabetical order)
← Nikola Tesla Boulevard	Ottawa Road 174	Red Hill Valley Parkway →

Ottawa Road 174, formerly Ottawa-Carleton Regional Road 174 and commonly referred to as Highway 174, is a municipal expressway and numbered road in the City of Ottawa which serves the eastern suburbs of Orléans and Cumberland. The four-lane freeway segment between Highway 417/Aviation Parkway junction to Trim Road (Ottawa Road 57) is also known as the Queensway, in addition the Queensway name continues to be applied to Highway 417 west of that intersection. Although the road continues through the towns of Rockland and Hawkesbury to the Quebec border, the portion east of the Ottawa city boundary is known as Prescott and Russell County Road 17.

Originally the alignment of Highway 17, which was the route of the Trans-Canada Highway between Ottawa and the Quebec border, Regional Road 174 (as it was then designated) was created on April 1, 1997 when the provincial government transferred responsibility for portions of the road to the township of Gloucester and the township of Cumberland and moved the Trans-Canada route onto Highway 417. The road was extended by a second transfer on January 1, 1998, bringing it to its current length.

On March 28, 2024, Ontario Premier Doug Ford announced Highway 174 will be uploaded to the province of Ontario.

== Route description ==
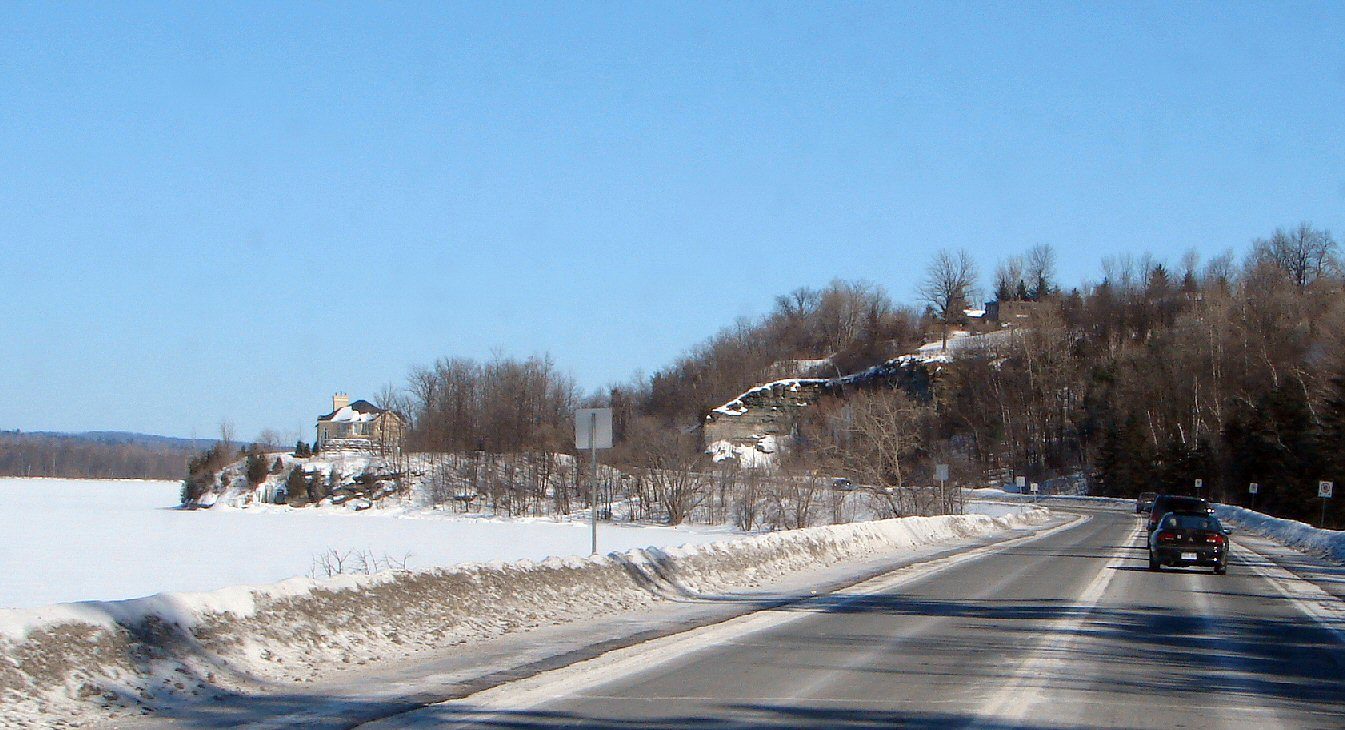
Ottawa Road 174 between Orléans and Cumberland

Ottawa Road 174 is a freeway (Note: The City of Ottawa classifies Ottawa Road 174 as a "City Freeway" from Highway 417 to approximately 450 m (1,500 ft) east of Trim Road (Ottawa Road 57), and an arterial road thereafter to the Ottawa city limits.) on the east side of Ottawa that extends from The Split — an interchange with Highway 417 — to the city limits at Canaan Road. The segment between the Highway 417 junction and Trim Road is a four-lane controlled-access highway, while the remainder east of Trim Road is a rural two lane arterial road. Dedicated OC Transpo bus lanes are in the shoulder lanes in each direction from Blair Road to Place d'Orléans. At the United Counties of Prescott and Russell county line it becomes Prescott-Russell County Road 17, which continues to Hawkesbury.

Beginning at the split with Highway 417, the opposing lanes of Ottawa Road 174 (henceforth referred to as Highway 174) converge together as a divided four lane highway, and proceed northeast into the Beacon Hill neighbourhood of Ottawa. An interchange serves Blair Road (Ottawa Road 27), after which a pair of bus lanes join the outside of the highway. Construction is underway on Stage 2 of O-Train's Line 1, which will result in an LRT between the opposing lanes of the freeway from east of Blair Road to Trim Road. The route curves northward to run parallel to Green Creek within the Greenbelt along the southeast side of Gloucester, before encountering an interchange with Montreal Road (Ottawa Road 34, and the original route of Highway 17). After curving back to the northeast and crossing Green Creek, the highway passes through farm fields then enters the bedroom community of Orléans.

Highway 174 travels in a straight line for approximately 8.5 kilometres (5.3 mi) through the northern part of Orléans, with interchanges at Jeanne D'Arc Boulevard (Ottawa Road 55) and Champlain Street within the Covenant Glen neighbourhood. Between the two interchanges, the highway is crossed by Orleans Boulevard, while the Place d'Orléans shopping mall is located at the latter interchange. A final interchange, with Tenth Line Road (Ottawa Road 47/47A), lies northeast of the mall. The divided road ends shortly after an at-grade intersection with Trim Road and the route narrows to two lanes.

Beyond Trim Road, Highway 174 gradually curves east and follows along the southern shore of the Ottawa River. It passes through the village of Cumberland, where it is briefly sandwiched between the river and the original routing of Highway 17 along Old Montreal Road. It passes north of the Cumberland Heritage Village Museum and exits the village. Highway 174 ends shortly thereafter at an intersection with Canaan Road. Prescott-Russell County Road 17 continues beyond the intersection towards Hawkesbury and the Quebec boundary.

== History ==
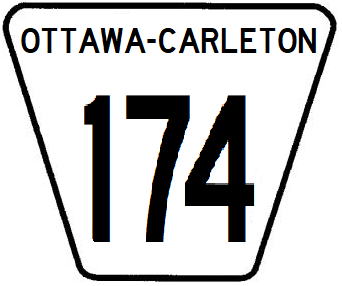
Former shield used for Ottawa-Carleton Regional Road 174

Highway 174 was created on April 1, 1997, when the Ministry of Transportation of Ontario transferred the responsibility of maintenance and upkeep along 14.2 kilometres (8.8 mi) of Highway 17, between Highway 417 and Trim Road (Regional Road 57), to the township of Gloucester and the township of Cumberland.

=== Predecessors ===
The alignment of Highway 174 originated during the late 1940s. Aiming to bypass the winding and hilly route between Montreal and Ottawa, the Department of Highways, predecessor to the Ministry of Transportation, planned a new route for Highway 17. The majority of this new route was built along the right-of-way of a former Canadian Northern Railway track. Construction began in 1947 at Green's Creek, east of Gloucester, and proceeded east towards Rockland. Another contract, which began in August 1949, extended construction beyond Trim Road to Canaan Road. The new route, which was internally referred to as Highway 17 Alt, was completed and opened to traffic on November 10, 1952. However, it was not given unique designation until 1955.

To the west, construction of the Queensway was soon to begin. It was a major part of the Greber Plan, which was produced by Jacques Gréber under the direction of Prime Minister Mackenzie King in the late 1940s. Although Gréber had been corresponding with King as early as 1936, World War II halted any plans from reaching fruition at that time. Following the war, Gréber was again contacted and his expertise requested. He arrived on October 2, 1945 and began working almost immediately. The Greber Plan was released in 1950 and presented to the House of Commons on May 22, 1951. The plan called for the complete reorganization of Ottawa's road and rail network, and included amongst the numerous parkways was an east to west expressway along what was then a Canadian National Railway line.

With the rail lines removed, construction of the new expressway got underway in 1957 when Queen Elizabeth visited Ottawa to open the first session of the 23rd Parliament. On October 15, the Queen detonated dynamite charges from the Hurdman Bridge, which now overlooks the highway as it crosses the Rideau River, and formally dedicated the new project as the Queensway. At the ceremony, premier Leslie Frost indicated that the entire project would cost C$31 million and emphasized the importance of the link to the Trans-Canada Highway.

The Queensway was constructed in four phases, each opening independently. The section from Alta Vista Drive (now Riverside Drive) east to the split between Highway 17 (Montreal Road) and Highway 17 Alt was the first phase, and was opened to traffic on November 25, 1960, extending west to the Rideau River. Construction of a new freeway between Ottawa and Montreal, entirely bypassing the route of Highway 17, began in the late 1960s. Contracts to construct the route were opened to bidding on November 15, 1968; construction began in May 1969 starting at Base Line Road (now Ramsayville Road) and proceeding easterly. The segment of this new freeway that linked to the Queensway at The Split was the final one to open, on December 2, 1975. The portion of the Queensway west of the new interchange became part of Highway 417 by 1980, while the portion to the east remained part of Highway 17.

=== Extension of four-laning ===
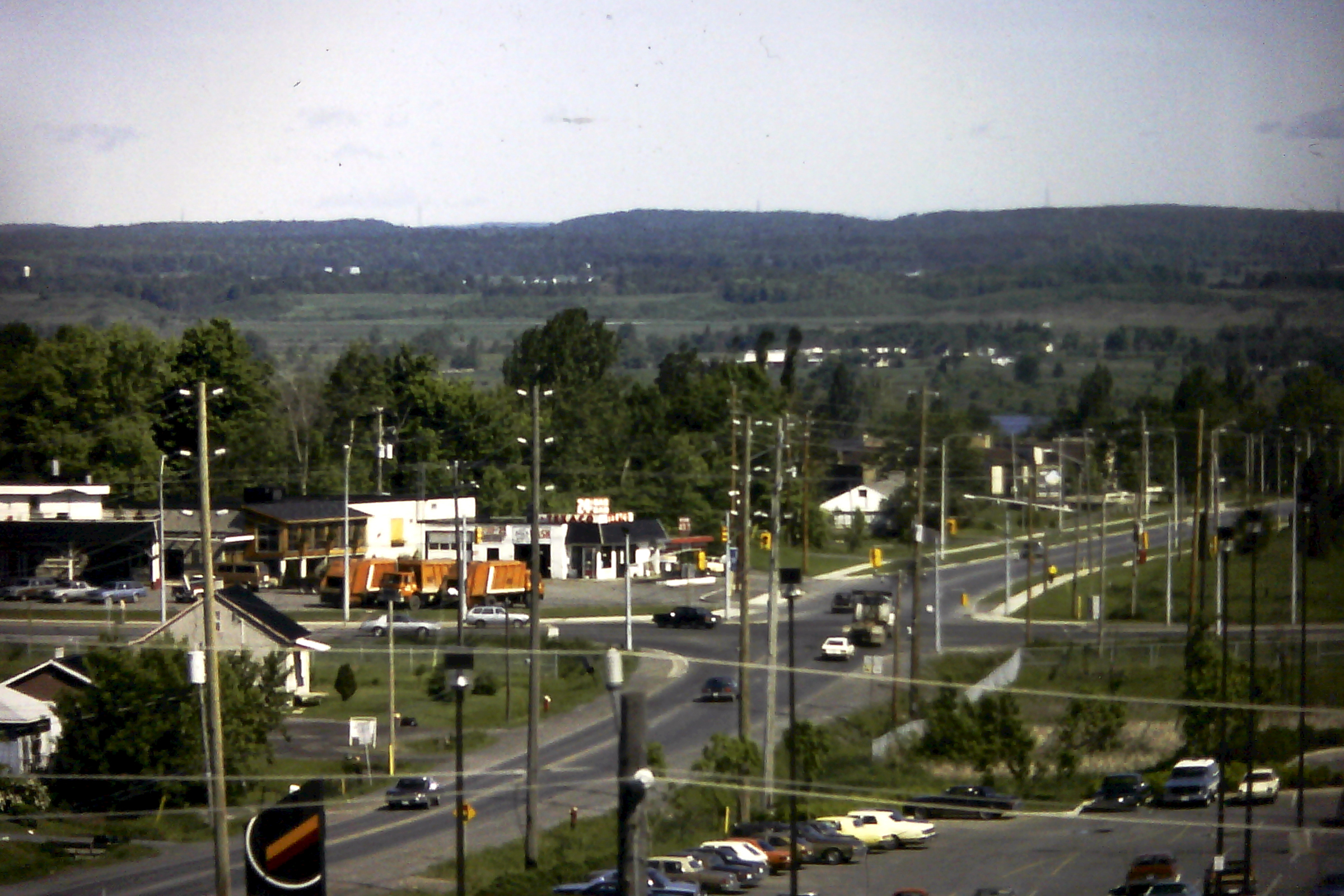
Highway 17 & Champlain St. intersection at Place d'Orléans in 1982

The portion of Highway 17 immediately east of Montreal Road quickly became known for routine fatal accidents. During the course of a 27-month study conducted between 1966 and 1969, 56 deaths occurred on what had by then become known as the "killer strip". However, the provincial government was reluctant to upgrade the highway due to the construction of Highway 417 between Ottawa and the Quebec boundary, which it expected would handle the majority of traffic. However, despite the completion of Highway 417 at the end of 1975, crashes continued to occur on the 3-kilometre (1.9 mi) stretch Highway 17 west of Champlain Street, including 132 in 1978, 5 of which were fatal. Residents and local politicians began a campaign by early 1979, pressuring the provincial government to widen the route and build interchanges.

The province announced the widening of Highway 17 from Montreal Road to Champlain Street on April 15, 1980; construction began in late May and was scheduled for completion in November, but would not include any grade-separations or interchanges. The Jeanne D'Arc Boulevard interchange was built in 1985. Studies began in 1986 to examine the Highway 17 corridor east of Ottawa, and recommended that the route be widened between Champlain Street and Trim Road. Reconstruction of the section between Champlain Street and Trim Road was officially announced on May 17, 1988. Work began in mid-1990, with the highway being detoured onto the future offramps to Champlain Street to allow the at-grade intersection to be rebuilt. the Champlain Street/Place d'Orleans interchange and the Tenth Line Road interchange were opened along with the widened Highway 17 on November 4, 1994.

Despite the protests of the city that the road served a provincial purpose, a second round of transfers saw Highway 17 east of Ottawa downloaded entirely on January 1, 1998 adding 12.8 km (8.0 mi) to the length of Regional Road 174. The Trans-Canada Highway designation was subsequently moved from the former Highway 17 to Highway 417. Ottawa immediately renumbered the transferred sections of Highway 17 as Regional Road 174. Regional Road 174 was renamed Ottawa Road 174 when the Regional Municipality of Ottawa–Carleton amalgamated with the municipalities of the region to form the new City of Ottawa in 2001. The region, and later city, as well as the neighbouring county of Prescott-Russell, have petitioned the provincial government to "upload" the route back into the provincial highway network since then, and as recently as December 2021.

Despite no further work occurring since 1994 to extend the widening beyond Trim Road, several Environmental Assessments (EAs) have taken place since 1988, particularly to widen the segment between Trim Road and Prescott-Russell County Road 8 (Landry Road) near Rockland to a limited-access highway with a central concrete barrier.

=== Recent Developments ===
A significant portion of the upcoming Line 1 light rail, which has been under construction since 2013, would run in the median of the Ottawa Road 174 freeway section. While several LRT stations could be built adjacent to the existing overpasses crossing the freeway, the Montreal Road underpasses had to be rebuilt in order to accommodate the new Montréal station. The existing Blair Road flyover ramps, currently for bus traffic only, were demolished in favor of a new flyover bridge that would carry the LRT trains from Blair station into the highway's median.

On March 28, 2024, Ontario Premier Doug Ford announced a phased plan to guide the upload of Ottawa Road 174 to the province. The announcement was made alongside Ottawa Mayor Mark Sutcliffe. The deal between the provincial and municipal government was made as a part of a larger agreement for city funding. The funding included maintenance and rehabilitation for Ottawa Road 174 while a three-stage phased assessment of potential provincial ownership of the road is underway.

== Major intersections ==
The following table lists the major junctions along Ottawa Road 174. The entire route is located in Ottawa.

km	mi	Destinations	Notes
0.0	0.0	Highway 417 / TCH – Cornwall, Montreal	The Split; no access to Aviation Parkway; Highway 417 exit 113A
1.1	0.68	Road 27 (Blair Road)	
3.7	2.3	Road 34 (Montreal Road)	Formerly Highway 17B west
7.9	4.9	Road 55 (Jeanne d'Arc Boulevard)	
9.9	6.2	Road 84 (Place d'Orléans Drive); Road 39 (Champlain Street)	Access to Place d'Orléans mall
11.3	7.0	Road 47 (Tenth Line Road)	Eastbound access to Road 47 via Road 47 (Old Tenth Line Road) and Road 34 (St. Joseph Boulevard)
13.3	8.3	Road 57 (Trim Road)	
13.3	8.3	End of divided freeway	
20.1	12.5	Road 35 (Cameron Street)	
22.3	13.9	Morin Road	
25.0	15.5	Old Montreal Road	Original Highway 17 alignment
26.3	16.3	County Road 17 east	Ottawa city limits; continues as Prescott and Russell County Road 17
1.000 mi = 1.609 km; 1.000 km = 0.621 mi: Incomplete access; Route transition

== See also ==
- Queensway (Ottawa)
- List of roads in Ottawa
