= Michel Bellemare =

Canadian politician and lawyer

- Constituency: Beacon Hill-Cyrville Ward

Personal details
- Born: July 10, 1967 (age 59) Ottawa
- Spouse: Nathalie Tremblay
- Children: Étienne Bellemare Pascale Bellemare Véronique Bellemare

Michel Bellemare (born July 10, 1967) is a Canadian politician and lawyer.

Bellemare was a member of the City Council in Ottawa, Ontario, Canada from 1994 to 2010. He served as the acting as mayor of Ottawa, while mayor Larry O'Brien faced charges from May 2 to July 8, 2009 and represented Beacon Hill-Cyrville Ward in the east end of the city, formerly part of Gloucester.

Born in Ottawa, Bellemare is the son of former Liberal Member of Parliament Eugene Bellemare, and nephew of MP Jean-Robert Gauthier.

A lawyer by training, Bellemare first ran for a seat on the Regional Municipality of Ottawa-Carleton council (RMOC) in 1994. He was successful, defeating long-standing councillor Fiona Faucher. When the RMOC was abolished with the creation of the larger city of Ottawa in 2000, Bellemare was elected to the Ottawa City Council. In council, he is one of the strongest proponents of official bilingualism and tax cuts. He has also been a longtime opponent of Ottawa's O-Train light rail program and voted for the cancellation of the north-south line extension to Barrhaven which would have been completed and in operation starting in 2009.

Political offices
Preceded by None, ward amalgamated into Ottawa in 2000	City councillors from Beacon Hill-Cyrville Ward; 2000-2010	Succeeded by Tim Tierney
