= James Sieveright =

19th-century Scottish-born Canadian farmer

James Sieveright was a Scottish-born Canadian farmer and community leader.

He was born in Aberdeenshire about 1812, the son of English parents, and came to Upper Canada with his parents in 1824. He became the first reeve of Gloucester Township in 1850 and served a second term as reeve in 1865. Sieveright was also captain in the local militia and justice of the peace. In 1858, he married Isabella P. Smith.

The memory of James Sieveright remains in the name of a road in that township, in an area formerly rural but now part of Ottawa's Blossom Park suburb.
