= Earl Armstrong =

Canadian politician

Earl Armstrong (1900–1986) was an Ontario farmer and politician. He served as reeve of Gloucester Township from 1952 to 1972.

He was the son of William Armstrong and descended from Irish immigrants to Canada. He married Peninnah Sloan, a school teacher from Manotick. They had three children, Jack, Robert and Richard. He took over the operation of the family dairy farm and expanded its size. During his period in office as reeve, Gloucester Hydro and the Gloucester Police Force were established. Armstrong also served three years as warden for Carleton County.

The Earl Armstrong Arena and Earl Armstrong Road, both in the former Gloucester, Ontario, are named in his honour.
