= Cyrville =

- Neighbourhood
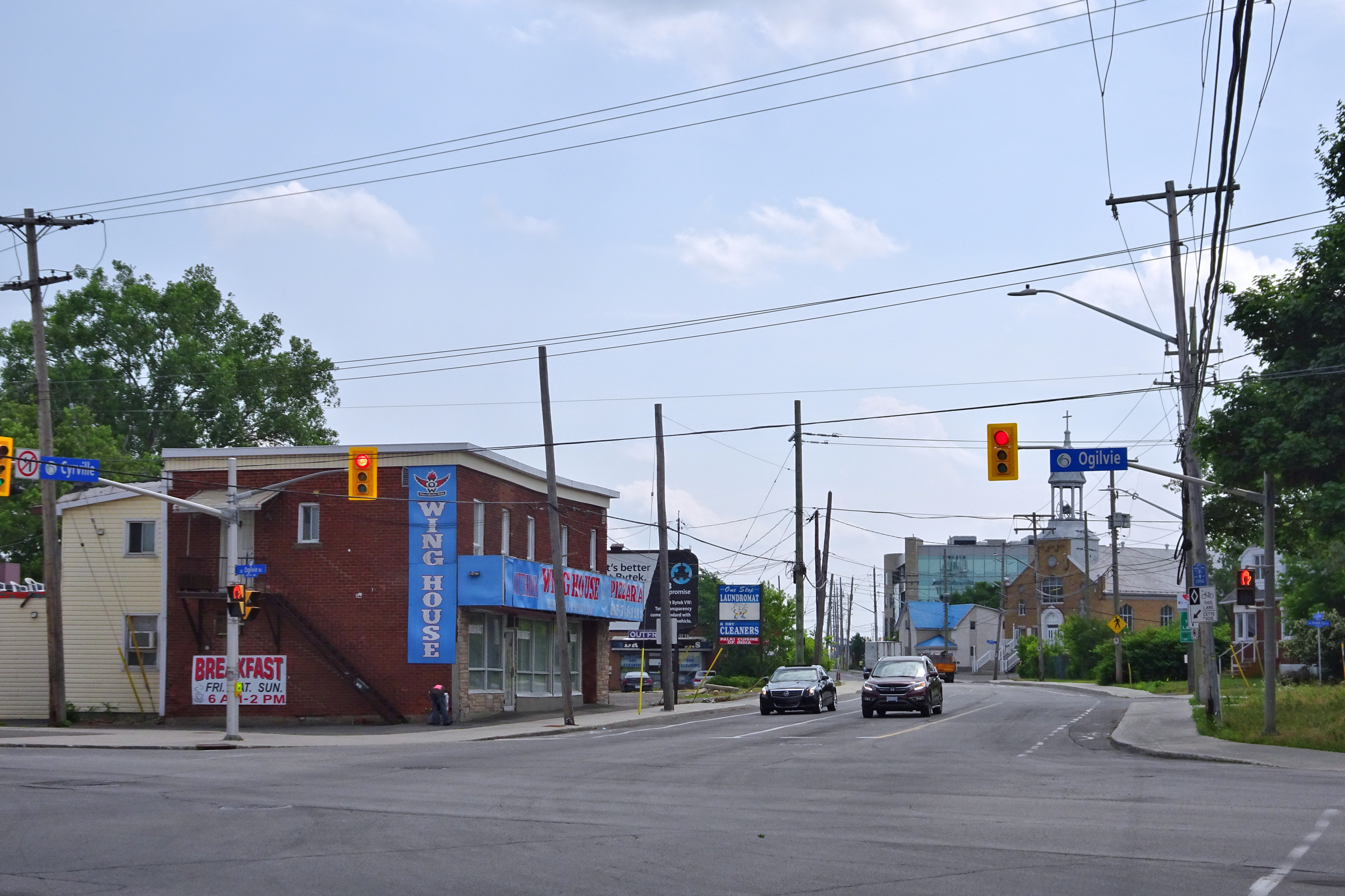
- Historic centre of Cyrville at the intersection of Cyrville and Ogilvie Roads

- Location within Ottawa
- Coordinates: 45°25′29″N 75°38′03″W
- Country: Canada
- Province: Ontario
- City: Ottawa
- Founding: 1853

Government
  - MPs: Mona Fortier, David McGuinty
  - MPPs: Lucille Collard, John Fraser
  - Councillors: Tim Tierney

Area
  - Total: 2.517 km^{2} (0.972 sq mi)
- Elevation: 70 m (230 ft)

Population (Canada 2016 Census)
  - Total: 4,513
  - Density: 1,793/km^{2} (4,644/sq mi)
- Time zone: Eastern (EST)
- Forward sortation areas: K1B, K1J

Cyrville (also referred to as Cummings) is a neighbourhood in Beacon Hill-Cyrville Ward in the east-end of Ottawa, Ontario, Canada. The area is located within the former City of Gloucester, and is roughly bounded on the north, west and south by the former Gloucester City limit, and on the east by the Aviation Parkway and Highway 417. Once a francophone farming village, the area now a mix of residential and industrial land, being home to the Cyrville Industrial Area. It has been described as a "tangle of freeways and utility corridors". It has a population of 4513 (2016 census), 280 of which live south of the Queensway.

== History ==
The area was founded as the Village of Cyrville in 1853 by Michel Cyr, when he bought lot 27, 2nd Concession, Ottawa front of Gloucester Township. This area runs from Innes Road in the south to Ogilvie Road in the north and from St. Laurent Boulevard in the west to Cummings Avenue in the east. A post office was built in 1850 and was named Cyrville in 1892. It was closed down in 1965.

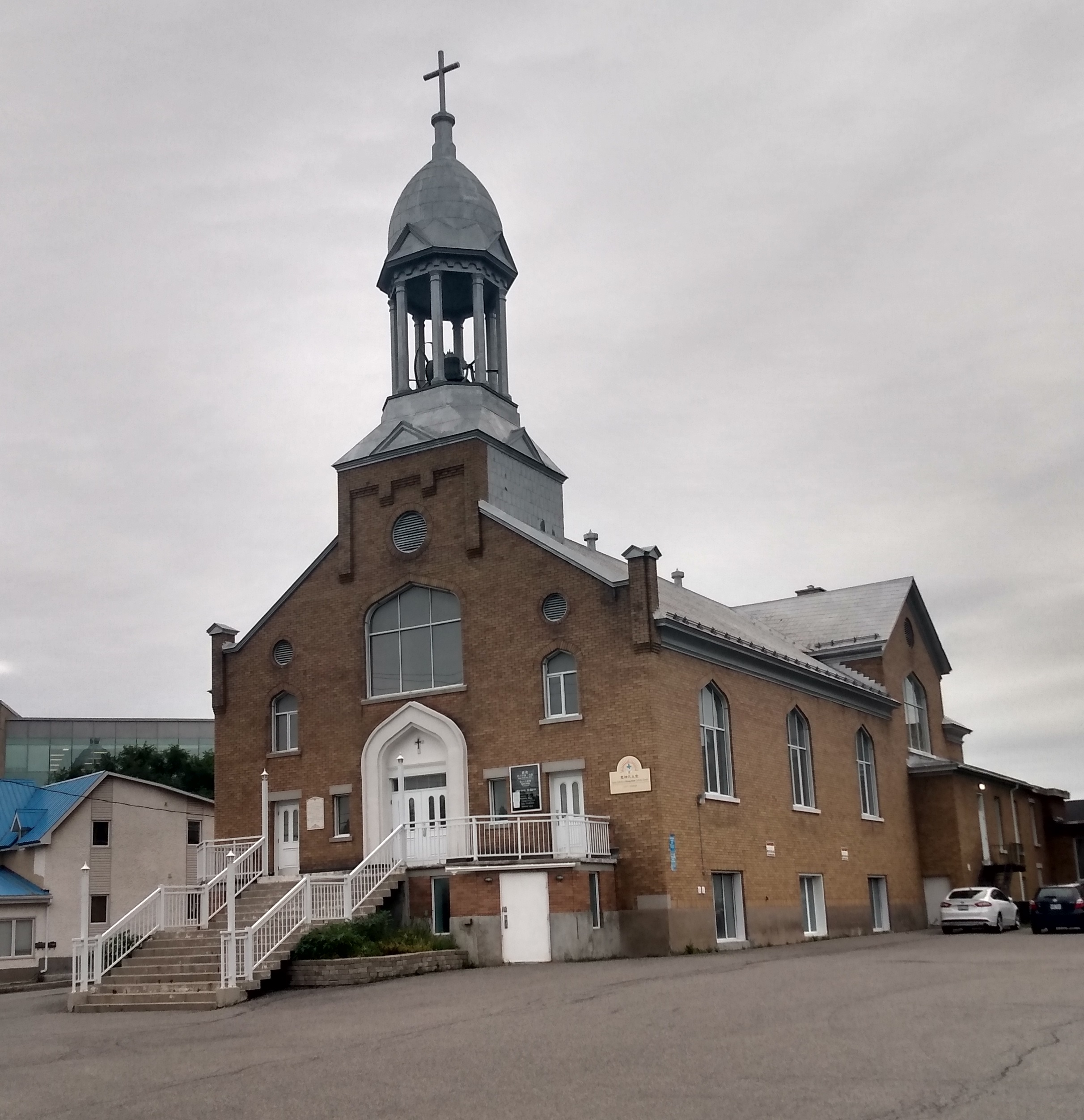
Sheng Shen Chinese Catholic Church (formerly Notre-Dame-de-Lourdes)

The founding settlers of the village were French Catholics. In 1871, the Notre-Dame-de-Lourdes-de-Cyrville church was built, and was considered the "spiritual centre" for the community. A school was built around the same time. The Canadian National Railway was built through the village in 1909 along with a station. The railway was removed in the 1930s, and the right of way would later be used to build a powerline. A Canadian Pacific Railway line ran further south through southern part of the village, which was called Willowdale. This railway still exists to this day, and is used by VIA Rail. The north part of the neighbourhood, sometimes referred to as "Cummings" began to be built in the late 1970s and 1980s. In the mid-2000s the Place des Gouverneurs condominium development was built by Richcraft Homes off of Ogilvie. Notre-Dame-de-Lourdes-de-Cyrville closed in 2009, and is now a Chinese Catholic church.
