= Montreal Road =

Street in Ottawa, Canada

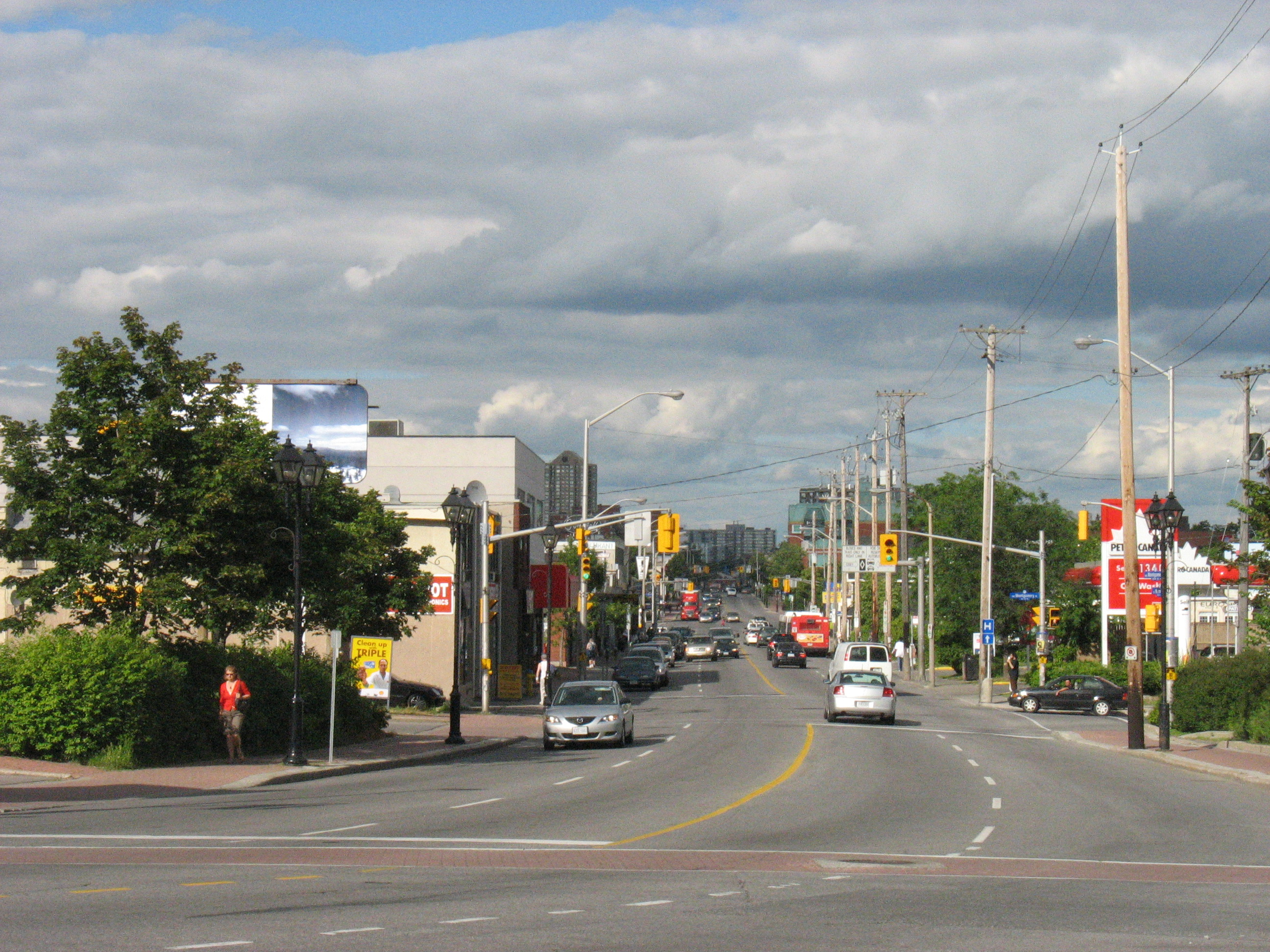
View of Montreal Road from Cummings Bridge (2008).

Montreal Road (French: Chemin de Montréal), also known as Ottawa Road #34, is a major east-west Ottawa road that links Lowertown to Vanier and the farther eastern neighbourhoods of Ottawa. Until downloading in 1998, it was part of the provincially managed Highway 17B.

Since the early 20th century, Montreal Road has been the cultural core of Vanier. It is one of a string of variously named roads that form an uninterrupted route between Parliament Hill and the City of Montreal, originally part of Ontario Highway 17, later bypassed by the freeway now known as Ottawa Road 174.

In French, it is known as Chemin de Montréal for most of its distance. The insertion of de in the 2010s marked a departure from the City's general bilingual street-naming policy to align with Francophone practice for streets that refer to place names.

At its western end, Montreal Road begins at the Cummings Bridge, which spans the Rideau River and is an extension of Rideau Street. It becomes Vanier's main street as it passes through the commercial heart of the community.

East of St. Laurent Boulevard, it becomes a four-lane arterial road that divides several neighbourhoods such as Beacon Hill.

At Regional Road 174, Montreal Road becomes St. Joseph Boulevard, which runs through the older portions of Orléans Village until Trim Road. It continues east of Trim Road under the name Old Montreal Road. This road, which was known as Queen Street prior to amalgamation in 2001, goes through the old Cumberland Village and ends at Regional Road 174 just past Becketts Creek.

Points of interest along this road are (from west to east):

- Montfort Hospital (Ontario's largest Francophone hospital)
- National Research Council labs
- Greens Creek Conservation Area
- Place d'Orléans Shopping Centre
- Orléans Town Centre.

There are bus lanes between North River Road and St. Laurent Boulevard to speed transit service during rush hours. Future plans by the city could include an LRT corridor on this stretch as far as Blair Road, where the City has plans for a new "main street" development of shops and apartment towers.

== Neighbourhoods ==
Montreal Road goes through the following neighbourhoods:

- Vanier
- Cardinal Glen
- Rothwell Heights
- Beacon Hill

St. Joseph Boulevard goes through the following neighbourhoods (all part of Orléans):

- Convent Glen
- Queenswood
- Fallingbrook

== Major intersections ==
On Montreal Road:

- Vanier Parkway (Ottawa Road 19)
- St. Laurent Boulevard (Ottawa Road 26)
- Aviation Parkway
- Blair Road (Ottawa Road 27)
- Ogilvie Road (Ottawa Road 50)
- Ottawa Road 174

On St. Joseph Boulevard:

- Jeanne d'Arc Boulevard (Ottawa Road 55)
- Orléans Boulevard (Ottawa Road 56)
- Tenth Line Road (Ottawa Road 36)
- Trim Road (Ottawa Road 57)
