= Blair Road =

Arterial road in Ottawa, Ontario, Canada

- "Ottawa Road 27"
- Map of Blair Road
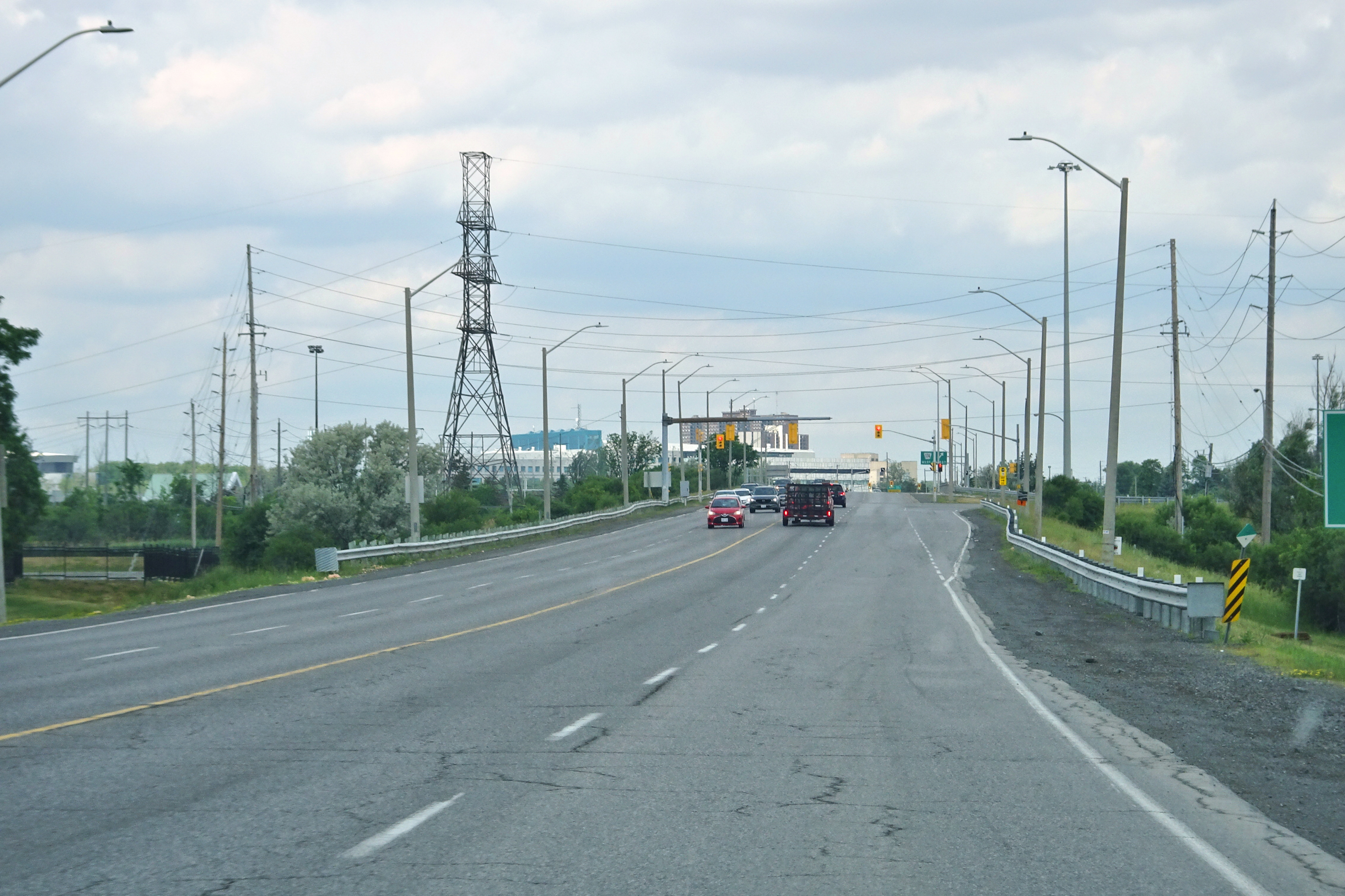
- Blair Road near its crossing with Ottawa Road 174

Route information
- Maintained by City of Ottawa
- Length: 5 km (3.1 mi)

Major junctions
- South end: Innes Road
- North end: Cul-de-sac before Sir George-Étienne Cartier Parkway

Location
- Country: Canada
- Province: Ontario
- Major cities: Ottawa

Highway system
- Roads in Ontario

Blair Road (Ottawa Road #27) is a road in the eastern part of Ottawa, Ontario, Canada. It begins just south of the Sir George-Étienne Cartier Parkway, but does not connect to the parkway, except for a small bike-path connection to the Ottawa River Pathway - one of the city's main bike trails that runs along the Ottawa River.

Starting out quite minor, the northernmost part of the road is a two-lane collector road (north of Montreal Road) or minor arterial road (south of Montreal Road), running past residential areas and to the east of the massive National Research Council and Canadian Security Intelligence Service campuses. The speed limit on this section is 50 km/h (31 mph) and has several steep hills. This section was known as Skead Road before being joined to the southern section in the early 1970s.

It becomes much larger on the south side of Ogilvie Road and Ottawa Road 174, where it becomes one of the major north-south routes in eastern Ottawa. It is also home to Blair station, the main transit terminal for east-central Ottawa. Blair is also one of the 13 stations on the east-west, light rail Line 1 of the O-Train, travelling through the downtown core and ending at Tunney's Pasture station. South of the Queensway it runs to the west of the Pineview Municipal Golf Club until it abruptly ends at Innes Road. The speed limit between Ogilvie Road and Pineview is 70 km/h (43 mph). From Pineview to its ending at Innes Road, the speed limit is once again 50 km/h (31 mph).

Communities along Blair Road:

- Pineview
- Beacon Hill South
- Beacon Hill North
