= Green's Creek (Ontario) =

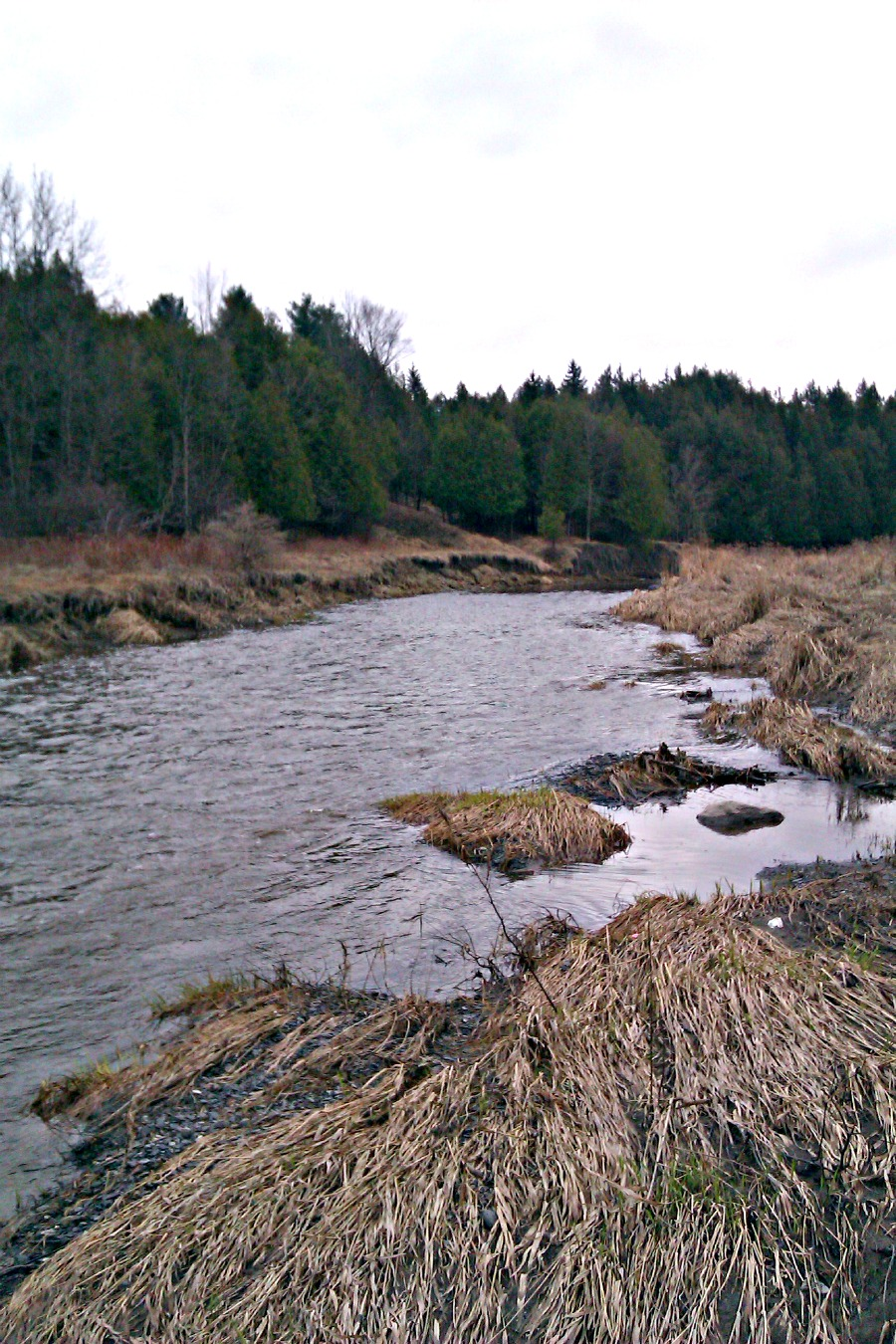
- Green's Creek in early spring

- Location within Southern Ontario

Location
- Country: Canada
- Province: Ontario
- Municipality: Ottawa

Physical characteristics
- Source: confluence of Borthwick and Ramsey Creeks
  - coordinates: 45°24′03″N 75°35′43″W
- Mouth: Ottawa River
  - coordinates: 45°28′29″N 75°34′09″W
- Length: 13.4 km (8.3 mi)
- Basin size: 19.29 km^{2} (7.45 sq mi)

Green's Creek is a small tributary of the Ottawa River that flows through the community of Gloucester in eastern Ottawa, Ontario, Canada. Among its tributaries are Borthwick Creek, Black Creek, Mud Creek, and Ramsay Creek, all of which spring in the Mer Bleue bog.

== Geography ==
The creek was formed approximately 10,000 years ago at the end of the Wisconsin Glaciation and the retreat of the Champlain Sea from the Ottawa Valley. Currently it starts at the confluence of Borthwick and Ramsey Creeks just west of the Walkley Road off-ramp from Highway 417 and flows 13.4 kilometres (8 1/4 miles) to the Ottawa River. From the meeting of its two main tributaries, Borthwick Creek runs eastwards for about four kilometres (2 1/2 miles) while Ramsey Creek proceeds southwards for approximately 10 kilometres (6 miles). Together these three creeks, and a few smaller streams including Black, Mud and McEwan Creeks, drain approximately 53 square kilometres (20 sq. mi.) – an area larger than the four smallest countries in the world combined.

There is a large area of silver maple swamp where it enters the Ottawa River; this is one of the most important wetland complexes along the south shore of the Ottawa River. Rare species include the only population of the provincially rare pinedrops (Pterospora andromeda) in the region, and the only regional population of witch-hazel (Hammamelis virginiana). The area is conserved as part of the Ottawa Greenbelt and 5.5 kilometres (3 1/2 miles) of walking trails have been maintained as part of the Green's Creek Valley conservation area.

Green's Creek is also geologically significant for its fine assemblage of fossil fish dating from the era of the Champlain Sea.

== Geology ==
It has cut deeply into sediments of the Champlain Sea, producing a complex mixture of forest types, from upland oak and pine to floodplain forest. As a consequence there are nearly 500 species of plants known from the area.

The surface geology of the creek bed is 84 per cent clay, 8 per cent bedrock, 6 per cent sand and 2 per cent diamicton.

== History ==
While there is no archeological evidence of the First Nations occupying the lands around Green’s Creek there is evidence of human habitation along what was the southwestern shore of the Champlain Sea near present day Perth as long as 11,000 years ago. It is likely that the area around Blackburn Hamlet was first used by humans around 10,500 years ago when bands from the late-paleo period began to hunt the forests that were beginning to take root after the end of glaciation and the retreat of the sea. From that time onwards the area fell within the traditional territory of the Anishinabe Algonquin people. Immediately prior to European contact the creek was almost certainly being used by the Weskarini band who traditionally occupied the South Nation River watershed.

However, by the 1620s the Weskarini were facing extreme pressure from the Iroquois Confederacy that was expanding northwards from New York State. Armed with Dutch firearms the Iroquois drove them out of the lower Ottawa Valley by the spring of 1642 and by 1650 even the Algonquin in the upper Ottawa Valley had been removed from their homelands. For most of the next 200 years trappers, traders and the famed coureur des bois travelled up and down the Ottawa River until the first European settlements in the area took root after 1800.

While Samuel De Champlain’s early exploration of the Ottawa River is generally well known, it was in fact his protégé, Étienne Brulé, who was the first European to pass by the mouth of Green’s Creek in 1610. Although Gloucester Township was first surveyed in 1792, it was not until 1812 that Braddish Billings became its first permanent resident and it seems that the first settlements around Green’s Creek were established sometime around the early 1830s. At the time of the first agricultural clearances, the land around the creek was still covered with large stands of red pine and oak trees and these were gradually cleared in the 1840s, 1850s and 1860s as squared timbers were cut on the tablelands above the creek and floated downstream in the spring run-off. One early account described logs up to 60 feet long, and 18 inches in diameter moving down the creek in their water to the Ottawa River. By the 1860s most of the land along the creek had been settled and many farms lined its banks including those owned by the Barnes, Kenney, Hopkins and Presley families although many of the surveyed lots away from the creek and Ottawa River still remained unassigned. Despite the clearing of the forests there was a sawmill on the upper end of the creek in the 1860s owned and operated by Prosper Oliver, who dammed the water to power his saws. Later, an 1880 map of Gloucester Township showed a different sawmill located at the mouth of the creek on the land of William Mosgrove, and by some accounts that industry remained in operation until the early 1900s.

Also, by the 1860s many of the main roads that are still in use today had been roughed out. Both Montreal Road and Navan Road were in place, and Innes Road had been extended east from Cyrville Road past Green’s Creek (although not as far as Blackburn Hamlet). The oldest of these thoroughfares, Montreal Road (then known as the King’s Road), was run through Gloucester Township in 1850. Initially a small ferry existed to carry passengers and freight across the creek, charging users between 10 and 20 cents on their way between Bytown and Orléans, Ontario. By the early 1860s a bridge had been constructed and a toll booth on the west side of the creek was operated by James Coombs, although by 1880 it appears that the tollgate had been moved to the east side of the bridge. Somewhat incredibly, there is even an account of a steamboat being seen fully two miles upstream of what is now Montreal Road in the 1850s.

At the start of the 1860s the west side of Green’s Creek at Montreal Road became the site of an important hotel and recreational area. The 1863 map of Carleton County shows a hotel owned by Joseph Lafleur near the location of the present-day Montreal Road interchange on Highway 174. By the 1870s this had become the Victoria Sulphur Springs Hotel owned by H.F. Brading and E.W. Hillman. Like other famed mineral springs such as those at Carlsbad Springs people came to this hotel to consume and bathe in the mineral rich waters. The spring, which was situated on the west bank of Green’s Creek just upstream from Montreal Road had a flow rate of 250 gallons per hour and contained particularly high levels of hydrogen sulphide and methane. Patrons to this hotel could purchase sulphur baths for 50 cents each, or a dozen for $5.00. They could also enjoy the adjacent Dominion Trotting Park – a horse racing track. It is not known when this facility shut down, but it was “in ruins” by 1917 and an aerial photograph of the site in 1928 shows no sign of it. Further south, near the current intersection of Andersen and Ridge Roads the Borthwick Mineral Springs were another important resource. While there was no hotel located at these springs the water was so widely known that a medical dictionary from had the following entry; “Borthwick Mineral Springs, Canada. Indo-bromated saline waters, used internally.” In the early 1890s both of these springs were listed as being amongst the largest producers of bottled mineral water in Canada.

In addition to the hotel at the Victoria Sulphur Springs there was also an inn located in Hiawatha Park near the current location of the Residence Saint-Louis. Founded as a summer resort called Besserer’s Grove in the early 1850s it remained a popular destination for day-trippers from Ottawa for many years. Nearby, Besserer’s Wharf acted as a port of call for the Ottawa River steamer “Empress” and families from the city would come out on weekends for a country getaway. An advertisement in the Ottawa Journal from 1896 promised as a pleasant place for picnic parties where visitors could depend upon “good food at reasonable prices.”

Green’s Creek is also well known for the small mineral concretions containing the remains of fresh and saltwater marine life that can be found along its shores. Green’s Creek is well-known in the geological and fossil collecting world due to the presence of smooth nodular formations that were commonly found from the mouth of the creek and along the south shore of the Ottawa River as far as Hiawatha Park. Specimens up to 10,000 years old containing the remains of near complete fish skeletons, ancient whale and seal bones and numerous smaller marine and terrestrial fauna have all been found along the shores of Green’s Creek. It is the only place in central Canada that many samples have been found and is one of only two locations where starfish remains from the Champlain Sea have been identified (the other being near Montreal). These deposits were well known to the early settlers of the region and at the time hundreds of them could be collected over the course of a few days. Enterprising businesses even sold these smooth, kidney shaped rocks to tourists as places such as Besserer’s Wharf.

== Ecology ==
Despite being a largely urban stream Green's Creek has an impressive level of biodiversity. On the land, mammals such as beaver, muskrat, coyotes, chipmunks, racoons, skunks, foxes, deer and even the occasional moose can be found along its banks. Almost 50 species of fish have been observed within the creek including; brook stickleback, pumpkinseed, channel catfish, rock bass, largemouth bass, common carp, walleye, northern pike and yellow perch.

Land use surrounding the creek is characterized as follows; 53% urban use, 19% forest, 12% agriculture, 12% meadow, 2% wetland and 1% each water and "rural."

== See also ==
- List of rivers of Ontario
