= Kempark =

Coordinates: 45.33491°N 75.60467°W

Kempark (sometimes spelled Kemp Park) is a community in Gloucester-Southgate Ward in the south end of Ottawa, Ontario, Canada. Prior to amalgamation in 2001, it located in City of Gloucester. The community is located at the south end of Conroy Road when it meets with Bank Street. It is located right next to the village of Leitrim, Ontario. It is about 12 km south of Downtown Ottawa. The community is home to approximately 200 people.
