= Beacon Hill, Ottawa =

Beacon Hill
- Neighbourhood
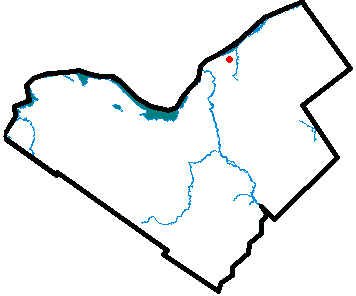
- Beacon Hill within the City of Ottawa
- Country: Canada
- Province: Ontario
- City: Ottawa

Area
  - Total: 7.692 km^{2} (2.970 sq mi)

Population (2016)
  - Total: 17,496

Beacon Hill is a neighbourhood located in Beacon Hill-Cyrville Ward in the east end of Ottawa, Ontario, Canada. Beacon Hill was a part of the City of Gloucester until it was amalgamated with the new city of Ottawa in 2001.

Beacon Hill is a primarily residential area, built in the 1960s and '70s. It consists of two parts, Beacon Hill North and Beacon Hill South, divided by Montreal Road. It includes the Robert O. Pickard sewage treatment plant and three high schools, Colonel By Secondary School, Gloucester High School, and Lester B. Pearson Catholic High School. According to the Beacon Hill Community Association, the neighbourhood is bounded on the east by the Greenbelt, including the Green's Creek ravine, to the south by Highway 174, and on the west by Blair Road (south of Montreal Road) and Rothwell Heights (north of Montreal Road).

Beacon Hill North had a population of 9,177 while Beacon Hill South had a population of 8,319 (17,496 total) according to the Canada 2016 Census.

== Sub-neighbourhoods ==
- Beacon Heights
- Beacon Hill North
- Beacon Hill South
- Beaconwood
- Cardinal Heights
- Rothwell Village

== History ==
According to The Historical Society of Ottawa, the community drew its name from a lighthouse in the Ottawa River, located between Upper Duck Island and Lower Duck Island. It is thought that the light from the river could be seen from the top of the hill (which is now Naskapi Drive), hence the name Beacon Hill. Today, the steel-clad foundation is the only part of the lighthouse still standing.

The 'Hill' the name refers to is actually a ridge running roughly parallel to the Ottawa River. A large area of the ridge is the municipal Ski Hill Park. An open area of the park located behind the Beacon Hill Mall on Ogilvie Road is a very popular winter sledding and skiing hill, while the remaining two thirds (approximate) of Ski Hill Park is undeveloped natural woodlands with many walking and snowshoeing trails throughout.

== Community Association ==
In the mid- to late 1970s the Beacon Hill Community Association was formed. It was disbanded for lack of interest in the late 1980s. It was later revived as the Beacon Hill North Community Association (with borders to match the name) in 2009 by a group of residents, with the main goal to rally residents to help save the local Colonel By Secondary School from being closed.

In 2010 it was returned to the Beacon Hill Community Association, again with the expanded borders to include Beacon Hills North and South.

== Schools ==
- Le Phare Elementary School (French Immersion Public)
- Robert Hopkins Public School (English/French Immersion Public)
- Henry Munro Middle School (English/French Immersion Public)
- Colonel By Secondary School (English/French Immersion Public, with International Baccalaureate Program)
- École élémentaire catholique La Vérendrye (French Catholic)
- École élémentaire publique Séraphin-Marion (French Public) now in the building of the former Lamira Dow Billings Public School which closed following the 2000-2001 school year.
- Thomas D'Arcy McGee Catholic School (English Catholic)
- Gloucester High School
- Lester B. Pearson Catholic High School
- Brother Andre Catholic School (former Elmridge Catholic)

== Toboggan Hills ==
From largest to smallest:

- Green's Creek (in Blackburn Hamlet)
- Ski Hill Park
- Loyola Park

== Notable Beacon Hill residents, past and present ==
- Grant Clitsome (NHL hockey player)
- Elizabeth Manley (Canadian Figure Skater)
- Tom Cruise (who was known as Thomas Mapother then) attended Robert Hopkins Public School then Henry Munro Middle School in the early 1970s
- Tom Green, comedian
- Bryan Adams attended Henry Munro Middle School and Colonel By Secondary School in the early 1970s
- Norm Macdonald, comedian
- Jordan Tannahill, playwright
