= Tim Tierney (politician) =

Canadian politician

Ottawa City Councillor
- Incumbent
- Assumed office December 1, 2010
- Preceded by: Michel Bellemare
- Constituency: Beacon Hill-Cyrville Ward

Personal details
- Born: October 16, 1974 (age 52) Ottawa
- Spouse: Jenny Tierney
- Education: Algonquin College

Timothy A. Tierney (born October 16, 1974) is the Ottawa city councillor of Beacon Hill-Cyrville Ward. He won the ward in the 2010 Ottawa municipal election, defeating the incumbent Michel Bellemare in a narrow contest. In the 2014 Ottawa municipal election Tierney won with 82% of the vote. In the 2022 election, he also won with 82% of the vote.

== Early life and career ==
Tierney has lived in the Beacon Hill North neighbourhood since 1995. Prior to being elected, he served as the president of the Beacon Hill North Community Association, where he played an integral part in keeping Colonel By Secondary School open during the Ottawa East Secondary Accommodation Study in 2008 and 2009.

== Political career ==
Tierney's past political involvement included working on the Rainer Bloess Liberal nomination campaign in 2009 in Ottawa-Orleans and many other campaigns including Gerard Kennedy, Paul Martin, and Terry Kilrea.

Tierney is the chair of the Information Technology Sub-Committee and a member of the Transit Commission, Transportation Committee, Ottawa Public Library Board, Ottawa Community Housing, and Pineview Municipal Golf Course Board of Management. He is also a longtime board member of the Gloucester Centre Minor Hockey Association, currently serving as vice president.

In 2012, Tierney was elected to the Federation of Canadian Municipalities board of directors and is currently the third vice-president.

In 2021, Tierney leaked a confidential memo related to a sinkhole lawsuit on how the City of Ottawa was planning to sue its insurers for the Confederation Line project. Tierney told council colleagues that he'd been "careless," but said he didn't share the information intentionally. Tierney faced no sanction.

Tierney endorsed Bonnie Crombie in the 2023 Ontario Liberal Party leadership election.

=== Corruption scandal ===
On November 23, 2018, Tierney was charged by the Ontario Provincial Police for corrupt election practices. He was alleged to have offered donations to prevent Michael Schurter, a political staffer working for Peter Kent, from running against him in Beacon Hill-Cyrville Ward in the 2018 Ottawa municipal election. Tierney denied any allegations of wrongdoing. On September 11, 2019, all charges were withdrawn by the Crown after Tierney apologized in court and gave up two months of his city councillor salary. Michael Schurter reacted by saying: “Last election Tim ran on his reputation and that’s something he may not be able to do again in the future".

== Electoral record ==
2022 Ottawa municipal election: Beacon Hill-Cyrville
Candidate	Popular vote			Expenditures
Candidate	Votes	%	±%	Expenditures
Tim Tierney (X)	7,617	81.96	+0.62	$26,325.77
Miranda Gray	1,265	13.61	–	$374.37
Nicolas Castro	411	4.42	–	$90.62
Total valid votes	9,293	97.14		
Total rejected, unmarked and declined votes	274	2.86		
Turnout	9,567	40.79	+2.73	
Eligible voters	23,452			
Note: Candidate campaign colours are based on the prominent colour used in campaign items (signs, literature, etc.) and are used as a visual differentiation between candidates.

2018 Ottawa municipal election: Beacon Hill-Cyrville
Candidate	Vote	%
Tim Tierney	6,730	81.34
Michael Schurter	1,544	18.66

2014 Ottawa municipal election: Beacon Hill-Cyrville
Candidate	Vote	%
Tim Tierney	7,162	82.11
Michel Tardif	518	5.94
Francesca D'Ambrosio	433	4.96
Nicolas Séguin	421	4.83
Rene Tessier	188	2.16

2010 Ottawa municipal election: Beacon Hill-Cyrville
Candidate	Votes	%
Tim Tierney	5088	49.34
Michel Bellemare	4907	47.58
O'Neil Brooke	318	3.08
