= National Capital Greenbelt =

Green belt surrounding the city of Ottawa, Ontario

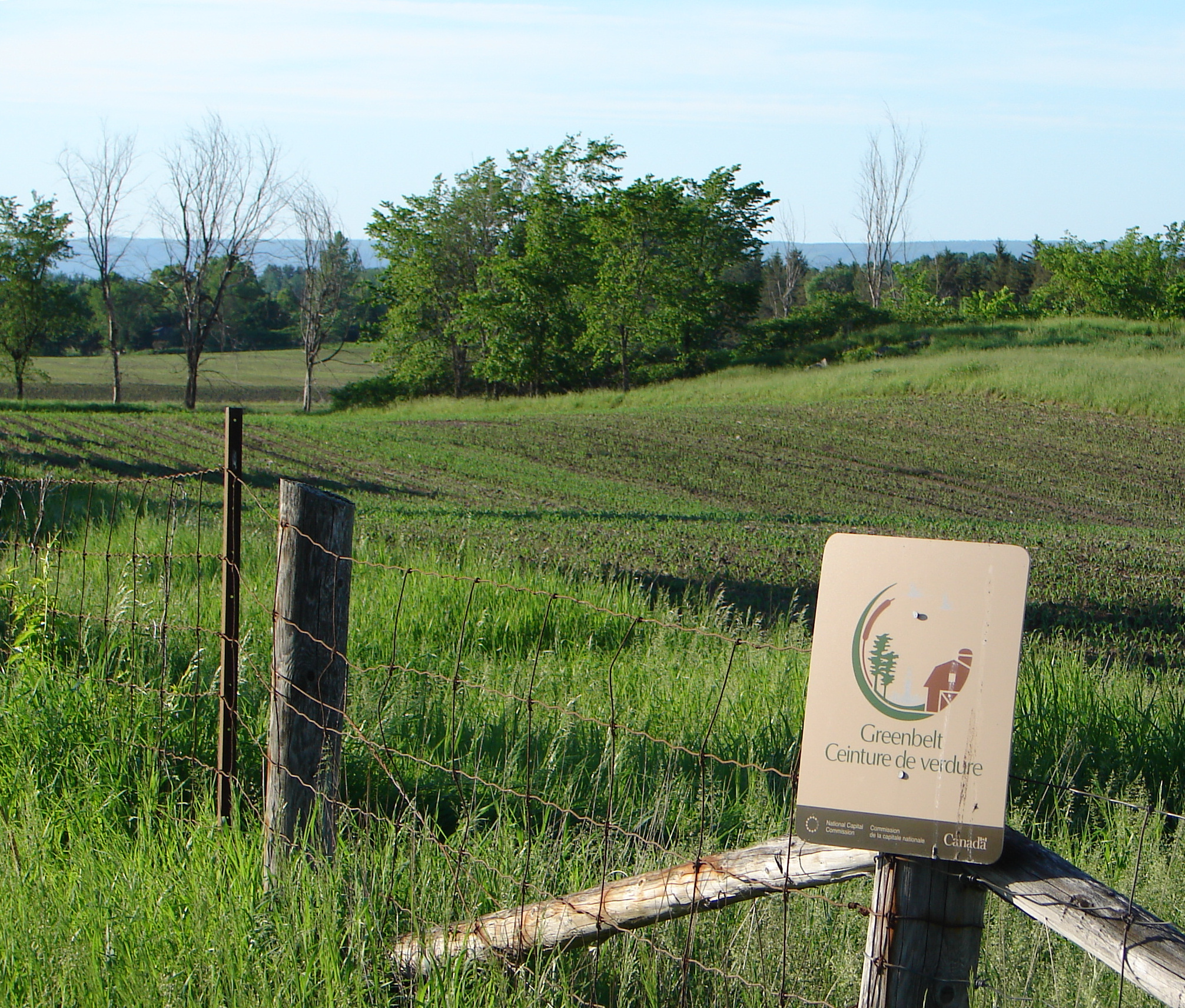

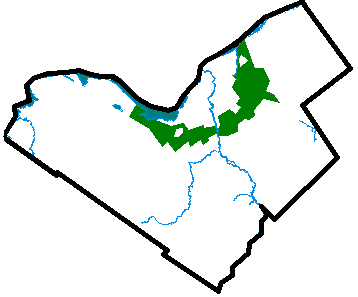
- Map of Ottawa showing the Greenbelt surrounding the urban core
- Location: Eastern Ontario, Canada
- Nearest city: Ottawa
- Area: 203.5 km^{2} (78.6 sq mi)
- Established: 1956
- Governing body: National Capital Commission
- Website: ncc-ccn.gc.ca/places/greenbelt

The National Capital Greenbelt (French: Ceinture de verdure de la capitale national) is a 203.5-square-kilometre (78.6 sq mi) protected green belt traversing Ottawa, Ontario, Canada. It includes green space, forests, farms, and wetlands from Shirleys Bay in the west and to Green's Creek in the east. It is the largest publicly owned green belt in the world and the most ecologically diverse area in Eastern Ontario. The National Capital Commission (NCC) owns and manages 149.5 square kilometres (57.7 sq mi), and the rest is held by other federal government departments and private interests. Real estate development within the Greenbelt is strictly controlled.

The Greenbelt lies within eight kilometres of Parliament Hill in downtown Ottawa and ranges in width from two to ten kilometres. It encircles many of the oldest communities in the City of Ottawa, and covers the same amount of land as the urbanized area of Ottawa that it surrounds.

== History ==
The Greenbelt was proposed by Jacques Gréber in 1950 as part of his master plan for Ottawa, and the federal government started expropriating land in 1956. The majority of the lands were purchased by 1966 at an approximate cost of CA$40 million (in 1966 dollars), of which around 40% were acquired through expropriation.

Its original purpose included the prevention of urban sprawl (which was threatening the rural areas surrounding the city), as well as to provide open space for the future development of farms, natural areas and government campuses. At the time, the greenbelt was "intended to circumscribe an area large enough for the accommodation of some 500,000 persons. The inner limit was chosen by considering what area could be economically provided with municipal services."

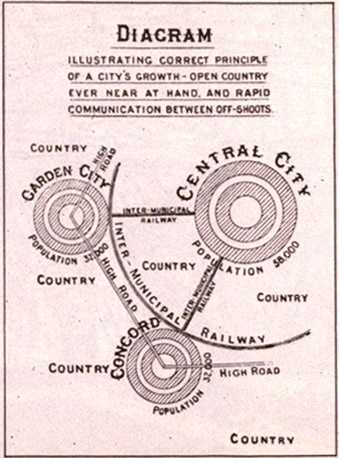
Ebenezer Howard's influential 1902 diagram, illustrating urban growth through garden city "off-shoots"

Growth beyond the 500,000 to 600,000 limit anticipated within the Greenbelt was planned to take place in satellite towns in rural areas beyond it, although these areas were not designated by the master plan. This proposal to build satellite towns was based on Ebenezer Howard's 1898 Social Cities scheme and also drew on Patrick Abercrombie's "Greater London Plan", especially in the proposals for the Greenbelt to be implemented by development regulations.

Prior to the completion of the Greber Plan, the Ottawa Area Planning Board (OAPB) was created in 1947 to control unregulated suburban expansion. Despite its creation, suburban townships continued to approve low-density subdivisions without municipal services. In an effort to stop low-density suburban expansion, the City of Ottawa successfully annexed rural township lands to the future proposed inside boundary of the Greenbelt in 1948. The rural townships fought the annexation and continued to refuse to zone parts of their land to accommodate a Greenbelt after their loss. After six years of conflict with the rural townships, it became clear that unlike in the Greater London Plan, it would not be possible to establish a Greenbelt using Ontario and Quebec planning legislation alone. As a result, in 1956 the Government of Canada decided to buy or expropriate Greenbelt lands as required.

Despite these efforts, research planner H.A. Hossé noted as early as 1960 that there were signs that the Ottawa Greenbelt would not be able to restrain urban sprawl. The surrounding rural townships of Nepean and Gloucester retained zoning jurisdiction on lands outside the Greenbelt and encouraged their continuing development to increase municipal tax revenues. The Greenbelt was easily crossed by car in a few minutes, and this did not stop civil servants from seeking more affordable homes outside of it. He concluded that without an active program of planning control by the local municipalities involved, or by the province, growth would continue unabated outside the Greenbelt.

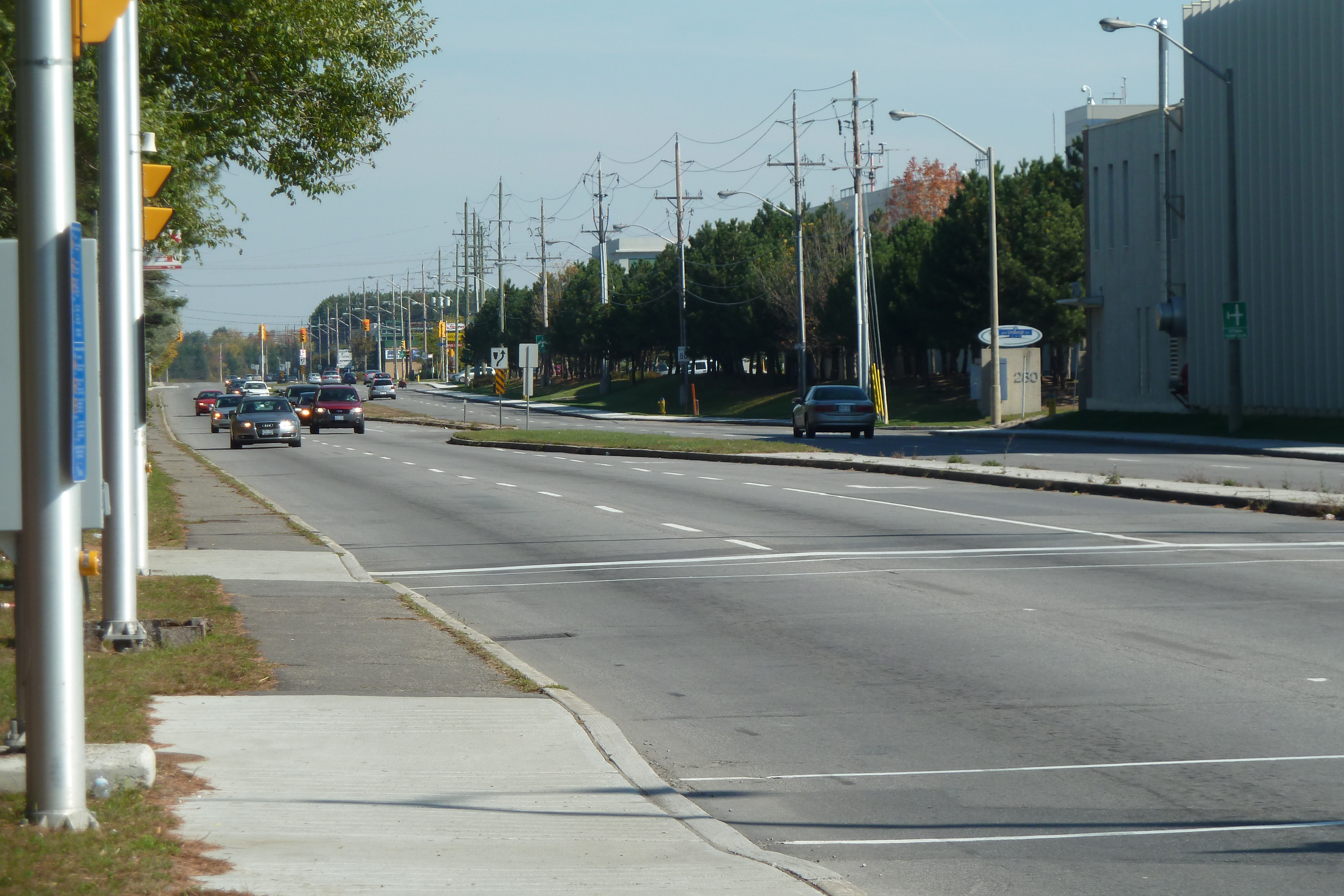
Hunt Club Road (2011)

At the same time the Greenbelt was being assembled, developers were purchasing land beyond the belt for future use. The population grew much faster than Gréber had predicted, and his population forecast for the year 2000 was reached as early as 1970. In 1965, the suburb of Kanata was built west of the Greenbelt in the Township of March, and the suburban communities of Orleans (Gloucester/Cumberland Township) and Barrhaven (Nepean Township) grew up quickly to the east and south of Greenbelt lands, even before the inner suburbs had filled out. Highway development followed this suburban population growth, with Highway 417 to Montreal built through the eastern Greenbelt in 1975 and Highway 416 extended south through the southwestern Greenbelt in 1996.

The rapid population increase encouraged suburban politicians to press for more development outside Greenbelt lands. With the formation of the Regional Municipality of Ottawa–Carleton in 1969, suburban and rural politicians, who had a majority on the regional council used their power to press for urban expansion. Urban boundaries were continually expanded to incorporate further development on former farmland. This general pattern continued following municipal amalgamation in 2001.

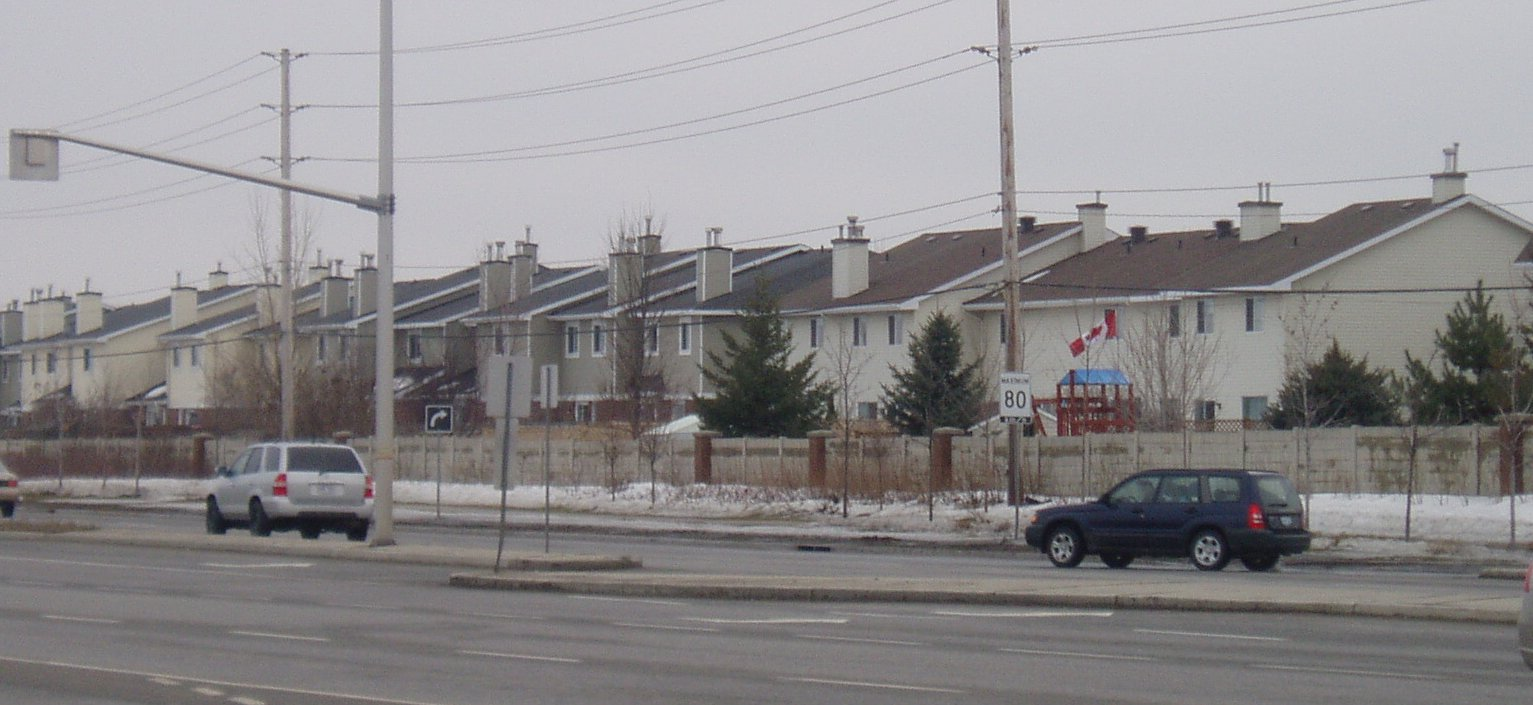
Barrhaven (2006)

The result of these ongoing policies can be seen in local settlement patterns. In 1971, 90 per cent of Ottawa homes were inside the Greenbelt. Seven per cent were in rural areas and only three per cent were in the suburbs. By 2007, only 65 per cent of households were inside the Greenbelt, while suburbs were home to 26 per cent of the city's total households. In that time, 60 per cent of Ottawa's population growth was outside the Greenbelt. From 2005 to 2016 it was typical for there to be roughly twice as many housing starts outside the Greenbelt than inside.

One outcome of this pattern of development outside the Greenbelt is an increased infrastructure burden on the city. While homes inside the Greenbelt pay the full cost of their development, it has been estimated that those in the suburbs receive the equivalent of a CA$5,000 taxpayer subsidy due the gap between development charges and infrastructure costs to the city. Urban planner and geographer Barry Wellar has estimated that this subsidy may be as high as CA$25,000 per house when the long-term maintenance costs of roads, bridges, pipes and transit equipment are factored in.

== Development ==
The City of Ottawa is undergoing an Official Plan Review which, among other things, examines the need for additional land for urban purposes. It considers whether a discussion of urban land should include the option of some development within the Greenbelt and it is intended that this discussion will feed into the NCC’s review of the Greenbelt Master Plan. All views expressed in [the] White Paper are those of the City of Ottawa and not those of the National Capital Commission which owns and operates the Greenbelt. The City of Ottawa has identified more than 13,700 acres (55 km^{2}) of the Greenbelt, worth about $1.6 billion, that could be developed, and in their view, without damaging its overall integrity. Environment Minister Jim Prentice, opposed development in what he considered an important part of the city's heritage. Prentice vowed to fight any such move.

In 2020, columnist Randall Denley of the Ottawa Citizen described the Greenbelt as "a failed attempt to contain growth, not a collection of natural treasures", and supported development within the Greenbelt because "it would give the city the land capacity it requires and deliver all the environmental, transportation and practical benefits that environment groups envision", while Ottawa city staff stated "Expanding urban lands within the Greenbelt is a more efficient use of resources than beyond it."

== Conservation ==
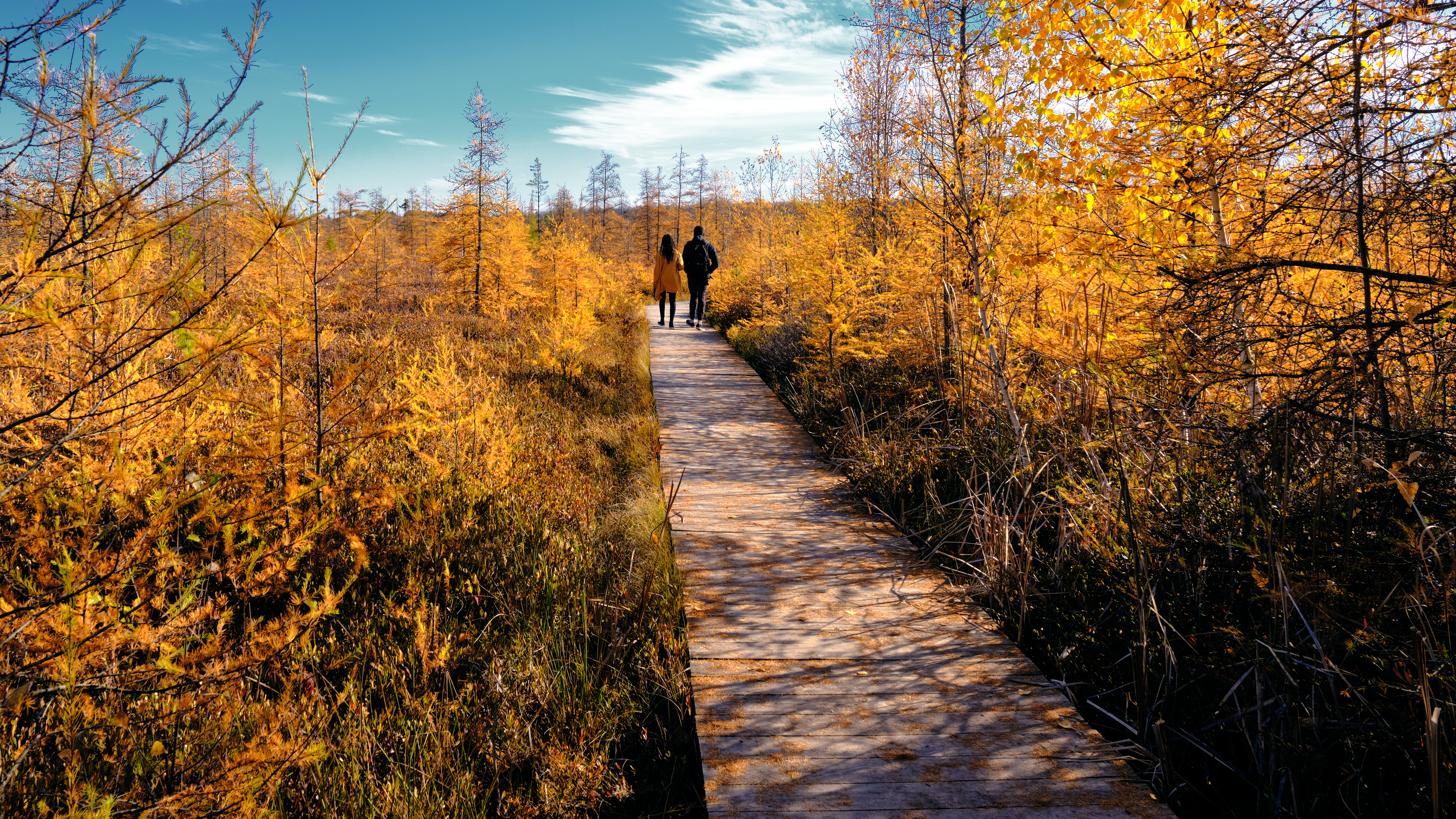
Mer Bleue Bog boardwalk

Throughout its history, the NCC has acted to preserve or enhance the natural environment of Greenbelt lands. In 1961, they entered into a 50 year forest management agreement with the Government of Ontario, which lead to the reforestation of abandoned and marginal farmland. The Pine Grove and Pinhey forests were largely the result of that initiative. In the 1970s, the ecological significance of areas such as the Mer Bleue and Stony Swamps were recognized and efforts were taken to protect them. Additional parts of Mer Bleue swamp were acquired and the overall biodiversity of the Greenbelt increased. Walking and ski trails were also created to allow for increased recreational use of these natural areas.

== Wildlife ==
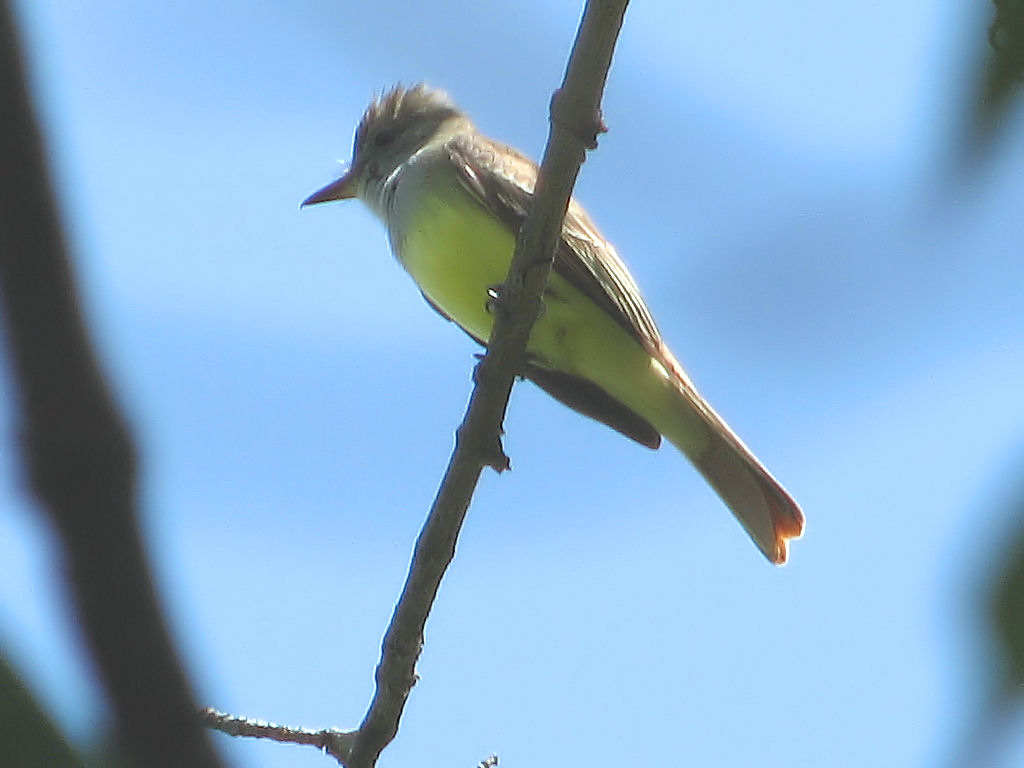
Great crested flycatcher (Myiarchus crinitus), Mer Bleue Conservation Area.

The Greenbelt is home to a variety of wildlife:

- Mammals: bat, bear, beaver, coyote, cottontail rabbit, fisher, muskrat, porcupine, raccoon, red fox, red squirrel, snowshoe hare, skunk, white-tailed deer, rarely moose
- Birds: barred owl, screech owl, great grey owl, Canada goose, sandhill crane, great blue heron, red-tailed hawk, American kestrel, spruce grouse, woodcock, blue jay, chickadee
- Insects: walking stick, praying mantis, butterflies
- Reptiles/Amphibians: common garter snake, painted turtle, snapping turtle

== Communities ==
Communities located within the Greenbelt:

- Ashdale
- Bells Corners
- Blackburn Hamlet
- Kempark
- Merivale Gardens

== Places of interest ==
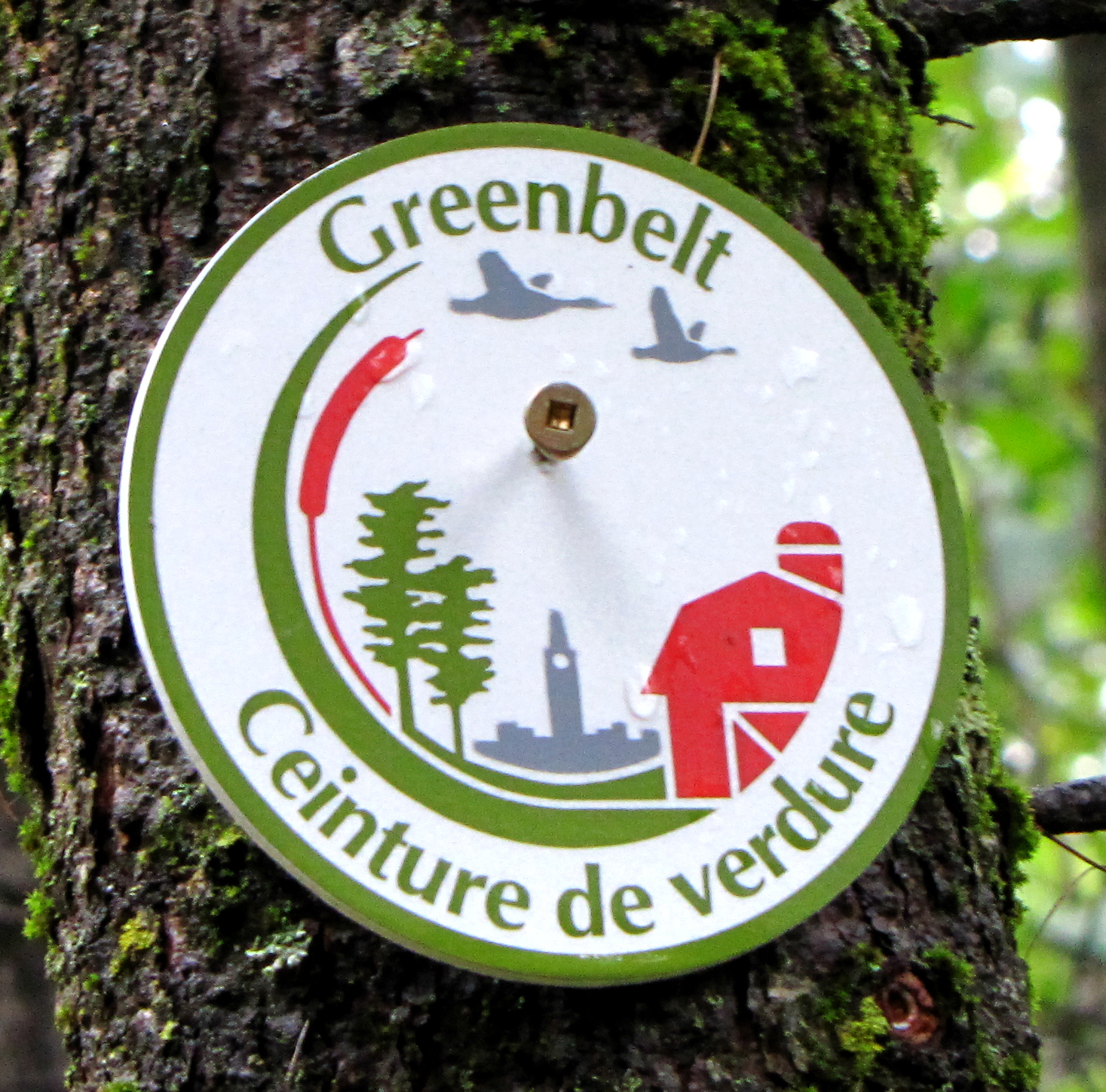
Trail marker

Places of interest within the Greenbelt are from east to west:

- Green's Creek Conservation Area – a nature reserve of a small tributary of the Ottawa River, cutting through a lush clay valley. 45°28′00″N 75°34′35″W
- Hornets Nest soccer fields – 11 soccer fields and an air-supported dome for indoor soccer. 45°26′35″N 75°34′35″W
- Pine View Golf Course – 36-hole public golf course 45°25′50″N 75°35′50″W
- Mer Bleue Bog – 33 km^{2} (13 sq mi) sphagnum peat bog and a designated wetland of international importance under the Ramsar Convention. There are some 20 km (12 mi) of walking trails, including a 1.2 km (0.75 mi) boardwalk, through a remarkable boreal-like ecosystem normally not found this far south. Stunted black spruce, tamarack, together with bog rosemary, blueberry, and cottongrass, are some of the unusual species that have adapted to the acidic waters of the bog. The Mer Bleue bog (French for Blue Sea) got its name from the autumn morning fogs that make it appear as a blue sea. 45°24′00″N 75°30′00″W
- Pine Grove Forest – 12 km^{2} (4.6 sq mi) of mixed-use forest for hiking, wildlife reserve, and forestry. 45°21′30″N 75°36′00″W
- Conroy Pit – a 1.1 km^{2} (270 acres) site on a former sand/gravel pit off Conroy Road near Hunt Club Road, now used primarily as an off-leash dog park and for tobogganing in the winter. It has several kilometres of urban forest trails and wide open areas. The north end of the pit features a large toboggan hill. 45°21′30″N 75°37′30″W
- Hylands Golf Club – 36-hole public golf course 45°19′00″N 75°38′35″W
- Macdonald-Cartier International Airport – Ottawa's main airport for domestic, international, and general aviation. 45°19′30″N 75°40′00″W
- Pinhey Forest – a large forest in Nepean with a number of walking and hiking trails, neighborhoods, and sand dunes.
- Agriculture Canada Research Farms – 17 km^{2} (6.6 sq mi) site for research in animal disease prevention and treatment. 45°19′08″N 75°45′12″W
- The Log Farm – a restored homestead from 1857, with guided tours. 45°17′59″N 75°47′50″W
- Bruce Pit – a second former sand/gravel pit off Cedarview Road between Hunt Club Road and Baseline Road. It is now used as an off-leash dog park, and has a cross-country trail system and a toboggan hill. 45°19′30″N 75°48′00″W
- Lime Kiln (Trail) – trail to remains of 19th-century Flood industrial lime kiln.45°17′13.7″N 75°48′48.8″W
- Stony Swamp Conservation Area – 20 km^{2} (7.7 sq mi) of provincially significant wetland. It is also the largest forested area within the Greenbelt and is popular for hiking and outdoor recreation. It is also the study area for the Macoun Field Club.45°18′00″N 75°50′20″W
- Wesley Clover Parks (formerly the Nepean National Equestrian Park 45°20′22″N 75°51′10″W and the Ottawa Municipal Campground 45°19′50″N 75°52′00″W) - an equestrian facility and public campground with 127 serviced sites
- The 19th Tee Driving Range – golf driving range and 18 hole mini-putt park. 45°20′43″N 75°52′38″W
- Connaught National Army Cadet Summer Training Centre – Military and cadet training centre, also used by private shooting associations. 45°21′40″N 75°54′00″W
- Shirleys Bay – an important wetland on the Ottawa River, home to migratory birds and water fowl. This location is ideally suited for bird watching. 45°23′00″N 75°55′00″W

== See also ==
- Greenbelt (Golden Horseshoe) - greenbelt surrounding the Greater Toronto Area
- Sea to Sea Green Blue Belt - greenbelt surrounding the Greater Victoria Area
