= Gloucester, Ontario =

Suburb of Ottawa, Ontario, Canada

Gloucester
- Former municipality
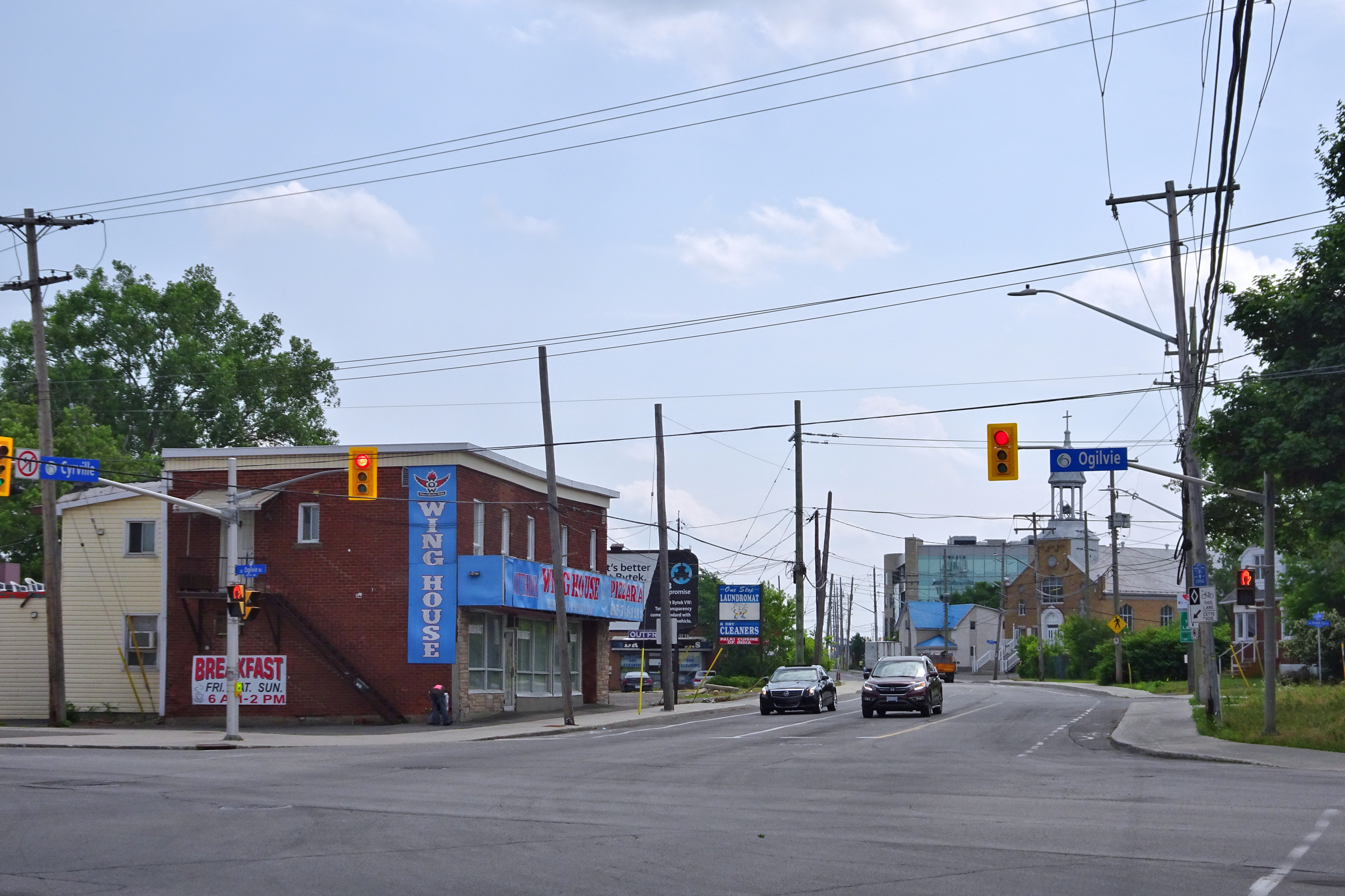
- The Cyrville neighbourhood in the former city of Gloucester.

- Flag

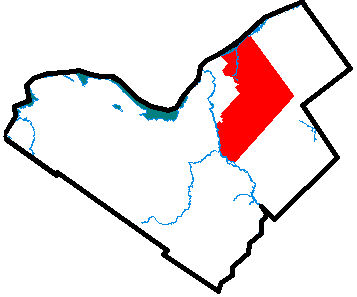
- The limits of the former City of Gloucester within the current City of Ottawa
- Coordinates: 45°26′07″N 75°36′33″W
- Country: Canada
- Province: Ontario
- Municipality: Ottawa
- Established: 1792
- Incorporated: 1850 (township); 1981 (city)
- Amalgamated: 2001

Government
  - City councillors: George Darouze; Jessica Bradley; Laura Dudas; Steve Desroches; Tim Tierney
  - Members of Parliament: Mona Fortier; David McGuinty
  - Members of Provincial Parliament: Lucille Collard; John Fraser

Area
  - Land: 298.5 km^{2} (115.3 sq mi)

Population (2021)
  - Total: 150,012
  - Density: 503/km^{2} (1,300/sq mi)
- Time zone: UTC−5 (Eastern (EST))
  - Summer (DST): UTC−4 (EDT)
- Area codes: 613, 343, 753

Gloucester (/ˈɡlɒstər/ GLOST-ər) is a former municipality and now geographic area of Ottawa, Ontario, Canada. Located east of Ottawa's inner core, it was an independent city until amalgamated with the Regional Municipality of Ottawa–Carleton in 2001 to become the new city of Ottawa. The population of Gloucester is about 150,012 people (2021 Census).

== History ==
Gloucester, originally known as Township B, was established in 1792. The first settler in the township was Braddish Billings in what is now the Billings Bridge area of Ottawa. In 1800, the township became part of Russell County, and later Carleton County in 1838. In 1850, the area was incorporated as Gloucester Township, named after Prince William Frederick, Duke of Gloucester and Edinburgh. Over the years, parts of Gloucester Township were annexed by the expanding city of Ottawa. Gloucester was incorporated as a city in 1981 and became part of the amalgamated city of Ottawa in 2001.

=== Township, Town, and City Halls ===
- 1872–1962: Bank Street in Billings Bridge
- 1962–1987: 4550 Bank Street in Leitrim
- 1987–1997: 1400 Blair Towers Place in the Park of Commerce
- 1997–2001: 1595 Telesat Court in Pineview

=== Reeves ===
Reeves of Gloucester Township:

- 1850 James Sieveright
- 1851 John McKinnon
- 1852 Charles Billings
- 1852-1858 Peter Tompkins
- 1859-1862 Donald M. Grant
- 1863 James Brown
- 1864 Robert Blackburn
- 1865 James Sieveright
- 1866 John W. McGuire
- 1867 Peter Tompkins
- 1868–1872 Robert Cummings
- 1873 Henry Robillard
- 1874–1876 Robert Cummings
- 1877–1879 William H. Hurdman
- 1880 Robert Cummings
- 1881–1883 Alexander Robillard
- 1884–1887 Robert Cummings
- 1888–1891 James E. Spratt
- 1892–1894 Robert Hopkins
- 1895–1896 P. Cassidy
- 1897 W. Lennox
- 1898–1900 F. Caldwell
- 1901 O. Rocque
- 1902 F. Caldwell
- 1903–1912 R. Spratt
- 1913–1917 C. Hardy
- 1918–1926 R. Preston
- 1927–1930 T.A. Spratt
- 1930 R. Spratt
- 1931–1939 John Innes
- 1939 W.J. Perrault
- 1939 R. Preston
- 1940–1943 W.J. Perrault
- 1944–1945 John D. Boyce
- 1946–1947 J.B. Potvin
- 1948–1949 Alex Roger
- 1950–1951 A.E. Davidson
- 1952–1972 Earl R. Armstrong
- 1972–1978 Bob MacQuarrie
- 1978–1980 Elizabeth Stewart

=== Mayors ===
- 1981–1982 Elizabeth Stewart
- 1982–1984 Fred G. Barrett
- 1984–1985 Mitch Owens
- 1985–1991 Harry Allen
- 1991–2001 Claudette Cain

== Demographics ==
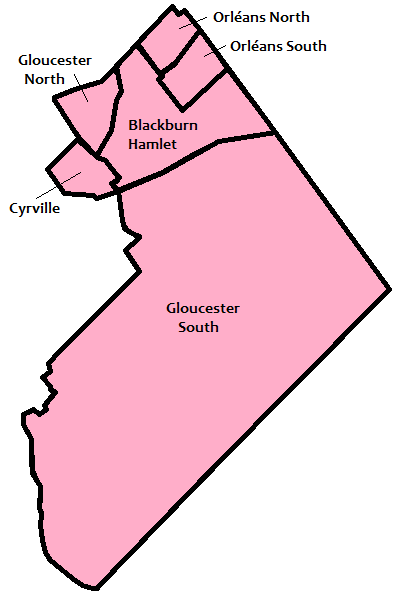
Wards in the former city of Gloucester used 1994—1997

Historical census populations – Gloucester, Ontario

| Year | Pop. | ±% |
|---|---|---|
| 1871 | 4,785 | — |
| 1881 | 6,254 | +30.7% |
| 1891 | 6,823 | +9.1% |
| 1901 | 7,778 | +14.0% |
| 1911 | 7,075 | −9.0% |
| 1921 | 8,397 | +18.7% |
| 1931 | 8,412 | +0.2% |
| 1941 | 9,871 | +17.3% |

| Year | Pop. | ±% |
|---|---|---|
| 1951 | 6,473 | −34.4% |
| 1956 | 13,598 | +110.1% |
| 1961 | 18,301 | +34.6% |
| 1966 | 23,222 | +26.9% |
| 1971 | 37,154 | +60.0% |
| 1976 | 56,516 | +52.1% |
| 1981 | 72,859 | +28.9% |
| 1986 | 89,810 | +23.3% |

| Year | Pop. | ±% |
|---|---|---|
| 1991 | 101,677 | +13.2% |
| 1996 | 104,022 | +2.3% |
| 2001 | 110,264 | +6.0% |
| 2006 | 114,604 | +3.9% |
| 2011 | 116,282 | +1.5% |
| 2016 | 122,972 | +5.8% |
| 2021 | 150,012 | +22.0% |

Population counts are not adjusted for boundary changes.
Source: Statistics Canada

| Neighbourhood | Population (2021) | Population (2016) | Population (2011) | Population (2006) | Area (km^{2}.) | Density (per km^{2}.) | Census Tracts |
|---|---|---|---|---|---|---|---|
| Beacon Hill North | 9,342 | 9,177 | 9,007 | 8,819 | 5.434 | 1719.176 | 5050120.03, 5050120.02 |
| Beacon Hill South | 7,746 | 7,319 | 7,312 | 6,953 | 2.258 | 3430.469 | 5050121.01, 5050121.02 |
| Blackburn Hamlet | 8,173 | 8,167 | 8,237 | 8,527 | 2.413 | 3387.070 | 5050125.01, 5050125.02 |
| Blossom Park | 14,621 | 14,190 | 14,060 | 12,361 | 6.193 | 2360.891 | 5050123.01, 5050123.03, 5050123.04 |
| Bradley Estates | 5,385 | | | | 4.397 | 1224.81 | 5050125.11 |
| Chapel Hill | 8,124 | 8,293 | 8,521 | 8,566 | 3.398 | 2390.818 | 5050125.07, 5050125.04 |
| Chapel Hill South-Trailsedge | 8,441 | | | | 5.509 | 1532.359 | 5050125.10 |
| Chateau Neuf | 8,278 | 8,407 | 8,579 | 8,724 | 2.051 | 4036.080 | 5050125.08, 5050125.09 |
| Convent Glen | 6,499 | 6,456 | 6,572 | 6,568 | 4.006 | 1622.317 | 5050124.04, 5050124.01 |
| Cyrville-Carson Grove | 9,278 | 8,532 | 8,662 | 8,173 | 3.353 | 2767.074 | 5050122.01, 5050122.03 |
| Elizabeth Park-Kemp Park | 4,007 | 3,410 | 3,902 | 3,548 | 19.687 | 203.535 | 5050127.00 |
| Hiawatha Park | 4,779 | 4,841 | 4,821 | 5,138 | 4.418 | 1081.711 | 5050124.03 |
| Leitrim-Findlay Creek | 14,089 | 8,865 | 4,486 | 1,333 | 17.346 | 812.233 | 5050126.03 |
| Orleans Village | 5,266 | 5,229 | 5,195 | 5,497 | 1.984 | 2654.234 | 5050125.05 |
| Orleans Wood | 3,982 | 3,976 | 3,851 | 3,892 | 1.564 | 2546.036 | 5050124.02 |
| Pine View | 6,652 | 6,463 | 6,505 | 6,622 | 3.698 | 1798.810 | 5050122.02 |
| Riverside South | 12,582 | 12,342 | 10,908 | 6,844 | 14.136 | 890.068 | 5050126.05, 5050126.06 |
| Rothwell Heights | 1,643 | 1,664 | 1,686 | 1,673 | 1.593 | 1031.387 | 5050120.01 |
| Rural Gloucester (incl. south Riverside South) | 11,125 | 5,641 | 3,978 | 4,732 | 195.066 | 57.032 | 5050126.04, 5050125.03 |

== Places of interest ==
=== Parks ===
- The Greenbelt
- Mer Bleue Bog

=== Shopping ===
- Billings Bridge Shopping Centre
- Gloucester Centre
- Place d'Orleans
- South Keys Shopping Centre

=== Museums ===
- Billings Estate National Historic Site
- Canada Science and Technology Museum

== Education ==
Anglophone secular public schools are operated by the Ottawa-Carleton District School Board. Anglophone Catholic public schools are operated by the Ottawa Catholic School Board. French secular public schools are operated by the Conseil des écoles publiques de l'Est de l'Ontario (CÉPEO). The Conseil des écoles catholiques du Centre-Est (CECCE), formerly known as the Conseil des écoles catholiques de langue française du Centre-Est (CECLFCE), operates the French Catholic public schools.

The CECCE has its headquarters in Gloucester. The predecessor school district, the Conseil des écoles catholiques de langue française de la région d'Ottawa-Carleton (CECLF), had its headquarters in the current CECCE headquarters.

Collège La Cité is the only post-secondary institution in Gloucester.

== See also ==
- List of townships in Ontario
