= Laurier (disambiguation) =

Laurier is the French word for the laurel plant, and is a francophone family name, common in Canada.

Sir Wilfrid Laurier (20 November 1841 – 17 February 1919) was the seventh Prime Minister of Canada from 11 July 1896 to 5 October 1911. As Canada's first francophone prime minister, Laurier is often considered one of the country's greatest statesmen.

Laurier can also refer to:

== People ==
- Laurier (name)
- Bénigne Basset Des Lauriers, early settler of New France, notary, surveyor
- Guerard des Lauriers, Catholic theologian and bishop

== Politics ==
- Laurier Liberals, those Liberals (including Sir Wilfrid) who did not take part in the World War I-era coalition with the Conservatives
- Macdonald-Laurier Institute, a think-tank
- Laurier (federal electoral district), a former Canadian federal electoral district in Montreal
- Laurier (provincial electoral district), a former Quebec provincial electoral district in Montreal
- Laurier-Dorion, a Quebec provincial electoral district in Montreal
- Laurier—Sainte-Marie, Canadian federal electoral district in Montreal
- Laurier—Outremont, a former Quebec provincial electoral district in Montreal

== Education ==
- Wilfrid Laurier University, in Waterloo, Ontario
  - Laurier Brantford, an affiliated campus from the University based in Waterloo
  - Wilfrid Laurier University Press, publishing house
  - Wilfrid Laurier University Students' Union
- Sir Wilfrid Laurier School Board in Southern Quebec
- Sir Wilfrid Laurier Secondary School, London, Ontario
- Sir Wilfrid Laurier Secondary School, Ottawa, Ontario
- Laurier Macdonald High School, Montreal
- Sir Wilfrid Laurier Elementary School, Vancouver
- Sir Wilfrid Laurier Public School, Brampton, Ontario
- Sir Wilfrid Laurier Collegiate Institute, Toronto
- Laurier Annex, Vancouver

== Geographical places ==
- Laurier-Station, Quebec, a village
- Laurier, Washington, a community in Washington State on US 395 just south of the Canada–US border
- Laurier, Manitoba, an unincorporated community
- Rural Municipality of Laurier No. 38, Saskatchewan, a rural municipality
- Laurier Heights, Edmonton, a neighbourhood
- Mont-Laurier, a town in Quebec
- Mount Sir Wilfrid Laurier, in British Columbia
- Laurier, Ontario, a local services board
- Graham-Laurier Provincial Park, British Columbia

== Transportation infrastructure ==
- Laurier Station (disambiguation) (several)
  - Laurier, a Montreal Metro station
  - Laurier Transitway Station, an OC Transpo Transitway BRT station
  - Laurier station (Manitoba), a Via Rail station
- Laurier Avenue (disambiguation) (several)
  - Laurier Avenue in Ottawa, Ontario, Canada
  - Laurier Avenue, in Montreal, Quebec, Canada
- Rue Laurier, in Gatineau, Quebec, Canada
- Laurier Bridge (disambiguation) (several)
  - Laurier Avenue Bridge in Ottawa
  - Laurier Railway Bridge in Montreal
- Mont-Laurier Airport

== Buildings and structures ==
- CCGS Sir Wilfrid Laurier, a ship
- Château Laurier, a hotel in Ottawa
- Esplanade Laurier, an office building in Ottawa
- Wilfrid Laurier Memorial, a monument in Montreal
- Laurier House, a National Historic Site in Ottawa
- Laurier Québec, a shopping mall in Quebec City

== Other ==
- Laurier Palace Theatre fire, a 1927 fire in Montreal
- Cyprès et lauriers, a musical composition by Camille Saint-Saëns
- Sir Laurier d'Arthabaska, a cheese
- Roman Catholic Diocese of Mont-Laurier, a religious see

== See also ==
- Deloria, a Native American surname derived from Des Laurier
