= Nicholas Street =

Street in Ottawa, Canada

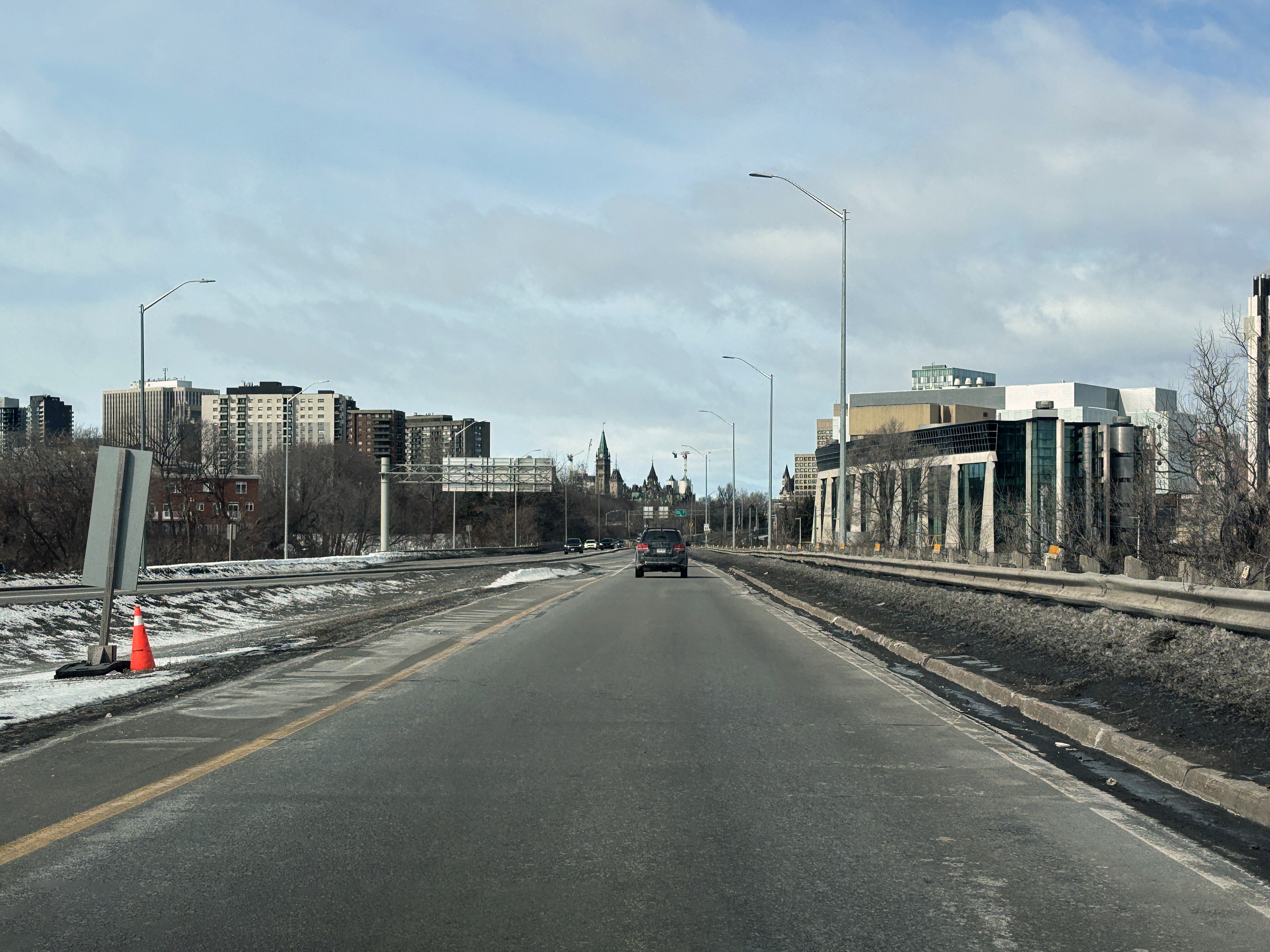
Nicholas St near University of Ottawa in 2025

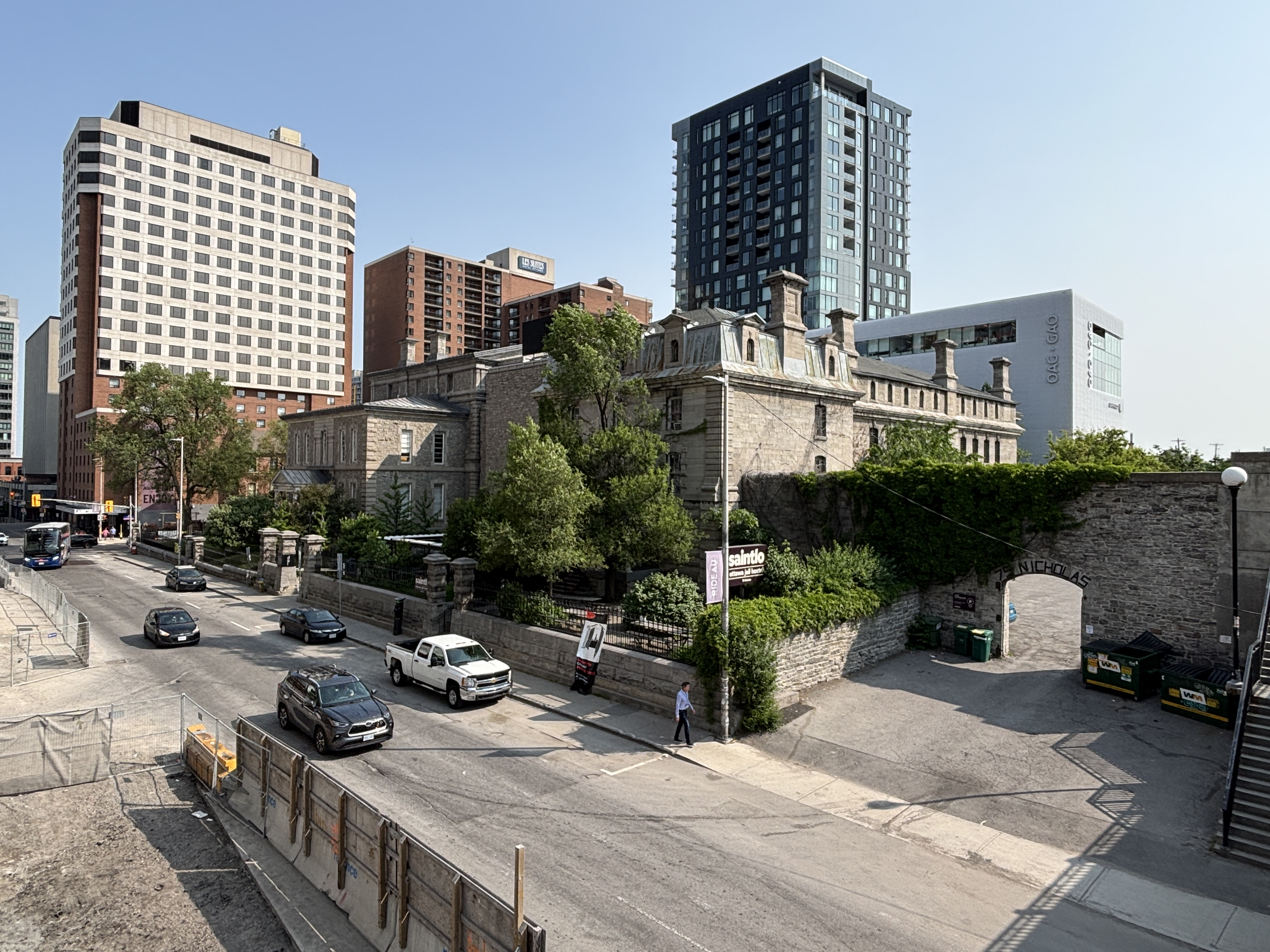
Ottawa Jail Hostel at 75 Nicholas Street.

Nicholas Street is an arterial road in the central area of Ottawa, Ontario which connects Highway 417 with the downtown core. Despite being a municipal road, the street is designated as part of Canada's National Highway System, as part of an interconnecting route between Highway 417 and Quebec Autoroute 5 in Gatineau.

The southern section of the road is a freeway between the Queensway (Highway 417) interchange and Laurier Avenue intersection. Between Laurier and Daly Avenue, Nicholas is a one-way southbound road, while traffic northbound from Laurier is diverted to Waller Street. Rideau Street is the northern terminus of Nicholas Street.

Landmarks along this road include the Rideau Centre shopping centre and the University of Ottawa.

The Rideau Canal parallels Nicholas Street to the west. Colonel By Drive is situated between the Canal and Nicholas. The OC Transpo bus Transitway is a parallel facility situated to the east for much of Nicholas Street's length.

It is named for Nicholas Sparks, a prominent early citizen of Ottawa.

== Major intersections from north to south ==
- Rideau Street
- Besserer Street
- Daly Avenue
- Waller Street, access to Mackenzie King Bridge
- Laurier Avenue
- Queensway (Highway 417)
