= Laurier Avenue (disambiguation) =

Laurier Avenue is a street in Ottawa, Canada.

Laurier Avenue may also refer to:

- Laurier Avenue (Montreal)

== See also ==
- Laurier (disambiguation)
- Rue Laurier, in Gatineau, Quebec, Canada
