= Laurier Bridge =

Laurier Bridge may refer to:

- Laurier Avenue Bridge in Ottawa
- Laurier Railway Bridge in Montreal

== See also ==
- Laurier (disambiguation)
