= Canadian Joint Forces Command =

- Commandement de forces interarmées du Canada
- Active: 25 November 2025–Present
- Country: Canada
- Branch: Canadian Armed Forces
- Type: Unified combatant command
- Role: Joint operations Drone warfare
- Size: 10,000 servicemen
- Part of: Canadian Armed Forces
- Garrison/HQ: NDHQ Carling, Ottawa
- Nickname: CJFC

Commanders
- Commander: Lieutenant-General Darcy Molstad, CD

The Canadian Joint Forces Command (CJFC; French: Commandement de forces interarmées du Canada, CFIC) is a command of the Canadian Armed Forces, established on November 25, 2025. The CJFC is mandated to improve and manage leadership and coordination for joint military capabilities. It will also be in charge of overseeing drone warfare and integrated air/missile defence. This makes Canada the 3rd country after Ukraine and Russia to have a separate military branch overseeing drone warfare.

The command is based at NDHQ Carling.

== History ==
On November 25, 2025, the Canadian Department of National Defence (DND) announced the formation of the CJFC. Lieutenant-General Darcy Molstad was appointed as the first commander of the CJFC alongside Chief Warrant Officer Donovan Crawford. The formation of the command was based on lessons from the war in Ukraine. These include the use of dual-use technologies and communication systems with the use of "uncrewed systems and autonomy and counter-uncrewed systems". (Note: Uncrewed systems refer to drones in drone warfare.) It was also due to concerns from the war that the need for a joint command was seriously considered for commanding units that are not under the army, navy, air force or special forces.

In an interview with CTV News's Your Morning on December 8, 2025, Lt. Gen. Molstad stated that while combat operations have an "army, navy, air force component to them... it's the joint capabilities that are actually making the big difference".

On December 4, 2025, the Ottawa Citizen reported that the command will be based at NDHQ Carling. It also reported that the organizations under CJFC will stay in their current locations instead of moving to Carling.

== Organization ==
According to Lt. Gen. Molstad, CJFC's size is around 10,000 personnel.

The CJFC commands the following:

- Chief of Combat Systems Integration
- Canadian Joint Warfare Centre
- Canadian Forces Health Services Group
- Joint Information and Intelligence Fusion Centre
- Canadian Forces Military Police (Note: The unit will maintain operational independence according to guidelines in the National Defence Act, but the CJFC will provide support.)

The following functions are under the CJFC for some units in the CAF for accountability purposes:

- Royal Canadian Air Force – Integrated air/missile defence
- Assistant Deputy Minister (ADM) Infrastructure & Environment – Joint Engineering
- Digital Services Group – Joint Communications & Information Systems
