= Major-General George R. Pearkes Building =

Military office building in Ottawa, Canada

Coordinates: 45.423339°N 75.68924°W

- The Major-General George R. Pearkes Building in 2026
- Interactive map of the Major-General George R. Pearkes Building area

General information
- Type: Head office
- Architectural style: Modern, Brutalist
- Location: 101 Colonel By Drive, Ottawa, Ontario, Canada
- Construction started: 1969
- Completed: 1974

Design and construction
- Architect: Smith Carter Parkin

The Major-General George R. Pearkes Building (often abbreviated as just Pearkes, French: Édifice Major-Général G. R. Pearkes) is an office building located downtown Ottawa, Ontario, Canada. It is the principal location of Canada's National Defence Headquarters (NDHQ); while NDHQ comprises a collection of offices spread across the National Capital Region, the Pearkes Building is its primary base. Located at 101 Colonel By Drive, it is often referred to as '101 Col By'.

As of 2022, the building is occupied by senior defence and military staff, procurement and policy officials, intelligence specialists, legal affairs and staff involved in infrastructure.

== History ==
The building, named after Major-General George R. Pearkes, was constructed between 1969 and 1974, and was originally intended for use by the Department of Transport. When a planned National Defence Headquarters complex on the LeBreton Flats was not built, however, DND acquired the Colonel By Drive structure. In 1972, the Department of Transportation moved into Place de Ville's newly completed Tower C.

The concept for the group of buildings was developed by French town planner Jacques Gréber immediately after World War II at the invitation of Prime Minister William Lyon Mackenzie King. Gréber, a proponent of boulevards and highways as opposed to rail corridors, advised that the city redevelop the east bank of the Rideau Canal which was, at that time, covered with railway tracks leading to Ottawa Union Station.

This design was accomplished with the removal of the station tracks and relocation of passenger rail service to a new suburban station; the Ottawa Union Station building has since become the Government Conference Centre. The remaining land that contained the coach yard for Ottawa Union Station was vacant and ready for developments that would contain the Pearkes Building and the Rideau Centre.

Architects John C. Parkin, Searle, Wilby, and Rowland designed the buildings in the then-popular Brutalist style. They were conceived as the first phase of the planned redevelopment, the Rideau Centre, which opened in 1983, being the second phase.

=== Relocation ===
The Pearkes Building underwent extensive renovations from the mid-1990s as each floor was gutted to replace the hodge podge of outdated offices and furnishings dating to the building's opening in 1974. Modular office furnishings produced by CORCAN (constructed in Canadian prisons) were installed.

By the mid-2000s it became apparent that the NDHQ complex at the Pearkes Building was overcrowded, forcing DND to spread some headquarters staff across the National Capital Region. Sizeable NDHQ offices have been established in the past, or are still currently located in, Place Export Canada, the Constitution Building, l'Esplanade Laurier, Louis St Laurent Building (Gatineau, Quebec) and the Berger Building, among others.

Cutbacks among high-technology companies in the Ottawa region led DND to consider buying a surplus JDS Uniphase campus in suburban Barrhaven at the intersection of Merivale Road and Prince of Wales Drive, west of the Ottawa International Airport. JDS's former Barrhaven campus comprises two large buildings with extensive computer networking capacity, and was advertised for sale at a fraction of its construction cost. The location was perceived to be far more secure, being set back from public roads, with ample parking and transit connections for the several thousand employees it was designed to support. The Royal Canadian Mounted Police now occupy this property.

As of 2017, DND was in the process of relocating some of their personnel to the former Nortel R&D facility at Carling Campus. However, DND dismissed rumours that other federal government agencies would occupy the Pearkes building; it will still be used by DND staff.

The reported relocation of additional DND personnel to NDHQ Carling was expected to be complete by 2028. By January 2022, the Pearkes building was half-empty, despite plans to have all staff relocated to NDHQ Carling for renovations to start, which would require four years to complete. In August 2023, a new operational headquarters facility is planned for construction at NDHQ Carling with contracts finalized by 2025, which would eventually allow for the eventual vacating of 101 Colonel By Drive by 2035.
