= Laurier (name) =

Laurier is both a surname and a given name. Notable people with the name include:

Surname:

- Alain Laurier, French footballer
- Jan Laurier, Dutch senator
- Lucie Laurier, actress
- Robert Laurier, Canadian lawyer and politician
- Romuald-Charlemagne Laurier, politician and half-brother of Sir Wilfrid Laurier
- Ruben Charles Laurier, Canadian physician and politician
- Wilfrid Laurier (1841–1919), Prime Minister of Canada
- Zoé Laurier, wife of Sir Wilfrid

Given name:

- Laurier J. Boisvert, president of the Canadian Space Agency
- Laurier LaPierre, Canadian senator
- Laurier Lévesque, Canadian politician
- Laurier Régnier, Canadian member of parliament
- Wilfrid Laurier McDougald, Canadian senator
