= Laurier Station =

Laurier Station or station Laurier may refer to:

- Laurier-Station, Quebec, a village in Quebec, in MRC Lotbinière
  - Laurier train station, see Laurier-Station, Quebec
- Laurier station (Montreal Metro), a station on the Orange line of the Montreal Metro
- Laurier station (OC Transpo), an Ottawa Bus Rapid Transit station
- Laurier station (Manitoba), a Via Rail station

== See also ==
- Laurier (disambiguation)
