= Laurier Avenue Bridge =

Bridge in Ottawa, Canada

Coordinates: 45°25′21″N 75°41′21″W

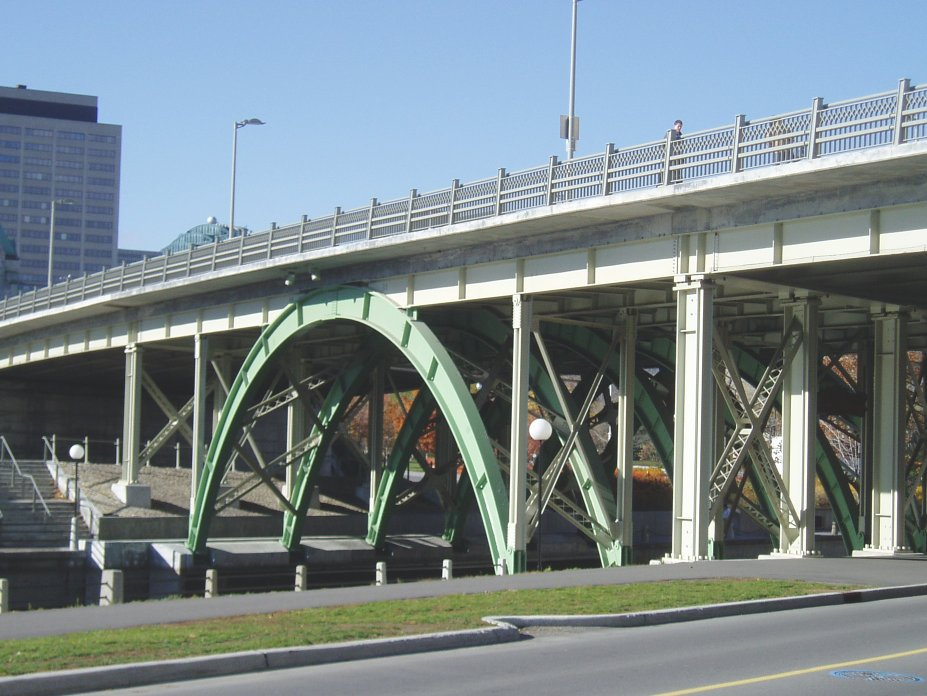
Laurier Avenue Bridge from the southeast

The Laurier Avenue Bridge is a bridge in Ottawa, Ontario, Canada. It carries Laurier Avenue over the Rideau Canal and also Colonel By Drive and Queen Elizabeth Driveway. The green steel arches makes the bridge one of the most recognizable in Ottawa. Many of the events of Winterlude are held around the bridge, and it is a common background to pictures of skaters on the canal. The southern entrance to the Department of National Defence Headquarters is located on the eastern portion of the bridge.

The first bridge in the location was constructed in 1872. The current four lane bridge was originally built in 1900 and it was extended to the west in 1945. It was originally operated by the National Capital Commission, but in 1996 it and the Mackenzie King Bridge were handed over to the city as the NCC did not have enough money for needed maintenance. In 2001, the bridge was expanded and repaired. The top surface was expanded by 50% allowing wider lanes, dedicated bike paths, and much wider sidewalks. The area around the bridge was also beautified with landscaping and new stairs connecting to the bridge.

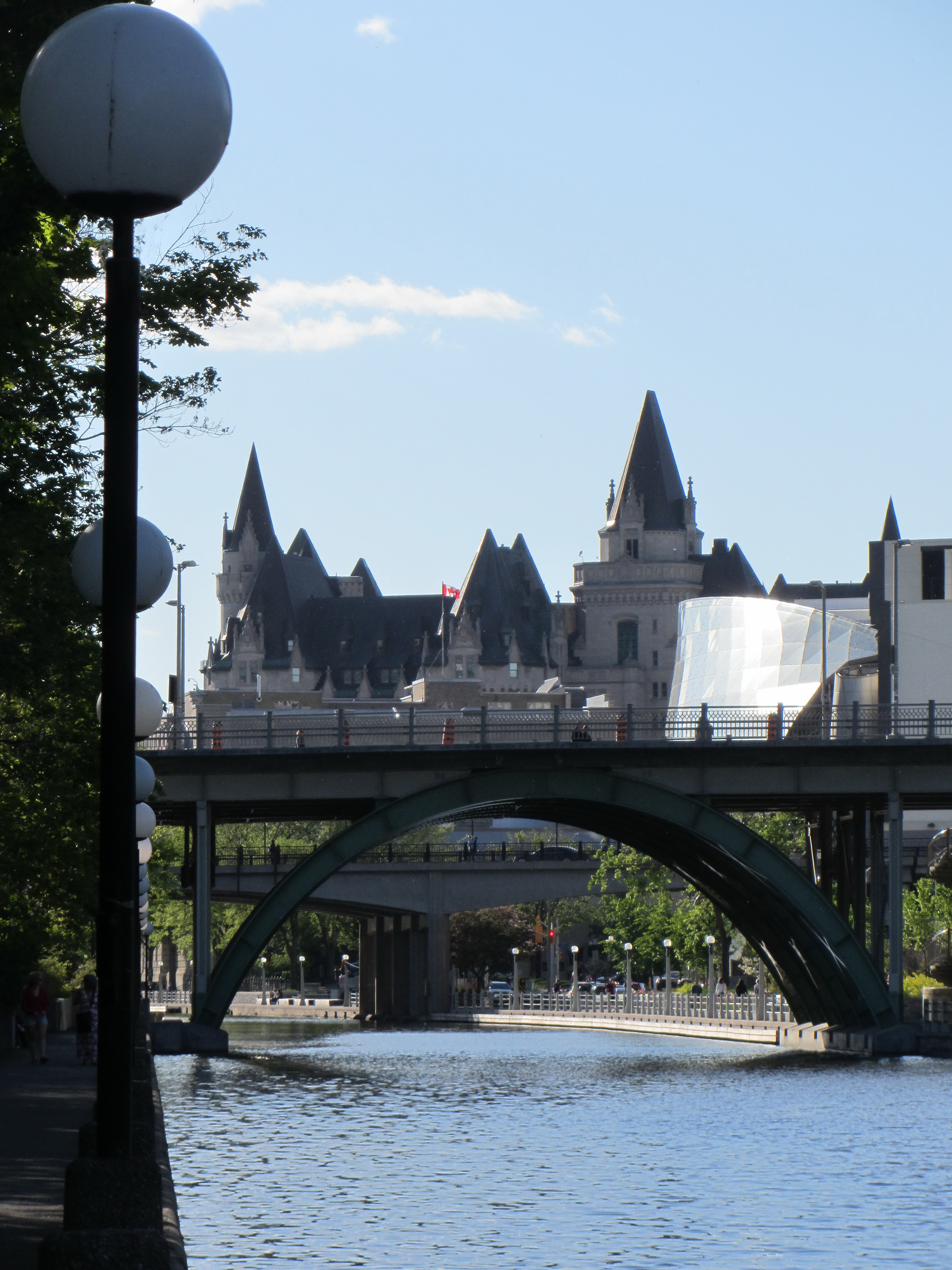

== See also ==
- Plaza Bridge (Ottawa)
