= Café Henry Burger =

Restaurant information
- Established: 1922; 104 years ago
- Closed: 2006; 20 years ago
- Location: 69 Rue Laurier, Gatineau, Quebec, Canada

Café Henry Burger was a restaurant in Gatineau, Quebec, near Ottawa.

The restaurant was opened in 1922 by Swiss immigrant Henry Burger. The business expanded to include a hotel, but was forced to close following the 1929 stock market crash. The restaurant reopened on Laval Street and in 1936 his wife Marie-Anne Monnin took over the business following Burger's death. After the building was destroyed by a fire in 1942 the restaurant moved to its final location at 69 Rue Laurier.

In 1963 Marie Burger was named Restaurateur of the Year. After her death in 1973, the business changed hands a number of times before being acquired by Robert Bourassa in 1982.

Café Henry Burger claimed to have served every prime minister since 1926, and in 2003 was indirectly involved in a public spending scandal regarding bills for meals at the restaurant claimed as expenses by public servants. In 2006 the restaurant closed.
