= NDHQ Carling =

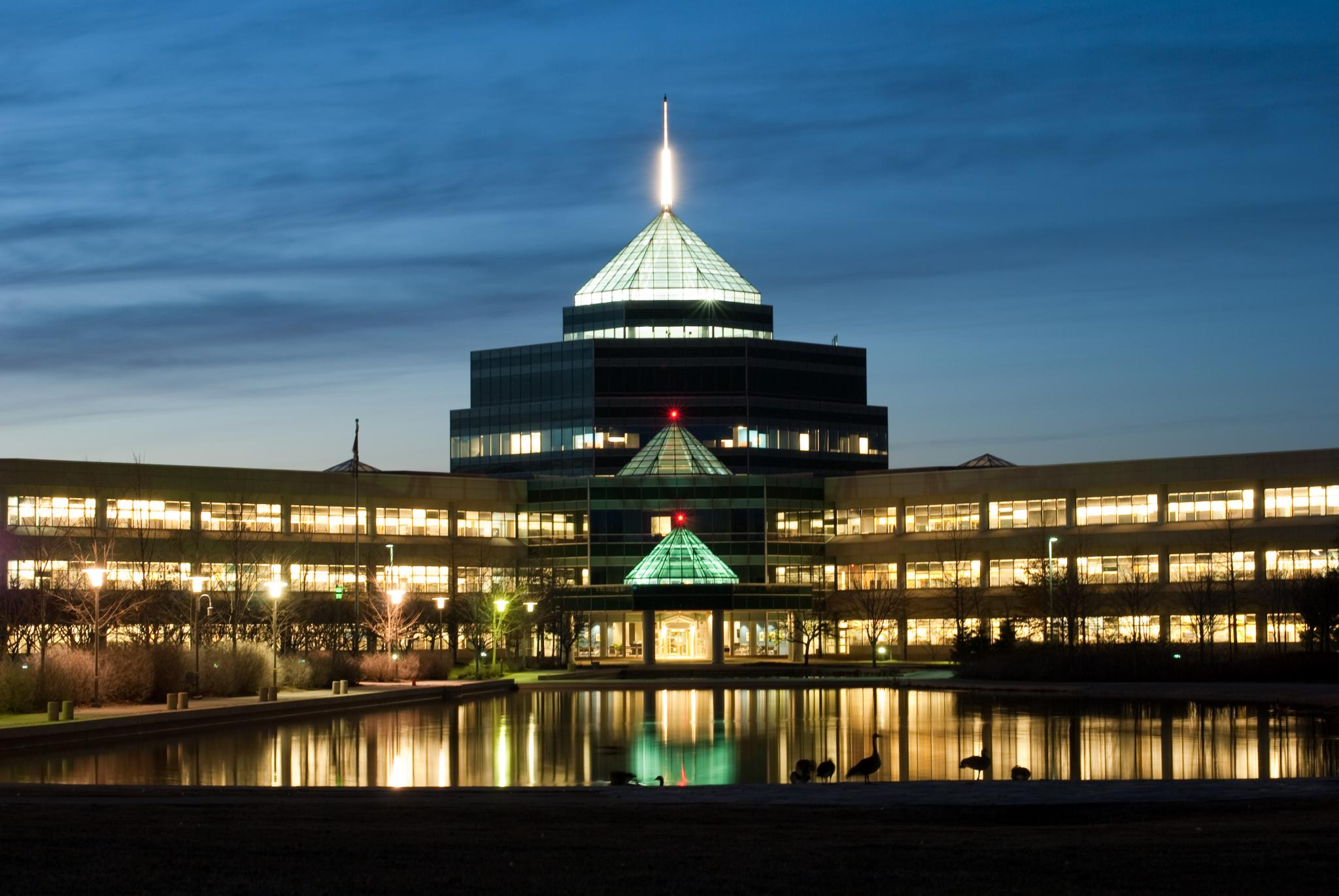
- Alternative names: Carling Campus

General information
- Type: Office building
- Architectural style: Modern
- Location: Ottawa, Ontario, Canada, 60 Moodie Drive
- Coordinates: 45°21′N 75°51′W
- Current tenants: Department of National Defence
- Construction started: 1958
- Opened: 1961
- Renovated: 1971, 1990, 1993, 1997
- Owner: Public Services and Procurement Canada

National Defence Headquarters Carling, or NDHQ Carling (originally Carling Campus), is a 148.79-hectare (367.7-acre) site containing federal government buildings near the Crystal Bay area in the west end of Ottawa, Ontario, Canada. The campus, located at the intersection of Carling Avenue and Moodie Drive, consists of 11 interconnected buildings with a total of 207,000 square metres (2,230,000 sq ft) of space. It is planned to consolidate around 8,500 persons at Carling, leading to fewer locations in Ottawa being used by DND.

The property was acquired by Public Works and Government Services Canada from its original tenant, Nortel, in December 2010, and now houses National Defence Headquarters.

During Nortel's peak period throughout the 1990s, the research and development conducted at the Nortel's Carling Campus was a catalyst for numerous high-tech spin-off and support companies in Ottawa. This development began changing Ottawa's reputation as a government city and the campus even came to represent the city's aspirations of becoming a technology hotbed like Silicon Valley.

== History ==
Northern Electric originally acquired the site for their Northern Electric Research and Development Laboratories and built two small research buildings in 1960. In 1971, Bell Canada and Northern Electric combined their R&D organizations and formed Bell-Northern Research, headquartered at the Carling site. Starting with just 42 engineers, the site was quickly expanded to house 800 people five years later.

Nortel assumed a majority share in Bell-Northern Research in 1996, and the site became part of the Nortel R&D organization. At its peak, the campus had some 10,000 employees, even hosting North America's largest recreational softball league. To accommodate this growth, an expansion project was undertaken in 1997, based on a new campus master plan and an expedited, harmonized development approval process. At Nortel's peak in 2001, the campus housed 8,500 employees.

After Nortel went bankrupt in 2009, its research divisions were sold to Avaya, Ciena, Ericsson, and Genband, while the real estate property was purchased by Public Works and Government Services Canada for CDN$208 million. The site consolidated office space for about 8,500 staff members of the National Defence Headquarters that were scattered across more than 40 different locations across the National Capital Region. The renovations to accommodate the defence personnel were projected to be approximately CDN$506 million, staged over 6 years.

In 2013, it was reported that electronic eavesdropping devices were found at the Carling Campus, and that Nortel had been the target of industrial espionage for nearly a decade before its bankruptcy. This security concern even caused DND to reconsider its move to the site, but federal officials later said they never found any bugs during a sweep.

Defence personnel began relocating to NDHQ Carling in January 2017. On April 11, 2019, DND announced that a lottery system will be used to award employees parking spots due to scarcity.

On August 1, 2023, it is reported that around $1 billion CAD will be spent to construct a new operational headquarters facility with completion by 2029. It would house the Canadian Special Operations Forces Command and the Canadian Joint Operations Command. This would eventually allow for the eventual vacating of 101 Colonel By Drive by 2035.

On January 21, 2024, a 70 caliber historic gun from HMCS Gatineau was transported to Carling and placed on display outside the NDHQ building.

On December 4, 2025, NDHQ Carling will host the Canadian Joint Forces Command.

== Features ==
Amenities on the site include parks and patios, fitness centre, sports fields, parking for 5,925 cars (including a 480 car parkade), and access to forested lands of the Ottawa Greenbelt. Due to NDHQ Carling's proximity to the greenbelt, Canada geese have nested inside the site, prompting the DND to issue an internal directive on dealing with the geese.

== Transportation ==
NDHQ Carling is located about 1 km north of Ontario Highway 417, a major east-west thoroughfare in Ottawa. It is accessible via OC Transpo routes 57, 58, and 66.

== See also ==
- Major-General George R. Pearkes Building - principal location of Canada's National Defence Headquarters
- Connaught National Army Cadet Summer Training Centre - located nearby
