= Constitution Building =

Office building in Ottawa, Ontario, Canada

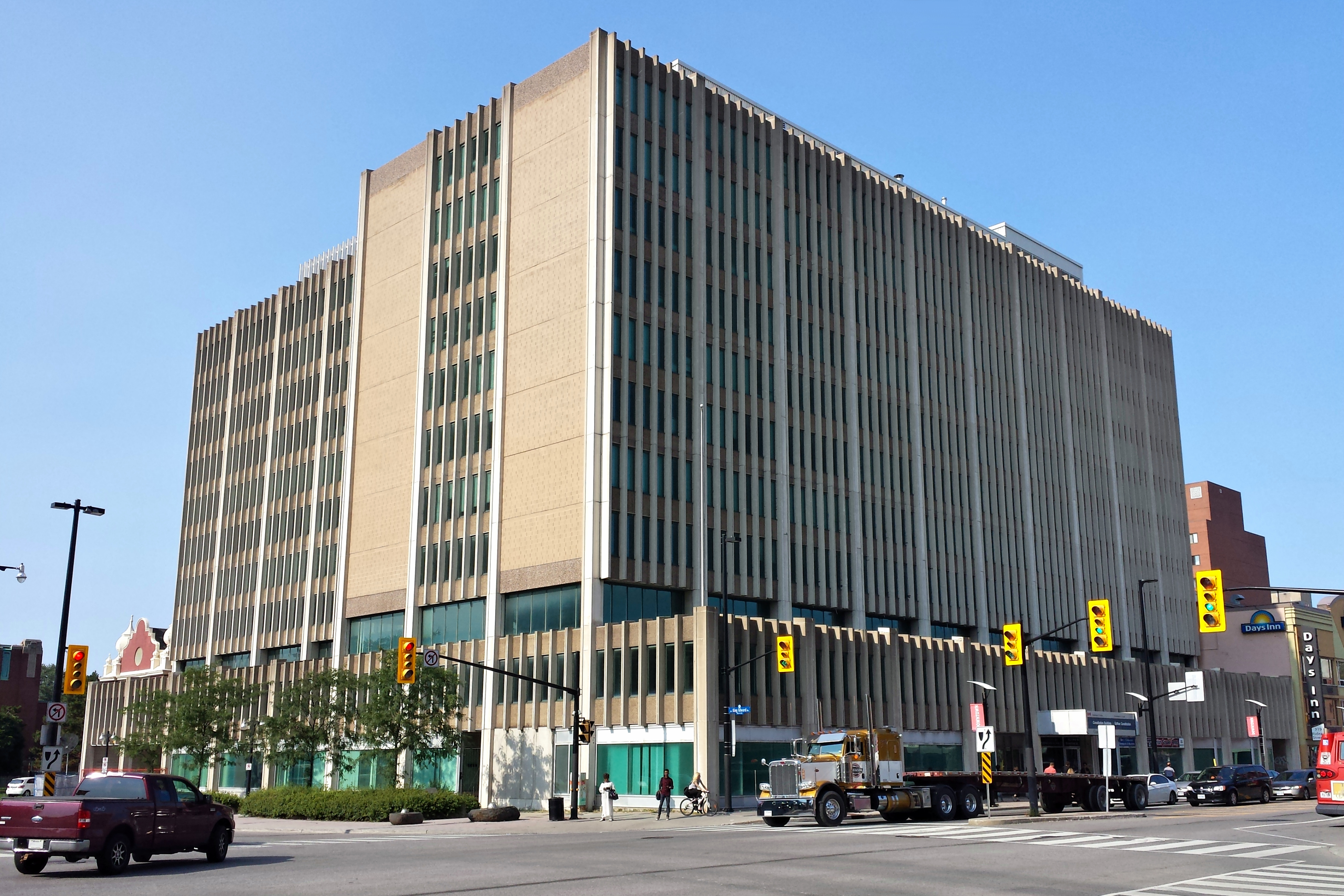
- Interactive map of the Constitution Building area

General information
- Location: 305 Rideau Street, Ottawa, Ontario, Canada
- Coordinates: 45°25′45″N 75°41′07″W

Technical details
- Floor count: 11

Design and construction
- Architect: George Bemi

The Constitution Building was an eleven-story government office building in Ottawa, Ontario, Canada. It has since been reconstructed into student apartments under the new name Théo.

Located at 305 Rideau Street at the corner of King Edward, the building was used by the Department of National Defence (DND). As of 2015, the building has been decommissioned and the DND teams previously using the building have been relocated.

While operating as a government office, amenities at the building included a cafeteria, barber shop and convenience store, all of which were accessible to the general public as well as employees of the building.

The building was constructed in 1963 by the Bourque brothers and originally named the Bourque Memorial Building, in honour of their father and former Mayor of Ottawa Eddy Bourque.

After significant renovations, the Constitution Building is, as of 2020, an all-inclusive student apartment building branded under the name Théo. The University of Ottawa is within walking distance from the building.
