= Cyprès et lauriers =

Composition written by Camille Saint-Saëns

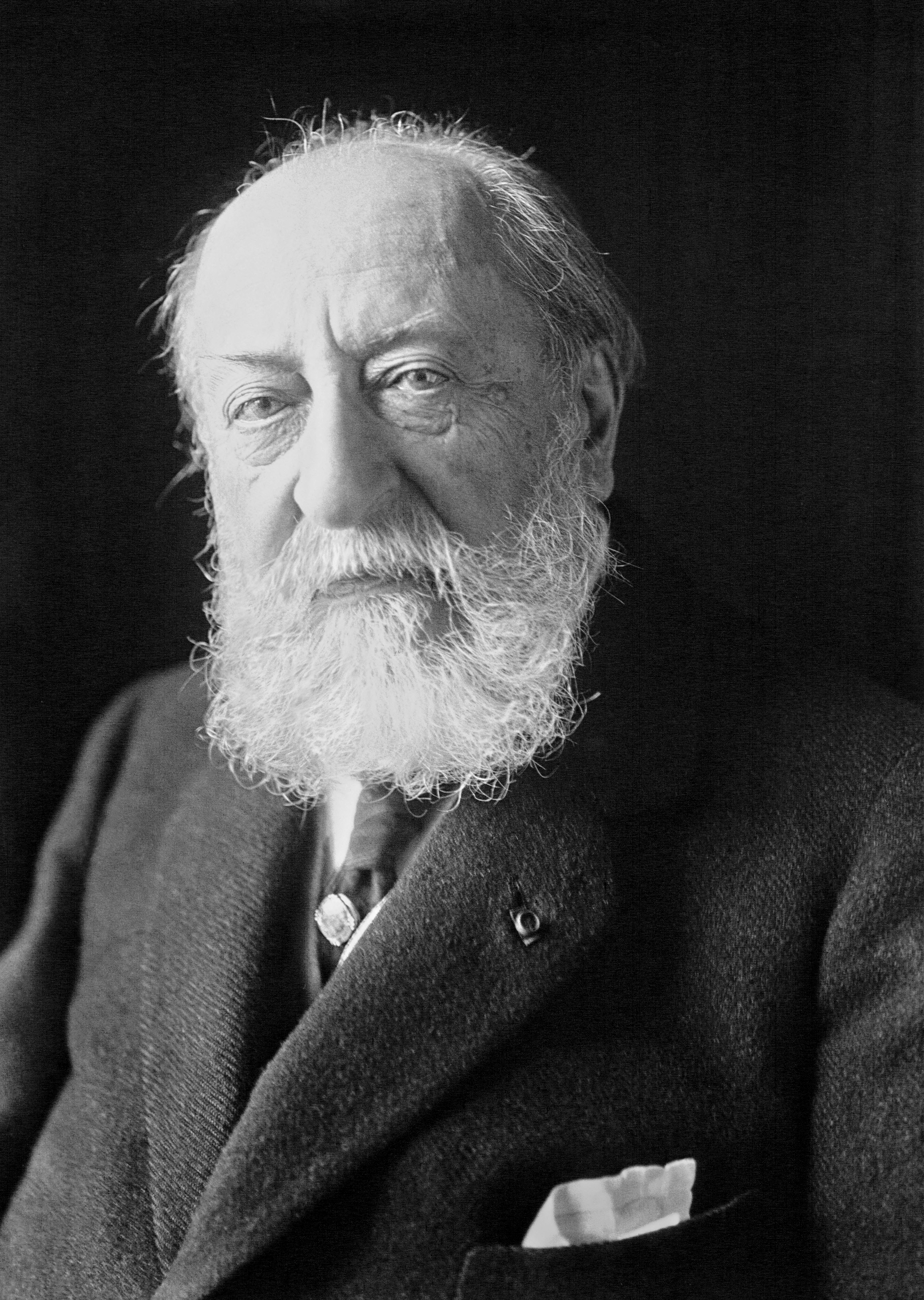
Camille Saint-Saens in 1921

Cyprès et Lauriers, Op. 156, for Organ and Orchestra was written by Camille Saint-Saëns in 1919 to celebrate the Allied victory in World War I and dedicated to then President of France, Raymond Poincaré.

== Structure ==
The composition is structured in two movements:

1. Cyprès (Poco adagio)
2. Lauriers (Allegro non troppo)

Lasting not quite 20 minutes, the piece is program music divided into two parts. The first, "cyprès" ("cypress"), is a mournful dirge adagio for organ solo, recalling a mournful cypress. Once the orchestra makes its entrance, there is an uplifting and sprightly interplay between the organ and orchestra, reminiscent of a militaristic march (hence the "lauriers", or "laurels") that makes liberal use of brass and a large percussion band (unusually including a snare drum).

== Reception ==
One of Saint-Saëns' more unusual compositions, this piece has not secured the same status as his Third Symphony, written for similar ensemble 31 years earlier. This might be because Cyprès et Lauriers is shorter and markedly less profound and sweeping nature than its predecessor. The instrumentation bears note: whereas the Third Symphony was written with the organ incorporated as a member of the orchestral ensemble, something that would bear repetition (most famously in Richard Strauss's Also sprach Zarathustra), Cyprès et Lauriers is structured in traditional concerto form with the organ as soloist.
