= Rideau Centre =

Shopping mall in Ottawa, Ontario, Canada

CF Rideau Centre
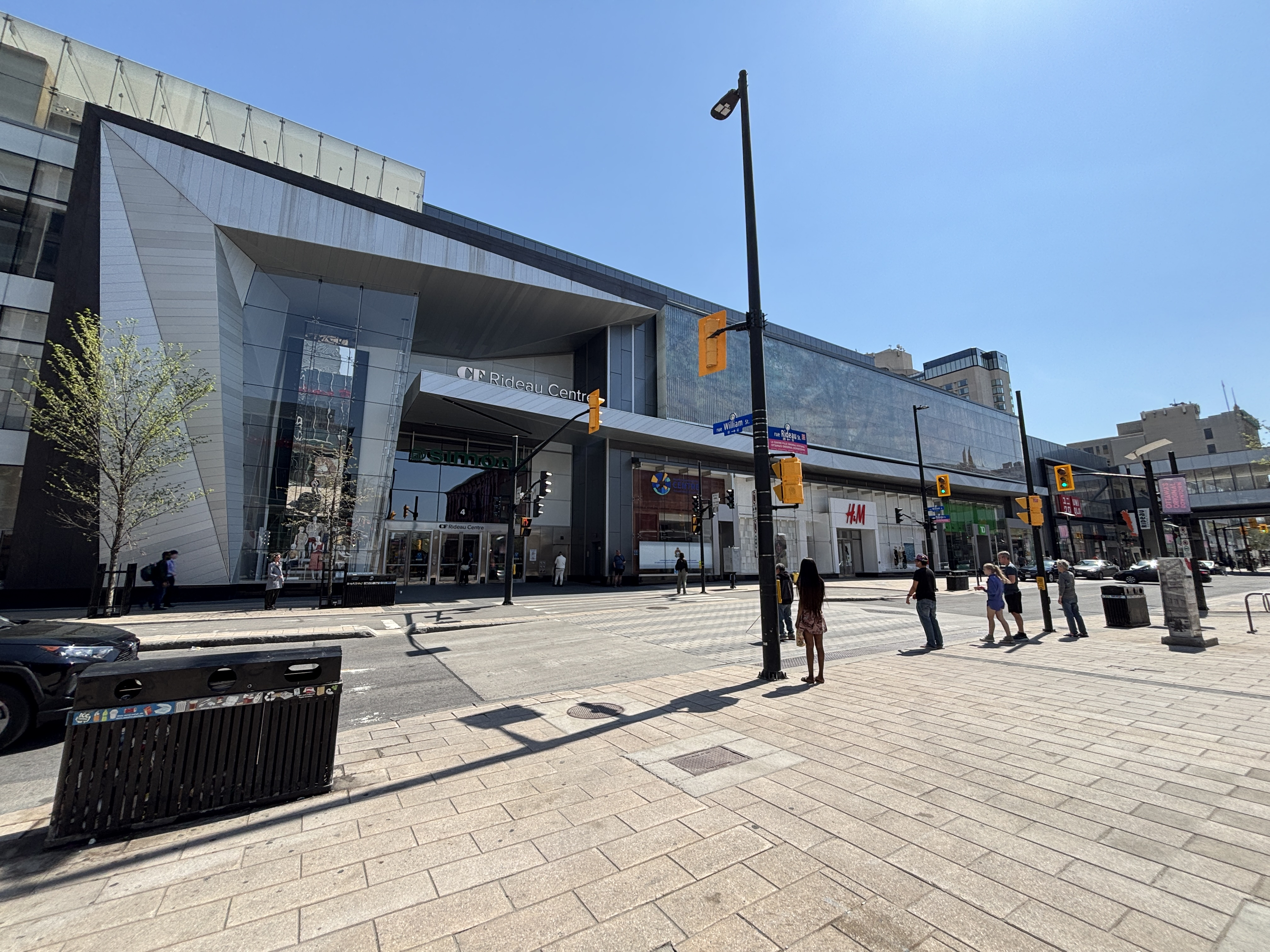
- Rideau Centre entrance, 2025
- Coordinates: 45.4243°N 75.6907°W
- Address: 50 Rideau Street; Ottawa, Ontario; K1N 9J7
- Opened: March 16, 1983
- Developer: Viking Rideau, Eaton's
- Manager: Jitesh Karamchandani
- Owner: Cadillac Fairview
- Num. of stores: 180
- Floor area: 1,545,113 sq ft (143,545.7 m^{2})
- Floors: 4
- Parking: 1,590 spaces in two indoor lots and a surface lot
- Public transit: Rideau; R1 5 6 7 11 12 14 15 16 18 19 20 N39 N45 N57 N61 N75 N97 400 services to Lansdowne Park STO services at Mackenzie King Station
- Website: shops.cadillacfairview.com/property/cf-rideau-centre

The Rideau Centre (French: Centre Rideau) (corporately styled as CF Rideau Centre) is a three-level shopping centre on Rideau Street in Ottawa, Ontario, Canada. It borders on Rideau Street, the ByWard Market, the Rideau Canal, the Mackenzie King Bridge, and Nicholas Street in Downtown Ottawa. Over 20 million people visit the mall annually. It is the largest shopping mall in the National Capital Region and the sixth largest mall, by area, in Canada. The Rideau Centre complex has approximately 180 retailers and is connected to a rooftop park, a Westin Hotel, the Rogers Centre, the Freiman Mall and the Major-General George R. Pearkes Building.

== History ==
During its construction from 1981 to 1982, the construction of the Rideau Centre is speculated to have been largely controversial and widely opposed by local residents and business owners, as a whole block of stores south of Hudson's Bay Company's "The Bay" on Rideau Street would have required demolishing, solely to make room for the new building, and vehicle traffic was most likely to increase substantially upon its completion. The Eaton's department store chain, one of the partners in the development, faced intense local opposition when it attempted to rename the mall the "Rideau Eaton Centre" while it was under construction, eventually backing down as a result of the backlash. The mall was officially opened on March 16, 1983.

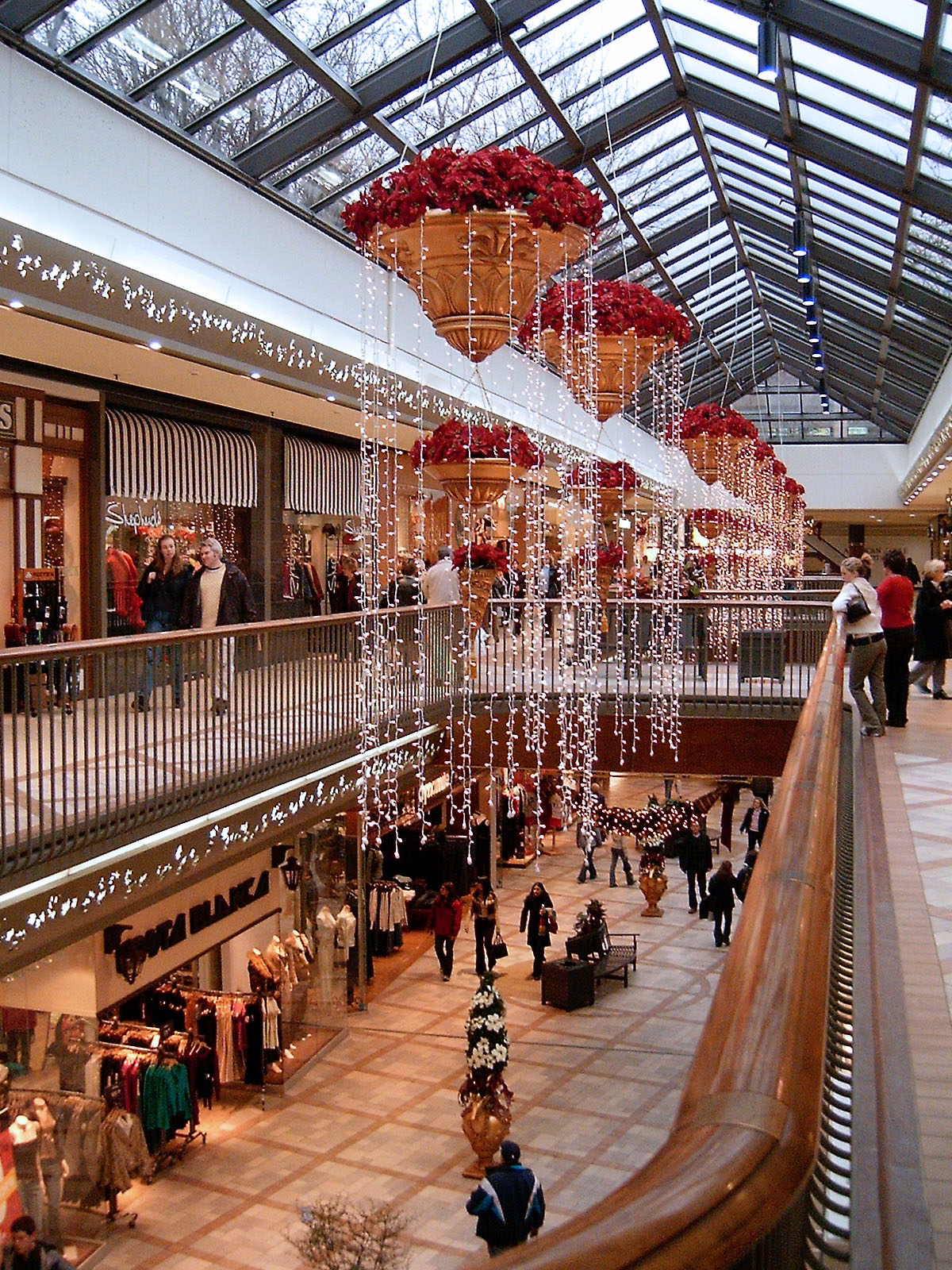
Rideau Centre at Christmas in 2004, before renovations.

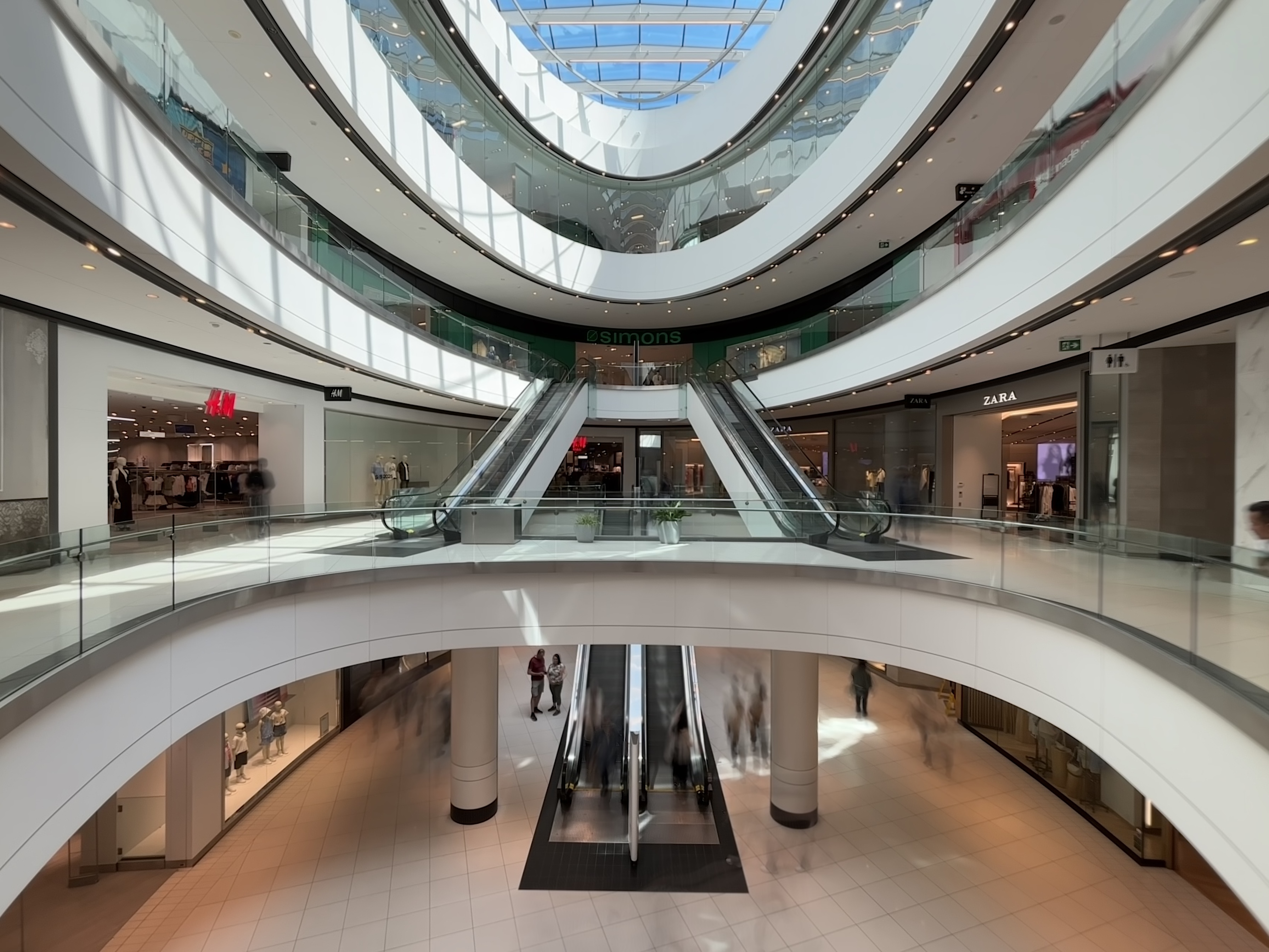
Rideau Centre expansion area

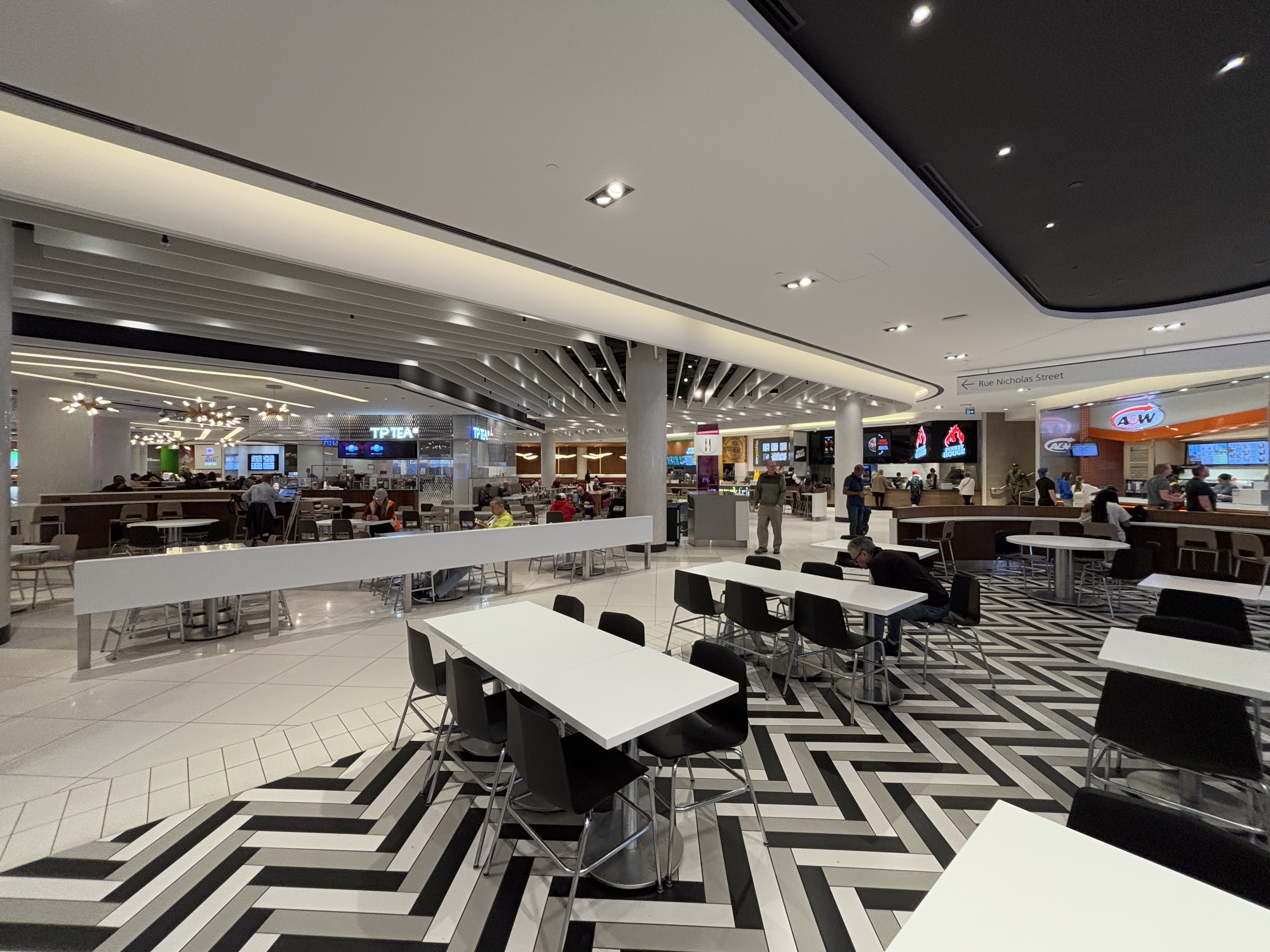
Food Court in Level 2

On September 26, 2013, Cadillac Fairview began the expansion of the 30-year-old shopping centre. The redevelopment project expanded the Rideau Centre by 230,000 square feet and renovated retail and dining spaces. A key feature of the redevelopment project was a 35,000-square-foot dining hall offering 16 eating establishments, seating for 850 people, and reusable dinnerware, glassware, and metal cutlery. The projected cost of the redevelopment project was CA$360 million.

As part of the renovation, Tiffany & Co., Kate Spade New York, and Stuart Weitzman opened locations in the mall. Large retailers added during the redevelopment included a 153,725 sq. ft. Nordstrom and a 103,874 sq. ft. Simons. Across the street, the Hudson's Bay Company announced plans for major renovations following the announcement of Nordstrom's opening; the 335,000 sq. ft. downtown flagship will be completely overhauled. This expansion has prompted many retailers already in the Rideau Centre to pursue renovations. Stores such as Harry Rosen have undergone major renovations, capitalizing on the Ottawa area's density of high income salaried government employees. While the Rideau Centre does not have plans to focus on high-end luxury, the company says that the city is more of an "aspirational luxury" marketplace, one step removed from shops such as Louis Vuitton and Prada. Aside from the retail and interior space additions and renovations, the redesigned centre included significant façade enhancements along Rideau Street including a refurbished Charles Ogilvy heritage façade. The interior renovation included new quartz flooring, enhanced lighting, glass guardrails and improved amenities. The two pedestrian bridges crossing Rideau St were taken down, with one being demolished and the other renovated. The expansion at the Rideau Centre opened to the public on August 11, 2016, bringing the total retail floor area to over 969,000 sq. ft. Nordstrom announced in March 2023 that it would close all of its Canadian stores in the summer.

== Gallery ==
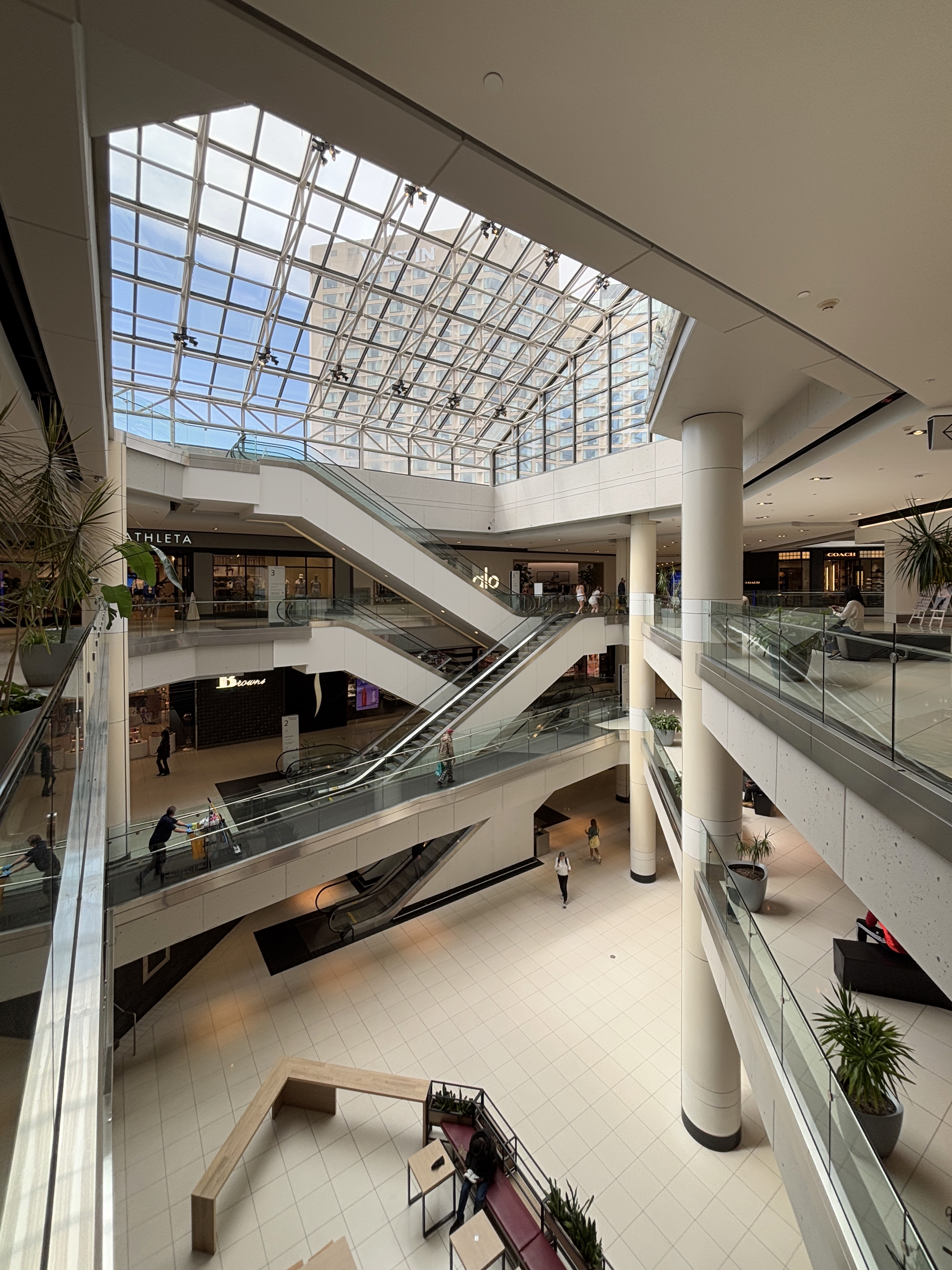
Centre Court

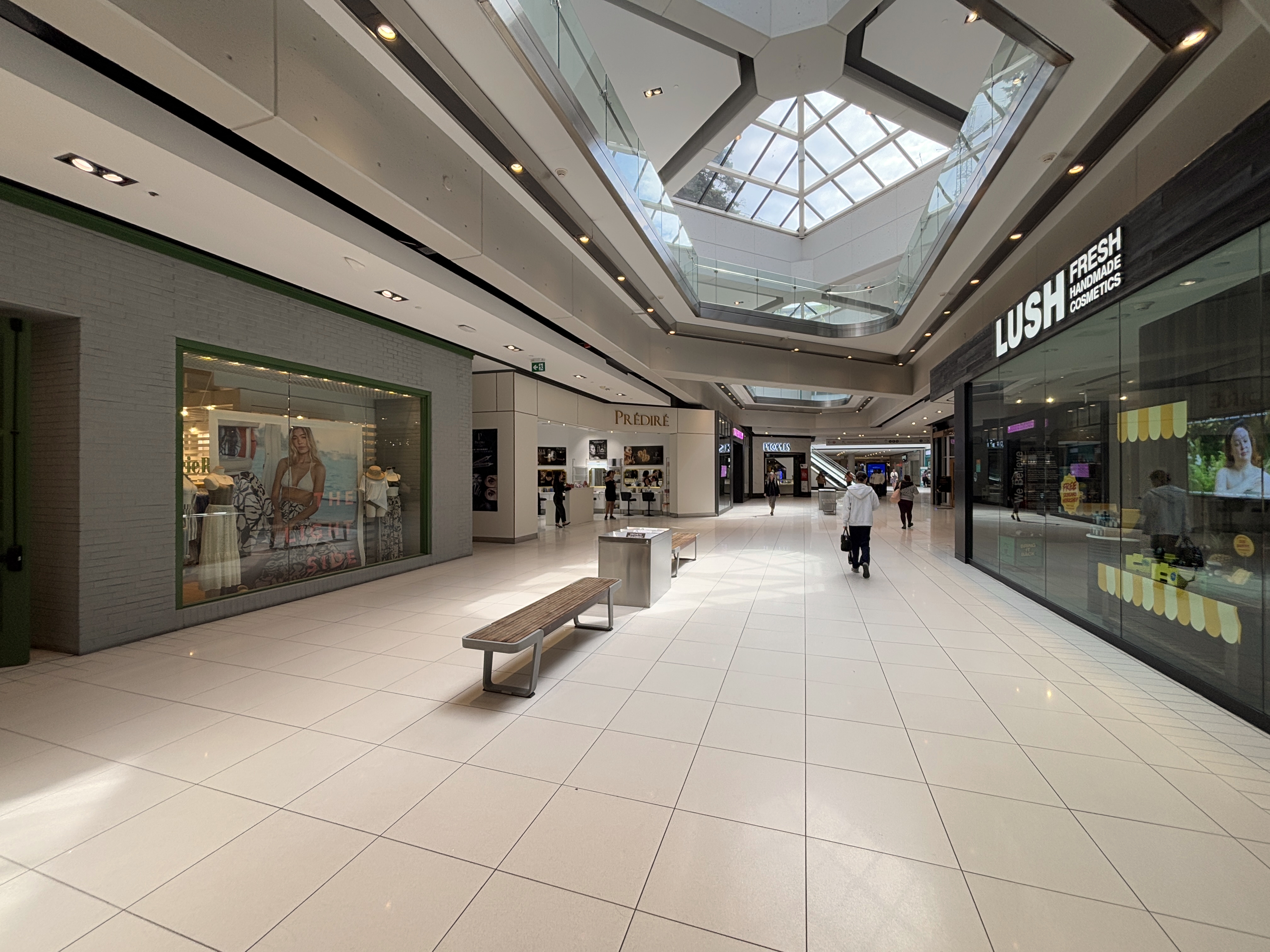
Shops in Level 2

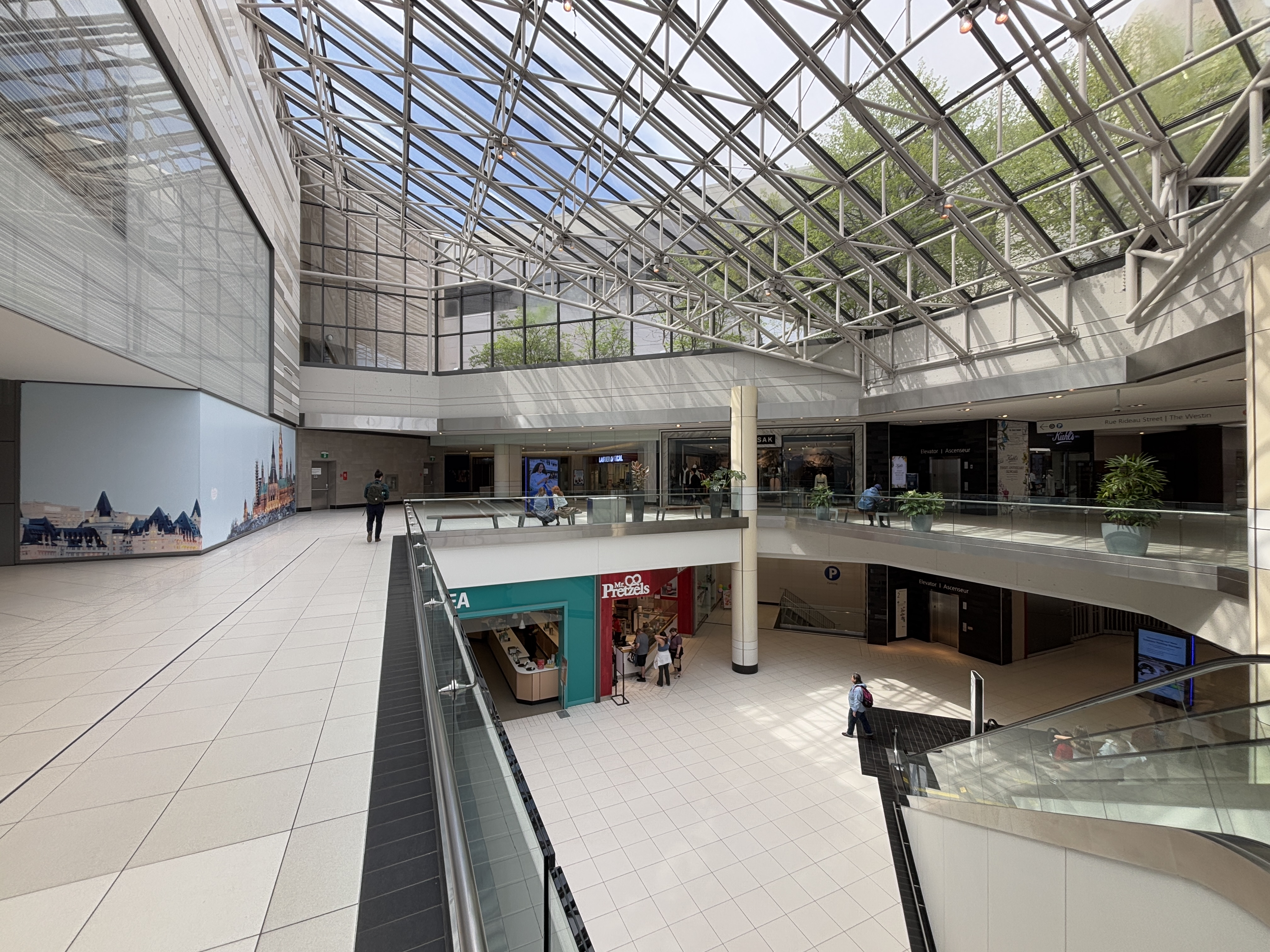
Atrium near former Nordstrom

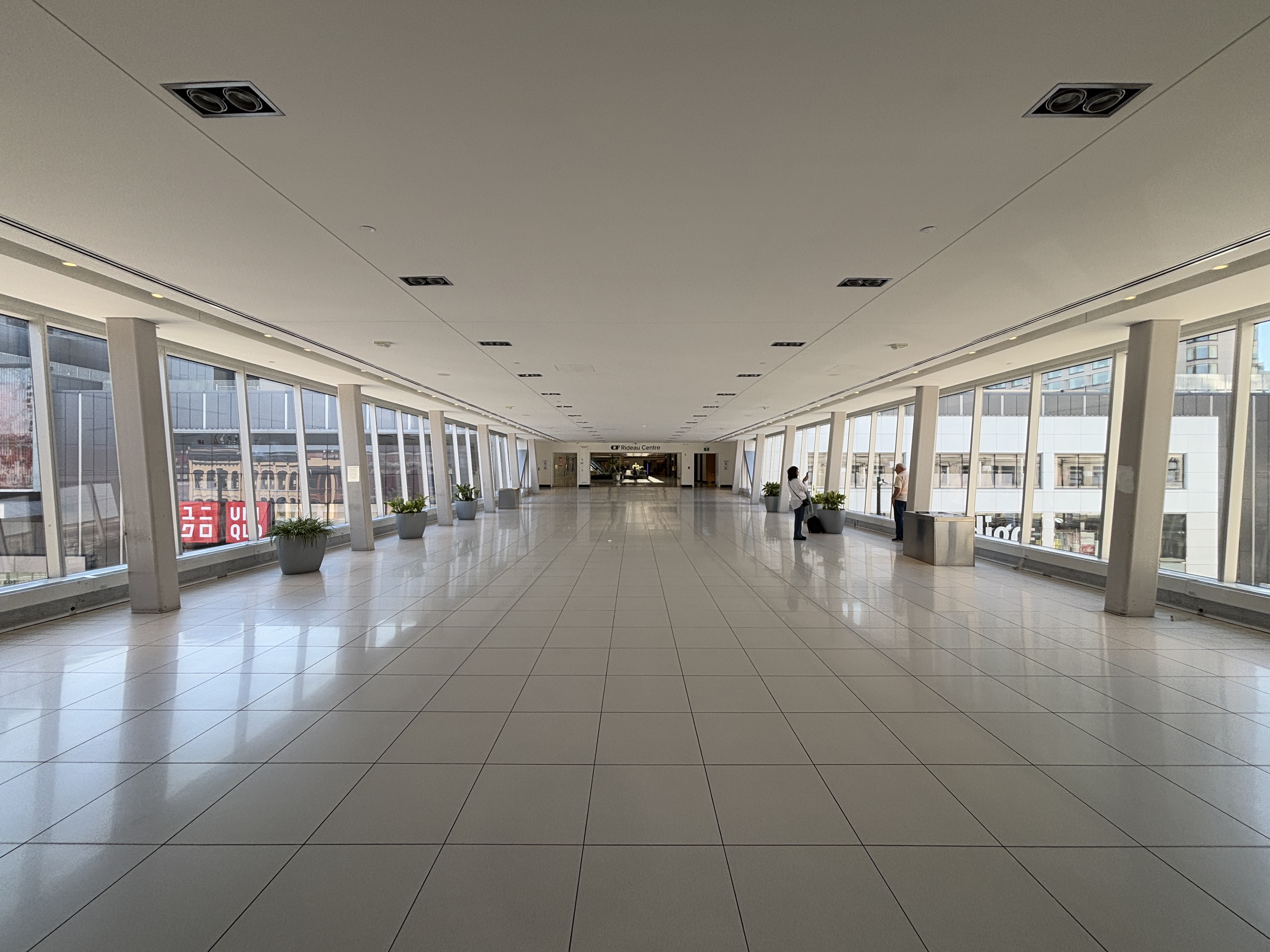
Rideau Street bridge to Rideau Centre

== Incidents ==
Rideau Centre security and maintenance staff have been the subject of a number of controversies. In 2002, security staff handcuffed and detained two men for carrying an Israeli flag to enforce a mall rule prohibiting political signs. The men claimed that abusive comments were made towards them as Jews, but a police investigation was unable to sustain the allegations of anti-semitic abuse. In 2011, security staff handcuffed and detained a man who was attempting to cancel a gym membership. The man was released when police arrived, and the Rideau Centre's tenant GoodLife Fitness suffered a media backlash over the incident. That year, nine people, including a former Speaker of the House of Commons and other dignitaries, were trapped for more than an hour and a half in the mall elevator. A former senator criticized the Rideau Centre for its slow response time.

In May 2016, a 19-year-old man was stabbed in the abdomen in the mall's rooftop garden.

On the morning of June 8, 2016, the Rideau Centre was evacuated after a sinkhole opened up on Rideau Street.

On January 29, 2022, at approximately 3 p.m., the mall closed after protesters from the convoy protest entered the mall, confronting employees following mask mandates. The mall re-opened on February 22 after police cleared the protesters out of the area. That same day, the Rideau Centre was evacuated and forced to temporarily close once again when Ottawa Police converged on the mall. A 50-year-old man was arrested and charged with robbery and "several" firearms-related offences. The incident had no connection to the Freedom Convoy, according to police. The mall re-opened on February 23.

== Transport ==
Rideau Centre is served by Rideau station on O-Train Line 1 (Confederation Line). Two of the station's four entrances are located within the mall; one near the intersection of Colonel By Drive and Rideau Street, and an accessible entrance.

Rideau Centre and the adjacent Major-General George R. Pearkes Building are served by a stop located on Mackenzie King Bridge, which was the mall's major transit hub until the opening of the Confederation Line in 2019. It is now served by OC Transpo routes 11, 16 and 19 as well as several STO routes.

== See also ==
- Eaton Centre
- List of largest enclosed shopping malls in Canada
