= Jan Laurier =

Dutch politician

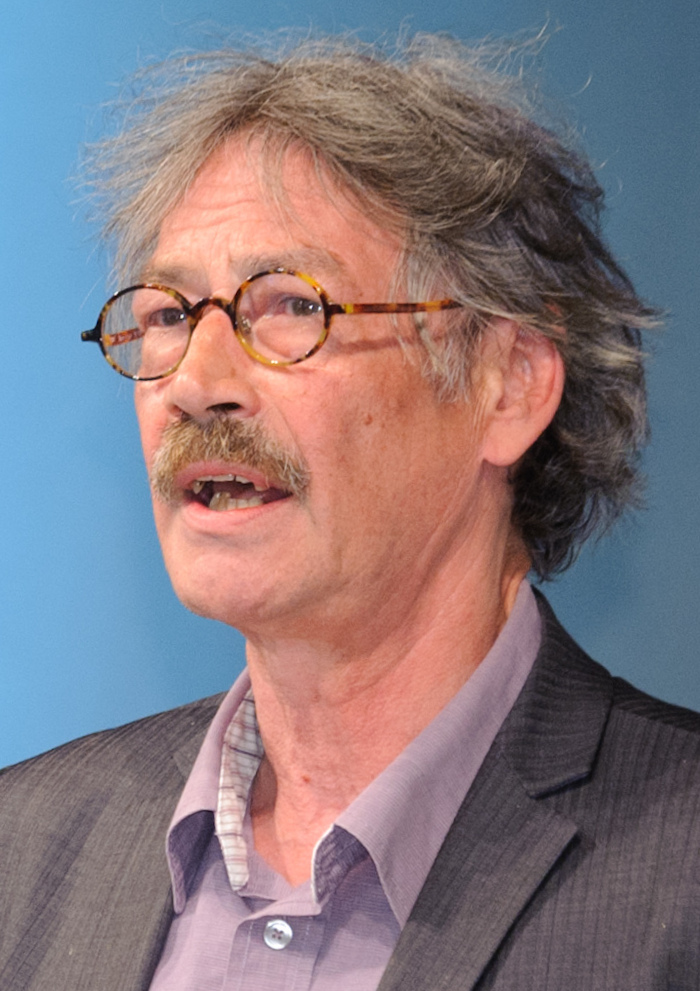

Member of the Senate
- In office 2007–2011

Personal details
- Born: Johannes Pieter Laurier; 15 October 1949 (age 76) Leiden, Netherlands
- Party: GroenLinks

Johannes Pieter (Jan) Laurier (born 15 November 1949) is a Dutch politician. From 2007 to 2011, he was a member of the Senate for GroenLinks.

Laurier studied sociology and during his studies he was active in the Leiden social movements. In 1981 he founded the left wing city paper. Between 1983 and 1993 he worked as a researcher for the research centre on Land Management and Public Housing and the Leiden Institute for Social Science.

In 1987 Laurier joined the Leiden municipal council for the Left Leiden, an alliance of the communist Communist Party of the Netherlands, the left-socialist Pacifist Socialist Party and the progressive Christian Political Party of Radicals. Laurier himself was a member of the CPN. In 1990 the three parties merged to form GroenLinks. Between 1990 and 1993 Laurier was parliamentary leader of GroenLinks in the Leiden municipal council. Between 1993 and 1998 he was alderman for social affairs, integration and employment. He also was vice-mayor. When he was vice-mayor Laurier was arrested during a clearing of a Leiden squat. He refused to give his identity, because no one had committed a crime. In order to release those who were already detained he gave out his identity as vice-mayor. He also joined a marathon occupation of the Bulderbos by members of Milieudefensie.

Between 2002 and 2003 he was member of the municipal council. When he left he was made Knight in the Order of Orange-Nassau.

In 2002 Laurier became director of the Landelijke Cliëntenraad, the national council for people receiving social security allowances. In 2003 he also became chair of the Woonbond, which represents people who rent their house. In the 2007 Senate election, Laurier was elected with preference votes by provincial councillors from South Holland.
