= Laurier Street =

Street in Gatineau, Canada

Rue Laurier
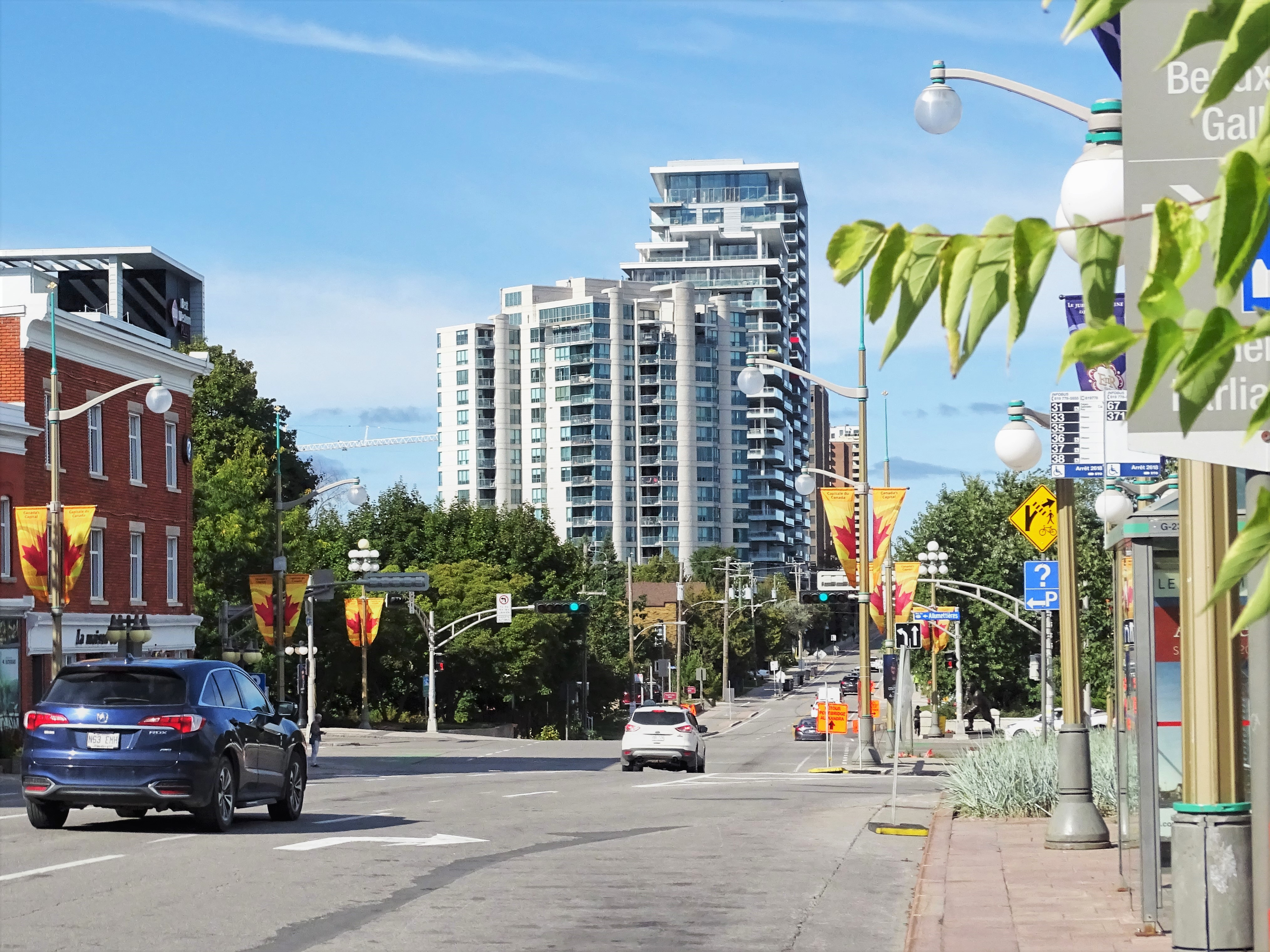
- Rue Laurier looking north towards Boulevard des Allumèttieres

Location
- Country: Canada
- Province: Quebec

Highway system
- Quebec provincial highways; Autoroutes; List; Former

Rue Laurier (Laurier Street) is a main street located in the heart of the City of Gatineau, Quebec. It starts at Rue Eddy and ends at Rue Dussault.

The street's main feature includes the Canadian Museum of Civilization, one of Gatineau's main tourist attractions. It is also the location of Gatineau City Hall connected by an overpass to the Four Points Hotel as well as the Gatineau Court House, the Holiday Inn, Best Western hotels, the Saint-Joseph private college (although a secondary school) for girls, and many office buildings of Place du Portage. The Scott tissue paper mill located in front of City Hall is an historic landmark and the city has adopted plans which will create green spaces when the mill will shut down at an unknown date. It was also the site of the Domtar mill which ceased all Gatineau and Ottawa operations in 2006–07 as part of the restructuring of the wood pulp and forest industries.

One of the region's oldest restaurants, Café Henry Burger, which had been there since 1922, shut down in 2006.

Right beside the museum, is Jacques Cartier Park which houses many important events such as Winterlude, the Canadian Tulip Festival and Canada Day festivities. The park also contains a marina and bike paths.

This street connects three of the five inter-provincial bridges heading to Ottawa: the Alexandra Bridge, the Chaudière Bridge and the Portage Bridge. It also crosses over the Macdonald-Cartier Bridge (Autoroute 5).

The street was part of Route 148 prior to the construction of the Aylmer by-pass Boulevard des Allumettières (formerly called Boulevard de l'Outaouais and Boulevard Saint-Laurent) that bypasses downtown Hull.

== See also ==
- Laurier (disambiguation)
- List of Gatineau roads
