= Deloria =

Deloria is a Native American surname, derived from the name of a French trapper, Phillippe des Lauriers, who settled and married into a Yankton community of the Dakota people. Notable people with the name include:

- Ella Cara Deloria (1888–1971), educator, anthropologist, ethnographer, linguist, and author of Waterlily;
- Mary Sully (1896–1963), born Susan Mabel Deloria, avant-garde artist;
- Philip J. Deloria (born 1959), American Indian author, historian; son of Vine Deloria Jr.;
- Philip Joseph Deloria, an Episcopal priest, aka Tipi Sapa (Black Lodge), a leader of the Yankton/Nakota band of the Sioux Nation;
- Phillip S. 'Sam' Deloria (Standing Rock Sioux Tribe), former director of the American Indian Law Center and the American Indian Graduate Center of Albuquerque, New Mexico, and brother of Vine Deloria Jr.;
- Vine Deloria Jr. (1933–2005), American Indian author, theologian, historian, and activist.
