= Mackenzie King Bridge =

Bridge in Ontario, Canada

Coordinates: 45°25′24″N 75°41′28″W

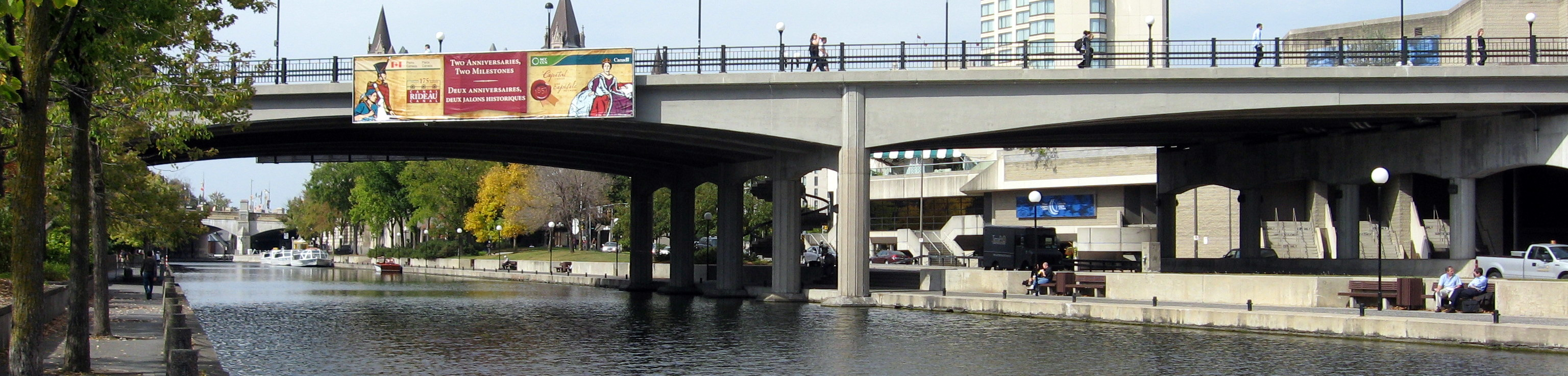

The Mackenzie King Bridge is a bridge over the Rideau Canal in Ottawa, Ontario, Canada. Just a few blocks away from Parliament Hill, south of the Plaza Bridge, it runs in a generally east–west direction, with the east end at the Rideau Centre and Department of National Defence Headquarters. The west end runs between the National Arts Centre and Confederation Park. It was named for William Lyon Mackenzie King (1874–1950), Canada's longest-serving prime minister and was opened to traffic in 1951. A major restoration effort was completed in 1996–1998.

OC Transpo uses the bridge for stops at the Mackenzie King Station.

The bridge was originally to be named after Colonel John By. At the suggestion of Solon Low, the bridge was named for King instead.
