= L'esplanade Laurier =

Office complex in Ontario, Canada

Coordinates: 45.418659°N 75.697507°W

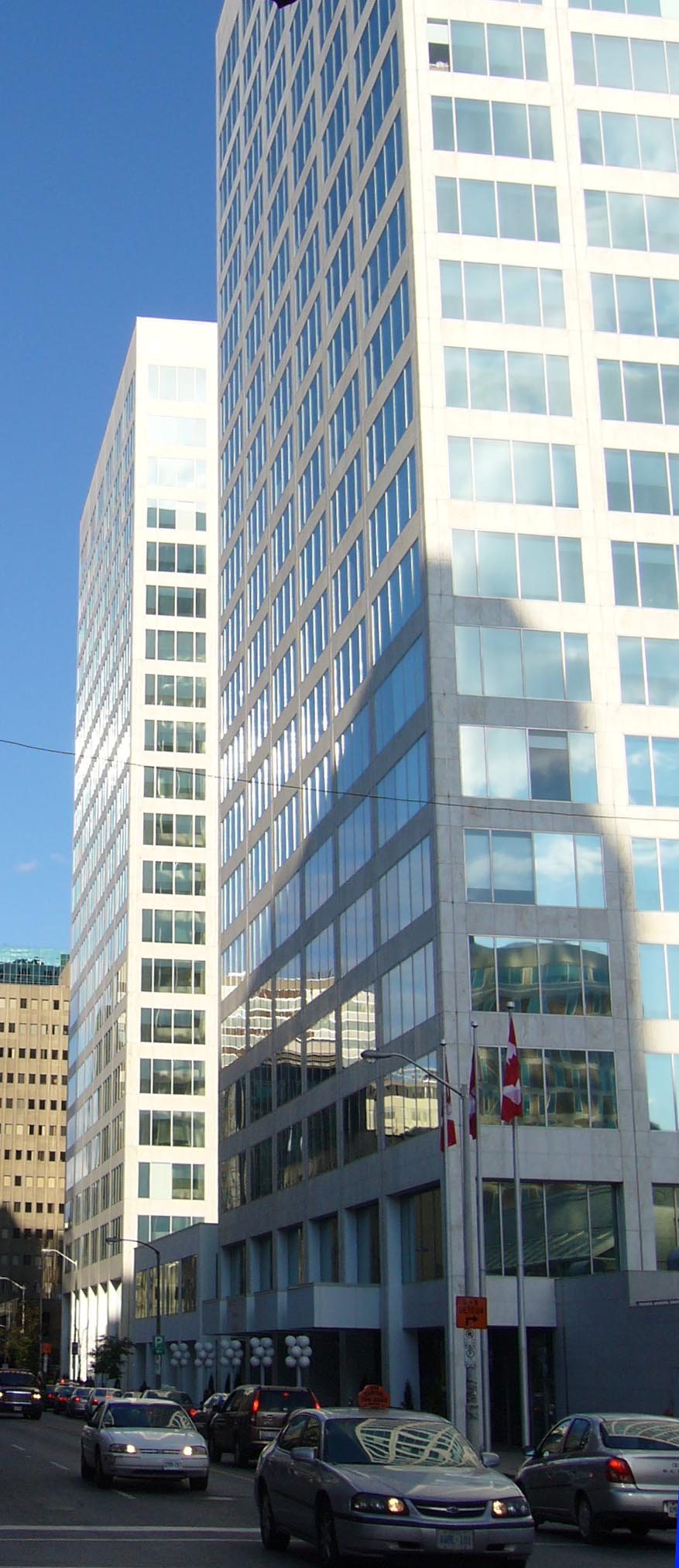
View of L'esplanade Laurier from Bank St. and Laurier Ave.

L'esplanade Laurier is an office complex in downtown Ottawa, Ontario, Canada. It consists of two 23-storey towers, a three storey underground parking garage and a podium containing a two-storey shopping mall. The entire structure is clad in white carrara marble, making it clearly stand out from the other towers in the city. It is located at the intersection of major Ottawa streets, Laurier Avenue between Bank Street and O'Connor Street. The lower two levels of the buildings stretch across the entire block and house a small shopping arcade.

== History ==
The building was built by Olympia and York in 1973-1975, and was intended to be occupied by federal government workers. It was one of the last office complexes of that era purpose-built by the private sector for the federal government, as the government itself project-managed complexes constructed in the late 1970s, including the C.D. Howe Building and Place du Portage. The building formerly housed over 2000 public servants.

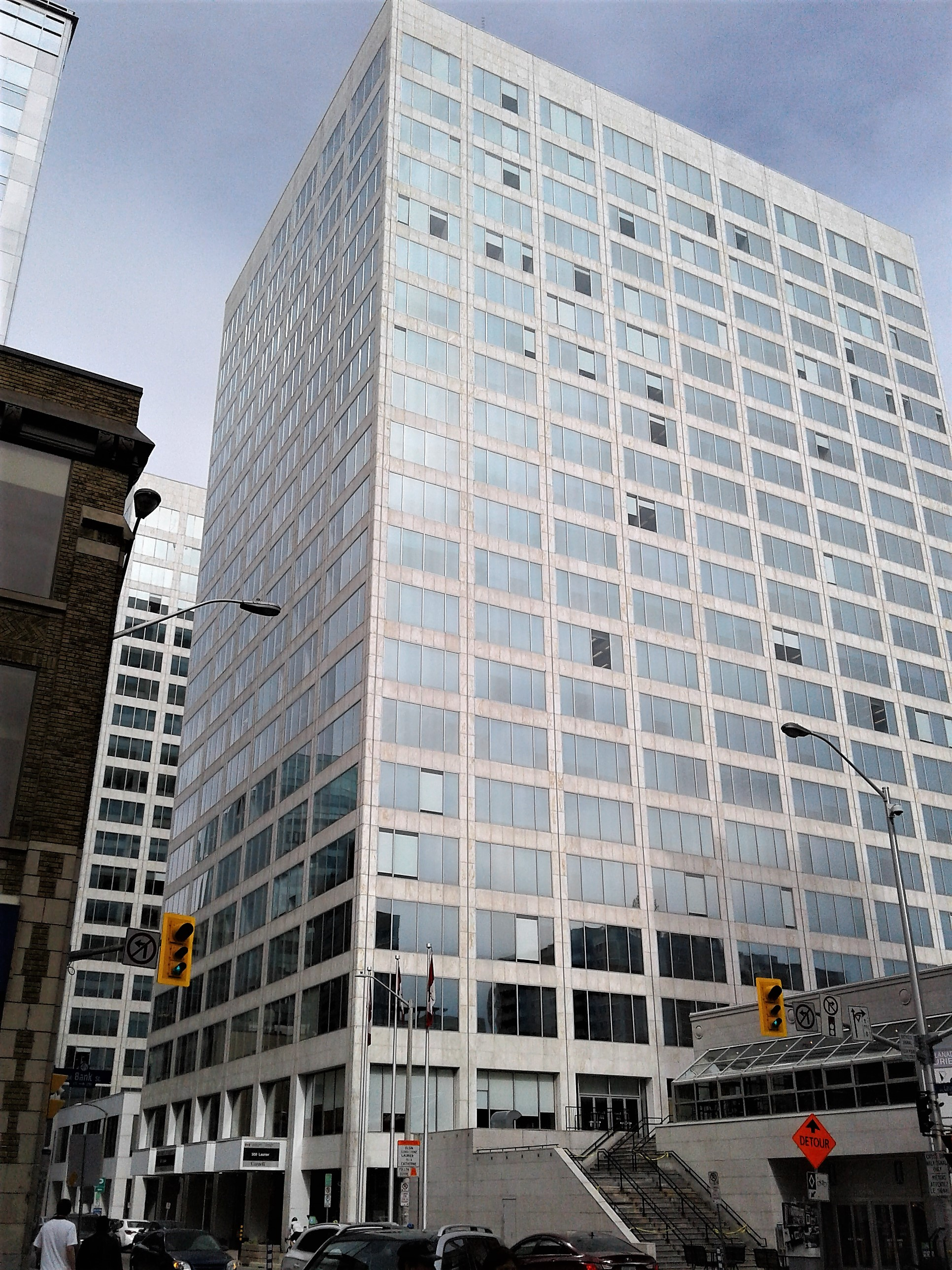
L'esplanade Laurier I

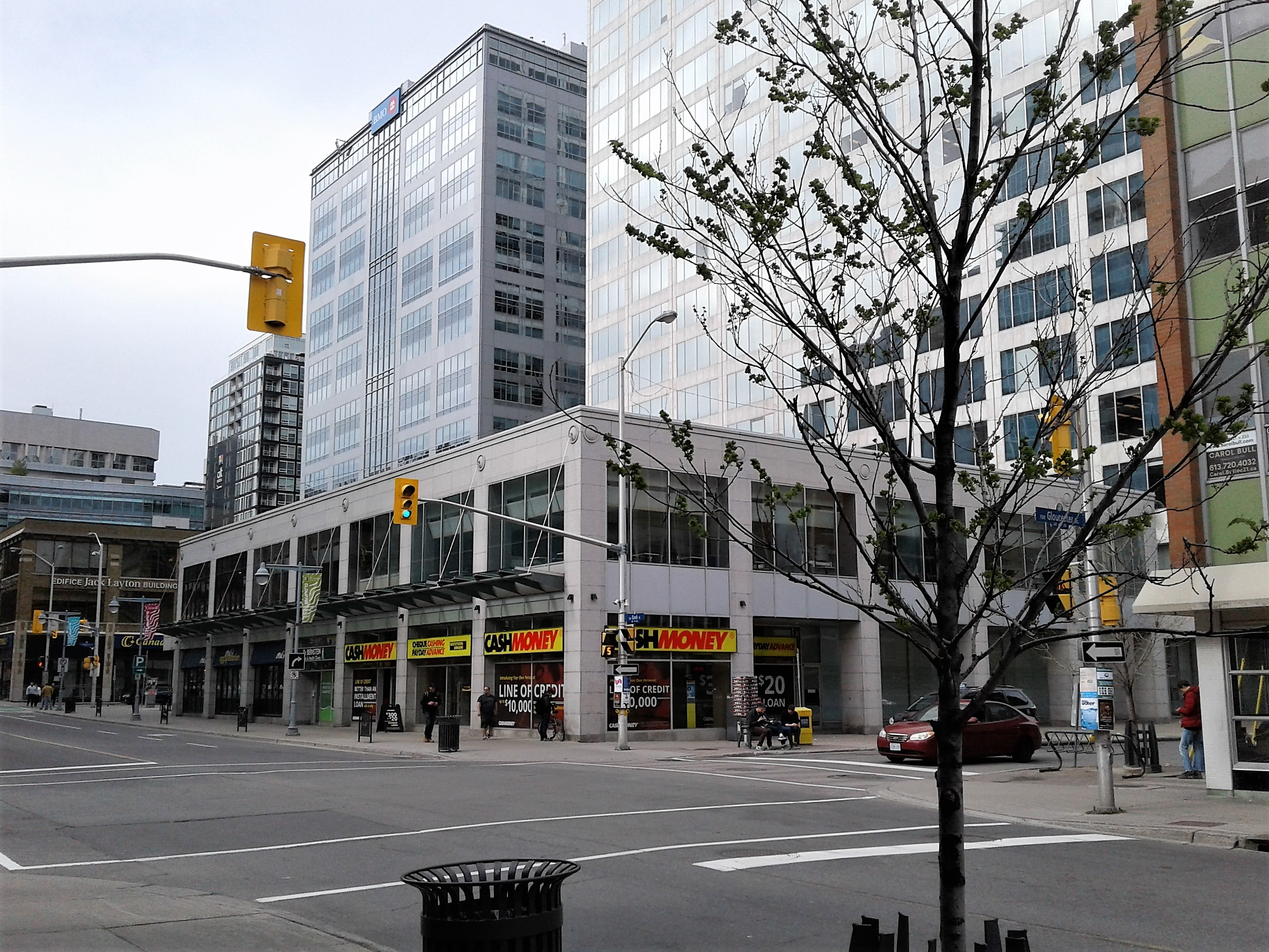
Podium

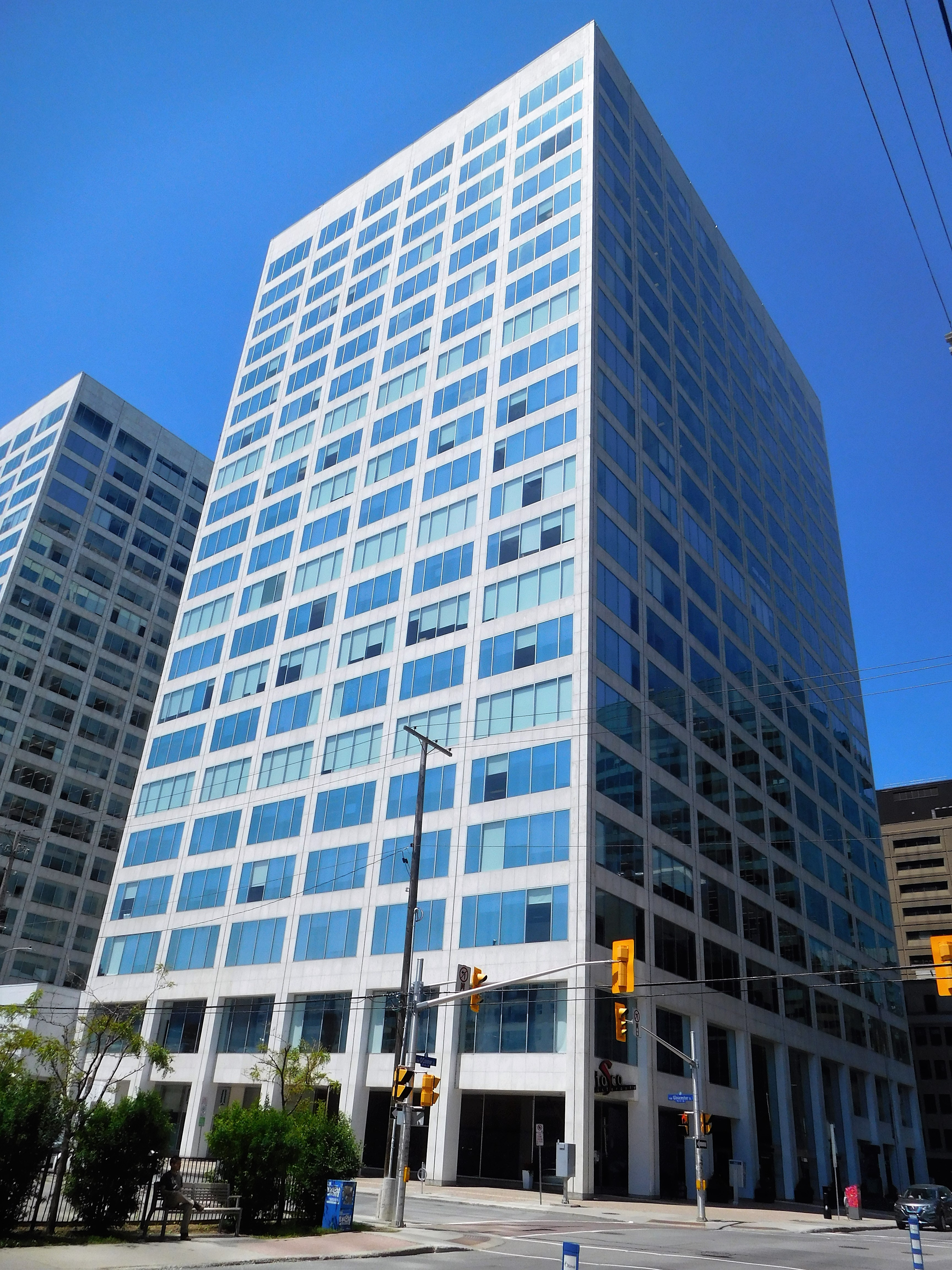
L'esplanade Laurier II

In the early 1990s, a slab of carrara marble fell from the building podium. Subsequently most of the marble slabs from the lower levels of the building were removed and replaced with white painted plasterboard. In 2002, the building was closed for several days after an accident caused hundreds of litres of ethylene glycol to enter the water supply. After the system was flushed the towers returned to operation.

The building is currently managed by Rosdev Group, an organisation that has been criticised for poor maintenance and mismanagement. As of 2018 both towers are undergoing major renovations, as most former occupants from the Department of Finance and the Treasury Board Secretariat have moved to their new location in the Flaherty Building at 90 Elgin. In 2017, a notice was posted inside the building announcing its intended closure in 2025.
