= Sir Laurier d'Arthabaska =

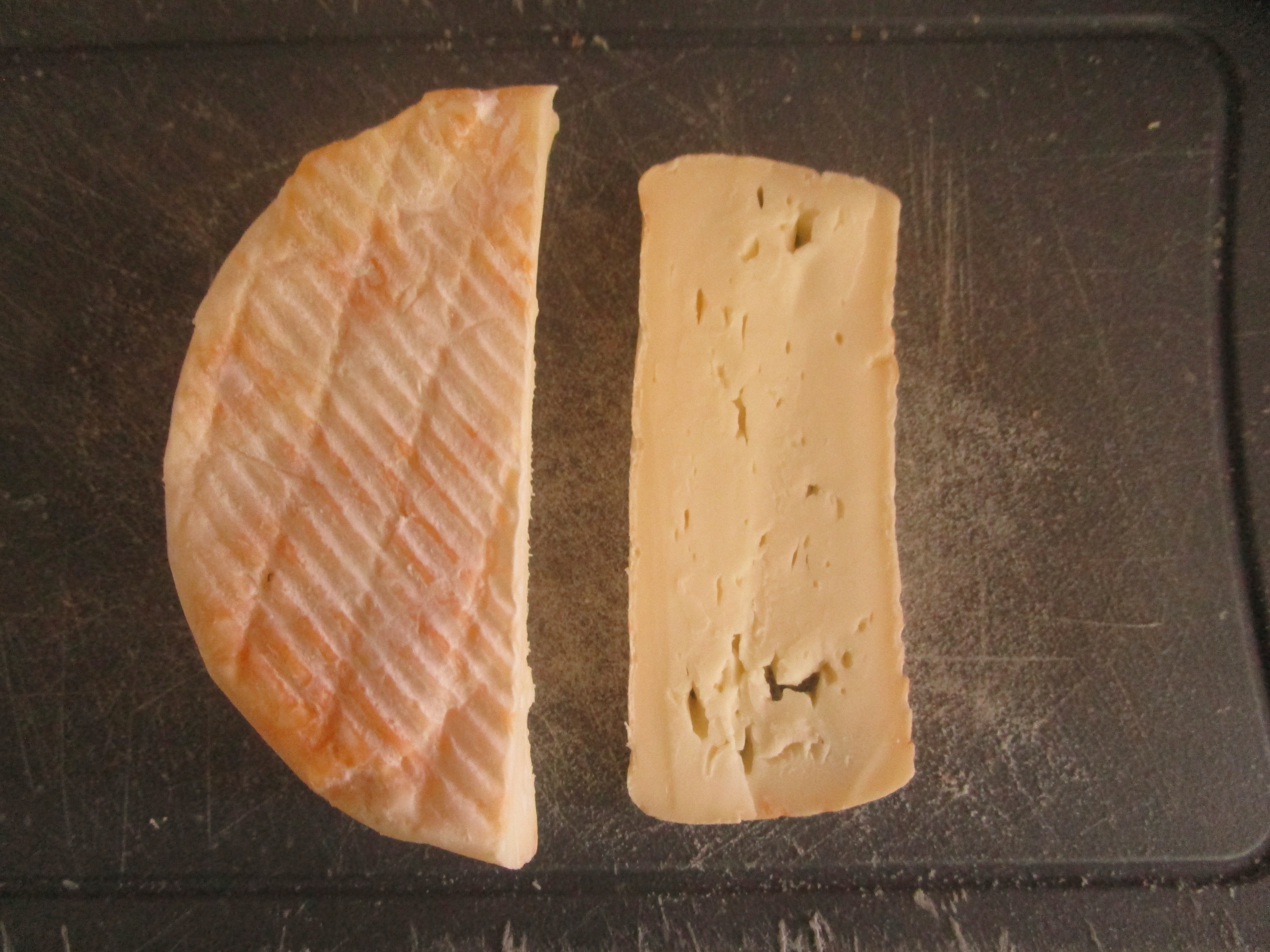

Sir Laurier d'Arthabaska is a soft cheese from Centre-du-Québec region, in Canada. It is named after the first French Canadian to become Prime Minister of the country: Sir Wilfrid Laurier.

== More information ==
- Type: soft paste, very fruity
- Manufacturer: Fromagerie Côté
- Fat content: 25%
- Humidity content: 55%

== See also ==
- List of cheeses
