= Department of National Defence (Canada) =

Canadian government department

- Ministère de la Défense nationale

Department overview
- Formed: 1923
- Preceding agencies: Department of Militia and Defence; Department of Naval Services; Air Board
- Jurisdiction: Government of Canada
- Headquarters: Major-General George R. Pearkes Building, Ottawa, Ontario; 45.423339°N 75.68924°W
- Employees: 24,000
- Annual budget: CA$30.58 billion (2024–2025)
- Minister responsible: David McGuinty, Minister of National Defence
- Deputy Minister responsible: Christiane Fox
- Child agencies: Canadian Cadet Organizations; Communications Security Establishment; Canadian Forces Military Police; Defence Research and Development Canada; Canadian Forces Housing Agency; Canadian Coast Guard
- Key document: National Defence Act
- Website: canada.ca/en/department-national-defence

The Department of National Defence (DND; French: Ministère de la Défense nationale) is the department of the Government of Canada which supports the Canadian Armed Forces in its role of defending Canadian national interests domestically and internationally. The department is a civilian organization, part of the public service, and supports the armed forces; however, as a civilian organization is separate and not part of the military itself. National Defence is the largest department of the Government of Canada in terms of budget, and it is the department with the largest number of buildings, with 6,806 as of 2015.

The department is responsible to Parliament through the minister of national defence. The deputy minister of National Defence, the senior most civil servant within the department, is responsible for the day-to-day leadership and operations of the department and reports directly to the minister. The department exists to aid the minister in carrying out their responsibilities within the Defence Portfolio and provides a civilian support system for the Canadian Armed Forces. Under the National Defence Act, the Canadian Armed Forces is a completely separate and distinct organization from, and is not part of, the Department of National Defence.

== History ==
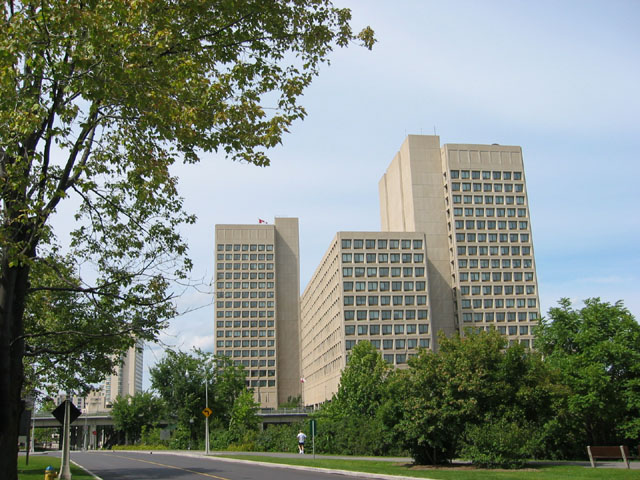
Previous National Defence Headquarters in Ottawa, Ontario, Canada

The Department of National Defence was established by the National Defence Act, which merged the Department of Militia and Defence (which was created in 1906 when the British Army withdrew its forces stationed in Canada), the Department of Naval Services (the department responsible for the administration of the Royal Canadian Navy), and the Air Board (which oversaw aviation in Canada). The National Defence Act was passed by the Parliament of Canada on June 28, 1922.

== Structure ==
Both the Canadian Armed Forces (military) and the Department of National Defence (civilian public servants) are, although two separate organizations, known collectively as the 'Defence Team' as both institutions work closely together in the defence of Canada. The minister of national defence, as the Cabinet minister responsible to Parliament for National Defence, heads the Defence Team.

=== Deputy Minister ===
The Department of National Defence is led by the Deputy Minister of National Defence. The Deputy Minister is chosen by the cabinet through the recommendation of the Prime Minister at that time. The Deputy Minister will stay in their position regardless of whether the cabinet or Prime Minister has changed.

==== Deputy Minister's Office ====
The Deputy Minister has a varying amount of Assistant Deputy Ministers (referred to as ADMs), Chiefs, and Associates that oversee various tasks within the department ranging from Material Acquisition to Information Management to Public Affairs. There are 3 other offices that operate under the Deputy Minister: the DND/CF Legal Advisors, the National Security and Intelligence Review and Oversight Coordination Secretariat, and the Chief of Defence intelligence.

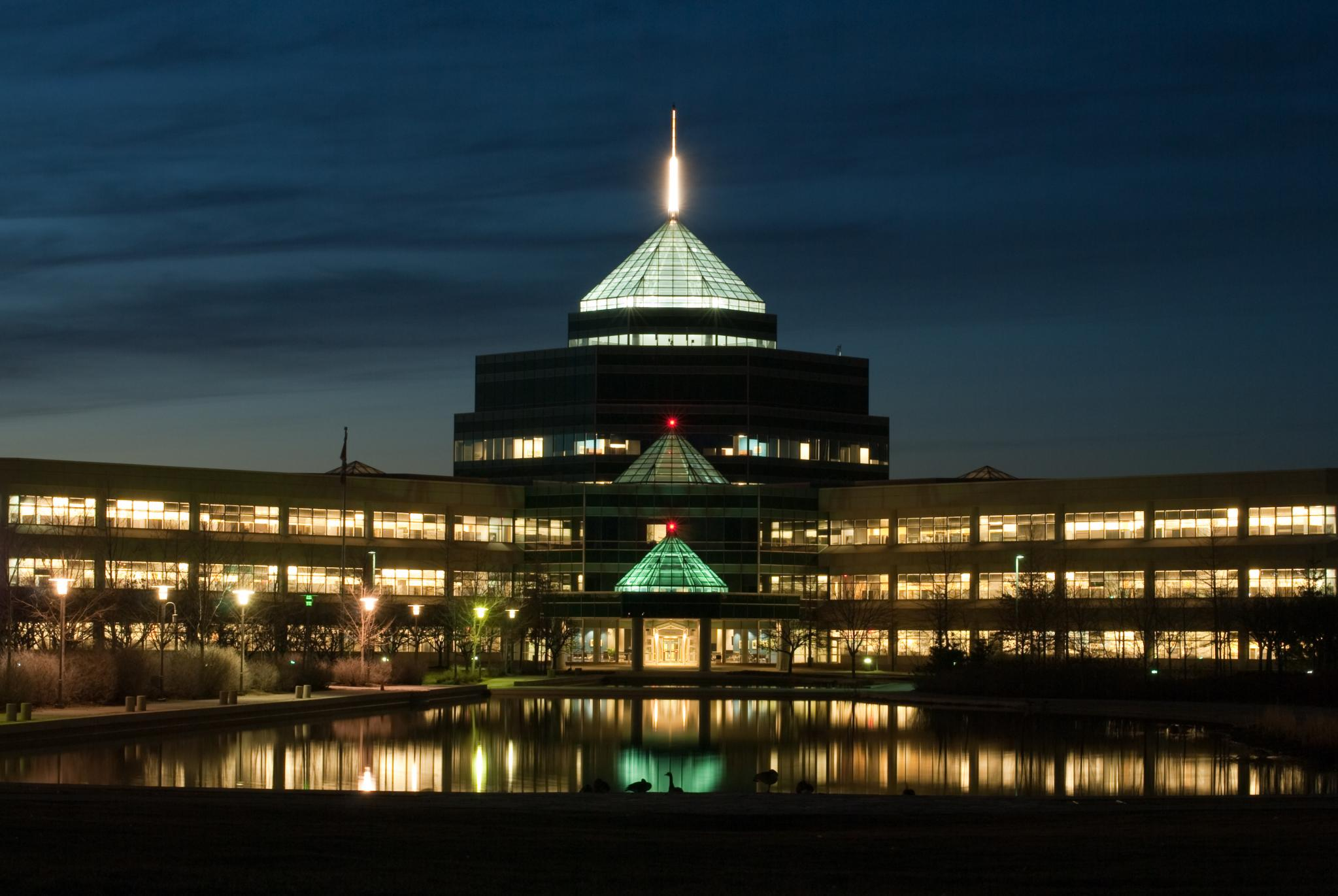
NDHQ Carling in Ottawa, Ontario, Canada

- The associate Deputy Minister has no set role description. They are to take over the files and tasks the Deputy Minister gives them. The ADM reports directly to the Deputy Minister.
- The Assistant Deputy Minister (Public affairs), referred to as ADM(PA), oversee communications related tasks such as advice and guidance in relation to Canada's defences. The ADM(PA) reports directly to the Deputy Minister.
- The Assistant Deputy Minister (Defence Research and Development Canada), referred to as ADM(DRDC), oversees the department's scientific and technological advancements and provides sound technological advice on Canada's defence systems. The ADM(DRDC) reports directly to the Deputy Minister.
- The Assistant Deputy Minister (Information Management) recently changed their name to Chief Information Officer, referred to as CIO. The CIO group oversees the management of key information and intelligence for Canada's defence and cyber operations for DND and CAF. The CIO reports directly to the Deputy Minister.
- The Assistant Deputy Minister (Review Services), referred to as ADM(RS), oversees changes and reviews requested policies and promote improvements to Canadian operations at home and abroad. The ADM(RS) reports directly to the Deputy Minister.
- The Assistant Deputy Minister (Data, Innovation, and Analytics), referred to as ADM(DIA), oversees data decision taken by the department as well as overseeing its integration into the department and analytics. The ADM(DIA) reports directly to the Deputy Minister.
- The Assistant Deputy Minister (Policy), referred to as ADM(Pol), oversees defence policy proceedings, developments, and support for the department and the Canadian Armed Forces. The ADM(Pol) reports directly to the Deputy Minister.
- The Assistant Deputy Minister (Finance), referred to as ADM(Fin) or Chief Financial Officer, oversees all financial dealings within the department including but not limited to financial management, budget approvals, financial reallocation, and financial support. The ADM(Fin) reports directly to the Deputy Minister.
- The Assistant Deputy Minister (Materiel), referred to as ADM(Mat), oversees all Materiel acquisitions and service that are needed by the department or Canadian Armed Forces. The ADM(Mat) reports directly to the Deputy Minister.
- The Assistant Deputy Minister (Infrastructure & Environment), referred to as ADM(IE), oversees real estates acquisitions and needs for the Canadian Armed Forces as well as property management, infrastructure and environmental needs related to the department. The ADM(IE) reports directly to the Deputy Minister.
- The Assistant Deputy Minister (Human Resources - Civilian), referred to as ADM(HR-Civ), oversees all the human resources needs of the Defence Teams civilian members which includes but is not limited to recruitment, retention strategies, employment offers, and staffing policies. The ADM(HR-Civ) reports directly to the Deputy Minister.

The Canadian Armed Forces is a separate and distinct military organization which works closely with, but is not a part of, the civilian department. The military comprises a variety of commands including the Royal Canadian Navy, Canadian Army and Royal Canadian Air Force, and is led by the chief of the defence staff, who is under the direction of the minister of national defence. There are also a variety of offices and support organizations which report to both the chief of defence staff and the deputy minister.

The legal military chain of command within the Canadian Forces originates from the king, represented by the governor general, who is commander-in-chief. The appointment of the minister, deputy minister, chief of the defence staff and the granting of all commissions in the Canadian Forces are made on behalf of The King.

== Defence Portfolio ==
One of the roles of the Department of National Defence is to support the minister of national defence in the administration of the 'Defence Portfolio', which comprises the Canadian Armed Forces, the Communications Security Establishment, Defence Research and Development Canada, and the Department of National Defence. These organizations are responsible to the minister. The department is not responsible for all of these organizations itself but rather exists to support the minister in carrying out the minister's duties within the Defence Portfolio.

The associate minister of national defence, who is also a member of the Cabinet, also exists and takes on files as assigned by the minister of national defence. After forming government in 2015, Prime Minister Justin Trudeau assigned the post of associate minister as an additional role of the minister of veterans affairs, who heads Veterans Affairs Canada, another department outside the Defence Portfolio. This continued under Prime Minister Mark Carney in 2025.

== See also ==
- Armed Forces Council
- Military history of Canada
- Union of National Defence Employees
