= Laurier Railway Bridge =

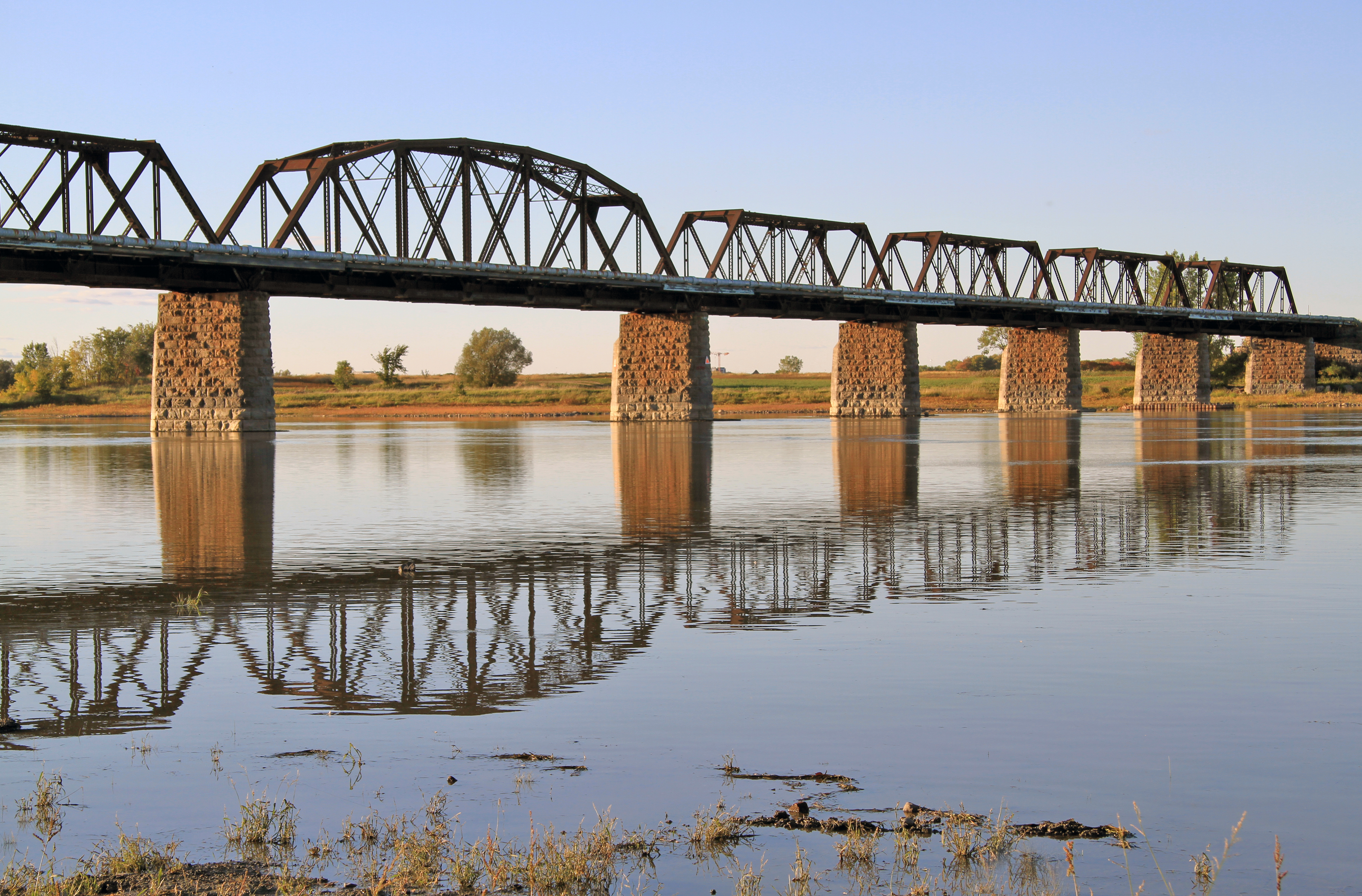
- Coordinates: 45°42′10″N 73°29′8″W
- Carries: Canadian National Railway Via Rail
- Crosses: Rivière des Prairies
- Locale: Montreal (Rivière-des-Prairies–Pointe-aux-Trembles)
- Official name: Laurier Bridge
- Other name: Pierre Le Gardeur Railway Bridge
- Maintained by: Canadian National Railway

Characteristics
- Design: Truss bridge
- Clearance below: (?)

Rail characteristics
- No. of tracks: 2
- Track gauge: 1,435 mm (4 ft 8 1/2 in) standard gauge
- Structure gauge: AAR
- Electrified: No

History
- Opened: 1904

Location
- Interactive map of Laurier Railway Bridge

The Laurier Railway Bridge (often referred to as Pierre Le Gardeur railway bridge, after the road bridge next to it) carries the Canadian National Railway from Montreal (Rivière-des-Prairies–Pointe-aux-Trembles) to Charlemagne (North Shore) via Île Bourdon.

== See also ==
- List of bridges in Canada
- List of bridges spanning the Rivière des Prairies
- List of crossings of the Rivière des Prairies
- List of bridges in Montreal
