= National Defence Headquarters (Canada) =

Military offices in Ottawa, Ontario

Coordinates: 45.4233°N 75.6892°W

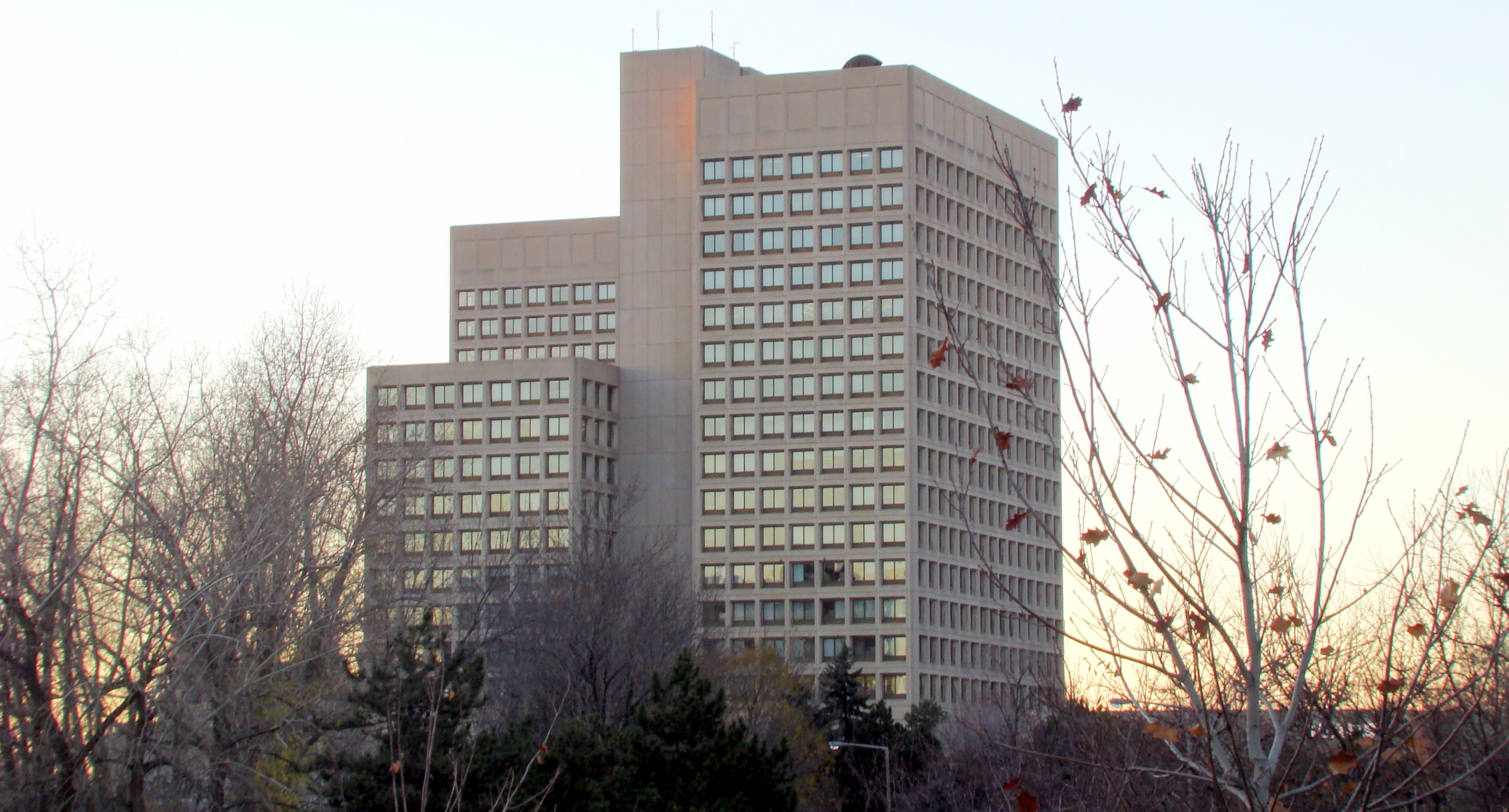
The Major-General George R. Pearkes Building

National Defence Headquarters (NDHQ; French: Quartiers généraux de la Défense nationale, QGDN) are offices created through the integration of the Canadian Armed Forces Headquarters (CAF HQ) with the civilian Department of National Defence (DND) staff in October 1972. NDHQ is not a specific location, but is instead housed throughout a collection of offices in buildings across the National Capital Region, although it is most commonly identified with the Major-General George R. Pearkes Building on Colonel By Drive in Ottawa.

From 2017, various locations have been consolidating at National Defence Headquarters, Carling Campus on Carling Avenue.

== History ==
During the Cold War, the threat of nuclear attack on the National Capital Region saw an Emergency Government Headquarters constructed 30 km west of Ottawa at CFS Carp; this facility was to house a scaled-down NDHQ, along with the federal cabinet and other political, military and government leaders.

Completed in 1974, the George R Pearkes Building was originally built for Transport Canada, until a plan for a new NDHQ in LeBreton Flats was cancelled. Transport Canada instead moved to the newly completed Place de Ville Tower C (1972). Carling Campus was originally Nortel's research and development site, until it was purchased by the Federal Government in 2010.

== Structure ==
Falling under the Minister of National Defence, NDHQ includes the office of the Chief of the Defence Staff (CDS), who is the senior military commander within the Canadian Armed Forces; and the Deputy Minister, who is the senior civil servant in charge of the Department of National Defence. Also reporting directly to the Minister are the Associate Minister of National Defence, the Judge Advocate General, and several other organizations which are considered part of the Defence Portfolio.

- Reporting to the CDS are the headquarters of all Canadian Armed Forces commands:
  - Royal Canadian Navy
  - Canadian Army
  - Royal Canadian Air Force
  - Military Personnel Command
  - Canadian Special Operations Forces Command
  - Canadian Joint Operations Command
  - Canadian Forces Intelligence Command
  - Strategic Joint Staff
  - North American Aerospace Defense Command (NORAD)
- Reporting to the DM are an Associate Deputy Minister and several Assistant Deputy Ministers (ADM):
  - Associate Deputy Minister
  - ADM (Policy)
  - ADM (Finance)
  - ADM (Materiel)
  - ADM (Infrastructure & Environment)
  - ADM (Human Resources - Civilian)
- Reporting to both the DM and the CDS are the following offices:
  - Vice Chief of the Defence Staff
  - ADM (Public Affairs)
  - ADM (Defence Research and Development Canada)
  - ADM (Information Management)
  - ADM (Review Services)
  - ADM (Data, Innovation and Analytics)
