= Laurier Avenue =

Street running through Ottawa, Ontario, Canada

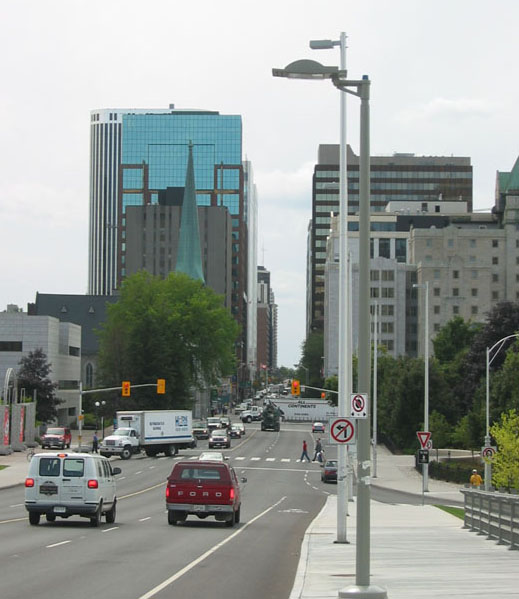
Laurier Avenue, facing west, as seen from the bridge

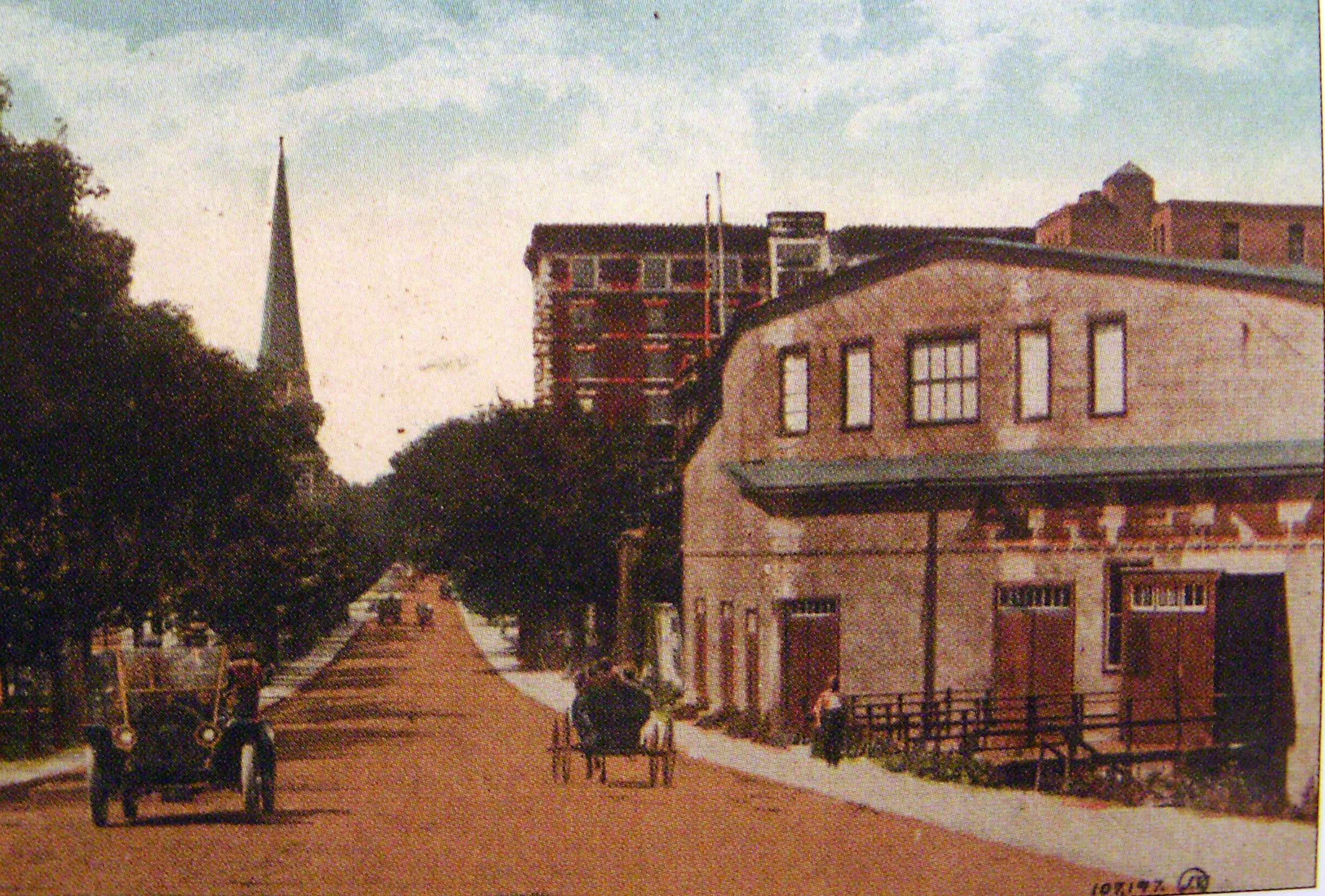
A similar view of Laurier Avenue in 1910. The Arena is on the right.

Laurier Avenue (French: Avenue Laurier; Ottawa Road No. 48) is a central east–west street running through Ottawa, Ontario, Canada. Originally known as "Maria Street" (west of Waller) and "Theodore Street" (east of Waller), it was renamed in honour of Canadian Prime Minister Sir Wilfrid Laurier. Laurier House, the residence of Prime Ministers Laurier and William Lyon Mackenzie King, is located at 335 Laurier Avenue East at the corner of Laurier Avenue East and Chapel Street.

== Route ==
Bronson Avenue to the Rideau Canal

Laurier runs through the heart of downtown Ottawa. The south side of Laurier from Bronson east is almost all high-rises, starting with residential towers at Bronson, and commercial and government office buildings further to the east. Located on the south side of Laurier, between Bank Street and O'Connor is the main building of the Canadian Department of Finance. The main branch of the Ottawa Public Library is located at the intersection of Laurier and Metcalfe, and Ottawa City Hall is on the south side of Laurier between Elgin Street and Queen Elizabeth Driveway. Next door to Ottawa City Hall is Cartier Square Drill Hall, from which the daily 'Changing of the Guard' procession begins. The north side of Laurier, across from City Hall, is Confederation Square. Laurier Avenue was selected in 2011 as the first street in Ottawa to feature a fully segregated bike lane.

Rideau Canal to Rideau River

The street crosses the Rideau Canal over the Laurier Avenue Bridge and passes the Department of National Defence Headquarters before heading through the campus of the University of Ottawa. It then goes through the neighbourhood of Sandy Hill, passing near many embassies. The embassy of Iraq (previously the embassy of Angola) is prominent on the corner of Laurier and King Edward. The street finally ends at Charlotte just before it meets the Rideau River, at Strathcona Park, quite near to the Russian embassy.
