= Zoé Laurier =

Former spouse of Wilfrid Laurier

Zoé, Lady Laurier
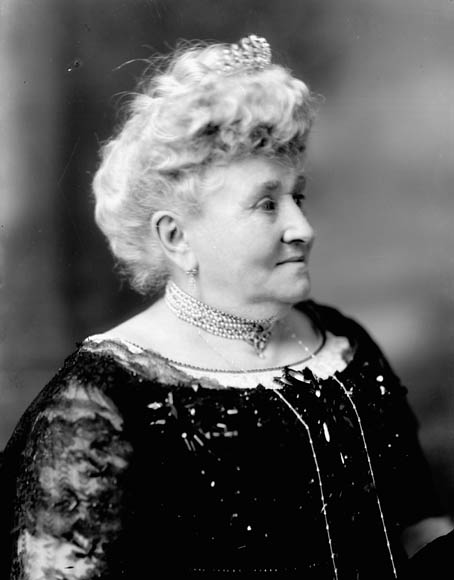
- Lady Laurier in December 1911
- Born: Zoé Lafontaine; June 26, 1841; Montreal, Canada East
- Died: November 1, 1921 (aged 80); Ottawa, Ontario, Canada
- Resting place: Notre Dame Cemetery, Ottawa, Ontario, Canada
- Known for: Spouse of the Prime Minister of Canada
- Spouse: Wilfrid Laurier (m. 1868)

Zoé, Lady Laurier (née Lafontaine; June 26, 1841 – November 1, 1921), was the wife of Sir Wilfrid Laurier, the seventh Prime Minister of Canada.

== Biography ==
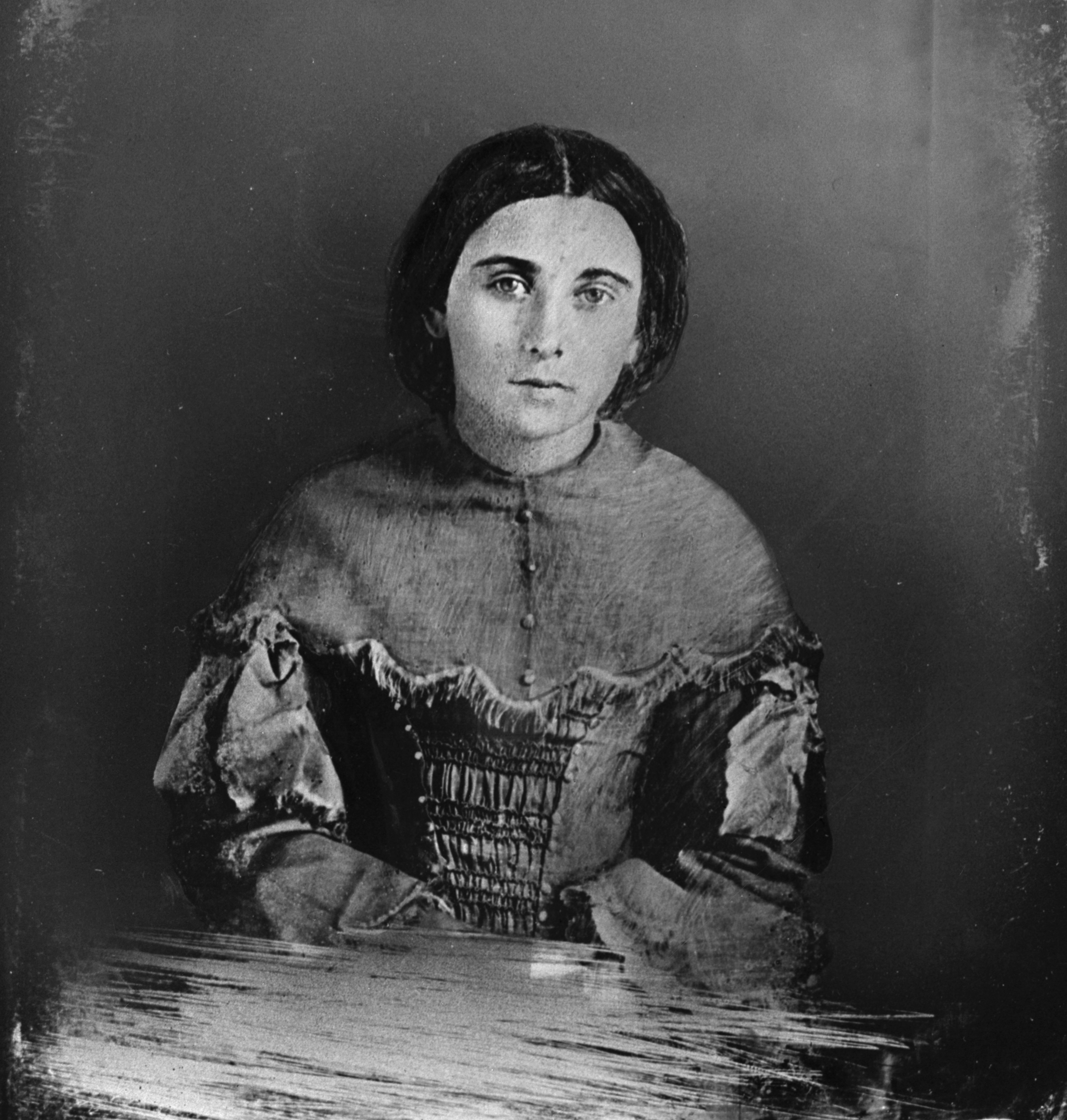
Portrait of Miss Zoë Lafontaine.

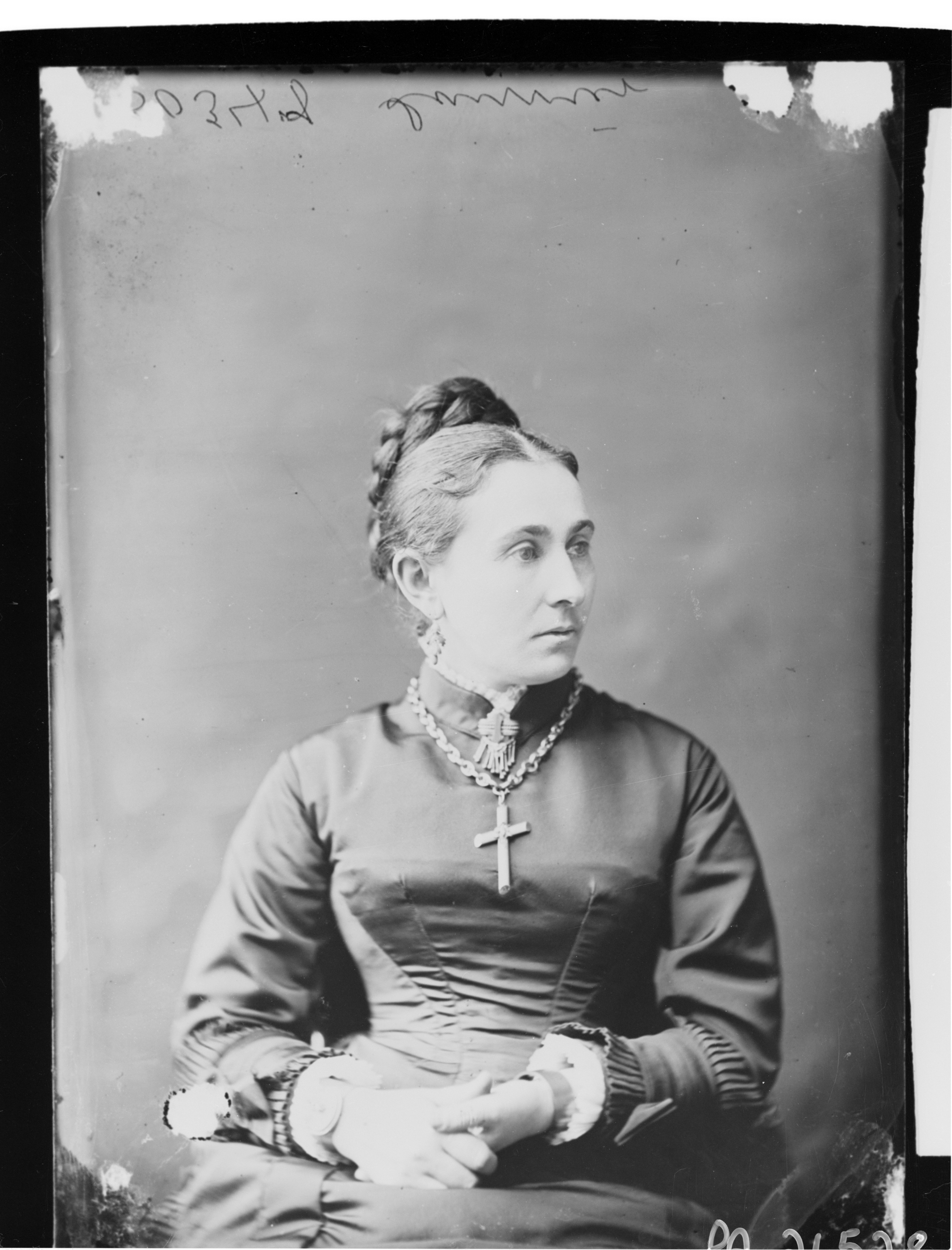
Madame Zoë Laurier, April 1878. By William James Topley in Ottawa.

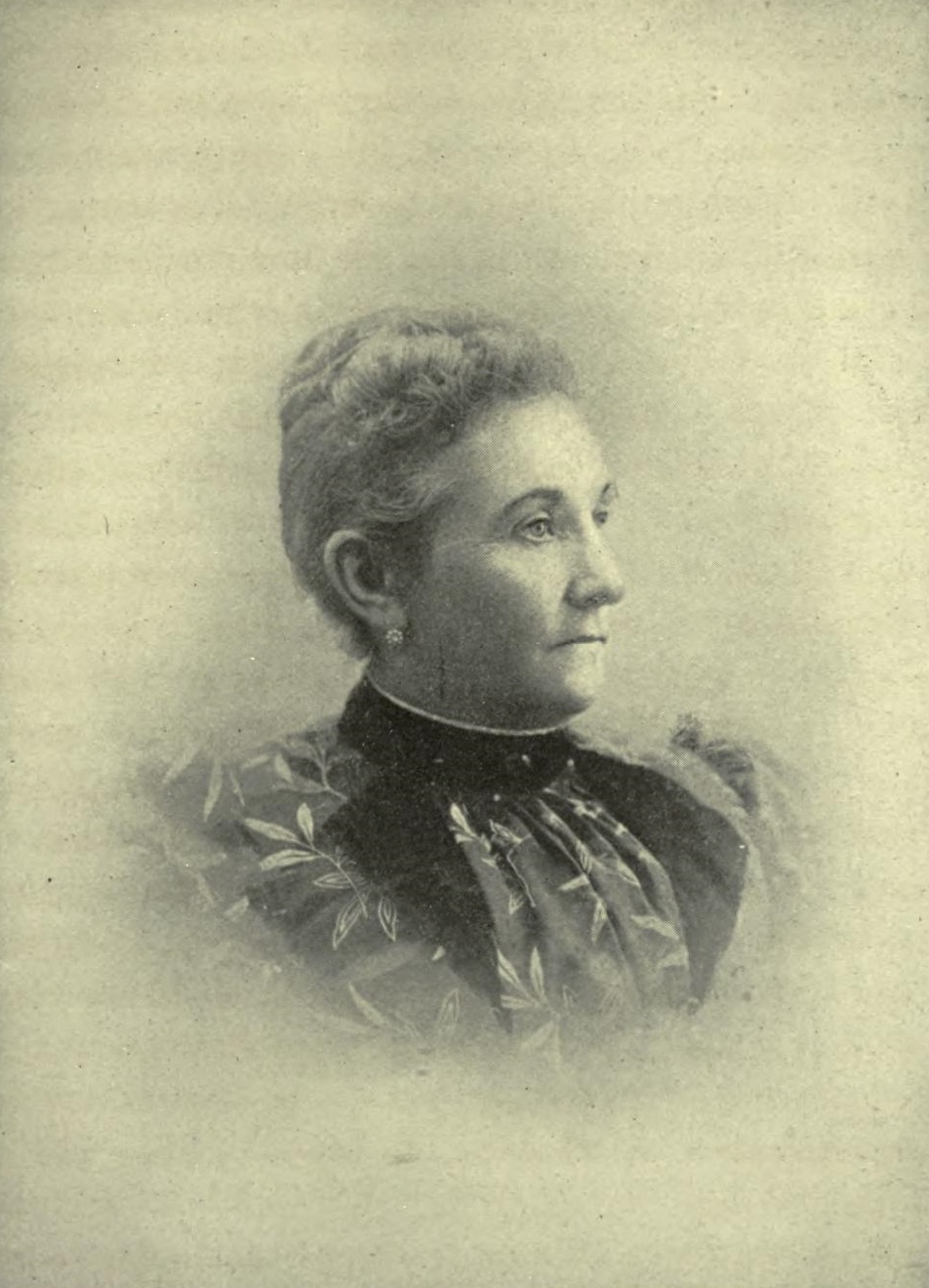
Portrait of Lady Laurier

Zoé Lafontaine was born on 27 June 1841 to Godefroy-Napoleon Robert Lafontaine and Zoé Tessier dite Lavigne (Note: The genealogist Jean-Jacques Lefebvre is mistaken when he refers to her as Zoé Tessier.) in Montreal. She was baptized on 28 June at the Notre-Dame Basilica.

In Montreal, Lafontaine was educated at the School of the Bon Pasteur, and at the Convent of the Sisters of the Sacred Heart, St. Vincent de Paul. She was one of the vice presidents on the formation of the National Council of Women of Canada and was honorary vice president of the Victorian Order of Nurses.

In 1861, Lafontaine first met her future husband, Sir Wilfrid Laurier, at the home of Dr. Séraphin Gauthier, where both were boarding. During this time she was a piano teacher to Gauthier's children.

On May 13, 1868, the two were married in the Saint-Jacques Cathedral. The couple lived at Arthabaskaville until they moved to Ottawa in 1896. Ultimately, their union was childless, to Laurier's dismay.

On 17 February 1919, Laurier died. Lafontaine outlived her husband by more than two years. She died in Ottawa on November 1, 1921, at the age of 80.

Her will bequeathed her Ottawa home to William Lyon Mackenzie King.

== Legacy ==
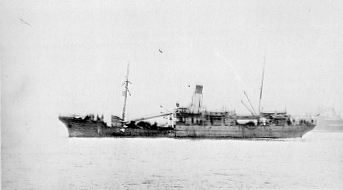
The Canadian Coast Guard ship Lady Laurier

- Graham-Laurier Provincial Park, in British Columbia, has a lake named 'Lady Laurier Lake' and a mountain named 'Lady Laurier Mountain', which is the highest peak in the park.
- In 1985, a lounge in the Château Laurier was named in her honour. The lounge overlooks Rideau Street.
- CGS Lady Laurier, a Canadian Coast Guard ship was christened after her. The ship operated between 1902 and 1960.
- DuVillage, a specialty cheesemaker, has a soft cheese called "Lady Laurier d'Arthabaska".

== See also ==
- Spouse of the prime minister of Canada
