= Laurier House =

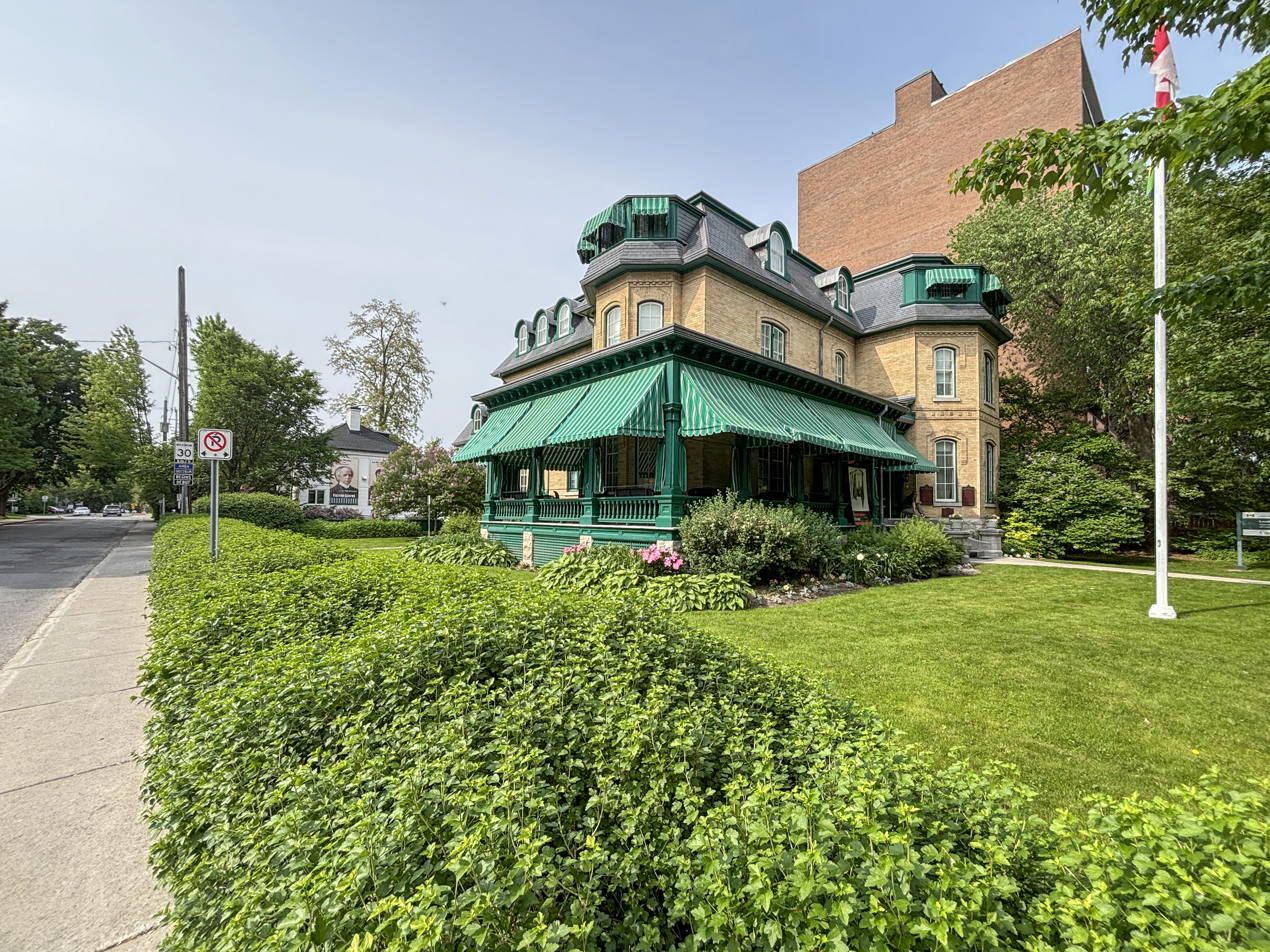
- Interactive map of Laurier House
- Location: 335 Laurier Avenue East; Ottawa, Ontario; K1N 6R4
- Coordinates: 45°25′38″N 075°40′40″W
- Built: 1878
- Original use: Residence
- Current use: Museum
- Architect: James Mather
- Governing body: Parks Canada
- Website: Laurier House NHS

National Historic Site of Canada
- Official name: Laurier House National Historic Site
- Designated: 29 May 1956
- Reference no.: 464

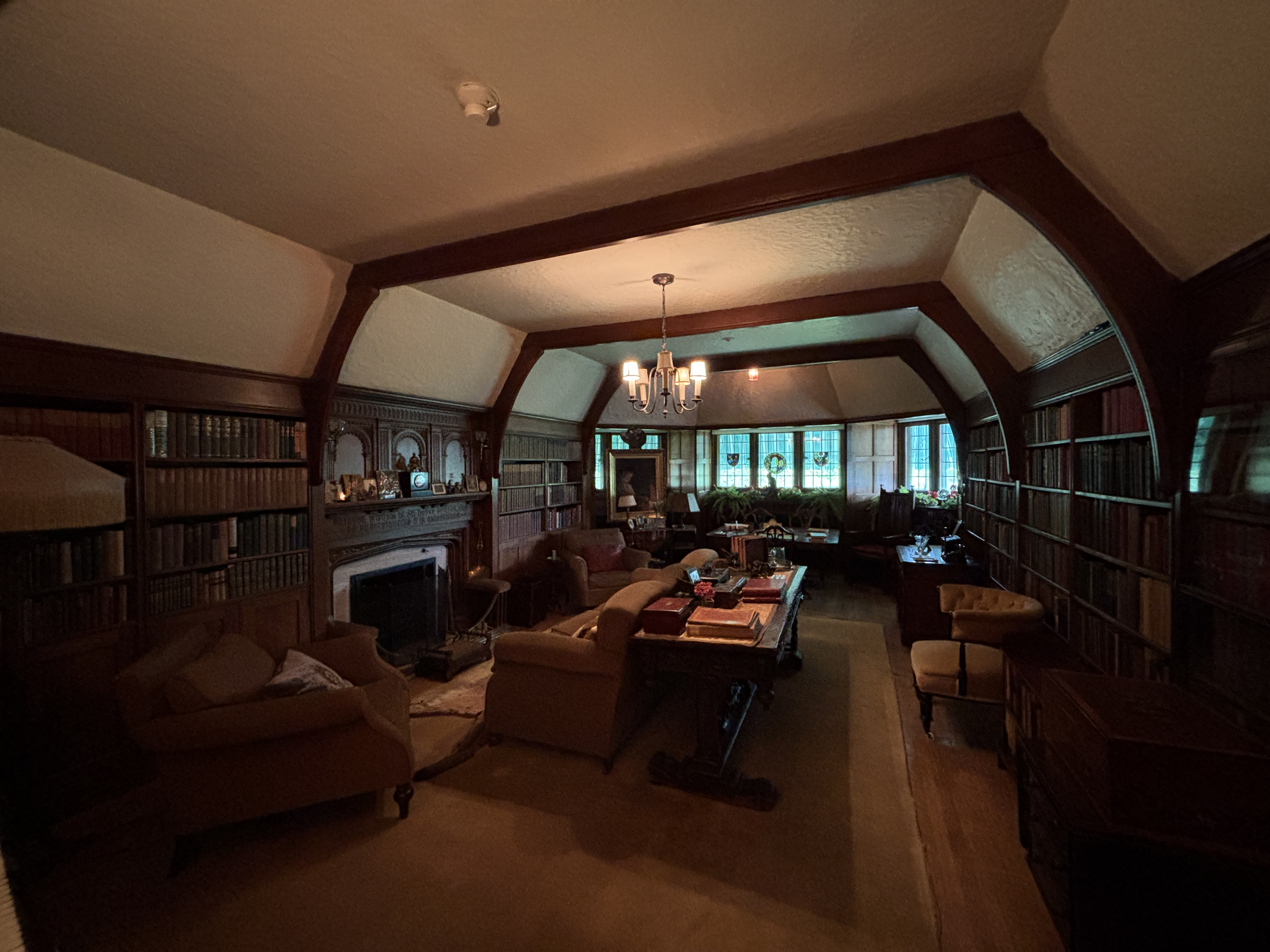
Mackenzie King's Library in Level 3

Laurier House (French: Maison Laurier) is a National Historic Site in Ottawa, Ontario, Canada (in the Sandy Hill district). It was formerly the residence of two Canadian prime ministers: Sir Wilfrid Laurier (for whom the house is named) and William Lyon Mackenzie King. The home is now a historic house museum that is open to the public for guided tours from Victoria Day in May until Thanksgiving in October. Its address is 335 Laurier Avenue East.

== History ==
The house was built in 1878, but it had significant later alterations. It now exhibits elements of the Italianate manner, as well as traces of Second Empire style.

Laurier lived there from 1897 until his death in 1919. His wife, Zoé Laurier, willed the house to Mackenzie King upon her death in 1921. King then lived there from 1923 until his death in 1950, and he willed the house to the Canadian Crown.

The Cabinet then briefly considered designating the home as the permanent official residence of the prime minister. However, the prime minister at the time, Louis St. Laurent, opposed designating it as such. Instead, 24 Sussex Drive—a property the Crown had acquired a few years earlier through expropriation—was selected and designated as the prime minister's official residence in 1951.

Many distinguished guests of Canada were received at this house, such as King George VI, Sir Winston Churchill, Charles de Gaulle, Franklin D. Roosevelt, and others.

Under the terms of the Laurier House Act 1951, the home and its grounds were entrusted to the National Capital Commission (NCC), the Department of Public Works, and Library and Archives Canada. Since 1988, the house has been administered by Parks Canada as part of the national park system, operating it as a public museum. However, the NCC continues to maintain the grounds, and the national archives retain ownership of all archival materials in the house.

In 2022, a memorial plaque was installed to the first Canadian code-breaking unit.

== Gallery ==
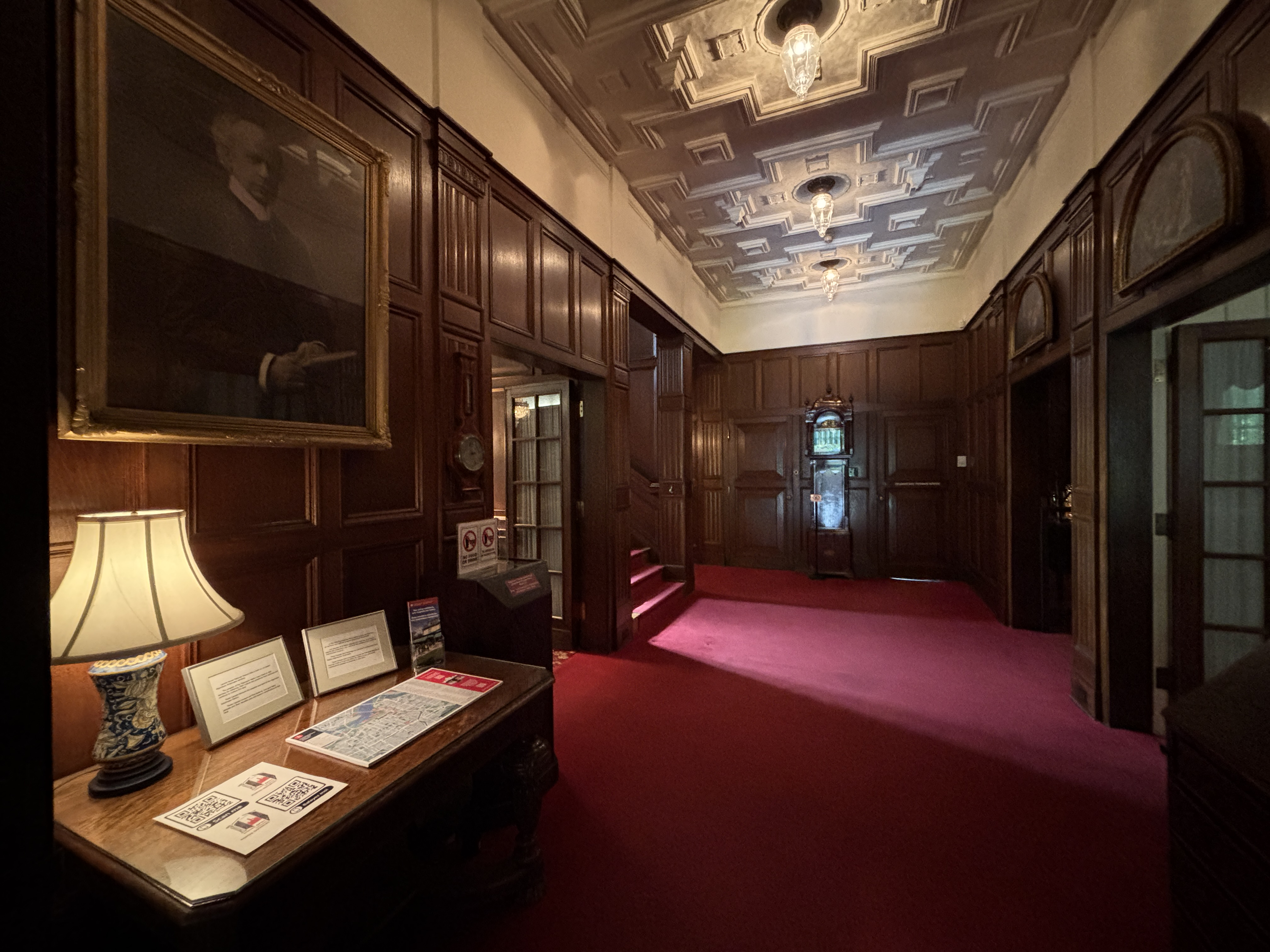
Foyer

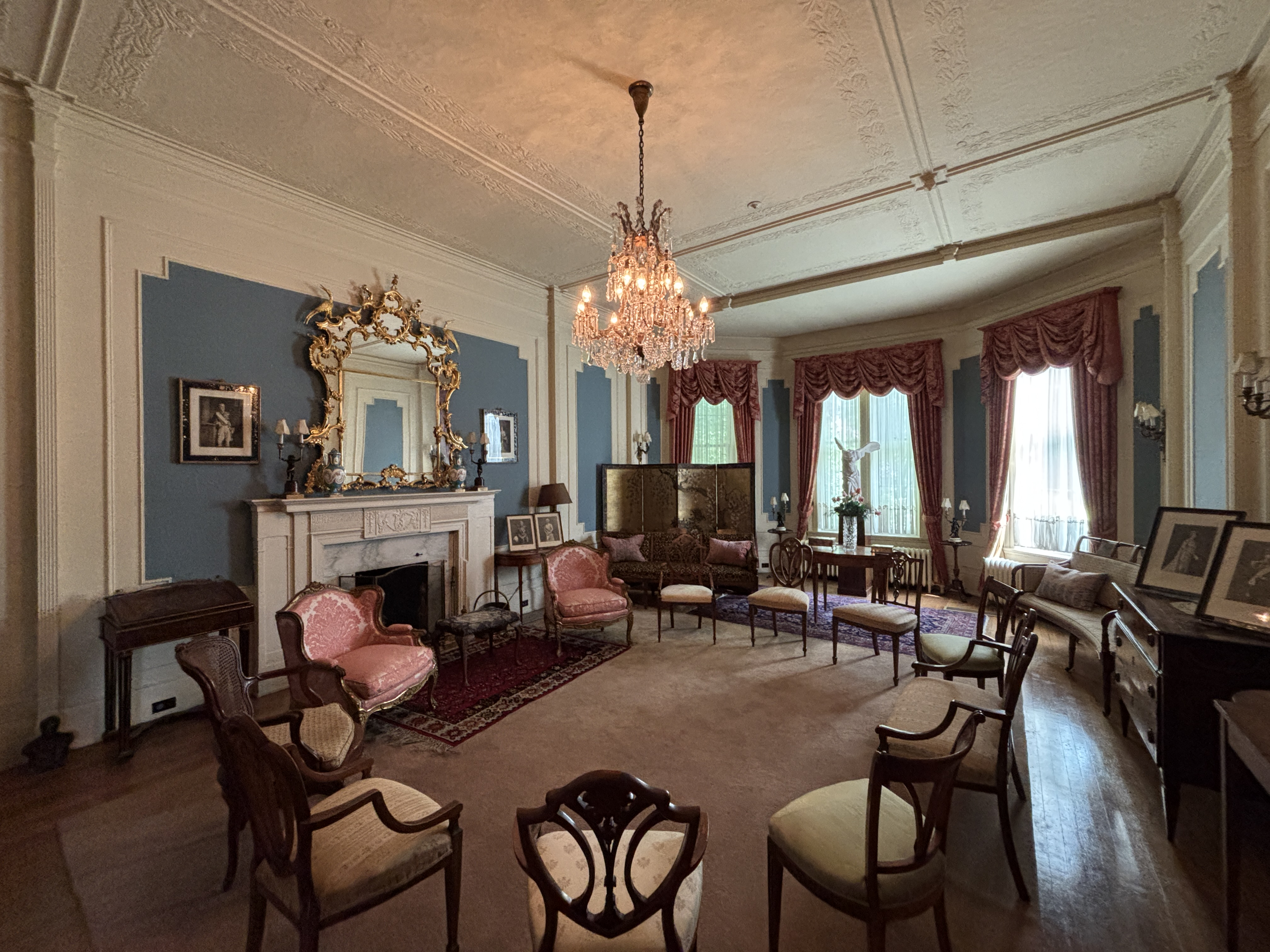
Drawing Room

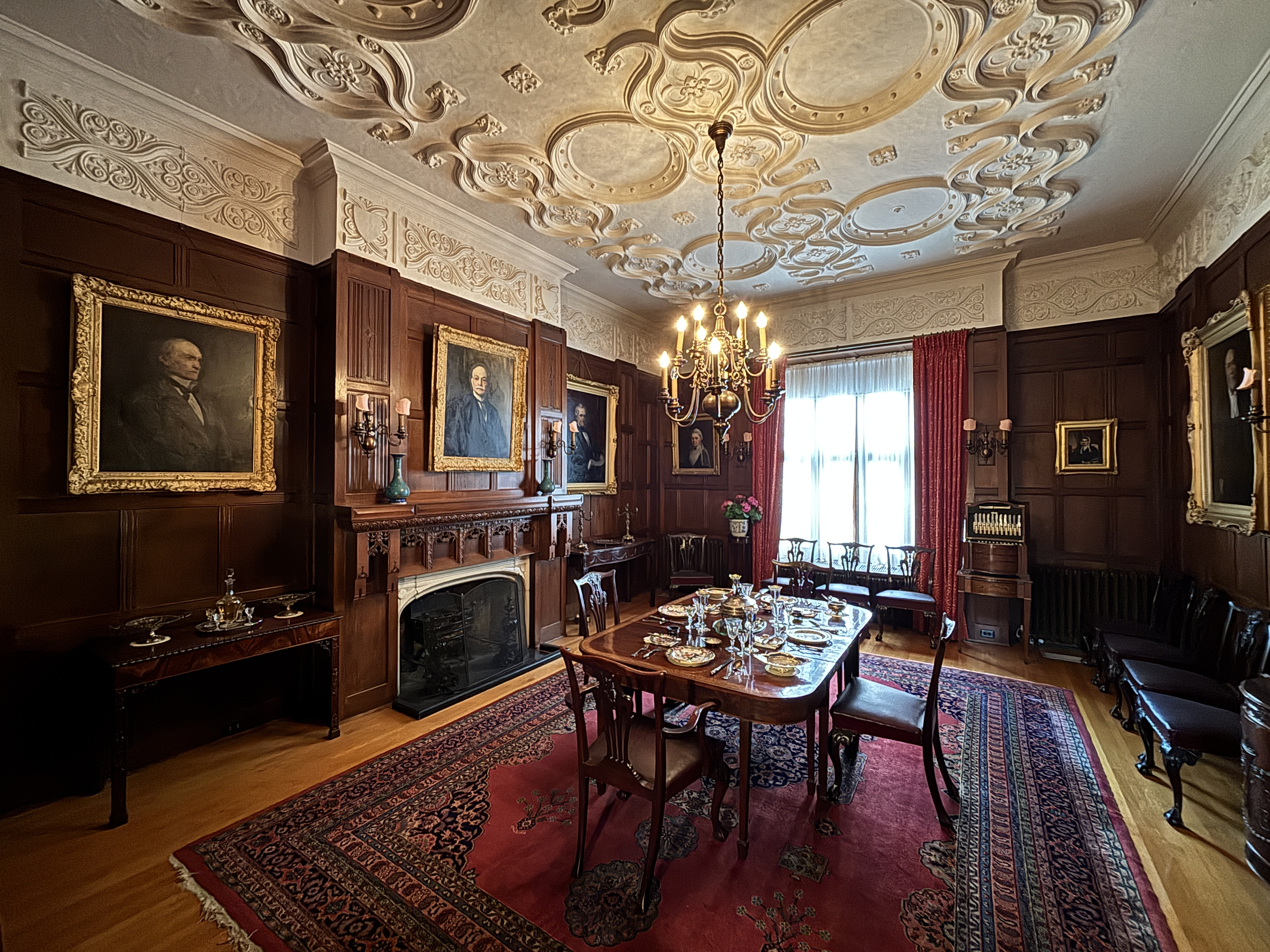
Dining Room

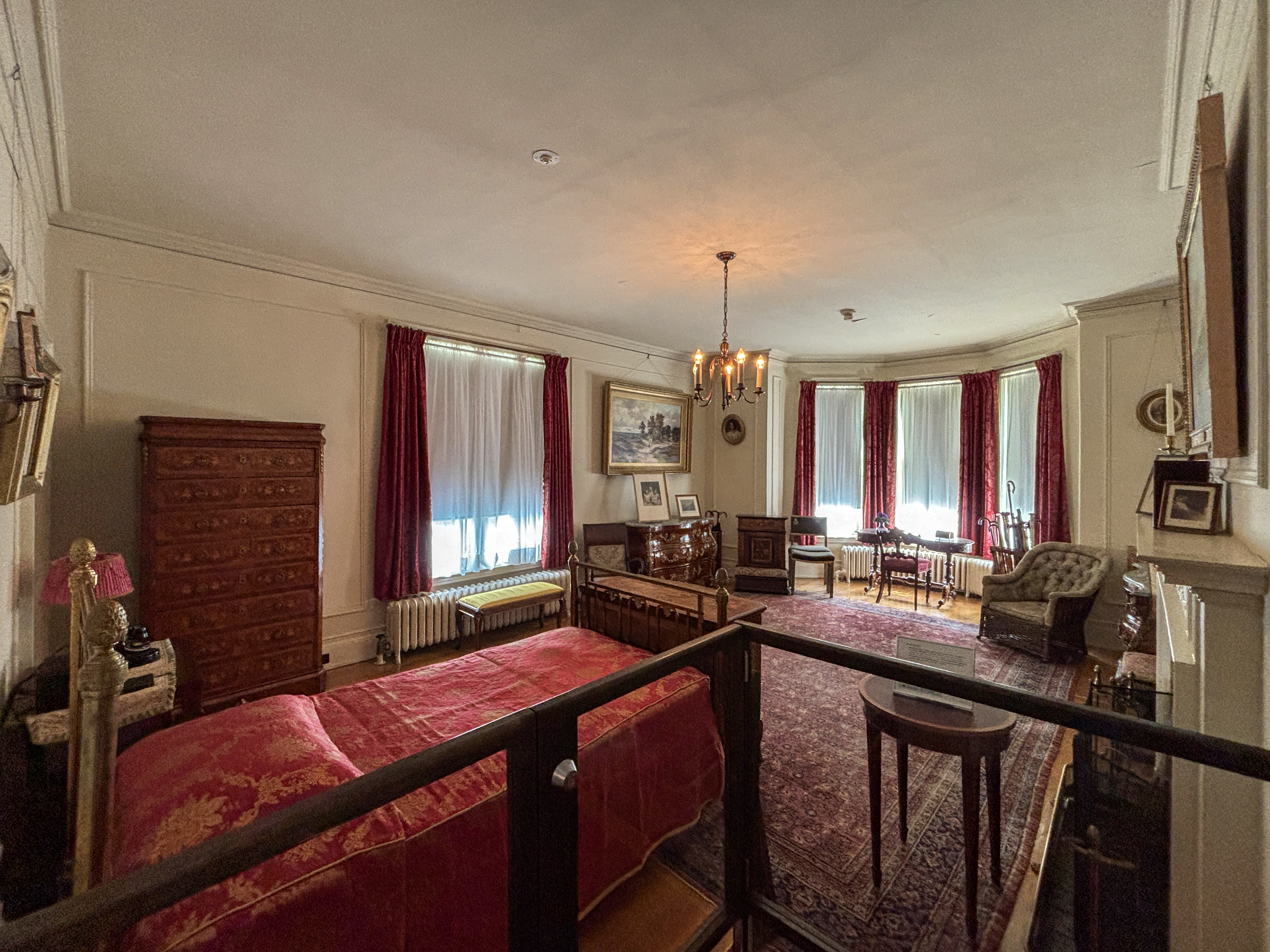
Primary Bedroom

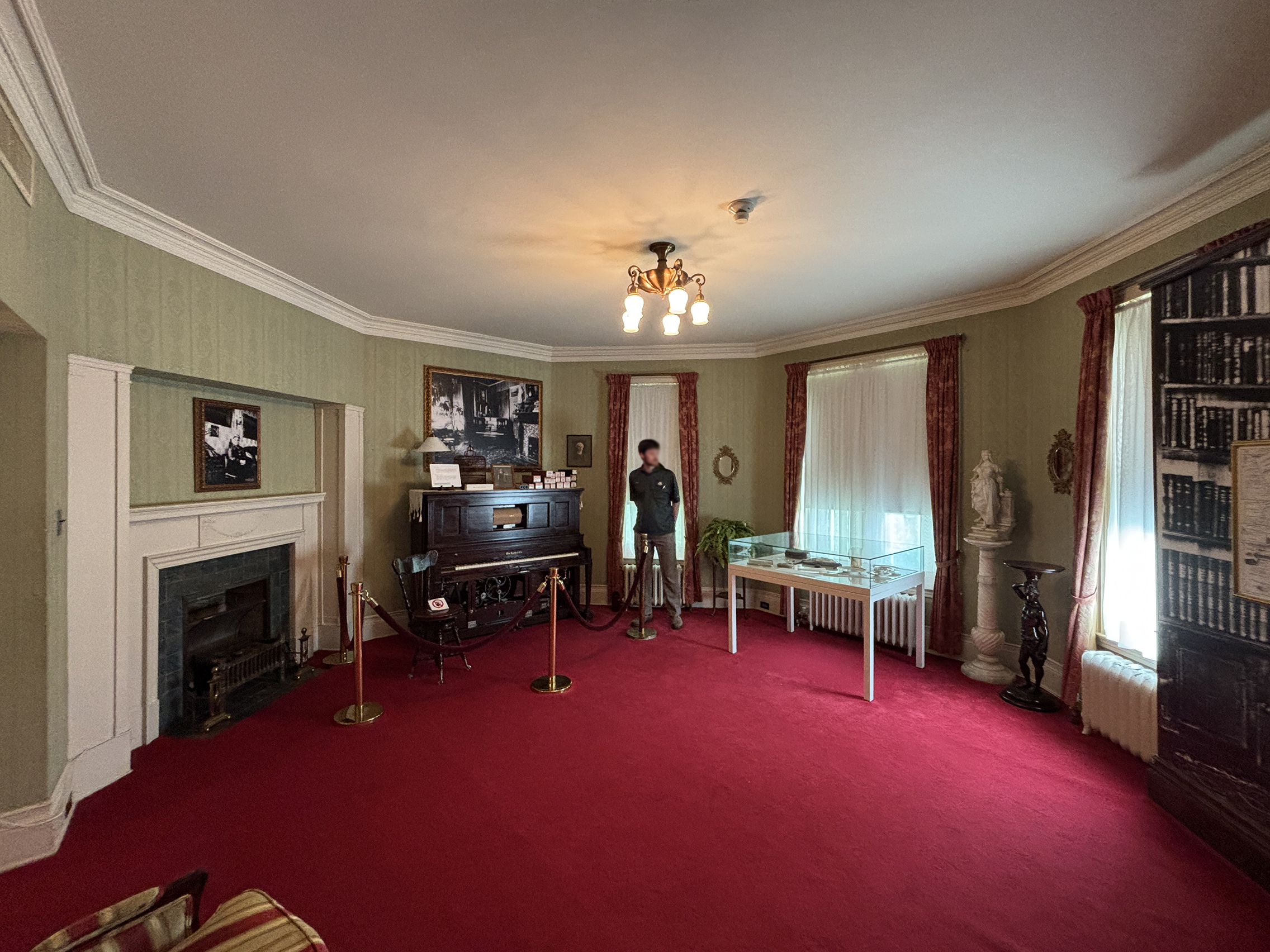
Room with piano

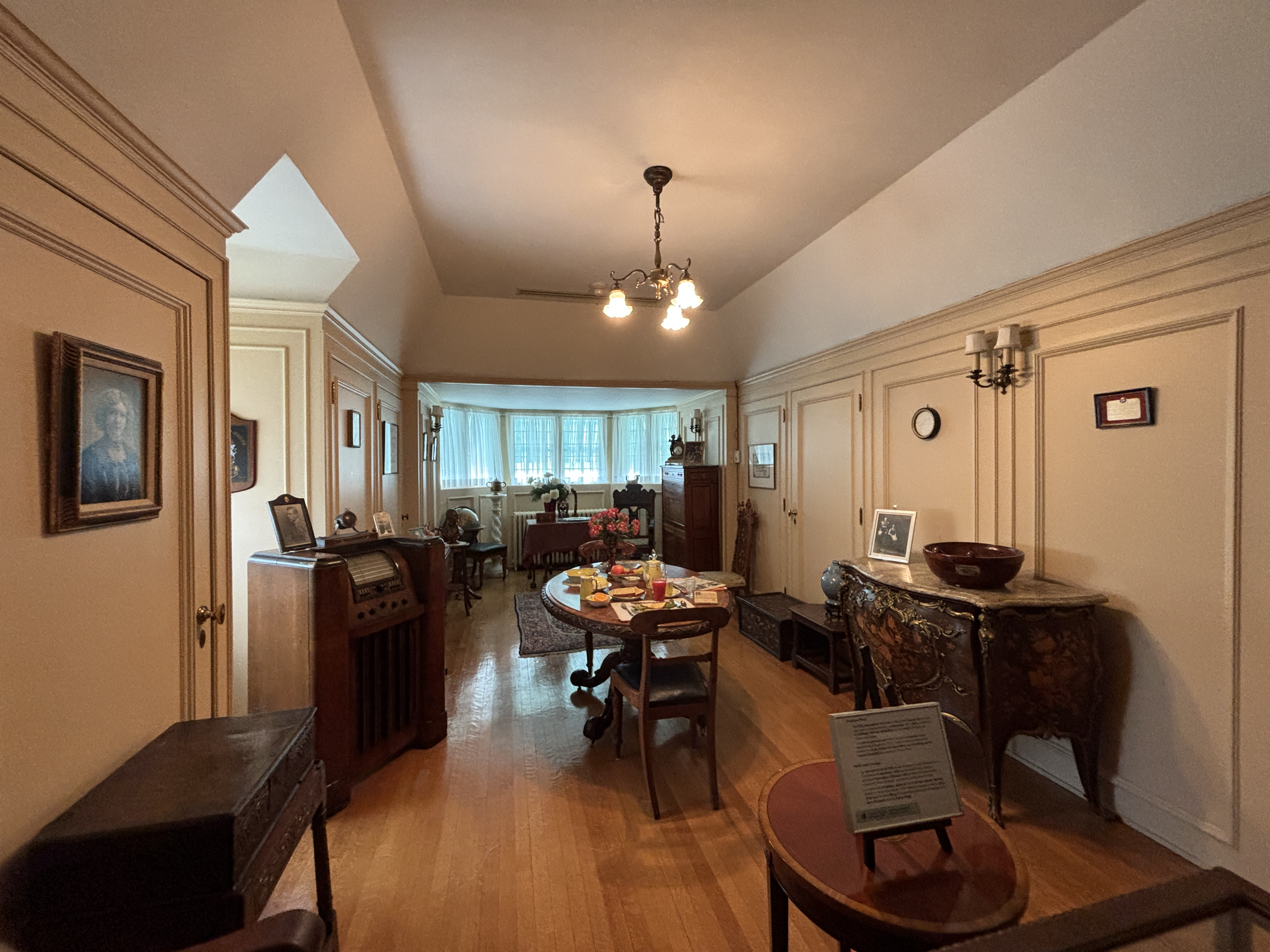
Breakfast Room
