= Wilfrid Laurier =

Prime Minister of Canada from 1896 to 1911

The Right Honourable Sir Wilfrid Laurier PC GCMG KC
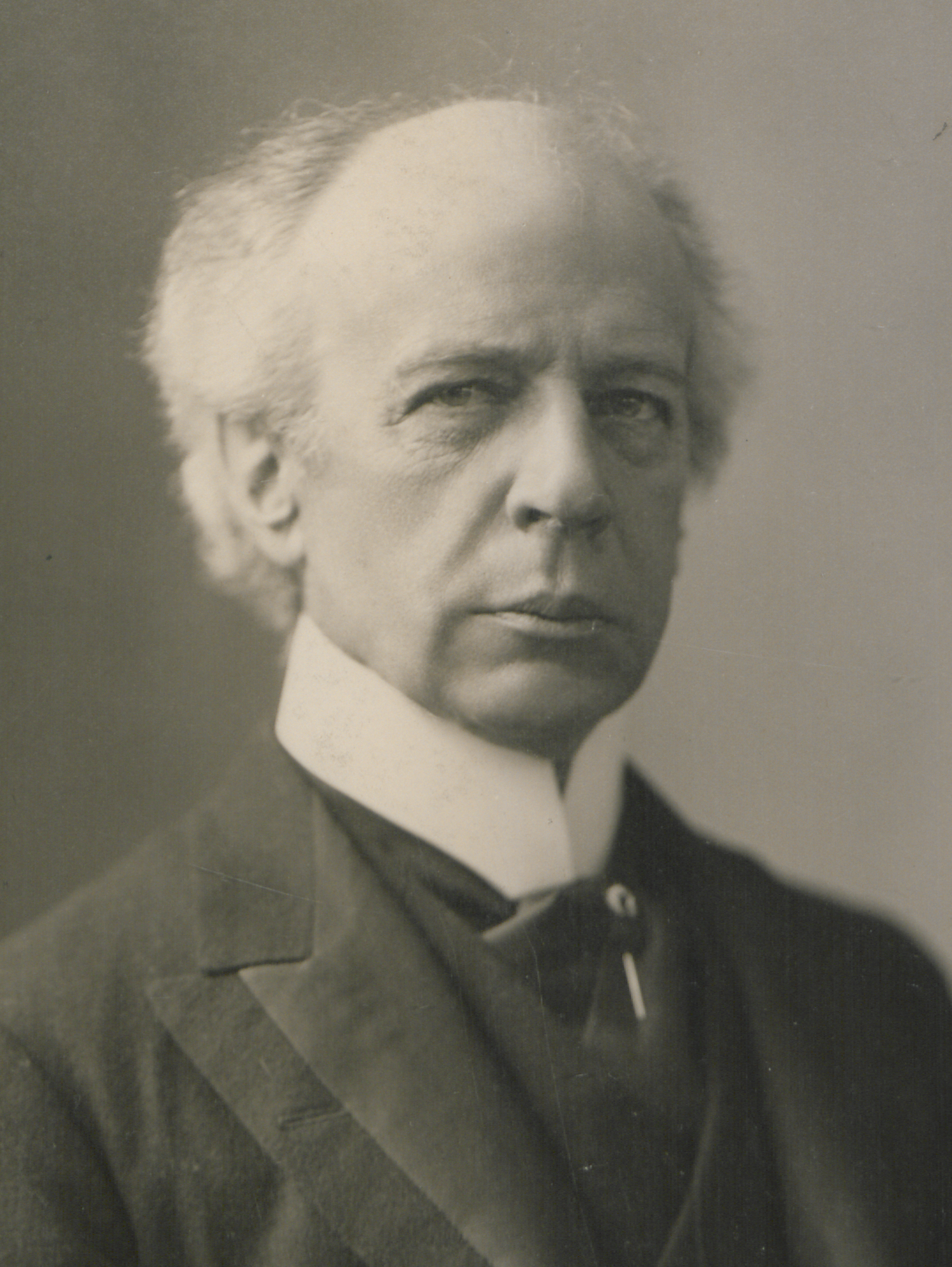
- Laurier in 1906

7th Prime Minister of Canada
- In office July 11, 1896 – October 6, 1911
- Monarchs: Victoria; Edward VII; George V
- Governors General: The Earl of Aberdeen; The Earl of Minto; The Earl Grey
- Preceded by: Charles Tupper
- Succeeded by: Robert Borden

Leader of the Liberal Party
- In office June 2, 1887 – February 17, 1919
- Preceded by: Edward Blake
- Succeeded by: Daniel Duncan McKenzie (interim)

Minister of Inland Revenue
- In office October 8, 1877 – October 8, 1878
- Prime Minister: Alexander Mackenzie
- Preceded by: Joseph-Édouard Cauchon
- Succeeded by: Louis François Georges Baby

Member of Parliament for Quebec East
- In office November 11, 1877 – February 17, 1919
- Preceded by: Isidore Thibaudeau
- Succeeded by: Ernest Lapointe

Member of Parliament for Drummond—Arthabaska
- In office January 22, 1874 – October 27, 1877
- Preceded by: Pierre-Nérée Dorion
- Succeeded by: Désiré Olivier Bourbeau

Member of the Legislative Assembly of Quebec for Drummond-Arthabaska
- In office July 1871 – January 22, 1874
- Preceded by: Edward John Hemming
- Succeeded by: William John Watts

Personal details
- Born: Henri Charles Wilfrid Laurier; November 20, 1841 Saint-Lin, Canada East, United Province of Canada
- Died: February 17, 1919 (aged 77) Ottawa, Ontario, Canada
- Resting place: Notre Dame Cemetery, Ottawa, Ontario
- Party: Liberal
- Other political affiliations: Laurier Liberal (1917–1919)
- Spouse: Zoé Lafontaine (m. 1868)
- Education: McGill University (LL.L., 1864)
- Profession: Lawyer

Military service
- Allegiance: Canada
- Branch/service: Canadian militia
- Years of service: 1869–1878
- Rank: Ensign; Lieutenant
- Unit: Arthabaskaville Infantry Company
- Battles/wars: Fenian Raids (1870)

Sir Henri Charles Wilfrid Laurier (Note: /ˈlɒrieɪ/ LORR-ee-ay; French: [wilfʁid loʁje]) (November 20, 1841 – February 17, 1919) was the seventh prime minister of Canada from 1896 to 1911. The first French Canadian prime minister, his 15-year tenure remains the longest uninterrupted term of office among Canadian prime ministers and his nearly 45 years of service in the House of Commons is a record for the House. Laurier is best known for his compromises between English and French Canada.

Laurier studied law at McGill University and practised as a lawyer before being elected to the Legislative Assembly of Quebec in 1871. He was then elected as a member of Parliament (MP) in the 1874 federal election. As an MP, Laurier gained a large personal following among French Canadians and the Québécois. After serving as minister of inland revenue under Prime Minister Alexander Mackenzie from 1877 to 1878, Laurier became leader of the Liberal Party in 1887. He lost the 1891 federal election to Prime Minister John A. Macdonald's Conservative Party. However, controversy surrounding the Conservative government's handling of the Manitoba Schools Question gave Laurier's Liberal Party a victory in the 1896 federal election. He led the Liberals to three more majority governments in 1900, 1904, and 1908.

As prime minister, Laurier resolved the Manitoba Schools Question by persuading the Manitoba government to permit Catholic students to receive a Catholic education on a school-by-school basis. While this compromise drew criticism from some French Canadians, it earned him the nickname "the Great Conciliator" for balancing the interests of French and English Canada. Laurier also sharply increased immigration levels, oversaw the creation of the provinces of Alberta and Saskatchewan in 1905, and initiated the Grand Trunk Pacific and National Transcontinental railway projects. In foreign policy, Laurier promoted Canada's autonomy within the British Empire. His government dispatched a volunteer force to fight in the Second Boer War after Britain requested Canadian troops, established the Department of External Affairs, and enacted the Naval Service Act to create Canada's own navy.

Laurier's proposed reciprocity agreement with the United States to lower tariffs became a main issue in the 1911 federal election. The Liberals were defeated by the Conservatives led by Robert Borden. Despite his defeat, Laurier stayed on as Liberal leader. During World War I and the Conscription Crisis of 1917, Laurier faced divisions within the Liberal Party as pro-conscription Liberals joined Borden's Unionist government. The anti-conscription faction of the Liberal Party, led by Laurier, became the Laurier Liberals, though the group was heavily defeated by Borden's Unionists in the 1917 federal election. Laurier remained Opposition leader until his death in 1919. Laurier is ranked among the top three of Canadian prime ministers. At 31 years and 8 months, Laurier is the longest-serving leader of a major Canadian political party. He is the fourth-longest serving prime minister of Canada, behind Pierre Trudeau, John A. Macdonald, and William Lyon Mackenzie King.

== Early life (1841–1871) ==
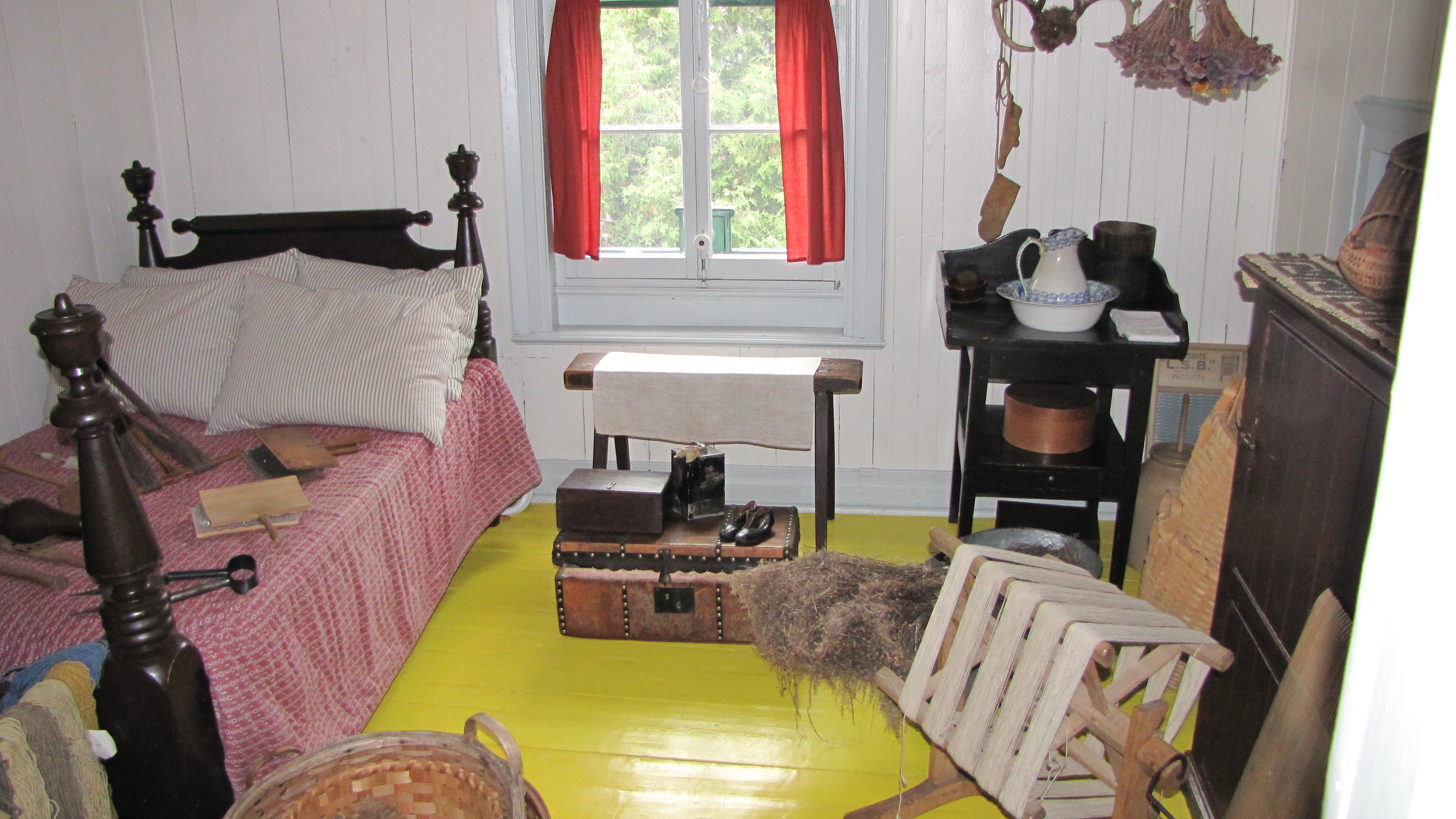
Bedroom at Sir Wilfrid Laurier National Historic Site, Saint-Lin-Laurentides, Quebec

=== Childhood ===
The second child of Carolus Laurier and Marcelle Martineau, Henri Charles Wilfrid Laurier was born in Saint-Lin, Canada East (modern-day Saint-Lin-Laurentides, Quebec), on November 20, 1841. He was a sixth-generation French Canadian, with partial Acadian ancestry through his mother. His ancestor François Cottineau, dit Champlaurier, came to Canada from Saint-Claud, France. Laurier grew up in a family where politics was a staple of talk and debate. His father, an educated man having liberal ideas, enjoyed a certain degree of prestige about town. In addition to being a farmer and surveyor, he also occupied such sought-after positions as mayor, justice of the peace, militia lieutenant and school board member. At the age of 11, Wilfrid left home to study in New Glasgow, a neighbouring village largely inhabited by immigrants from Scotland. Over the next two years, he familiarized himself with the mentality, language and culture of English Canada, in addition to learning English. In 1854, Laurier attended the Collège de L'Assomption, an institution that staunchly followed Roman Catholicism. There, he started to develop an interest in politics, and began to endorse the ideology of liberalism, despite the school being heavily conservative.

=== Political beginnings ===
In September 1861, Laurier began studying law at McGill University. There, he met Zoé Lafontaine, who later became his wife. Laurier also discovered that he had chronic bronchitis, an illness that stuck with him for the rest of his life. At McGill, Laurier joined the Parti rouge, or Red Party, which was a centre-left political party that contested elections in Canada East. In 1864, Laurier graduated from McGill. Laurier continued being active within the Parti rouge, and from May 1864 to fall 1866, was vice president of the Institut canadien de Montréal, a literary society with ties to the Rouge. In August 1864, Laurier joined the Liberals of Lower Canada, an anti-Confederation group composed of both moderates and radicals. The group argued that Confederation would give too much power to the central, or federal government, and the group believed that Confederation would lead to discrimination towards French Canadians.

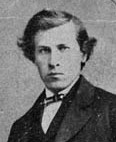
Laurier in his student days

Laurier then practised law in Montreal, though he initially struggled as a lawyer. He opened his first practice on October 27, 1864, but closed it within a month. He established his second office, but that closed within three months, due to a lack of clients. In March 1865, nearly bankrupt, Laurier established his third law firm, partnering with Médéric Lanctot, a lawyer and journalist who staunchly opposed Confederation. The two experienced some success, but in late 1866, Laurier was invited by fellow Rouge Antoine-Aimé Dorion to replace his recently deceased brother to become editor and run a newspaper, Le Défricheur.

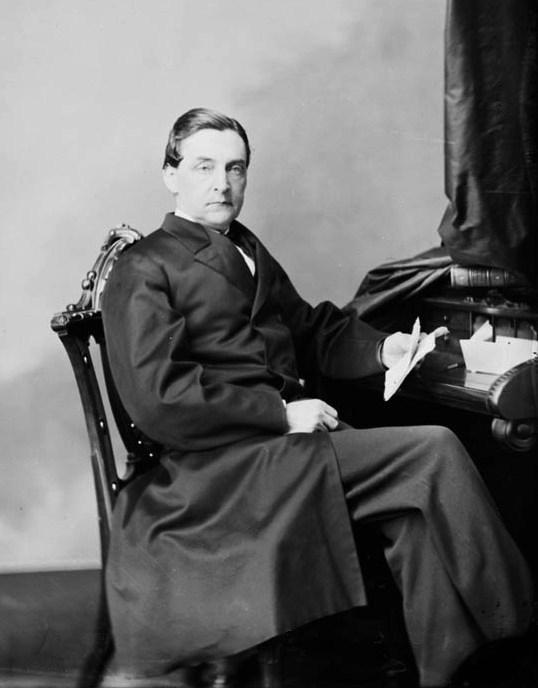
In 1866, Antoine-Aimé Dorion invited Laurier to become an editor for Le Défricheur.

Laurier moved to Victoriaville and began writing and controlling the newspaper from January 1, 1867. Laurier saw this as an opportunity to express his strong anti-Confederation views; in one instance he wrote, "Confederation is the second stage on the road to 'anglification' mapped out by Lord Durham...We are being handed over to the English majority...[We must] use whatever influence we have left to demand and obtain a free and separate government." On March 21, Le Défricheur was forced to shut down, as a result of financial issues and opposition from the local clergy. On July 1, Confederation was officially proclaimed and recognized, a defeat for Laurier.

Laurier decided to remain in Victoriaville. He slowly became well known across the town with a population of 730, and was even elected mayor not so long after he settled. In addition, he established a law practice which spanned for three decades and had four different partners. He made some money, but not enough to consider himself wealthy. During his period in Victoriaville, Laurier opted to accept Confederation and identify himself as a moderate liberal, as opposed to a radical liberal.

In 1869, while living in Victoriaville, Laurier was appointed an ensign in the Arthabaskaville Infantry Company. He was promoted to lieutenant in 1870, and from May to June was on active service at Saint-Hyacinthe during the second Fenian Raid. He continued to serve in the company until 1878, and in 1899 he was awarded the Canada General Service Medal for his service in 1870.

== Early political career (1871–1887) ==
=== Member of the Legislative Assembly of Quebec (1871–1874) ===
A member of the Quebec Liberal Party, Laurier was elected to the Legislative Assembly of Quebec for the riding of Drummond-Arthabaska in the 1871 Quebec general election, though the Liberal Party altogether suffered a landslide defeat. To win the provincial riding, Laurier campaigned on increasing funding for education, agriculture, and colonization. His career as a provincial politician was not noteworthy, and very few times did he make speeches in the legislature.

=== Member of Parliament (1874–1887) ===
Laurier resigned from the provincial legislature to enter federal politics as a Liberal. He was elected to the House of Commons in the January 22, 1874 election, representing the riding of Drummond—Arthabaska. In this election, the Liberals led by Alexander Mackenzie heavily triumphed, as a result of the Pacific Scandal that was initiated by the Conservative Party and the Conservative prime minister, John A. Macdonald. Laurier ran a simple campaign, denouncing Conservative corruption.

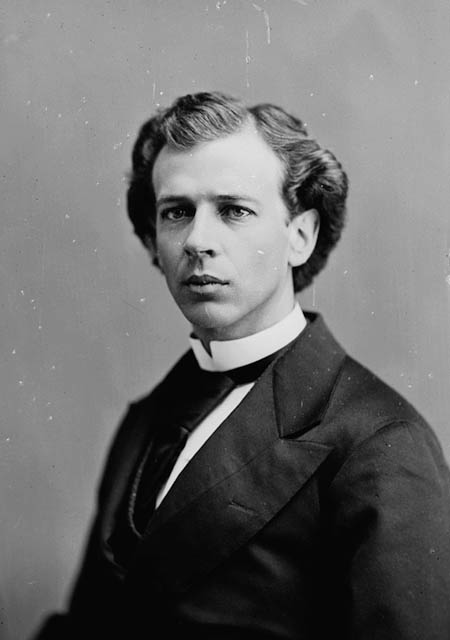
Laurier in 1874

As a member of Parliament (MP), Laurier's first mission was to build prominence by giving speeches in the House of Commons. He gained considerable attention when he delivered a speech on political liberalism on June 26, 1877, in front of about 2,000 people. He stated, "Liberal Catholicism is not political liberalism" and that the Liberal Party is not "a party composed of men holding perverse doctrines, with a dangerous tendency, and knowingly and deliberately progressing towards revolution." He also stated, "The policy of the Liberal party is to protect [our] institutions, to defend them and spread them, and, under the sway of those institutions, to develop the country’s latent resources. That is the policy of the Liberal party and it has no other." The speech helped Laurier become a leader of the Quebec wing of the Liberal Party.

From October 1877 to October 1878, Laurier served briefly in the Cabinet of Prime Minister Mackenzie as minister of inland revenue. However, his appointment triggered an October 27, 1877 ministerial by-election. In the by-election, he lost his seat in Drummond—Arthabaska. On November 11, he ran for the seat of Quebec East, which he narrowly won. From November 11, 1877, to his death on February 17, 1919, Laurier's seat was Quebec East. Laurier won reelection for Quebec East in the 1878 federal election, though the Liberals suffered a landslide defeat as a result of their mishandling of the Panic of 1873. Macdonald returned as prime minister.

Laurier called on Mackenzie to resign as leader, not least because of his handling of the economy. Mackenzie resigned as Liberal leader in 1880 and was succeeded by Edward Blake. Laurier, along with others, founded the Quebec newspaper, L’Électeur, to promote the Liberal Party. The Liberals were in opposition once again, and Laurier made use of that status, expressing his support for laissez-faire economics and provincial rights. The Liberals suffered a second consecutive defeat in 1882, with Macdonald winning his fourth term. Laurier continued to make speeches opposing the Conservative government's policies, though nothing notable came until 1885, when he spoke out against the execution of Métis leader Louis Riel, to whom the Macdonald government refused to grant clemency after he led the North-West Rebellion.

== Leader of the Official Opposition (1887–1896) ==
Edward Blake resigned as Liberal leader after leading them to back-to-back defeats in 1882 and 1887. Blake urged Laurier to run for leadership of the party. At first, Laurier refused as he was not keen to take such a powerful position, but later on accepted. After 13 and a half years, Laurier had already established his reputation. He was now a prominent politician who was known for leading the Quebec branch of the Liberal Party, known for defending French Canadian rights, and known for being a great orator who was a fierce parliamentary speaker. Over the next nine years, Laurier gradually built up his party's strength through his personal following both in Quebec and elsewhere in Canada.

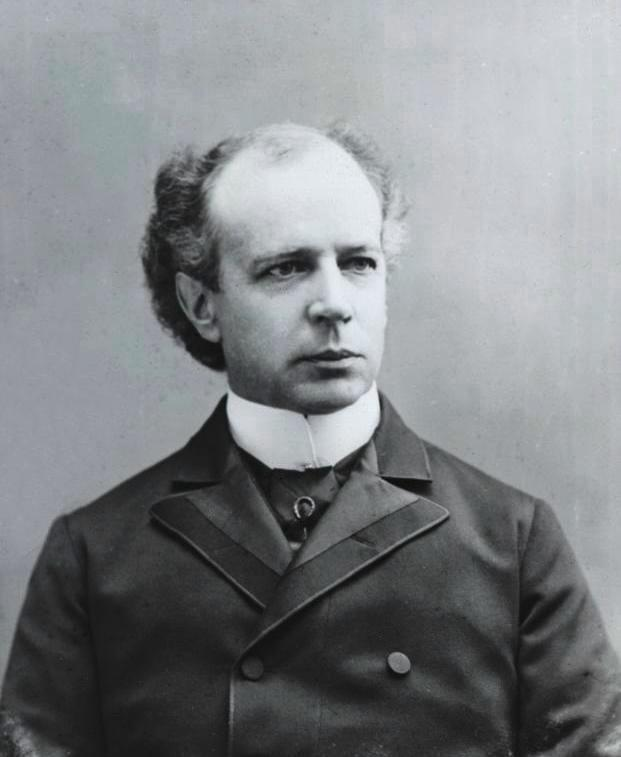
Opposition Leader Laurier, 1890

In the 1891 federal election, Laurier faced Conservative Prime Minister John A. Macdonald. Laurier campaigned in favour of reciprocity, or free trade, with the United States, contrary to Macdonald's position on the matter, who claimed that reciprocity would lead to American annexation of Canada. On election day, March 5, the Liberals gained 10 seats. The Liberals also won a majority of seats in Quebec for the first time since the 1874 election. Prime Minister Macdonald won his fourth consecutive federal election victory. The day after, Blake denounced the Liberal trade policy.

Laurier remained disillusioned for some time after his defeat. Multiple times he suggested he resign as leader, though he was persuaded not to by other Liberals. Only in 1893 did Laurier become encouraged again. On June 20 and 21, 1893, Laurier convened a Liberal convention in Ottawa. The convention established that unrestricted reciprocity was intended to develop Canada's natural resources and that keeping a customs tariff was intended to generate revenue. Laurier subsequently undertook a series of speaking tours to campaign on the convention's results. Laurier visited Western Canada in September and October 1894, promising to relax the Conservatives' National Policy, open the American market, and increase immigration.

Macdonald died only three months after he defeated Laurier in the 1891 election. After Macdonald's death, the Conservatives went through a period of disorganization with four short-serving leaders. The fourth prime minister after Macdonald, Charles Tupper, became prime minister in May 1896 after Mackenzie Bowell resigned as a result of a leadership crisis that was triggered by his attempts to offer a compromise for the Manitoba Schools Question, a dispute which emerged after the provincial government ended funding for Catholic schools in 1890. Tupper faced Laurier in the 1896 federal election, in which the schools dispute was a key issue. While Tupper supported overriding the provincial legislation to reinstate funding for the Catholic schools, Laurier was vague when giving his position on the matter, proposing an investigation of the issue first and then conciliation, a method he famously called, "sunny ways". On June 23, Laurier led the Liberals to their first victory in 22 years, despite losing the popular vote. Laurier's win was made possible by his sweep in Quebec.

== Prime Minister (1896–1911) ==
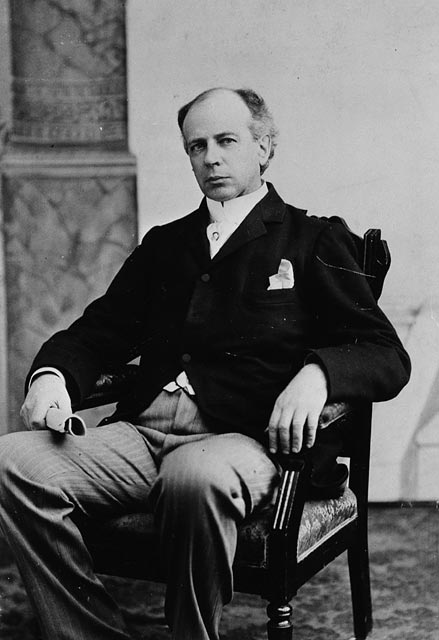
Laurier, 1897

=== Domestic policy ===
==== Manitoba Schools Question ====
One of Laurier's first acts as prime minister was to implement a solution to the Manitoba Schools Question, which had helped to bring down the Conservative government of Charles Tupper earlier in 1896. The Manitoba legislature had passed a law eliminating public funding for Catholic schooling. Supporters of Catholic schools argued that the new statute was contrary to the provisions of the Manitoba Act, 1870, which had a provision relating to school funding, but the courts rejected that argument and held that the new statute was constitutional. The Catholic minority in Manitoba then asked the federal government for support, and eventually, the Conservatives proposed remedial legislation to override Manitoba's legislation. Laurier opposed the remedial legislation on the basis of provincial rights and succeeded in blocking its passage by Parliament. Once elected, Laurier reached a compromise with the provincial premier, Thomas Greenway. Known as the Laurier-Greenway Compromise, the agreement did not allow separate Catholic schools to be re-established. However, religious instruction (Catholic education) would take place for 30 minutes at the end of each day, if requested by the parents of 10 children in rural areas or 25 in urban areas. Catholic teachers were allowed to be hired in the schools as long as there were at least 40 Catholic students in urban areas or 25 Catholic students in rural areas, and teachers could speak in French (or any other minority language) as long as there were enough Francophone students. This was seen by many as the best possible solution in the circumstances, however, some French Canadians criticized this move as it was done on an individual basis, and did not protect Catholic or French rights in all schools. Laurier called his effort to lessen the tinder in this issue "sunny ways" (French: voies ensoleillées).

==== Railway construction ====
Laurier's government introduced and initiated the idea of constructing a second transcontinental railway, the Grand Trunk Pacific Railway. The first transcontinental railway, the Canadian Pacific Railway, had limitations and was not able to meet everyone's needs. In the West, the railway was not able to transport everything produced by farmers and in the East, the railway did not reach into Northern Ontario and Northern Quebec. Laurier was in favour of a transcontinental line built entirely on Canadian land by private enterprise.

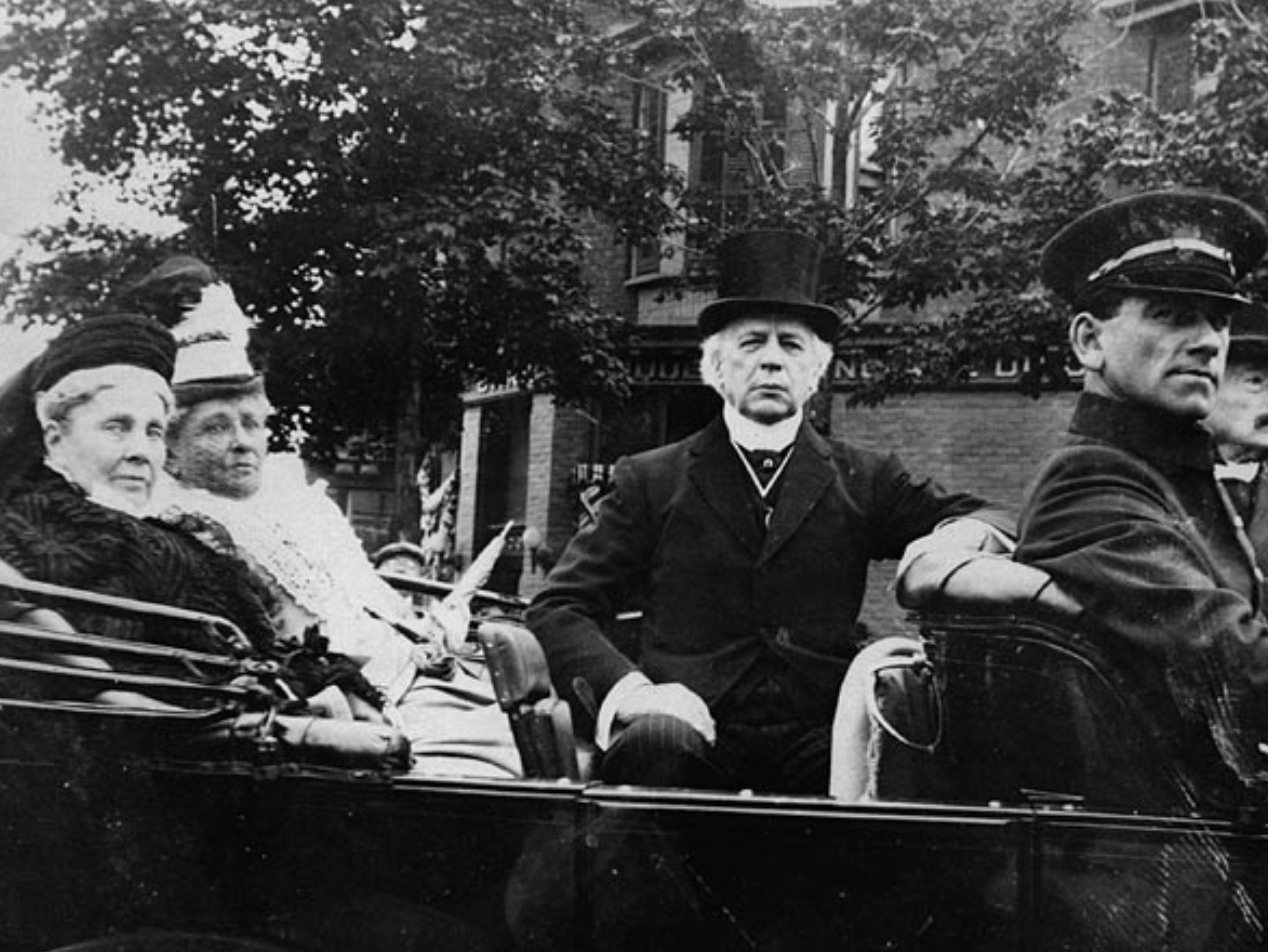
Laurier (middle) on a chauffeur-driven automobile

Laurier's government also constructed a third railway: the National Transcontinental Railway. It was made to provide Western Canada with direct rail connection to the Atlantic ports and to open up and develop Northern Ontario and Northern Quebec. Laurier believed that competition between the three railways would force one of the three, the Canadian Pacific Railway, to lower freight rates and thus please Western shippers who would contribute to the competition between the railways. Laurier initially reached out to Grand Trunk Railway and Canadian Northern Railway to build the National Transcontinental railway, but after disagreements emerged between the two companies, Laurier's government opted to build part of the railway itself. However, Laurier's government soon struck a deal with the Grand Trunk Pacific Railway Company (subsidiary of the Grand Trunk Railway Company) to build the western section (from Winnipeg to the Pacific Ocean) while the government would build the eastern section (from Winnipeg to Moncton). Once completed, Laurier's government would hand over the railway to the company for operation. Laurier's government gained criticism from the public due to the heavy cost to construct the railway.

==== Provincial and territorial boundaries ====
On September 1, 1905, through the Alberta Act and the Saskatchewan Act, Laurier oversaw creation of the provinces of Alberta and Saskatchewan, two provinces that were created out of part of the Northwest Territories. Laurier decided to create two provinces, arguing that one large province in the western prairies would have difficulties self-governing. This followed the enactment of the Yukon Territory Act by the Laurier Government in 1898, separating the Yukon from the North-West Territories. Also in 1898, Quebec was enlarged through the Quebec Boundary Extension Act.

==== Immigration ====
Laurier's government dramatically increased immigration to grow the economy. Between 1897 and 1914, at least a million immigrants arrived in Canada, and Canada's population increased by 40 percent. Laurier's immigration policy targeted the Prairies as he argued that it would increase farming production and benefit the agriculture industry.

Some in British Columbia grew alarmed at the arrival of people they considered "uncivilized" by Canadian standards, and the province adopted a whites-only policy. Although railways and large companies wanted to hire Asians, labour unions and many in the public at large were opposed. Both major parties went along with the majority of public opinion, with Laurier taking the lead. Scholars have argued that Laurier acted in terms of his racist views in restricting immigration from China and India, as shown by his support for the Chinese head tax. In 1900, Laurier raised the Chinese head tax to $100. In 1903, the head tax was raised to $500, but when a few Chinese did pay the $500, he proposed raising the sum to $1,000. This was not the first time Laurier showed racially charged action, and over the course of his time as a politician, he had a history of racist views and actions. In 1886, Laurier told the House of Commons that it was moral for Canada to take lands from “savage nations” so long as the government paid adequate compensation. Laurier also negotiated a limit to Japanese immigration into Canada.

In August 1911, Laurier approved the Order-in-Council P.C. 1911-1324 recommended by the minister of the interior, Frank Oliver. The order was approved by the cabinet on August 12, 1911. The order was intended to keep out Black Americans escaping segregation in the American south, stating that "the Negro race...is deemed unsuitable to the climate and requirements of Canada." The order was never called upon, as efforts by immigration officials had already reduced the number of Blacks migrating to Canada. The cabinet cancelled the order on October 5, 1911, the day before Laurier left office, claiming that Oliver, the minister of the interior, had not been present at the time of approval.

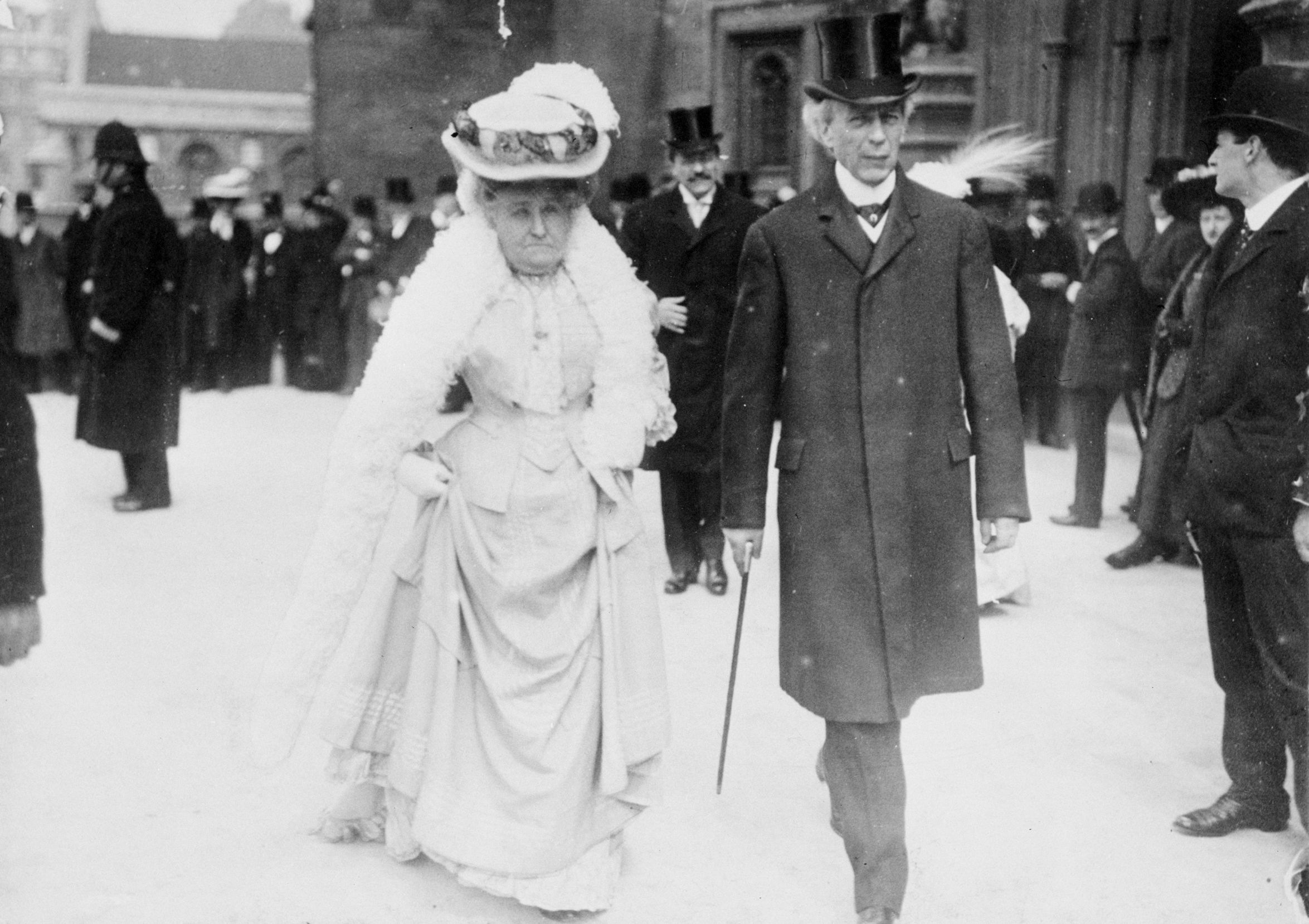
Sir Wilfrid Laurier with Zoé, Lady Laurier, in 1907

==== Social policy ====
In March 1906, Laurier's government introduced the Lord's Day Act after being persuaded by the Lord's Day Alliance. The act became effective on March 1, 1907. It prohibited business transactions from taking place on Sundays; it also restricted Sunday trade, labour, recreation, and newspapers. The act was supported by organized labour and the French Canadian Catholic hierarchy but was opposed by those who worked in the manufacturing and transportation sectors. It was also opposed by French Canadians due to them believing the federal government was interfering in a provincial matter; the Quebec government passed its own Lord’s Day Act that came into effect one day before the federal act did.

In 1907, Laurier's government passed the Industrial Disputes Investigation Act, which mandated conciliation for employers and workers before any strike in public utilities or mines, but did not make it necessary for the groups to accept the conciliators’ report.

In 1908, a system was introduced whereby annuities could be purchased from the government, the aim of which was to encourage voluntary provision for old age.

=== Foreign policy ===
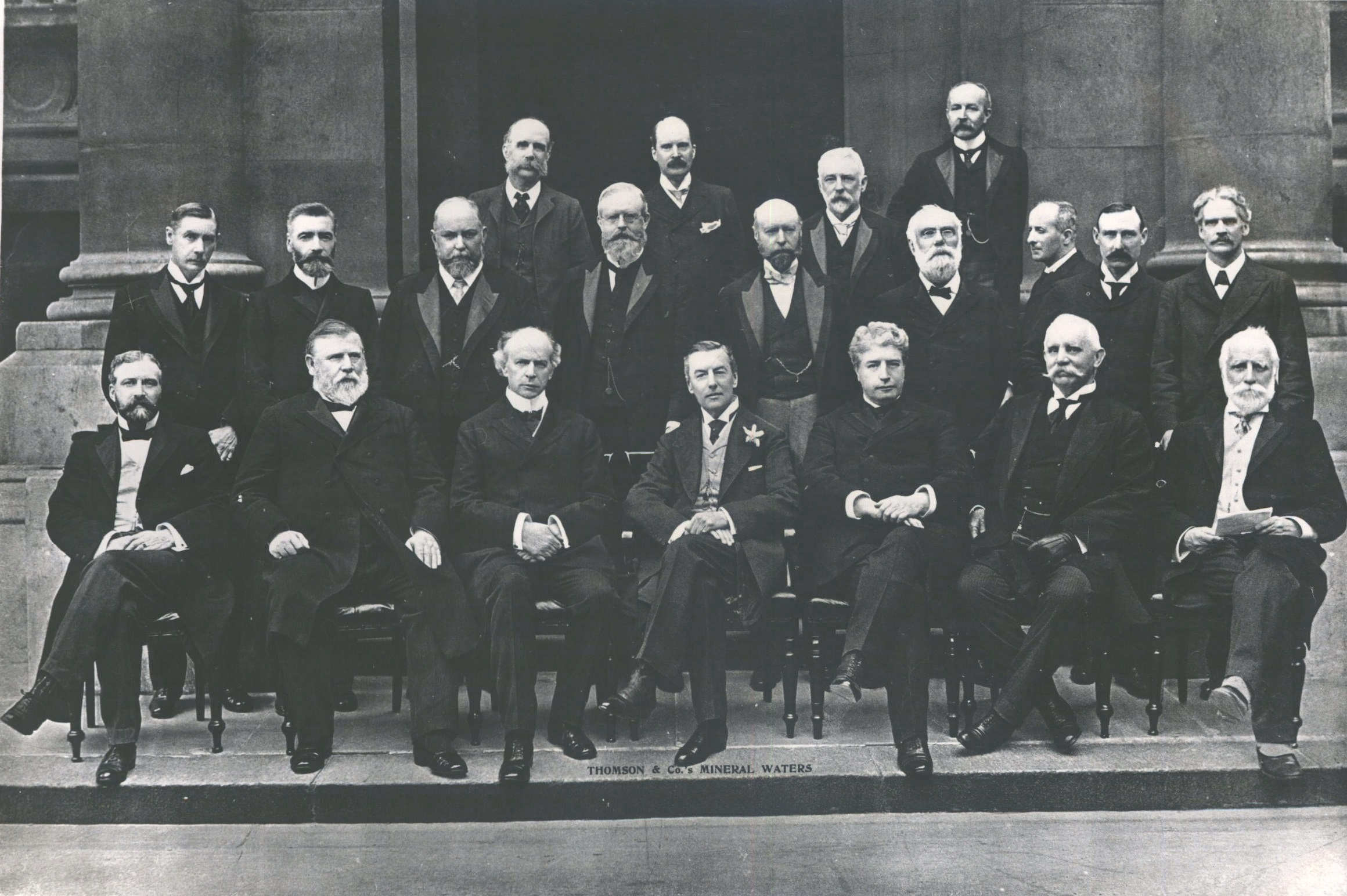
Laurier (seated third from the left) at the 1902 Colonial Conference

==== United Kingdom ====
On June 22, 1897, Laurier attended the Diamond Jubilee of Queen Victoria, which was the 60th anniversary of her accession. There, he was knighted, and was given several honours, honorary degrees, and medals. Laurier again visited the United Kingdom in 1902, taking part in the 1902 Colonial Conference and the coronation of King Edward VII on August 9, 1902. Laurier also took part in the 1907 and 1911 Imperial Conferences.

In 1899, the British government requested Canadian troops to serve in the Second Boer War. Laurier was caught between demands for support for military action from English Canada and a strong opposition from French Canada. Laurier eventually decided to send a volunteer force, rather than the Canadian Militia as expected by Britain. Roughly 7,000 Canadian soldiers served in the force. Outspoken French Canadian nationalist and Liberal MP Henri Bourassa was an especially vocal opponent of any form of Canadian participation in the Boer War and thus resigned from the Liberal caucus in October 1899.

On June 1, 1909, Laurier's government established the Department of External Affairs for Canada to take greater control of its foreign policy.

The Anglo-German naval arms race escalated in the early years of the 20th century. The British government requested financial and material resources to assist in expanding the Royal Navy, precipitating a heated political division in Canada. Many English Canadians wished to send as much as possible; many French Canadians and those against wished to send nothing. Aiming for compromise, Laurier advanced the Naval Service Act of 1910 which created the Royal Canadian Navy. The navy would initially consist of five cruisers and six destroyers; in times of crisis, it could be made subordinate to the British navy. However, the idea faced opposition in both English and French Canada, especially in Quebec where Bourassa organized an anti-Laurier force.

==== Alaska boundary dispute ====
In 1897 and 1898, the Alaska-Canada border emerged as a pressing issue. The Klondike Gold Rush prompted Laurier to demand an all-Canadian route from the gold fields to a seaport. The region being a desirable place with lots of gold furthered Laurier's ambition of fixing an exact boundary. Laurier also wanted to establish who owned the Lynn Canal and who controlled maritime access to the Yukon. Laurier and US President William McKinley agreed to set up a joint Anglo-American commission that would study the differences and resolve the dispute. However, this commission was unsuccessful and came to an abrupt end on February 20, 1899.

The dispute was then referred to an international judicial commission in 1903, which included three American politicians (Elihu Root, Henry Cabot Lodge, and George Turner), two Canadians (Allen Bristol Aylesworth and Louis-Amable Jetté) and one Briton (Lord Alverstone, Lord Chief Justice of England). On October 20, 1903, the commission by a majority (Root, Lodge, Turner, and Alverstone) ruled to support the American government's claims. Canada only acquired two islands below the Portland Canal. The decision provoked a wave of anti-American and anti-British sentiment in Canada, which Laurier temporarily encouraged.

==== Tariffs and trade ====
Though supportive of free trade with the United States, Laurier did not pursue the idea because the American government refused to discuss the issue. Instead, he implemented a Liberal version of the Conservatives' nationalist and protectionist National Policy by maintaining high tariffs on goods from other countries that restricted Canadian goods. However, he lowered tariffs to the same level as countries that admitted Canadian goods.

In 1897, Laurier's government impelemented a preferential reduction of a tariff rate of 12.5 percent for countries that imported Canadian goods at a rate equivalent to the minimum Canadian charge; rates for countries that imposed a protective duty against Canada remained the same. For the most part, the policy was supported by those for free trade (due to the preferential reduction) and those against free trade (due to elements of the National Policy remaining in place).

Laurier's government again reformed tariffs in 1907. His government introduced a "three-column tariff", which added a new intermediate rate (a bargaining rate) alongside the existing British preferential rate and the general rate (which applied to all countries that Canada had no most-favoured-nation agreement with). The preferential and general rates remained unchanged, while the intermediate rates were slightly lower than the general rates.

Also in 1907, Laurier's minister of finance, William Stevens Fielding, and minister of marine and fisheries, Louis-Philippe Brodeur, negotiated a trade agreement with France which lowered import duties on some goods. In 1909, Fielding negotiated an agreement to promote trade with the British West Indies.

=== Election victories ===
Laurier led the Liberal party to three re-elections in 1900, 1904, and 1908. In the 1900 and 1904 elections, the Liberals' popular vote and seat share increased whereas in the 1908 election, the party's popular vote and seat share went down slightly.

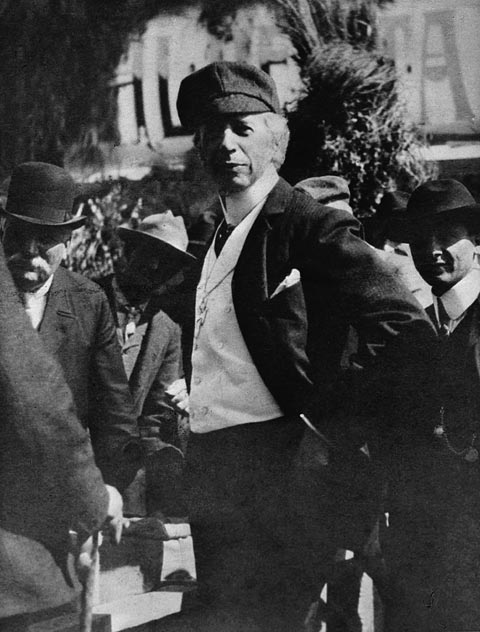
Laurier, towards the end of his tenure

==== Quebec stronghold ====
By the late 1800s, Laurier built up Quebec as a base for the Liberal Party. Quebec had been a Conservative stronghold for decades due to the province's social conservatism and to the influence of the Roman Catholic Church, which distrusted the Liberals' anti-clericalism. The growing alienation of French Canadians from the Conservative Party due to its links with anti-French, anti-Catholic Orangemen in English Canada aided the Liberal Party. After the collapse of the Conservative Party of Quebec, Laurier built a stronghold in French Canada and among Catholics across Canada.

However, Catholic priests in Quebec repeatedly warned their parishioners not to vote for Liberals. Their slogan was "le ciel est bleu, l'enfer est rouge" ("heaven is blue, hell is red", referring to the Conservative and Liberal parties' traditional colours).

=== Reciprocity and defeat ===
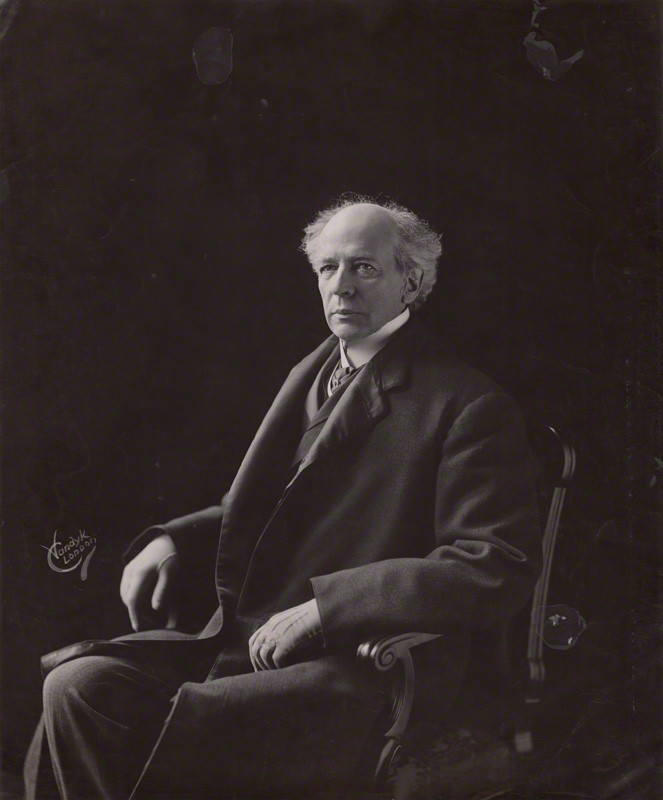
Laurier at the end of his premiership in 1911.

In 1911, controversy arose regarding Laurier's support of trade reciprocity with the United States. His long-serving minister of finance, William Stevens Fielding, reached an agreement allowing for the free trade of natural products. The agreement would also lower tariffs. This had the strong support of agricultural interests, particularly in Western Canada, but it alienated many businessmen who formed a significant part of the Liberal base, many whom shifted their support to the Conservatives. Official Opposition leader Robert Laird Borden and the Conservatives denounced the deal and played on long-standing fears that reciprocity could eventually lead to weakened ties with Britain and a Canadian economy dominated by the United States. They also campaigned on fears that this would lead to the Canadian identity being taken away by the US and the American annexation of Canada.

Laurier's government was unable to pass the reciprocity agreement due to an unruly caucus within the House of Commons, led by vocal disapproval from Liberal MP Clifford Sifton. Laurier called an election to settle the issue of reciprocity. The Conservatives were victorious and the Liberals lost over a third of their seats. The Conservatives' leader, Borden, succeeded Laurier as prime minister. Over 15 consecutive years of Liberal rule ended.

== Opposition and war (1911–1919) ==
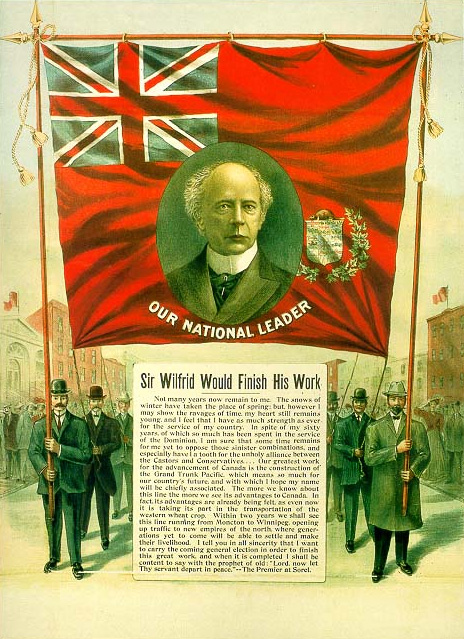
Election flyer for Wilfrid Laurier and the Liberal Party in the 1908 federal election

Laurier stayed on as Liberal leader. In December 1912, he started leading the filibuster and fight against the Conservatives' Naval Aid Bill, which would have allocated $35 million to be sent to assist the Royal Navy. The Conservative plan was at least three times more costly than the Liberal plan to construct a Canadian-operated fleet, and would reap no benefits to Canadian industries whatsoever. Laurier argued that the bill threatened Canada's autonomy, and after six months of battling it, the bill was blocked by the Liberal-controlled Senate.

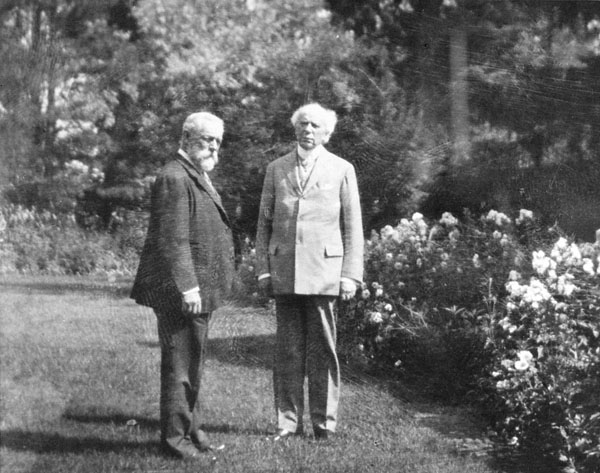
Laurier as Opposition Leader in 1915

Laurier led the opposition during World War I. He supported sending a volunteer force to fight in the war, arguing that an intense campaign for volunteers would produce enough troops. Borden initially had a volunteer military system in place, but when applications started to decline, he imposed conscription in the summer of 1917, which led to the Conscription Crisis of 1917. Laurier was an influential opponent of conscription, and his position on the matter was applauded by French Canadians, who were generally anti-conscription. Pro-conscription Liberals, particularly from English Canada, joined Borden as Liberal-Unionists to form the Union government. Laurier refused to join the Unionist Party, and instead created the "Laurier Liberals", a party composed of Liberals opposed to conscription. Laurier also rejected Prime Minister Borden's proposal to form a coalition government composed of both Conservatives and Liberals, arguing that there would be no "real" opposition to the government. He also argued that if the Liberals joined, Quebec would feel alienated and would lead to the province being heavily influenced by outspoken French-Canadian nationalist Henri Bourassa, and what Laurier called Bourassa's "dangerous nationalism" which might lead to Quebec seceding from Canada. In addition, Laurier raised concerns that the disenfranchisement of naturalized Canadians, such as Ukrainian Canadians, by the Wartime Elections Act would establish a bad precedent because it could deterred immigrants from coming to Canada knowing that they could be disposed by the government.

In the 1917 election, the Laurier Liberals were reduced to a mostly French Canadian rump. Laurier swept Quebec, winning 62 out of 65 of the province's seats, not least due to the French Canadians' overwhelming respect and support for Laurier as a result of his opposition to conscription.

The Conscription Crisis once again revealed the divisions between French Canadians and English Canadians. Most English Canadians favoured conscription as they believed this would strengthen ties with Britain, whereas most French Canadians opposed conscription as they wanted nothing to do with the war. Laurier was now seen as a "traitor" to English Canadians and English Canadian Liberals, whereas he was seen as a "hero" for French Canadians. Laurier's protégé and successor as party leader, William Lyon Mackenzie King, unified the English and French factions of the Liberal Party, leading it to victory over the Conservatives in the 1921 federal election.

After the election, Laurier still stayed on as Liberal and Opposition leader. When World War I came to an end on November 11, 1918, he focused on his efforts to rebuild and reunify the Liberal Party.

== Death ==
Laurier's state funeral

Laurier died of a stroke on February 17, 1919, while still in office as leader of the Opposition. Though he had lost a bitter election two years earlier, he was loved nationwide for his "warm smile, his sense of style, and his "sunny ways"." 50,000 to 100,000 people jammed the streets of Ottawa as his funeral procession marched to his final resting place at Notre-Dame Cemetery. His remains were eventually placed in a stone sarcophagus, adorned by sculptures of nine mourning female figures, representing each of the provinces in the union. His wife, Zoé Laurier, died on November 1, 1921, and was placed in the same tomb.

Laurier was permanently succeeded as Liberal leader by his former minister of labour, William Lyon Mackenzie King. King narrowly defeated Laurier's former minister of finance, William Stevens Fielding. According to Zoé, Fielding was Laurier's choice for next leader; Laurier believed Fielding had the best chance to restore unity in the party.

== Personal life ==
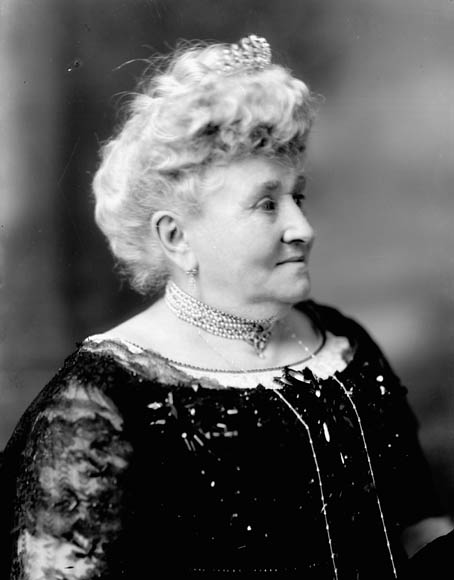
Lady Zoë Laurier in 1911.

Wilfrid Laurier married Zoé Lafontaine in Montreal at Saint-Jacques Cathedral on May 13, 1868. She was the daughter of G.N.R. Lafontaine and his first wife, Zoé Tessier known as Zoé Lavigne. Laurier's wife Zoé was born in Montreal and educated there at the School of the Bon Pasteur, and at the Convent of the Sisters of the Sacred Heart, St. Vincent de Paul. The couple lived at Arthabaskaville until they moved to Ottawa in 1896. She was one of the vice presidents on the formation of the National Council of Women and was honorary vice president of the Victorian Order of Nurses. The couple had no children.

Beginning in 1878 and for some twenty years while married to Zoé, Laurier had an "ambiguous relationship" with a married woman, Émilie Barthe. Zoé was not an intellectual; Émilie was, and relished literature and politics like Wilfrid, whose heart she won. Rumour had it he fathered a son, Armand Lavergne, with her, yet Zoé remained with him until his death.

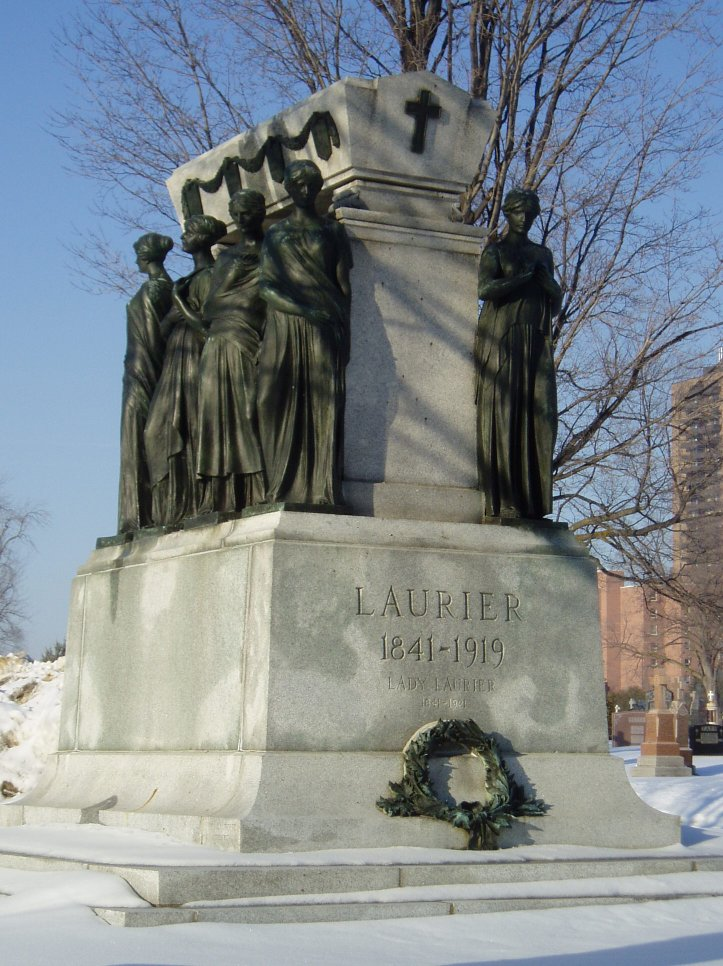
Laurier's elaborate tomb near the front gates of Ottawa's Notre-Dame Cemetery (Ottawa).

== Legacy ==
Overall, Laurier's efforts to remain neutral between English Canadians and French Canadians, and his efforts to seek a middle ground between the two ethnic groups have paved the way for him to be ranked among the top three of Canadian prime ministers. Despite being a French Canadian, he did not fully accept the French Canadian demands of repealing Manitoba's ban on public funding for Catholic schools nor did he fully accept their demands of refusing to send any Canadian troop to fight in the Boer War. Nonetheless, in all seven elections he fought, the majority of Quebec's ridings were handed over to his Liberal Party. Despite one notable exception in 1958, the Liberal Party continued to dominate federal politics in Quebec until 1984.

Historian Jacques Monet wrote, "To his faithful followers, especially in Quebec, where his surname is used as a first name by many other Canadians, Laurier is a charismatic hero whose term of office was a happy time in Canadian history. He worked all his life for cooperation between French- and English-speaking Canadians while he strove to keep Canada as independent as possible from Britain. His personal charm and dignity, his great skill as an orator, and his great gifts of intellect won the admiration of all Canadians and non-Canadians alike."

According to historians Norman Hillmer and Stephen Azzi, a 2011 poll of 117 historians and experts voted Laurier as the "best" Canadian prime minister, ahead of John A. Macdonald and Mackenzie King. Laurier was ranked Number 3 of the Prime Ministers of Canada (out of the 20 through Jean Chrétien) in the survey by Canadian historians included in Prime Ministers: Ranking Canada's Leaders by J.L. Granatstein and Norman Hillmer. "Passionate, charismatic, and an intellectual force in both languages," the Canadian War Museum's Tim Cook stated, "Sir Wilfrid was the full package."

More recently, Laurier has been criticised for his policies towards Indigenous Canadians, Chinese, and Indian immigrants. Laurier's government had promoted immigration for economic growth, but also took measures to prevent Chinese and Indian immigrants from arriving. Additionally, Laurier also encouraged settlements, which affected local populations.

== Recognition ==
=== National historic sites ===
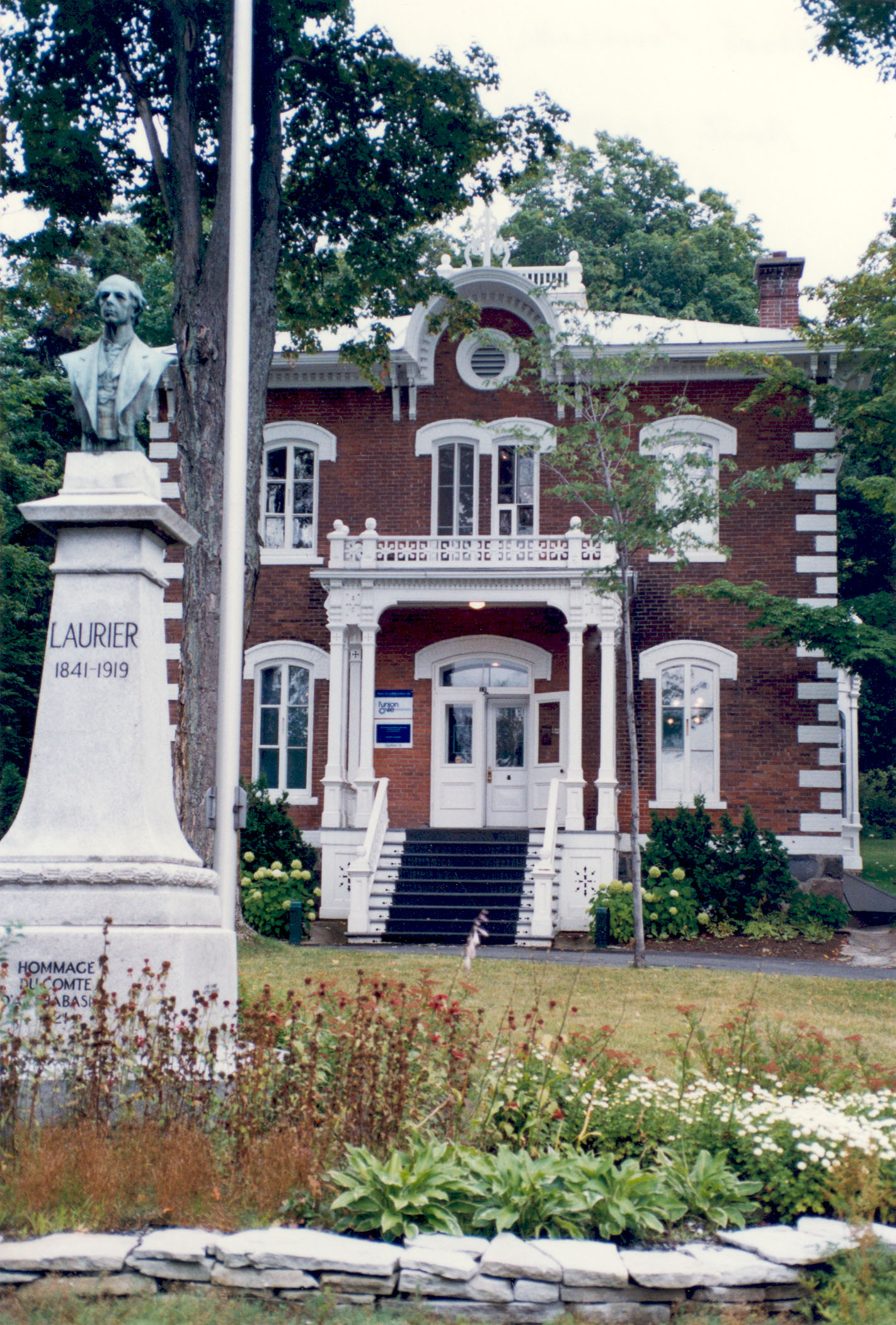
Laurier Museum, Victoriaville, QC

Laurier is commemorated by three National Historic Sites.

The Sir Wilfrid Laurier National Historic Site is in his birthplace, Saint-Lin-Laurentides, a town 60 km (37 mi) north of Montreal, Quebec. Its establishment reflected an early desire to not only mark his birthplace (a plaque in 1925 and a monument in 1927), but to create a shrine to Laurier in the 1930s. Despite early doubts and later confirmation that the house designated as the birthplace was neither Laurier's nor on its original site, its development, and the building of a museum, satisfied the goal of honoring the man and reflecting his early life.

Laurier's brick residence in Ottawa is known as Laurier House National Historic Site, at the corner of what is now Laurier Avenue and Chapel Street. In their will, the Lauriers left the house to Prime Minister Mackenzie King, who in turn donated it to Canada upon his death. Both sites are administered by Parks Canada as part of the national park system.

The 1876 Italianate residence of the Lauriers during his years as a lawyer and Member of Parliament, in Victoriaville, Quebec, is designated Wilfrid Laurier House National Historic Site, owned privately and operated as the Laurier Museum.

In November 2011, Wilfrid Laurier University in Waterloo, Ontario, unveiled a statue depicting a young Wilfrid Laurier sitting on a bench, thinking.

=== Other honours ===
Laurier had titular honours including:

- The prenominal "The Honourable" and the postnominal "PC" for life by virtue of being made a member of the Queen's Privy Council for Canada on October 8, 1877.
- His prenominal was upgraded to "The Right Honourable" when he was made a member of the Imperial Privy Council of the United Kingdom in the 1897 Diamond Jubilee Honours
- The prenominal "Sir" and postnominal "GCMG" as a knight grand cross of the Order of Saint Michael and Saint George, bestowed in the 1897 Diamond Jubilee Honours
- The honorary degree LL.D. from the University of Edinburgh and the Freedom of the City of Edinburgh on July 26, 1902, when he visited the city while in the country for the coronation of King Edward VII.
- Sir Wilfrid Laurier Day is observed each year on November 20, his birth date
- Laurier is depicted on several banknotes issued by the Bank of Canada:

The $1,000 note in the 1935 Series and 1937 Series
The $5 note in the Scenes of Canada series, 1972 and 1979, Birds of Canada series, 1986, Journey series, 2002 and Frontier series, 2013

- Laurier has appeared on at least three postage stamps, issued in 1927 (two) and 1973

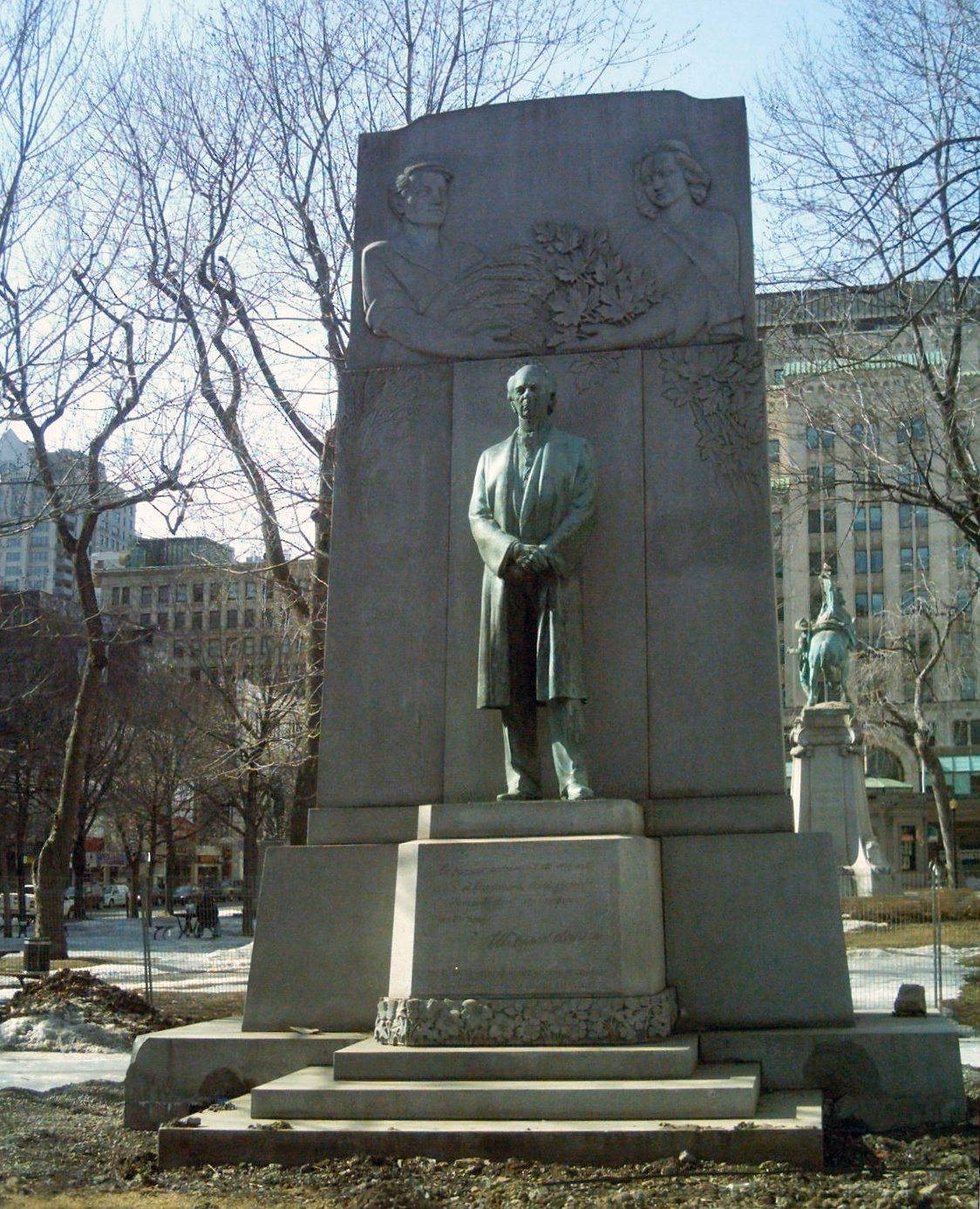
Joseph-Émile Brunet's Sir Wilfrid Laurier (1953) in Square Dorchester, Montreal

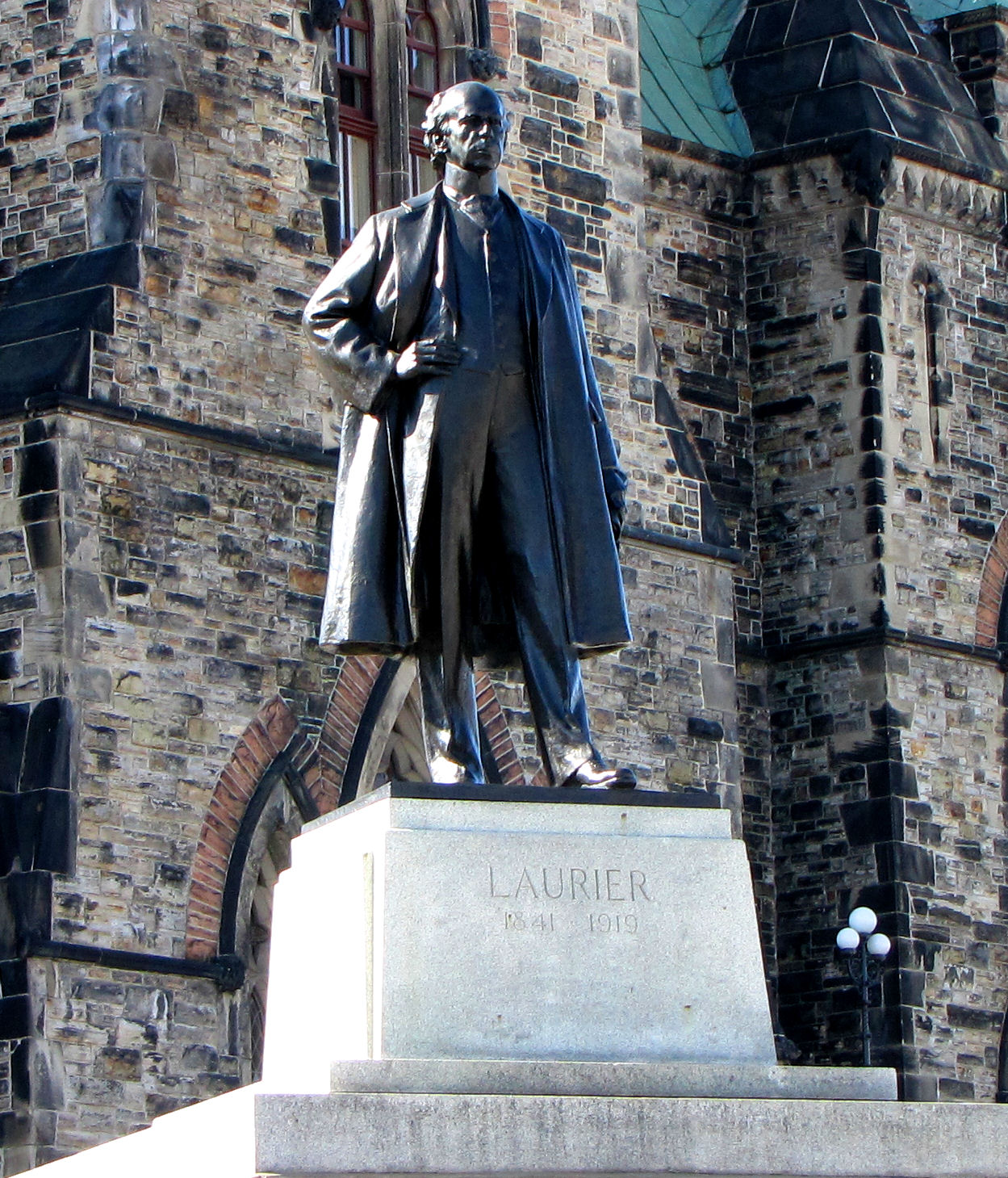
Joseph-Émile Brunet's statue of Wilfrid Laurier behind the East Block on Parliament Hill

Many sites and landmarks were named to honor Laurier. They include:

- Mount Sir Wilfrid Laurier, the highest peak in British Columbia's Premier Range, near Mount Robson
- Sir Wilfrid Laurier Elementary, in Vancouver, British Columbia
- Laurier Avenue, in Milton, Ontario
- Avenue Laurier, in Shawinigan, Quebec
- Mont-Laurier, Quebec
- Laurier Boulevard, and Laurier Hill, in Brockville, Ontario
- Avenue Laurier, in Montreal, Quebec
- Boulevard Laurier, in Quebec City, Quebec
- Laurier Avenue, in Ottawa, Ontario
- Laurier Avenue, in Deep River, Ontario
- Laurier Street, in North Bay, Ontario
- Rue Laurier, in Casselman, Ontario
- Rue Laurier Street, in Rockland, Ontario
- The Laurier Heights neighbourhood, including Laurier Drive and Laurier Heights School, in Edmonton, Alberta
- Laurier Drive, in Saskatoon's Confederation Park neighbourhood, where the majority of the streets are named after former Canadian prime ministers
- The provincial electoral district of Laurier-Dorion (an honour shared with Canadian politician Antoine-Aimé Dorion)
- The federal electoral district of Laurier—Sainte-Marie
- Wilfrid Laurier University (previously known as Waterloo Lutheran University), a publicly funded university in Waterloo, Ontario, with campuses in Brantford and Milton
- A Montreal Metro station, Laurier (Montreal Metro)
- CCGS Sir Wilfrid Laurier
- Château Laurier, a downtown Ottawa hotel of high reputation and a national historic site
- Sir Wilfrid Laurier Public School in Markham, Ontario
- Sir Wilfrid Laurier School Board, an English school board in Quebec; the school board serves the Laval, Laurentides, and Lanaudière regions in Quebec
- Sir Wilfrid Laurier Secondary School in London, Ontario
- Sir Wilfrid Laurier Secondary School in Ottawa, Ontario
- Sir Wilfrid Laurier Collegiate Institute in Scarborough, Ontario

== Supreme Court appointments ==
Wilfrid Laurier advised the Governor General to appoint the following individuals to the Supreme Court of Canada:

- Sir Louis Henry Davies (September 25, 1901 – May 1, 1924)
- David Mills (February 8, 1902 – May 8, 1903)
- Sir Henri Elzéar Taschereau (as Chief Justice November 21, 1902 – May 2, 1906; appointed a Puisne Justice under Prime Minister Mackenzie, October 7, 1878)
- John Douglas Armour (November 21, 1902 – July 11, 1903)
- Wallace Nesbitt (May 16, 1903 – October 4, 1905)
- Albert Clements Killam (August 8, 1903 – February 6, 1905)
- John Idington (February 10, 1905 – March 31, 1927)
- James Maclennan (October 5, 1905 – February 13, 1909)
- Sir Charles Fitzpatrick (as Chief Justice, June 4, 1906 – November 21, 1918)
- Sir Lyman Poore Duff (September 27, 1906 – January 2, 1944)
- Francis Alexander Anglin (February 23, 1909 – February 28, 1933)
- Louis-Philippe Brodeur (August 11, 1911 – October 10, 1923)

== Arms ==
Coat of arms of Wilfrid Laurier
Notes These arms are assumed, however, Laurier is entitled to bear arms by virtue of his appointment to the Order of St. Michael and St. George. They have been acknowledged by, but not registered with the Canadian Heraldic Authority. Crest Three maple leaves Vert tied Argent Helm A French gentleman's helmet Escutcheon Gules, a crown with two laurel branches Or tied Argent, on a chief Or three maple leaves Vert tied Argent, flanked by two fleurs-de-lis Azure Motto MON NOM EST MA COURONNE (French for 'My name is my crown') Orders Order of St. Michael and St. George: Auspicium Melioris Ævi (Latin for 'Token of a Better Age') Legion of Honour: Honneur et patrie (French for 'Honour and Fatherland')

== In popular culture ==
- Wilfrid Laurier appears as the leader of the Canadian civilization in the 4X video game Sid Meier's Civilization VI.

== See also ==
- List of prime ministers of Canada
- 8th Canadian Ministry
- 1896 Canadian federal election
- 1900 Canadian federal election
- 1904 Canadian federal election
- 1908 Canadian federal election
- 1911 Canadian federal election
- List of Canadian federal general elections

== Notes ==
Political offices
Preceded by Joseph-Édouard Cauchon	Minister of Inland Revenue; 1877–1878	Succeeded by Louis François Georges Baby
Preceded by Edward Blake	Leader of the Opposition; 1887–1896	Succeeded by Sir Charles Tupper
Preceded by Sir Charles Tupper	Prime Minister of Canada; 1896–1911	Succeeded by Robert Borden
Preceded by Auguste-Réal Angers	President of the Privy Council; 1896–1911	Succeeded by Robert Laird Borden
Preceded by Clifford Sifton	Superintendent-General of Indian Affairs; 1905	Succeeded by Frank Oliver
Preceded by Clifford Sifton	Minister of the Interior; 1905	Succeeded by Frank Oliver
Preceded by Joseph Raymond Fournier Préfontaine	Minister of Marine and Fisheries; 1906	Succeeded by Louis-Philippe Brodeur
Preceded by Robert Borden	Leader of the Opposition; 1911–1919	Succeeded by Daniel McKenzie
Party political offices
Preceded by Edward Blake	Leader of the Liberal Party of Canada; 1887–1919	Succeeded by Daniel McKenzie; Interim
Parliament of Canada
Preceded by Pierre-Nérée Dorion	Member of Parliament for Drummond—Arthabaska; 1874–1877	Succeeded by Désiré-Olivier Bourbeau
Preceded by Isidore Thibaudeau	Member of Parliament for Quebec East; 1877–1919	Succeeded by Ernest Lapointe
Preceded by Day Hort MacDowall	Member of Parliament for Saskatchewan (Provisional District); 1896	Succeeded by Thomas Osborne Davis
Preceded by Louis Napoléon Champagne	Member of Parliament for Wright; 1904	Succeeded by Emmanuel Devlin
Preceded by Jean-Baptiste Thomas Caron	Member of Parliament for Ottawa; 1908–1910; With: Harold B. McGiverin	Succeeded by Albert Allard
Preceded by Joseph-Arthur Lortie	Member of Parliament for Soulanges; 1911–1917	District abolished
