= Rivière-du-Nord (electoral district) =

Federal electoral district in Quebec, Canada

Coordinates: 45.852°N 73.975°W

Quebec electoral district
- Interactive map of riding boundaries from the 2025 federal election

Federal electoral district
- Legislature: House of Commons
MP
Rhéal Fortin
Bloc Québécois
- District created: 2003
- First contested: 2004
- Last contested: 2021
- District webpage: profile, map

Demographics
- Population (2019): 112,156
- Electors (2019): 95,813
- Area (km²): 381
- Pop. density (per km²): 294.4
- Census division: La Rivière-du-Nord
- Census subdivision(s): Saint-Jérôme, Sainte-Sophie, Sainte-Anne-des-Plaines

Rivière-du-Nord (French pronunciation: [ʁivjɛʁ dy nɔʁ]) is a federal electoral district in Quebec, Canada, that has been represented in the House of Commons of Canada since 2004.

== Geography ==
The district consists of the La Rivière-du-Nord Regional County Municipality. It includes the communities of Saint-Jérôme, Sainte-Sophie, Prévost, Saint-Hippolyte and Saint-Colomban

The neighbouring ridings are Les Pays-d'en-Haut, Montcalm, Terrebonne, Thérèse-De Blainville and Mirabel.

== Demographics ==
According to the 2021 Canadian census

Ethnic groups: 93.5% White, 2.3% Black, 1.8% Indigenous

Languages: 92.9% French, 1.9% English, 1.1% Spanish

Religions: 64.5% Christian (57.9% Catholic, 6.6% Other), 1.3% Muslim, 33.6% none

Median income: $40,000 (2020)

Average income: $47,200 (2020)

== History ==
The electoral district was created in 2003: 83.3% of the population of the riding came from Laurentides, 9.3% from Berthier—Montcalm and 7.4% from Argenteuil—Papineau—Mirabel ridings. In the 2012 electoral redistribution, the riding lost Saint-Colomban to Mirabel.

Following the 2022 Canadian federal electoral redistribution, the riding gained Sainte-Anne-des-Plaines from Mirabel and lost the municipalities of Prévost and Saint-Hippolyte to Les Pays-d'en-Haut.

=== Member of Parliament ===
This riding has elected the following members of Parliament:

Parliament	Years	Member	Party
Rivière-du-Nord; Riding created from Laurentides, Berthier—Montcalm and Argenteuil—Papineau—Mirabel
38th	2004–2006	Monique Guay	Bloc Québécois
39th	2006–2008	Monique Guay	Bloc Québécois
40th	2008–2011	Monique Guay	Bloc Québécois
41st	2011–2015	Pierre Dionne Labelle	New Democratic
42nd	2015–2018	Rhéal Fortin	Bloc Québécois
42nd	2018–2018	Rhéal Fortin	Groupe parlementaire québécois
42nd	2018–2019	Rhéal Fortin	Bloc Québécois
43rd	2019–2021	Rhéal Fortin	Bloc Québécois
44th	2021–2025	Rhéal Fortin	Bloc Québécois
45th	2025–present	Rhéal Fortin	Bloc Québécois

== Election results ==
Graph of election results in Rivière-du-Nord (minor parties that never got 2% of the vote or didn't run consistently are omitted) View source data.

2025 Canadian federal election
Party	Candidate	Votes	%	±%	Expenditures
Bloc Québécois	Rhéal Fortin	25,438	43.85	−7.75	$22,420.66
Liberal	Mary-Helen Walton	18,345	31.62	+9.15	$3,070.24
Conservative	Patricia Morrissette	12,203	21.03	+8.99	$5,071.29
New Democratic	Christel Marchand	2,032	3.50	−3.38	$0.00
Total valid votes/expense limit		58,018	97.73	–	$139,338.04
Total rejected ballots		1,349	2.27		
Turnout		59,367	63.42		
Eligible voters		93,608			
Bloc Québécois notional hold		Swing		−8.45	
Source: Elections Canada
Note: number of eligible voters does not include voting day registrations.

2021 federal election redistributed results
Party	Vote	%
Bloc Québécois	26,505	51.60
Liberal	11,542	22.47
Conservative	6,183	12.04
New Democratic	3,536	6.88
People's	1,967	3.83
Green	149	0.29
Others	1,482	2.89

2021 Canadian federal election
Party	Candidate	Votes	%	±%	Expenditures
Bloc Québécois	Rhéal Fortin	29,943	52.2	+0.2	$17,137.18
Liberal	Theodora Bajkin	12,767	22.3	±0.0	$5,481.12
Conservative	Patricia Morrissette	6,803	11.9	+0.1	$17,935.40
New Democratic	Marie-Helen Paspaliaris	3,958	6.9	-0.1	$703.54
People's	Keeyan Ravanshid	2,164	3.8	+3.1	$1,391.38
Free	Marie-Eve Damour	1,036	1.8	N/A	$733.88
Rhinoceros	Jean-François René	373	0.7	N/A	$0.00
Indépendance du Québec	Nicolas Riqueur-Lainé	285	0.5	+0.1	$0.00
Total valid votes/expense limit		57,329	97.7	–	$126,251.14
Total rejected ballots		1,327	2.3		
Turnout		58,656	59.1		
Eligible voters		99,292			
Bloc Québécois hold		Swing		+0.1	
Source: Elections Canada

2019 Canadian federal election
Party	Candidate	Votes	%	±%	Expenditures
Bloc Québécois	Rhéal Fortin	31,281	52.0	+20.0	$14,299.86
Liberal	Florence Gagnon	13,402	22.3	-4.1	$53,916.68
Conservative	Sylvie Fréchette	7,120	11.8	+3.3	$28,363.50
New Democratic	Myriam Ouellette	4,194	7.0	-23.1	none listed
Green	Joey Leckman	3,345	5.6	+3.1	$7,366.15
People's	Normand Michaud	407	0.7	–	$45.01
Indépendance du Québec	Nicolas Riqueur-Lainé	225	0.4	–	$117.25
Independent	Lucie St-Gelais	127	0.2	–	$0.00
Total valid votes/expense limit		60,101	100.0		
Total rejected ballots		1,206			
Turnout		61,307	64.0		
Eligible voters		95,813			
Bloc Québécois hold		Swing		+12.05	
Source: Elections Canada

2015 Canadian federal election
Party	Candidate	Votes	%	±%	Expenditures
Bloc Québécois	Rhéal Fortin	18,157	32.05	+3.85	$29,318.93
New Democratic	Pierre Dionne Labelle	17,077	30.14	-24.98	$42,630.13
Liberal	Janice Bélair Rolland	14,933	26.36	+19.91	$11,873.97
Conservative	Romain Vignol	4,793	8.46	+0.03	$3,414.56
Green	Joey Leckman	1,436	2.53	+0.74	$4,357.78
Rhinoceros	Fobozof A. Côté	261	0.46	–	$501.24
Total valid votes/expense limit		56,657	100.0		$230,280.85
Total rejected ballots		1,044	–	–	
Turnout		57,701	65.13	–	
Eligible voters		88,586			
Bloc Québécois gain from New Democratic		Swing		+14.42	
Source: Elections Canada

2011 federal election redistributed results
Party	Vote	%
New Democratic	26,290	55.12
Bloc Québécois	13,449	28.20
Conservative	4,022	8.43
Liberal	3,078	6.45
Green	856	1.79

2011 Canadian federal election
Party	Candidate	Votes	%	±%	Expenditures
New Democratic	Pierre Dionne Labelle	29,603	55.3	+40.6	
Bloc Québécois	Monique Guay	15,105	28.2	-25.4	
Conservative	Sylvain Charron	4,469	8.3	-6.1	
Liberal	Jonathan Juteau	3,400	6.3	-7.3	
Green	René Piché	972	1.8	-1.5	
Total valid votes/expense limit		53,549	100.0		
Total rejected ballots		880	1.6	–	
Turnout		54,429	60.2	–	
Eligible voters		90,398	–	–	

2008 Canadian federal election
Party	Candidate	Votes	%	±%	Expenditures
Bloc Québécois	Monique Guay	26,588	53.6	-5.5	$30,431
New Democratic	Simon Bernier	7,187	14.5	+7.3	$1,889
Conservative	Gilles Duguay	7,170	14.4	-6.3	$21,051
Liberal	Joao Neves	6,755	13.6	+4.3	$2,401
Green	René Piché	1,656	3.3	-0.3	
Independent	Jocelyne Leduc	273	0.6		$165
Total valid votes/expense limit		49,629	100.0	$88,578	
Total rejected ballots		851	1.0		
Electors on lists		85,179			
Turnout			59,26		

2006 Canadian federal election
Party	Candidate	Votes	%	±%	Expenditures
Bloc Québécois	Monique Guay	27,789	59.1	-7.3	$48,755
Conservative	Pierre Albert	9,769	20.8	+15.2	$6,473
Liberal	Yannick Guénette	4,365	9.3	-12.3	$7,837
New Democratic	Simon Bernier	3,393	7.2	+4.3	$1,863
Green	Maude Genet	1,722	3.7	+1.1	
Total valid votes/expense limit		47,038	100.0	$79,573	

2004 Canadian federal election
Party	Candidate	Votes	%	±%	Expenditures
Bloc Québécois	Monique Guay	29,204	66.3	–	$60,052
Liberal	Lorraine Auclair	9,509	21.6	–	$55,195
Conservative	Catherine Brousseau	2,435	5.5	–	$4,362
New Democratic	François Côté	1,290	2.9	–	
Green	Marcel Poirier	1,129	2.6	–	
Marijuana	Christian Marcoux	459	1.0	–	
Total valid votes/expense limit		44,026	100.0	$76,106	

== See also ==
- List of Canadian electoral districts
- Historical federal electoral districts of Canada
