= Saint-Hippolyte, Quebec =

Saint-Hippolyte
- Municipality
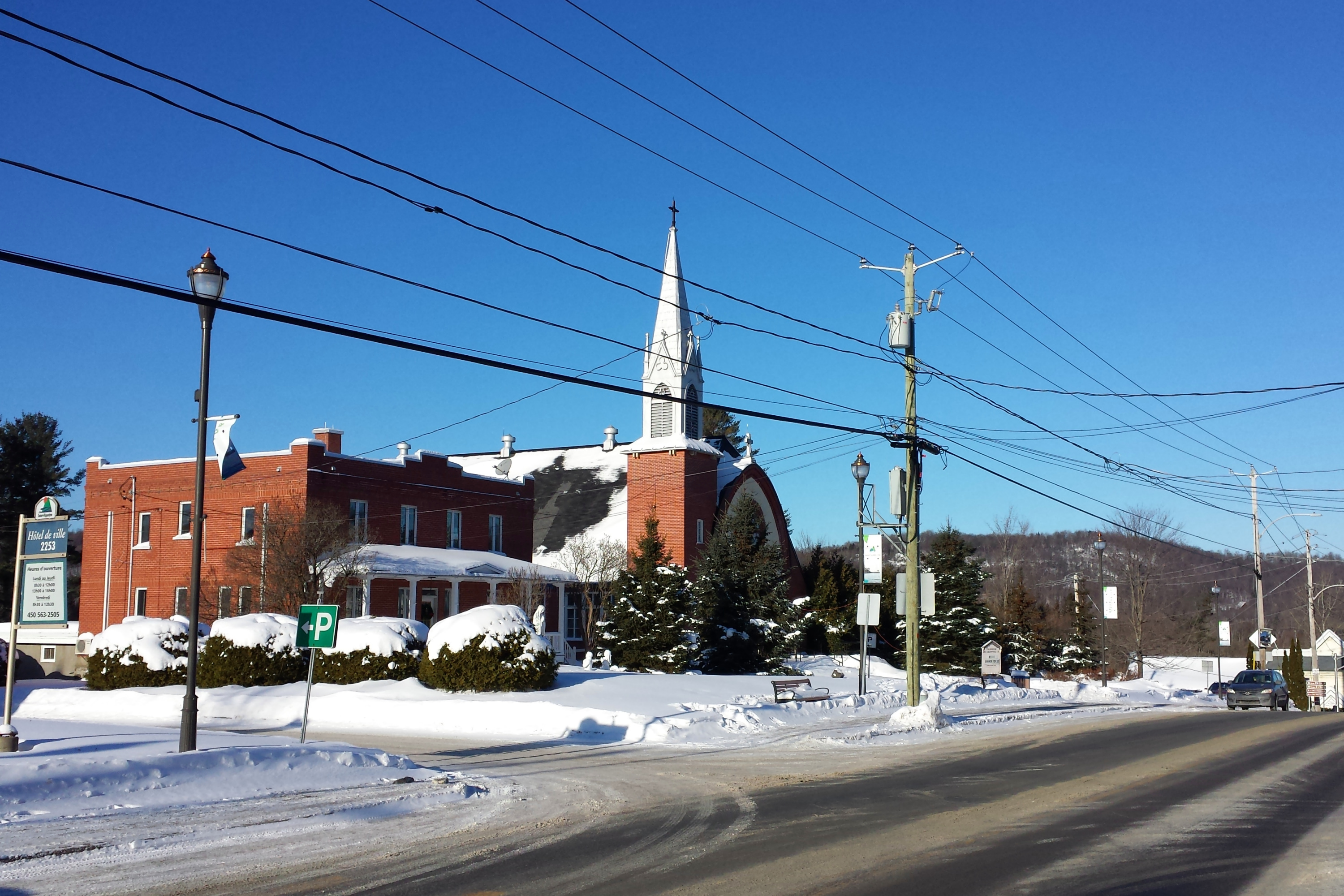
- Saint-Hippolyte Church, located on the town's main street, Chemin des Hauteurs
- Motto: Belle naturelle
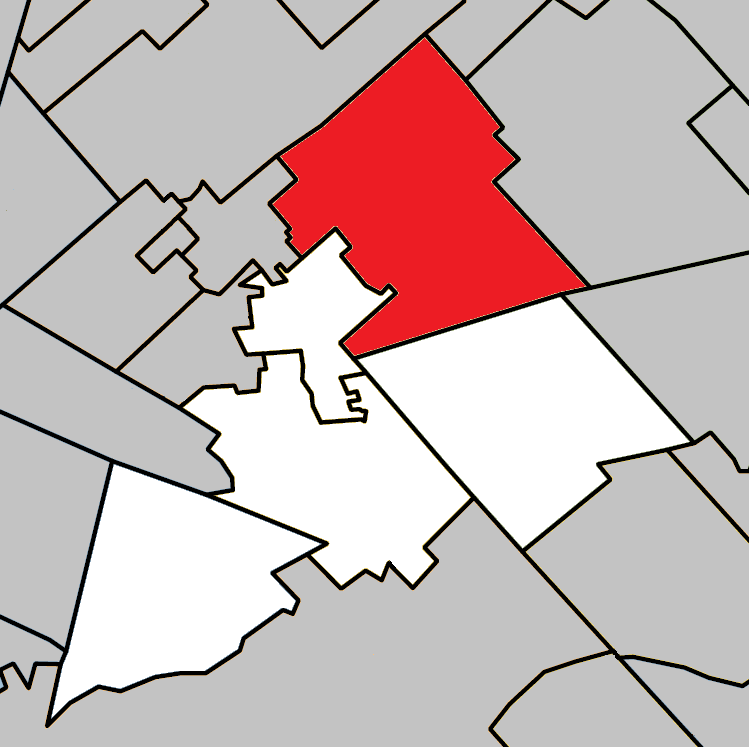
- Location within La Rivière-du-Nord RCM

- Location in central Quebec
- Coordinates: 45°56′N 74°01′W
- Country: Canada
- Province: Quebec
- Region: Laurentides
- RCM: La Rivière-du-Nord
- Constituted: July 1, 1855

Government
  - Mayor: Isabelle Poulin
  - Federal riding: Les Pays-d'en-Haut
  - Prov. riding: Prévost

Area
  - Municipality: 132.60 km^{2} (51.20 sq mi)
  - Land: 119.50 km^{2} (46.14 sq mi)
  - Urban: 2.16 km^{2} (0.83 sq mi)

Population (2021)
  - Municipality: 10,669
  - Density: 89.3/km^{2} (231/sq mi)
  - Urban: 1,272
  - Urban density: 590.2/km^{2} (1,529/sq mi)
  - Pop 2016-2021: ▲17.1%
- Time zone: UTC−5 (EST)
  - Summer (DST): UTC−4 (EDT)
- Postal code(s): J8A 1A1
- Area codes: 450 and 579
- Highways: R-333
- Website: saint-hippolyte.ca

Saint-Hippolyte (French pronunciation: [sɛ̃t‿ipɔlit]; historically Abercrombie)is a municipality within La Rivière-du-Nord Regional County Municipality in the Laurentides region of Quebec, Canada, in the Laurentian Mountains about 45 km north of Montreal. The name comes from Saint Hippolytus.

Part of the town was formerly known as Abercrombie-Est.

Police services are provided by the Régie intermunicipale de police de la Rivière-du-Nord, which also serves Piedmont, Prévost and some other communities in the Laurentians.

The municipality of Saint-Hippolyte's original name was Abercrombie. The name was pick to honor James Abercrombie, british commander-in-chief of forces in North America during the French and Indian War, best known for the disastrous British losses in the 1758 Battle of Carillon. The municipality changed its name to the current Saint-Hippolyte in 1951. The name was chosen to honor Hippolyte Moreau, titular canon of the Cathedral of Montreal (1854-1880) and vicar general (1873-1880). It was his responsibility to choose the location of the church in the name of Monsignor Ignace Bourget in 1864. The name is a reference to Hippolytus of Rome, one of the most important second-third century Christian theologians.

== History ==
The territory of present-day Saint-Hippolyte covers 133 km² and spans three townships: Kilkenny, opened to settlement in 1832; Abercrombie, proclaimed in 1842; and Wexford, created in 1852. Saint-Hippolyte was created in 1855 under the name of Abercrombie. The first settlers arrived in the 1820s, mainly Scots from New Glasgow, followed in the 1840s by Irish immigrants and, in the 1850s, French Canadians. A Catholic mission dedicated to Saint Hippolytus was established in 1864, with a chapel built in 1866–67. The parish was canonically erected in 1869 and gained civil status in 1870. A larger church was completed in 1877, replacing the chapel; it was destroyed by fire in 1933 and rebuilt the same year, featuring stained-glass windows by John Patrick O’Shea. By the mid-19th century, settlers operated a flour mill, but poor soils led to a focus on forestry, fishing, hunting, and later tourism. The arrival of the railway in nearby Shawbridge in 1891 boosted accessibility. From the late 19th century, the area attracted summer visitors and children’s camps, including the well-known Camp Bruchési (1927). Skiing and winter sports flourished between the 1920s and 1950s, with seasonal populations reaching about 20,000 in summer.

In 1951, the name of the municipality was changed to become Saint-Hippolyte, modernizing infrastructure, paving roads, and establishing fire and police services. Postwar years saw the gradual conversion of summer cottages into permanent residences, aided by the construction of Autoroute des Laurentides in the late 1950s. Agriculture had largely disappeared by the 1960s, leaving tourism as the main economic driver, with attractions such as Mont-Tyrol ski resort (1955–1981). The municipality celebrated its religious centennial in 1969, which led to the creation of local organizations such as the Cercle de fermières. From the 1970s onward, improved road access, municipal services, and recreational facilities encouraged population growth, with many young families settling for the natural environment and quality of life. Community infrastructure expanded with the Bivouac (Pavillon Roger-Cabana), a municipal library (1977), environmental protection programs, and numerous recreational associations.

The municipality’s history is closely tied to the development of education in the region. Small rural schools operated in various sectors from the 1870s onward, with children of all ages taught in single-room settings. In 1956, the Notre-Dame du Rosaire School centralized primary education, followed by the Christ-Roi School in 1962. By the 1980s, these facilities were expanded into the Centre éducatif et communautaire, which continues to serve local students despite recurring space shortages.

Tourism remained a defining aspect of the local economy throughout the 20th century. The growth of summer camps, lakeside cottages, and ski facilities helped transform Saint-Hippolyte into a seasonal destination. While the closure of Mont-Tyrol in 1981 reduced winter tourism, lakeside residential development continued to stimulate local commerce. The municipality also hosted popular community events such as the Montagne-Art festival, launched in 1986, which contributed to its cultural identity.

From the 1980s to the early 2000s, municipal administrations undertook significant infrastructure improvements, including the establishment of a municipal water system, septic system upgrades, and street lighting acquisition. Residential development surged, with hundreds of new homes built and new environmental measures implemented to protect local waterways and forests. Planning priorities began to incorporate not only housing and industry but also parks, green spaces, and heritage preservation.

By the early 21st century, Saint-Hippolyte had diversified its planning to include housing, industry, parks, and heritage preservation, adopting the slogan “Il fait bon vivre et travailler à Saint-Hippolyte!” The municipality’s population now exceeds 9,300 residents, maintaining its appeal as both a residential community and a nature-oriented destination. In 2009, the status of the municipality was changed from a parish municipality to a regular municipality.

== Geography ==
=== Climate ===
St Hippolyte has a warm-summer humid continental climate (Köppen climate classification: Dfb) with long, very cold winters, and short, mild summers. Days with temperatures below 0 °C (32 °F) all day are very frequent from November to March, with an average 95.7 days per year. Days with maximum temperatures over 30 °C (86 °F) are not infrequent during summer, with an average of 3.3 days per year. The highest temperature on record in St Hippolyte is 36.1 °C (97.0 °F) set on 1 August 1975 and the lowest is −41.7 °C (−43.1 °F) set on 23 February 1972.

Precipitation is heavy throughout the year. Heavy snow is commonplace throughout the winter, with heavy rain in the summer. The highest daily rainfall on record is 101.1 millimetres (3.98 in) on 1 July 1979 and the record daily snowfall is 50.8 centimetres (20.0 in) on 3 February 1972, with the greatest measured snow depth being 150 centimetres (59 in) on 9 March 2008. On average, 1 centimetre (0.39 in) of snow will be lying on 154.1 days per year, with a significant accumulation of over 20 centimetres (7.9 in) lying on an average of 119.1 days per year. On average, 0.2 millimetres (0.0079 in) of rain falls on 179.0 days per year, with 25 millimetres (0.98 in) falling on 6.7 days. Days of snowfall greater than 5 centimetres (2.0 in) average at 20.3 days per year with days of snowfall greater than 25 centimetres (9.8 in) average 0.79 days per year. In March, the average snow depth is 72 centimetres (28 in).

The average frost-free period is short, averaging only 138 days per year. The last frost, on average, occurs on 15 May and the first frost of the new season occurs on 30 September.

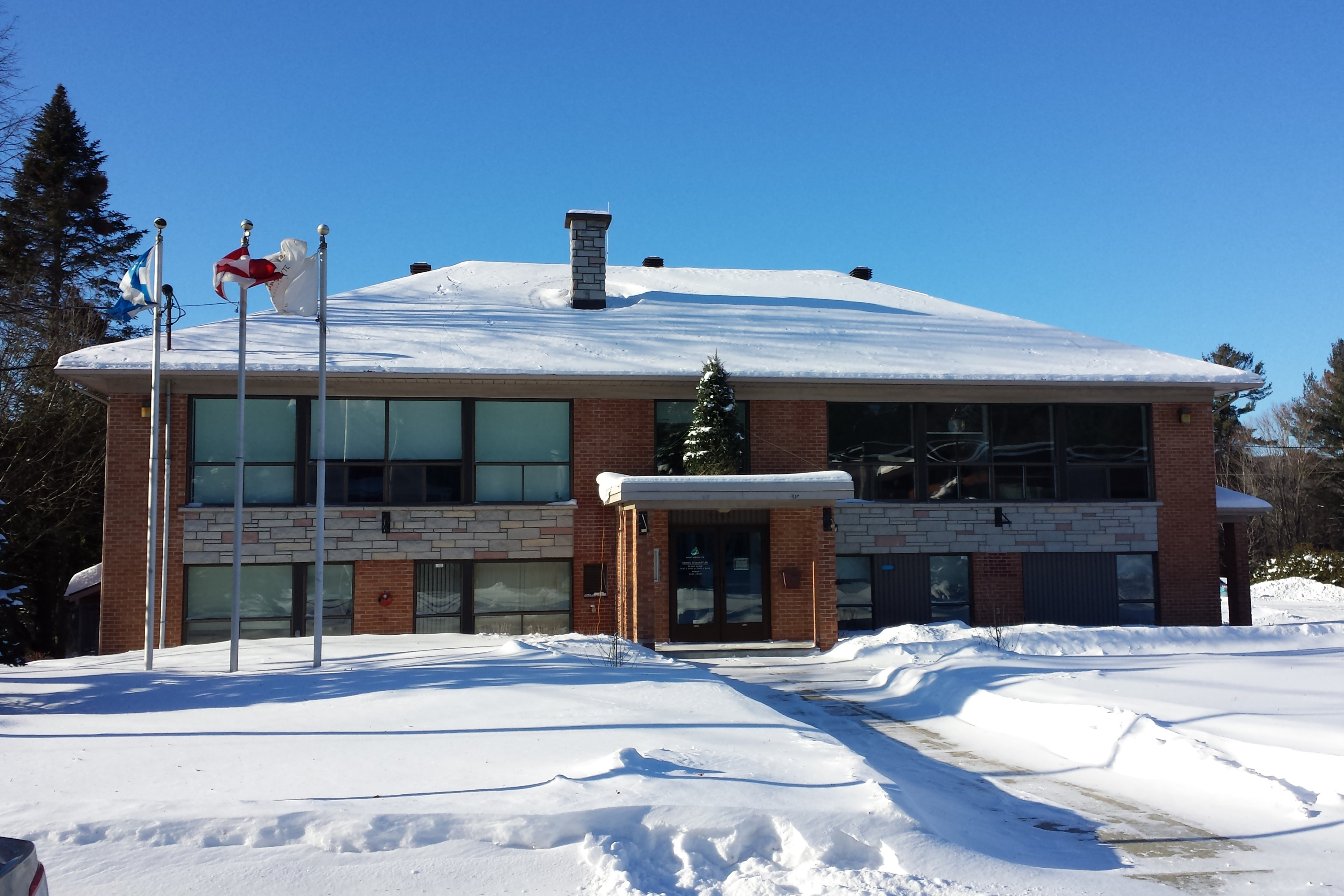
Saint-Hippolyte town hall during winter 2017

Climate data for St Hippolyte, Quebec (1981–2010 averages; 1961–present extremes)
Month	Jan	Feb	Mar	Apr	May	Jun	Jul	Aug	Sep	Oct	Nov	Dec	Year
Record high °C (°F)	10.0 (50.0)	12.5 (54.5)	24.0 (75.2)	29.5 (85.1)	33.7 (92.7)	34.0 (93.2)	35.0 (95.0)	36.1 (97.0)	33.5 (92.3)	26.1 (79.0)	19.0 (66.2)	13.0 (55.4)	36.1 (97.0)
Mean daily maximum °C (°F)	−7.1 (19.2)	−4.3 (24.3)	1.3 (34.3)	9.1 (48.4)	17.2 (63.0)	22.1 (71.8)	24.3 (75.7)	23.2 (73.8)	18.1 (64.6)	10.4 (50.7)	3.0 (37.4)	−4.0 (24.8)	9.4 (49.0)
Daily mean °C (°F)	−12.5 (9.5)	−10.4 (13.3)	−4.5 (23.9)	3.7 (38.7)	11.5 (52.7)	16.6 (61.9)	19.0 (66.2)	17.9 (64.2)	13.2 (55.8)	6.2 (43.2)	−0.6 (30.9)	−8.6 (16.5)	4.3 (39.7)
Mean daily minimum °C (°F)	−17.9 (−0.2)	−16.4 (2.5)	−10.4 (13.3)	−1.7 (28.9)	5.6 (42.1)	11.1 (52.0)	13.6 (56.5)	12.6 (54.7)	8.2 (46.8)	1.9 (35.4)	−4.2 (24.4)	−13.1 (8.4)	−0.9 (30.4)
Record low °C (°F)	−40.0 (−40.0)	−41.7 (−43.1)	−33.3 (−27.9)	−22.2 (−8.0)	−6.7 (19.9)	−0.6 (30.9)	3.9 (39.0)	1.1 (34.0)	−5.0 (23.0)	−9.0 (15.8)	−25.6 (−14.1)	−36.5 (−33.7)	−41.7 (−43.1)
Average precipitation mm (inches)	90.3 (3.56)	71.3 (2.81)	79.7 (3.14)	91.9 (3.62)	98.9 (3.89)	121.9 (4.80)	105.9 (4.17)	101.0 (3.98)	109.6 (4.31)	109.8 (4.32)	108.6 (4.28)	104.0 (4.09)	1,192.9 (46.97)
Average rainfall mm (inches)	22.2 (0.87)	16.9 (0.67)	33.5 (1.32)	77.0 (3.03)	97.8 (3.85)	121.9 (4.80)	105.9 (4.17)	101.0 (3.98)	109.5 (4.31)	104.3 (4.11)	80.0 (3.15)	31.6 (1.24)	901.6 (35.5)
Average snowfall cm (inches)	68.1 (26.8)	54.4 (21.4)	46.2 (18.2)	15.0 (5.9)	1.1 (0.4)	0.0 (0.0)	0.0 (0.0)	0.0 (0.0)	0.1 (0.0)	5.5 (2.2)	28.6 (11.3)	72.5 (28.5)	291.5 (114.7)
Average precipitation days (≥ 0.2 mm)	17.6	13.4	12.6	13.0	14.7	16.1	14.8	14.0	13.9	15.4	16.0	17.6	179.1
Average rainy days (≥ 0.2 mm)	2.5	2.3	5.2	10.9	14.7	16.1	14.8	14.0	13.9	14.7	9.6	3.6	122.3
Average snowy days (≥ 0.2 cm)	16.8	12.2	8.9	3.7	0.3	0.0	0.0	0.0	0.03	1.5	8.5	15.1	67.03
Source: Environment Canada

== Demographics ==
In the 2021 Census of Population conducted by Statistics Canada, Saint-Hippolyte had a population of 10,669 living in 4,683 of its 5,597 total private dwellings, a change of 17.1% from its 2016 population of 9,113. With a land area of 119.50 km^{2} (46.14 sq mi), it had a population density of 89.2/km^{2} (231.0/sq mi) in 2021.

Population trend:

- Population in 2021: 10,669 (2016 to 2021 population change: 17.1%)
- Population in 2016: 9,113
- Population in 2011: 8,083
- Population in 2006: 7,219
- Population in 2001: 6,039
- Population in 1996: 5,672
- Population in 1991: 4,697
- Population in 1986: 3,626
- Population in 1981: 3,597
- Population in 1976: 2,588
- Population in 1971: 1,799
- Population in 1966: 1,195
- Population in 1961: 930
- Population in 1956: 778
- Population in 1951: 788
- Population in 1941: 844
- Population in 1931: 753
- Population in 1921: 931
- Population in 1911: 896
- Population in 1901: 961
- Population in 1891: 856
- Population in 1881: 835
- Population in 1871: 967
- Population in 1861: 1,099

Private dwellings occupied by usual residents: 4,683 (total dwellings: 5,597)

Mother tongue:

- French as first language: 92.5%
- English as first language: 3.6%
- English and French as first language: 1.3%
- Other as first language: 2.4%

== Government ==
Time in office	Mayor
November 10, 1963 to November 14, 1971	Gérard Thériault
November 14, 1971 to November 9, 1975	Lucien Watier
November 9, 1975 to November 4, 1981	Roger Cabana
November 4, 1981 to November 3, 1985	Huguette Blondin-Taylor
November 3, 1985 to November 7, 1993	Georges Loulou
November 7, 1993 to November 2, 1997	Denis Laflamme
November 2, 1997 to November 6, 2005	Yves St-Onge
November 6, 2005 to November 1, 2009	Gilles Rousseau
November 1, 2009 to November 7, 2021	Bruno Laroche
November 7, 2021 to ...	Yves Dagenais

== Education ==
The Commission scolaire de la Rivière-du-Nord operates French-language public schools.

- École primaire des Hauteurs
- The primary school École des Hautbois in Saint-Colomban, Jean-Moreau in Sainte-Sophie and Sacré-Coeur in Saint-Jérôme serve sections
- École secondaire Cap-Jeunesse and École secondaire des Hauts-Sommets in Saint-Jérôme

Sir Wilfrid Laurier School Board operates English-language public schools. Schools serving the town:

- Morin Heights Elementary School in Morin-Heights serves a portion of the town
- Laurentia Elementary School in Saint-Jérôme serves a portion of the town
- Ste-Adèle Elementary School in Saint-Adèle serves a portion of the town
- Laurentian Regional High School in Lachute

== Notable people ==
- Jacques Hétu - composer and music educator
- Alexander Julien - musician, member of Vision Eternel (Echoes from Forgotten Hearts was recorded there)
- Fernand Leblanc - politician
- Monique Pariseau - writer
- Madeleine Sherwood - actress
- Bruno Spengler - racing driver
- Yannick Veilleux - professional ice hockey player
