= Quebec Route 333 =

Highway in Quebec, Canada

Route 333

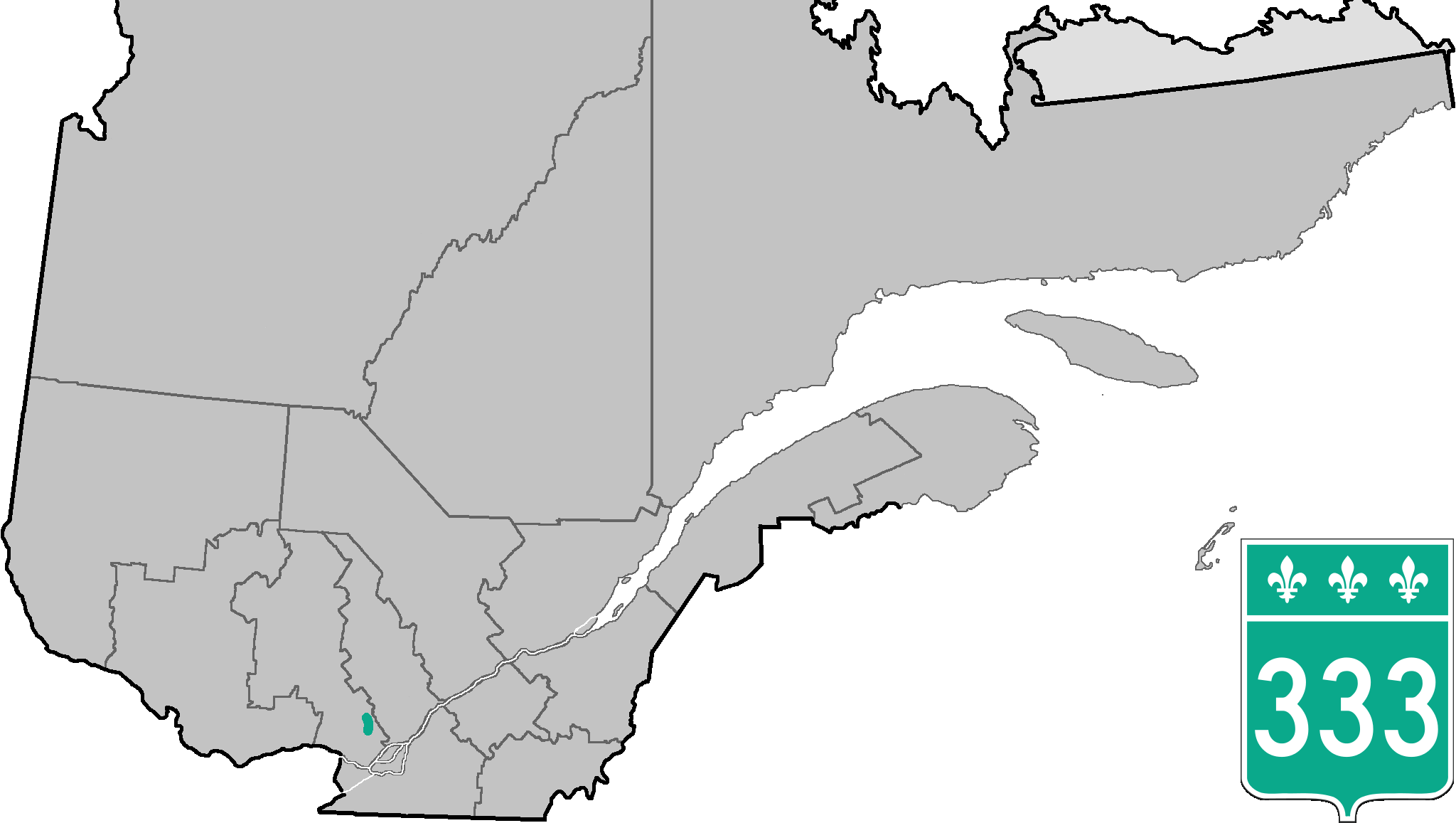

Route information
- Maintained by Transports Québec
- Length: 15.8 km (9.8 mi)

Major junctions
- South end: R-117 in Saint-Jérôme
- North end: Chemin du Lac-de-l'Achigan in Saint-Hippolyte

Location
- Country: Canada
- Province: Quebec
- Major cities: Saint-Jérôme

Highway system
- Quebec provincial highways; Autoroutes; List; Former
| ← R-329 | → R-335 |

Route 333 is a short provincial highway located in the Laurentides region of Quebec. It runs for 16 kilometers from Saint-Jérôme at the junction of Route 117 to Saint-Hippolyte and serves mainly several large lakes located between Sainte-Adèle and Saint-Jérôme.

== Municipalities along Route 333 ==
- Saint-Jérôme
- Sainte-Sophie
- Saint-Hippolyte

== Major intersections ==
The entire route is in La Rivière-du-Nord RCM.

| Location | km | mi | Destinations | Notes |
|---|---|---|---|---|
| Saint-Jérôme | 0 | 0.0 | R-117 – Mirabel, Prévost | Southern terminus |
| Saint-Hippolyte | 15.8 | 9.8 | Chemin du Lac-de-l'Achigan – Lac-de-l'Achigan | Northern terminus |
1.000 mi = 1.609 km; 1.000 km = 0.621 mi

== See also ==
- List of Quebec provincial highways
