= Monique Pariseau =

Monique Pariseau (born 1948) is a Canadian writer and educator living in Quebec.

She was born in Quebec City, Quebec, and grew up there and in Saint-Vallier. From 1983 to 1985, she taught at Safi, Morocco. She went on to teach French and literature at the Cégep de Saint-Jérôme, settling in Saint-Hippolyte. She retired from teaching in 2009.

Her first novel Les Figues de Barbarie, set in Morocco and published in 1990, finished second in the Prix Robert-Cliche competition for 1990. Her novel Le Secret was a finalist for the Prix Elle-Québec. She received second prize for her story "Brin de nid" in the Prix littéraires de Radio-Canada.

== Selected works ==
- Objets de mémoires, stories (1997)
- La Fiancée du vent, novel (2003)
- Jeanne Barret, novel (2010)
