= Commission scolaire de la Rivière-du-Nord =

School district in Quebec, Canada

Location
- Quebec; Canada

District information
- Schools: 50 (9 secondary schools and 41 primary schools)

The Commission scolaire de la Rivière-du-Nord (CSRDN) was a francophone school district in the Canadian province of Quebec. Its headquarters are in Saint-Jérôme.

It comprises several primary schools and high schools across municipalities in the Laurentides region. The commission is overseen by a board of elected school trustees.

== Schools ==
=== Secondary schools ===
- École secondaire Cap-Jeunesse (Saint-Jérôme)
- École secondaire de Mirabel (Mirabel)
- École secondaire des Hauts-Sommets (Saint-Jérôme)
- École secondaire des-Studios (Saint-Jérôme)
- École polyvalente Lavigne (Lachute)
- École polyvalente Saint-Jérôme (Saint-Jérôme)
- École secondaire Émilien-Frenette (Saint-Jérôme)
- École secondaire Le Tremplin (Lachute)
- École secondaire Saint-Stanislas (Saint-Jérôme)

=== Primary schools ===
- du Parchemin (Mirabel)
- à l'Orée-des-Bois (Saint-Colomban)
- à l'Unisson (Mirabel)
- alternative de la Fourmilière (Saint-Jérôme)
- aux Quatre-Vents (Mirabel)
- Bellefeuille (Saint-Jérôme)
- Bouchard (Brownsburg-Chatham)
- Dansereau/Saint-Martin (Grenville)
- de la Croisée-des-Champs (Mirabel)
- De La Durantaye (Saint-Jérôme)
- de la Source (Saint-Jérôme)
- de la Volière (Saint-Colomban)
- de l'Envolée (Saint-Jérôme)
- de l'Horizon-Soleil (Saint-Jérôme)
- des Falaises (Prévost)
- des Hautbois (Saint-Colomban)
- des Hauteurs (Saint-Hippolyte)
- du Champ-Fleuri (Prévost)
- du Joli-Bois (Sainte-Sophie)
- Dubois (Saint-Jérôme)
- Jean-Moreau (Sainte-Sophie)
- l'Oasis (Lachute)
- Mariboisé (Saint-Jérôme)
- Mer-et-Monde (Mirabel)
- Notre-Dame (Saint-Jérôme)
- Prévost (Saint-Jérôme)
- Richer (Saint-Jérôme)
- Sacré-Coeur (Saint-Jérôme)
- Saint-Alexandre (Lachute)
- Saint-André (Saint-André d'Argenteuil)
- Sainte-Anne (Mirabel)
- Sainte-Paule (Saint-Jérôme)
- Sainte-Sophie (Sainte-Sophie)
- Sainte-Thérèse-de-l'Enfant-Jésus (Saint-Jérôme)
- Saint-Hermas (Mirabel)
- Saint-Jean-Baptiste (Saint-Jérôme)
- Saint-Joseph (Saint-Jérôme)
- Saint-Julien (Lachute)
- Saint-Philippe (Brownsburg-Chatham)
- Sans-Frontières (Saint-Jérôme)
- Val-des-Monts (Prévost)

== See also ==
- Sir Wilfrid Laurier School Board (area Anglophone school board)
