= Saint-Jérôme Alouettes =

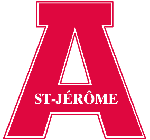
- City: Saint-Jérôme, Quebec
- League: Q.M.J.H.L.
- Operated: 1969 to 1972
- Home arena: Melançon Arena

The Saint-Jérôme Alouettes were a junior ice hockey team that played in Saint-Jérôme, Quebec, Canada. The team originated during the late 1950s in the Quebec Junior Hockey League, and played there until 1969. After which, the Alouettes joined the higher calibre Quebec Major Junior Hockey League, and played for three seasons, from 1969 to 1972.

== NHL alumni ==
Nine alumni of the Saint-Jérôme Alouettes graduated to play in the National Hockey League.

- Andre Boudrias
- Bob Champoux
- Bob Charlebois
- Bobby Guindon
- Claude Houde
- Jim Mair
- Kevin Morrison
- Jim Niekamp
- Dick Sarrazin

== Other alumni ==
Federal Court of Appeals judge Marc Nadon was drafted by the team in the 1960s.

== Yearly results ==
Season	Games	Won	Lost	Tied	Points	Pct %	Goals for	Goals against	Standing
1969-70	56	25	27	4	54	0.482	261	293	1st West
1970-71	62	25	36	1	51	0.411	260	300	7th QMJHL
1971-72	62	16	46	0	32	0.258	262	422	9th QMJHL
