= Éliane Excoffier =

Canadian photographer

- Born: 1971 (age 54–55); Saint-Jérôme, Quebec
- Website: elianeexcoffier.com

Éliane Excoffier (born 1971) is a Canadian photographer.

Her work is included in the collections of the Musée national des beaux-arts du Québec, and the Museé des beaux-arts de Montreal

In the summer of 2022, organized by the Adélard Center, Excoffier exhibited Nightlife at Mount Pinnacle in both in the village of Frelighsburg and on the trails of the Mont Pinacle Land Trust. The exhibit was composed of pictures of animals taken using motion sensing infrared cameras at Mount Pinnacle.
