= Mike McKay (ice hockey) =

Canadian ice hockey player

- Born: September 4, 1976 (age 49) Bellefeuille, Quebec, Canada
- Height: 5 ft 10 in (178 cm)
- Weight: 195 lb (88 kg; 13 st 13 lb)
- Position: Right wing
- Shot: Right
- Played for: WPHL; New Mexico Scorpions; IHL; Cincinnati Cyclones; UHL; Fort Wayne Komets; WCHL; Anchorage Aces; CHL; San Angelo Saints; QSPHL; Riviere-du-Loup Promutuel; Laval Chiefs; ECHL; Texas Wildcatters
- NHL draft: Undrafted
- Playing career: 2000–2004

Mike McKay (born September 4, 1976) is a Canadian former professional ice hockey player.

== Early life ==
McKay was born in Bellefeuille, Quebec. He played major junior hockey in the QMJHL before attending Saint Mary's University in Nova Scotia.

== Career ==
McKay began his professional career with the 1999–2000 New Mexico Scorpions of the Western Professional Hockey League, extending a five-game, mid-season tryout agreement to a full season and playoffs.

McKay went on to play five seasons of professional hockey, including two seasons (2000 to 2002) with the Fort Wayne Komets of the United Hockey League, where he scored 64 goals and 46 assists for 110 points, while earning 132 penalty minutes, in 131 games played. McKay retired following the 2003–04 season during which he played 20 games in the ECHL with the Texas Wildcatters.
