= Dick Sarrazin =

Canadian ice hockey player

- Born: January 22, 1946 (age 79); Saint-Gabriel-de-Brandon, Quebec, Canada
- Height: 6 ft 0 in (183 cm)
- Weight: 185 lb (84 kg; 13 st 3 lb)
- Position: Right wing
- Shot: Right
- Played for: Philadelphia Flyers; New England Whalers; Chicago Cougars
- Playing career: 1966–1976

Richard André Sarrazin (born January 22, 1946) is a Canadian former professional ice hockey player. He played 100 games in the National Hockey League (NHL) with the Philadelphia Flyers from 1968 to 1972 and 68 games in the World Hockey Association (WHA) with the New England Whalers and Chicago Cougars during the 1972–73 season.

== Career statistics ==
=== Regular season and playoffs ===
			Regular season					Playoffs
Season	Team	League	GP	G	A	Pts	PIM	GP	G	A	Pts	PIM
1963–64	Saint-Jerome Alouettes	QJHL	44	15	28	43	6	—	—	—	—	—
1964–65	Saint-Jerome Alouettes	QJAHL	36	29	25	54	14	8	5	7	12	2
1965–66	Saint-Jerome Alouettes	QJAHL	48	27	37	64	55	5	0	3	3	2
1966–67	Jersey Devils	EHL	69	26	28	54	20	16	3	4	7	2
1967–68	Quebec Aces	AHL	69	17	19	36	27	15	3	4	7	2
1968–69	Philadelphia Flyers	NHL	54	16	30	46	14	4	0	0	0	0
1968–69	Quebec Aces	AHL	19	7	6	13	4	—	—	—	—	—
1969–70	Philadelphia Flyers	NHL	18	1	1	2	4	—	—	—	—	—
1969–70	Quebec Aces	AHL	50	10	20	30	18	6	0	1	1	2
1970–71	Quebec Aces	AHL	70	21	53	74	39	10	5	6	11	23
1971–72	Philadelphia Flyers	NHL	28	3	4	7	4	—	—	—	—	—
1971–72	Richmond Robins	AHL	42	11	11	22	4	—	—	—	—	—
1972–73	New England Whalers	WHA	35	4	7	11	0	—	—	—	—	—
1972–73	Chicago Cougars	WHA	33	3	8	11	2	—	—	—	—	—
1973–74	Jacksonville Barons	AHL	76	20	34	54	18	—	—	—	—	—
1974–75	Syracuse Eagles	AHL	75	33	37	70	6	1	0	2	2	0
1975–76	Baltimore Clippers	AHL	55	14	13	27	14	—	—	—	—	—
WHA totals			68	7	15	22	2	—	—	—	—	—
NHL totals			100	20	35	55	22	4	0	0	0	0
