= Melançon Arena =

Indoor arena in Saint-Jérôme, Quebec

Coordinates: 45.779466°N 73.995863°W

- l'arena Melançon
- Interactive map of Melançon Arena
- Location: 451 rue Melançon, Saint-Jérôme, Quebec
- Owner: municipale de Saint-Jérôme
- Operator: municipale de Saint-Jérôme
- Capacity: Ice hockey 3,000

Construction
- Opened: 1954
- Closed: 2023

Tenants
- Saint-Jérôme Alouettes 1954-1972; Saint-Jérôme Panthers 1988-present

Melançon Arena was an indoor arena located in Saint-Jérôme, Quebec. It was once home to the Saint-Jérôme Alouettes of the Quebec Junior Hockey League from the mid-1950s to 1969 and the Quebec Major Junior Hockey League from 1969 to 1972. It was also home to the Saint-Jérôme Panthers of the Quebec Junior AAA Hockey League from 1988 to 2017.
