= Yves Locas =

Canadian ice hockey player

- Born: October 1, 1938 (age 86); St. Jerome, QC, CAN
- Height: 5 ft 10 in (178 cm)
- Weight: 174 lb (79 kg; 12 st 6 lb)
- Position: Right wing
- Shot: Left
- Played for: Hershey Bears; Pittsburgh Hornets; Springfield Indians; Providence Reds
- Playing career: 1955–1970

Yves Locas (born October 1, 1938) is a Canadian retired professional hockey player who played for the Hershey Bears, Pittsburgh Hornets, Springfield Indians and Providence Reds in the American Hockey League.
