= Pierre Dionne Labelle =

Canadian politician

Shadow Minister for National Revenue
- In office January 23, 2015 – November 19, 2015
- Leader: Thomas Mulcair
- Preceded by: Murray Rankin
- Succeeded by: Ziad Aboultaif

Member of Parliament for Rivière-du-Nord
- In office May 18, 2011 – August 4, 2015
- Preceded by: Monique Guay
- Succeeded by: Rhéal Fortin

Personal details
- Born: June 4, 1955 (age 70) Saint-Jérôme, Quebec, Canada
- Party: Green Party
- Other political affiliations: NDP (2011–2018)
- Profession: Columnist, community activist, community development advisor

Pierre Dionne Labelle (born June 4, 1955) is a Canadian politician, who was elected to the House of Commons of Canada in the 2011 election. He represented the electoral district of Rivière-du-Nord as a member of the New Democratic Party.

Prior to being elected, Dionne Labelle was a development agent.

Dionne Labelle joined the Green Party in November 2018.
