= Cégep de Saint-Jérôme =

Public college in Saint-Jérôme, Quebec

- Motto: De cœur et de savoir (French)
- Motto in English: Of heart and knowledge
- Type: Public CEGEP
- Academic affiliations: ACCC, CCAA, QSSF, AUCC,
- Location: Saint-Jérôme, Quebec, Canada; 45°46′42.60″N 74°0′4.23″W
- Campus: Urban
- Website: www.cstj.qc.ca

The CEGEP of Saint-Jérôme (French: Cégep de Saint-Jérôme (CSTJ)) is a post-secondary education school in the Laurentides region of province of Quebec, Canada. There are three campuses affiliated to the CSTJ, the main one is located at Saint-Jérôme; the two others are in Mont-Tremblant and Mont-Laurier.

== History ==
The college traces its origins to the merger of several institutions which became public ones in 1967, when the Quebec system of CEGEPs was created. The building had been a Catholic school directed by the sisters of Saint Anne. The Cégep de Saint-Jérôme gained its independence in 1970. At its start it had two wings, wing A built in 1929 and wing B built in 1963. In the 1970s, three new wings were constructed. In 2007, a new wing was constructed for the Centre d'études universitaires des Laurentides, a branch campus of the Université du Québec en Outaouais. In 2017, the K wing has been inaugurated to respond to the growing number of students in the college.

== Programs ==
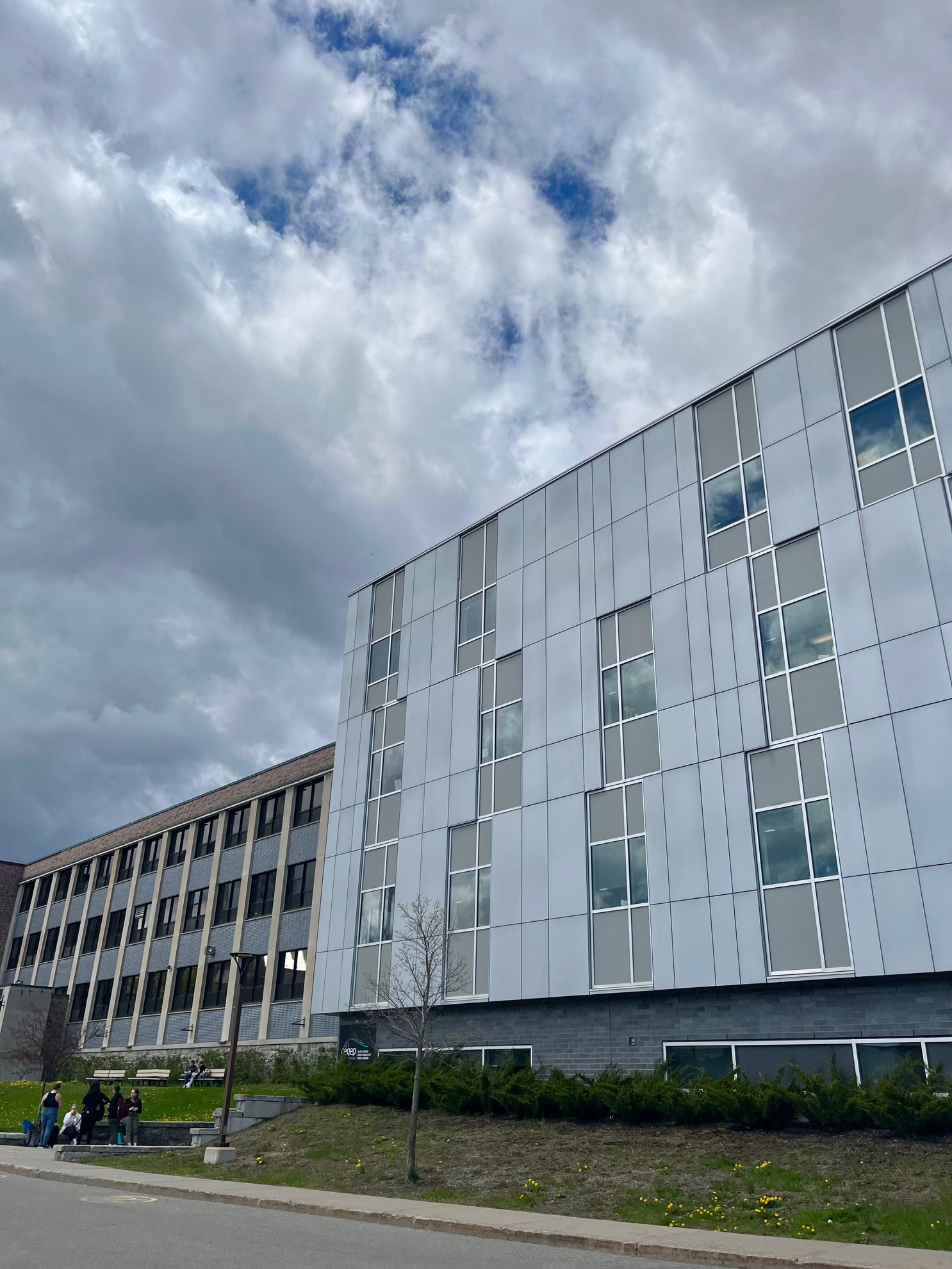
Cégep de Saint-Jérôme

The Province of Quebec awards a Diploma of Collegial Studies for two types of programs: two years of pre-university studies or three years of vocational (technical) studies. The pre-university programs, which take two years to complete, cover the subject matters which roughly correspond to the additional year of high school given elsewhere in Canada in preparation for a chosen field in university. The technical programs, which take three years to complete, applies to students who wish to pursue a skill trade. In addition Continuing education and services to business are provided.

== Notable alumni ==
- Marquise Lepage (born 1959), producer, screenwriter, and film and television director

== See also ==
- List of colleges in Quebec
- Higher education in Quebec
