= Rivière du Nord (Laurentides) =

Coordinates: 45°31′08″N 74°20′11″W

Rivière du Nord (Ottawa River)
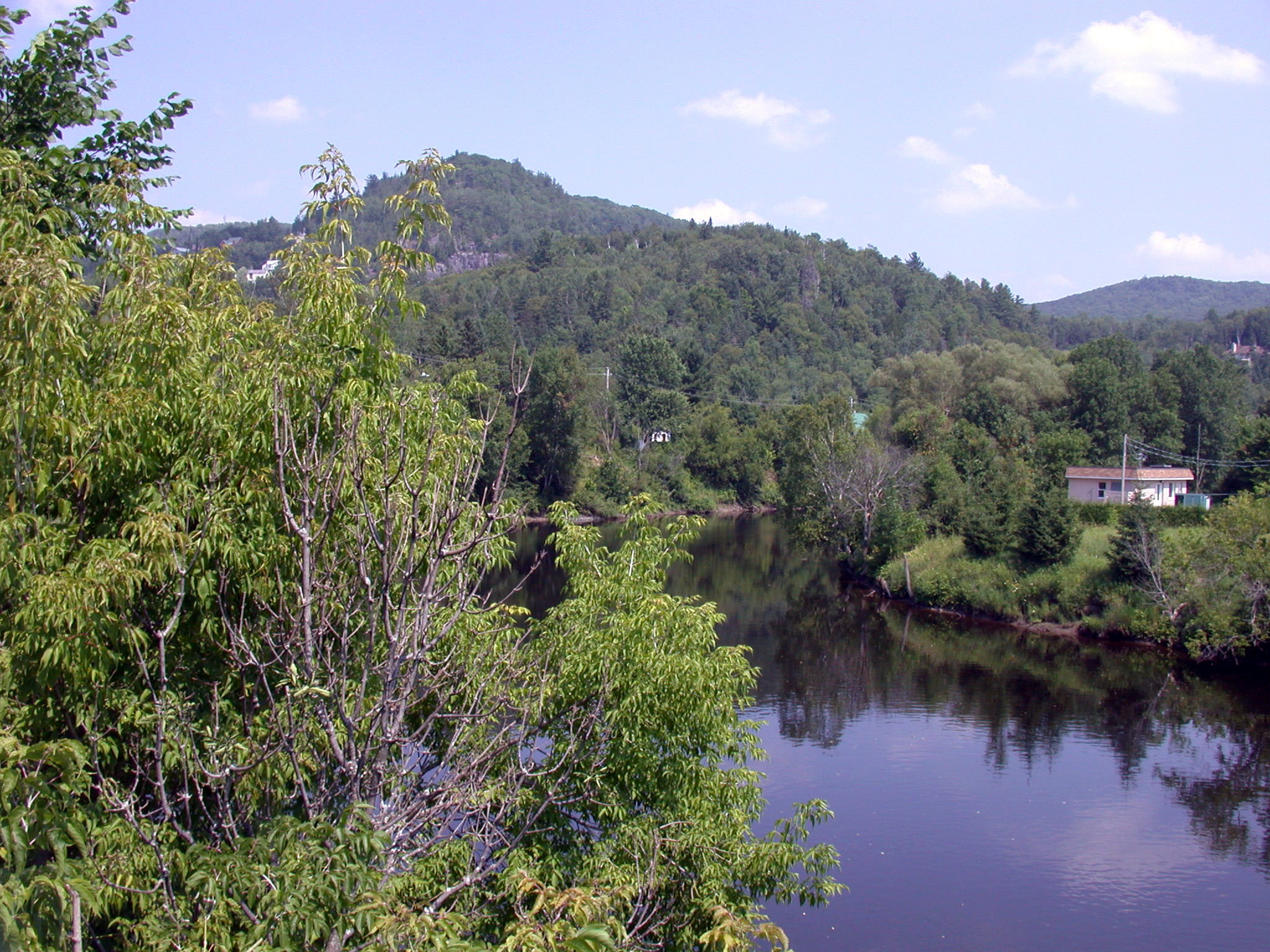
- Rivière du Nord at Piedmont, Quebec

Location
- Country: Canada

Physical characteristics
- Source
  - location: Lac Brûlé, Quebec
- Mouth
  - location: Ottawa River

Basin features
- Progression: Ottawa River→ St. Lawrence River→ Gulf of St. Lawrence
- River system: Ottawa River drainage basin

Rivière du Nord (French pronunciation: [ʁivjɛʁ dy nɔʁ]) is a tributary of the Ottawa River located in the Laurentides region in southwest Quebec, Canada.

== Geography ==
Rising from its source at Lac Brûlé, the Rivière du Nord comes from the north-northwest rather than from the north and flows east of Sainte-Agathe-des-Monts and waters several settlements, including Val-David, Sainte-Adèle, Prévost (formerly Shawbridge) and Saint-Jérôme. From there, it winds its way west-southwest to Lachute, waters Saint-André-Est before emptying into the Ottawa River at the entrance to Lac des Deux Montagnes.

== Toponymy ==
The origin of this toponym dates back to the seventeenth century. Mention of the "Rivière du Nord" is mentioned in the deed of 7 June 1680, by which Intendant Jacques Duchesneau granted the seigneury of Argenteuil to Charles-Joseph d'Ailleboust Des Muceaux. Subsequently, this toponym has remained stable. The name can be explained by the fact that the river comes from the north or that the region through it was, at the time, considered the North.

== History ==
A colourful character is linked to this region. Antoine Labelle (1833-1891), parish priest of Saint-Jérôme from 1868 to 1891 and deputy commissioner of the Department of Agriculture and Colonization from 1888 to 1890, used this waterway to visit and support the many settlers who settled between Saint-Jérôme and Mont-Laurier.
