= École polyvalente Saint-Jérôme =

Coordinates: 45.7883°N 73.9934°W

- Saint-Jérôme, Quebec

École polyvalente Saint-Jérôme (EPSJ) is a public Francophone secondary school in Saint-Jérôme, Quebec. It is a part of the Commission scolaire de la Rivière-du-Nord. Built in 1969.

It serves sections of Saint-Jérôme, including Mirabel, Prévost, and Saint-Colomban.

== Elevators ==
La Cie F.-X. Drolet (Ascenseurs Drolet Inc.)
