= La Rivière-du-Nord Regional County Municipality =

La Rivière-du-Nord
- Regional county municipality
- Coordinates: 45°49′N 74°01′W
- Country: Canada
- Province: Quebec
- Region: Laurentides
- Effective: January 1, 1983
- County seat: Saint-Jérôme

Government
  - Type: Prefecture
  - Prefect: Yvon Brière

Area
  - Total: 466.10 km^{2} (179.96 sq mi)
  - Land: 451.02 km^{2} (174.14 sq mi)

Population (2016)
  - Total: 128,170
  - Density: 284.2/km^{2} (736/sq mi)
  - Change 2011-2016: ▲11.3%
  - Dwellings: 58,580
- Time zone: UTC−5 (EST)
  - Summer (DST): UTC−4 (EDT)
- Area codes: 450 and 579
- Website: mrcrdn.qc.ca

La Rivière-du-Nord (French pronunciation: [la ʁivjɛʁ dy nɔʁ]; The Rivière-du-Nord or The River of the North) is a regional county municipality in the Laurentides region of Quebec, Canada. The seat is in Saint-Jérôme. It is named for the river that runs through it, the Rivière du Nord.

Its population according to the 2016 Canadian Census was 128,170.

== Subdivisions ==
There are 5 subdivisions within the RCM:

Cities & Towns (3)

- Prévost
- Saint-Colomban
- Saint-Jérôme

Municipalities (2)

- Saint-Hippolyte
- Sainte-Sophie

Canada Census Mother Tongue - La Rivière-du-Nord, Quebec
| Census | Total | French | | | English | | | French & English | | | Other | | |
| Year | Responses | Count | Trend | Pop % | Count | Trend | Pop % | Count | Trend | Pop % | Count | Trend | Pop % |
| 2016 | 126,525 | 119,570 | ▲10.35%% | 94.5% | 2,400 | ▲1.47% | 1.89% | 935 | ▲19,1% | 0.74% | 3,215 | ▲35.94% | 2.54% |
| 2011 | 114,230 | 108,350 | ▲13.64% | 94.85% | 2,385 | ▲16.06% | 2.09% | 785 | ▲45.37% | 0.69% | 2,415 | ▲6.38% | 2.11% |
| 2006 | 100.205 | 95,340 | ▲11.85% | 95,14% | 2,055 | ▲15.12% | 2.05% | 540 | ▼0.9% | 0.53% | 2,270 | ▲92.37% | 2.26% |
| 2001 | 88,750 | 85,235 | ▲7.94% | 96% | 1,785 | ▼2.46% | 2.01% | 545 | ▼29.65% | 0.61% | 1,180 | ▲31.1% | 1,33% |
| 1996 | 82,540 | 78,965 | n/a | 95,67% | 1,830 | n/a | 2.21% | 775 | n/a | 0.93% | 900 | n/a | 1.09% |

== Transportation ==
=== Access Routes ===
Highways and numbered routes that run through the municipality, including external routes that start or finish at the county border:

- Autoroutes
  - A-15 (TCH)
- Principal Highways
  - R-117
  - R-158
- Secondary Highways
  - R-333
- External Routes
  - None

== See also ==
- List of regional county municipalities and equivalent territories in Quebec
