= Sainte-Sophie =

- Municipality
- Sainte-Sophie
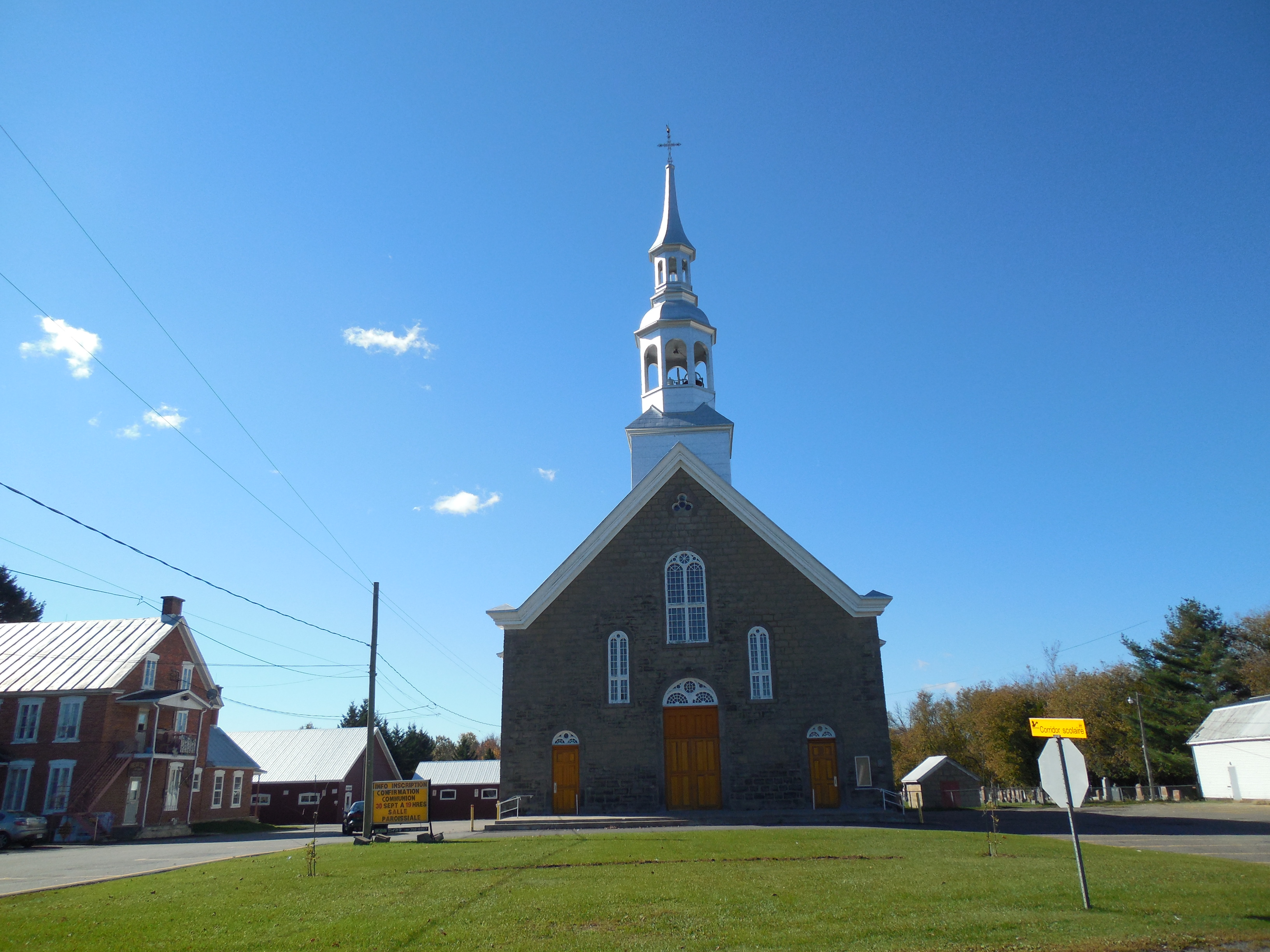
- Sainte-Sophie's church

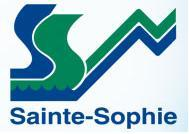
- Logo

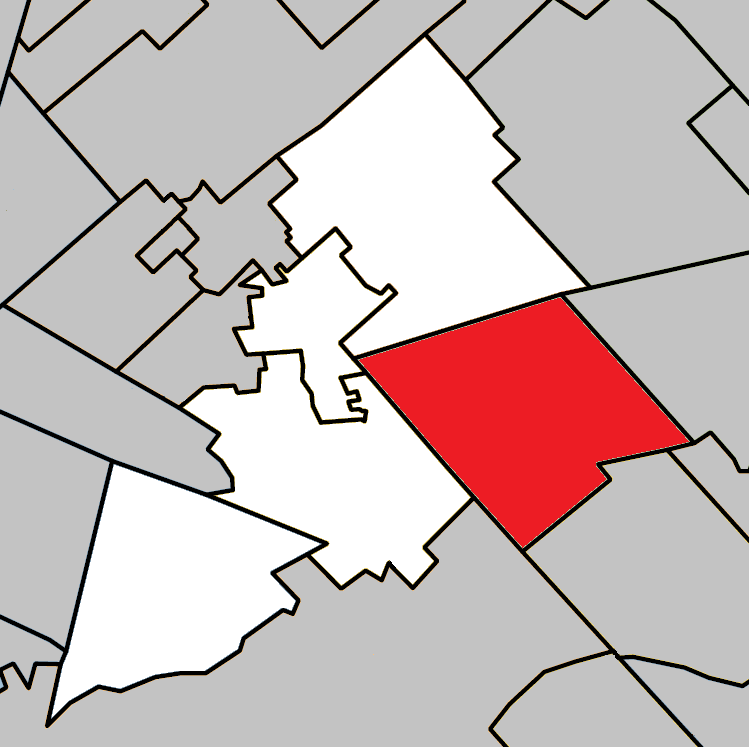
- Location within La Rivière-du-Nord RCM

- Location in central Quebec
- Coordinates: 45°49′N 73°54′W
- Country: Canada
- Province: Quebec
- Region: Laurentides
- RCM: La Rivière-du-Nord
- Constituted: May 3, 2000

Government
  - Mayor: Guy Lamothe
  - Federal riding: Rivière-du-Nord
  - Prov. riding: Prévost

Area
  - Municipality: 111.50 km^{2} (43.05 sq mi)
  - Land: 111.20 km^{2} (42.93 sq mi)
  - Urban: 6.78 km^{2} (2.62 sq mi)

Population (2021)
  - Municipality: 18,080
  - Density: 162.6/km^{2} (421/sq mi)
  - Urban: 4,687
  - Urban density: 691.3/km^{2} (1,790/sq mi)
  - Pop 2016-2021: ▲15.2%
  - Dwellings: 7,490
- Time zone: UTC−05:00 (EST)
  - Summer (DST): UTC−04:00 (EDT)
- Postal code(s): J5J
- Area codes: 450 and 579
- Highways: R-158; R-333
- Website: www.stesophie.ca

Sainte-Sophie (French pronunciation: [sɛ̃t sɔfi]) is a municipality in the Laurentides region of Quebec, Canada, part of the La Rivière-du-Nord Regional County Municipality.

== History ==
The new Municipality of Sainte-Sophie was created on May 2, 2000, when the old Municipality of Sainte-Sophie was merged with the Village Municipality of New Glasgow.

== Demographics ==
Population trend:

- Population in 2021: 18,080 (2016 to 2021 population change: 15.2%)
- Population in 2016: 15,690 (2011 to 2016 population change: 17.3%)
- Population in 2011: 13,375 (2006 to 2011 population change: 29.2%)
- Population in 2006: 10,355 (2001 to 2006 population change: 15.5%)
- Population in 2001: 8,966 (1996 to 2001 population change: 5.1%)
- Population in 1996: 8,534 (1991 to 1996 population change: 15.7%)
- Population in 1991: 7,377 (1986 to 1991 population change: 17%)
- Population in 1986: 6,304 (1981 to 1986 population change: 8%)
- Population in 1981: 5,838 (1976 to 1981 population change: 42.9%)
- Population in 1976: 4,084 (1971 to 1976 population change: 20.5%)
- Population in 1971: 3,388 (1966 to 1971 population change: 54.4%)
- Population in 1966: 2,195 (1961 to 1966 population change: 46.1%)
- Population in 1961: 1,502 (1956 to 1961 population change: 16.3%)
- Population in 1956: 1,292 (1951 to 1956 population change: 13.3%)
- Population in 1951: 1,140 (1941 to 1951 population change: -0.2%)
- Population in 1941: 1,142 (1931 to 1941 population change: 4.8%)
- Population in 1931: 1,090 (1921 to 1931 population change: 20.3%)
- Population in 1921: 906 (1911 to 1921 population change: -20.2%)
- Population in 1911: 1,135 (1901 to 1911 population change: 2.1%)
- Population in 1901: 1,112 (1891 to 1901 population change: -11.4%)
- Population in 1891: 1,255 (1881 to 1891 population change: -22.8%)
- Population in 1881: 1,625 (1871 to 1881 population change: 24%)
- Population in 1871: 1,311 (1861 to 1871 population change: -22.1%)
- Population in 1861: 1,684

Private dwellings occupied by usual residents: 7,211 (total dwellings: 7,490)

Canada Census Mother Tongue - Sainte-Sophie, Quebec
Census	Total	French			English			French & English			Other		
Year	Responses	Count	Trend	Pop %	Count	Trend	Pop %	Count	Trend	Pop %	Count	Trend	Pop %
2021	18,080	17,125	▲14.5%	94.7%	340	▲30.8%	1.9%	200	▲90.5%	1.1%	370	▲42.3%	2.0%
2016	15,615	14,950	▲17.8%	95.7%	260	▼3.7%	1.7%	105	0.0%	0.7%	260	▲48.6%	1.7%
2011	13,275	12,690	▲29.0%	95.6%	270	▲45.9%	2.0%	105	▲320.0%	0.8%	175	▼10.3%	1.3%
2006	10,245	9,835	▲15.8%	96.0%	185	▼17.8%	1.8%	25	▲66.7%	0.2%	195	▲44.4%	1.9%
2001	8,870	8,490	▲6.7%	95.7%	225	▼8.2%	2.5%	15	▼78.6%	0.2%	135	▲35.0%	1.5%
1996	8,380	7,955	n/a	94.2%	245	n/a	2.9%	70	n/a	0.8%	100	n/a	1.2%

== Arts and culture ==
A supervillain from the DC Comics series Green Arrow, Simon Lacroix, alias Komodo, is originally from Sainte-Sophie. The character was created by Canadian comic book artist Jeff Lemire in issue 17 of the New 52 series of Green Arrow. He appears in the television series of the same name in episode 2 of season 3.

== Infrastructure ==
=== Public Library ===
Sainte-Sophie have a public library for its citizens located next to the city hall. The library contains over 30,000 diverse publications.

== Sports ==
Sainte-Sophie offers a variety of sports and recreational facilities managed by the municipal leisure, culture and community life department. to support active living for residents of all ages.

=== Outdoor and Community Sports Facilities ===
Sainte-Sophie maintains several outdoor sports venues, including parks and dedicated sport surfaces, which serve as hubs for community recreation and organized activities.

- Outdoor skating rinks – Multiple outdoor skating rinks are available during the winter season, providing residents with space for ice skating and informal hockey play. These rinks operate on a regular seasonal schedule, typically opening in late December and offering set hours for public use.
- Sport plateaus – Sainte-Sophie’s sport plateaus encompass a range of active outdoor areas, such as open fields and courts. These spaces support a variety of sports and informal physical activities for individuals and groups.
- Tennis courts – Tennis facilities are available near the Pavillon Lionel-Renaud, where residents can access courts with a municipal key. Play duration may be limited during peak times to accommodate community demand.
- Pickleball courts – Reflecting the growing popularity of the sport, pickleball courts are provided at locations including Parc Lionel-Renaud and Parc David-Brière. These courts allow for casual and organized play of this racquet sport.

Skateparks and jeux d’eau (water play zones) at parks such as Parc Sophie-Masson and Parc David-Brière offer additional active recreational options for youth and families throughout warmer months.

=== Organized Sport and Community Clubs ===
Residents can also participate in structured sport programming and join local sport organizations. The municipality’s recreational services coordinate or promote activities through community clubs, including minor baseball, gymnastics, speed skating (in collaboration with neighbouring communities), and soccer, fostering participation across different age groups and skill levels.

== Education ==
The Commission scolaire de la Rivière-du-Nord operates French-language public schools.

- École primaire du Joli-Bois
- École primaire Jean-Moreau
- École primaire Sainte-Sophie
- The primary school Sacré-Coeur in Saint-Jérôme serves a section
- École secondaire Cap-Jeunesse and École secondaire des Hauts-Sommets in Saint-Jérôme

Sir Wilfrid Laurier School Board operates English-language public schools. Schools serving the town:

- Laurentia Elementary School in Saint-Jérôme
- Heritage Elementary School in Saint-Lin-Laurentides
- Laurentian Regional High School in Lachute
