= Prévost, Quebec =

Prévost
- City
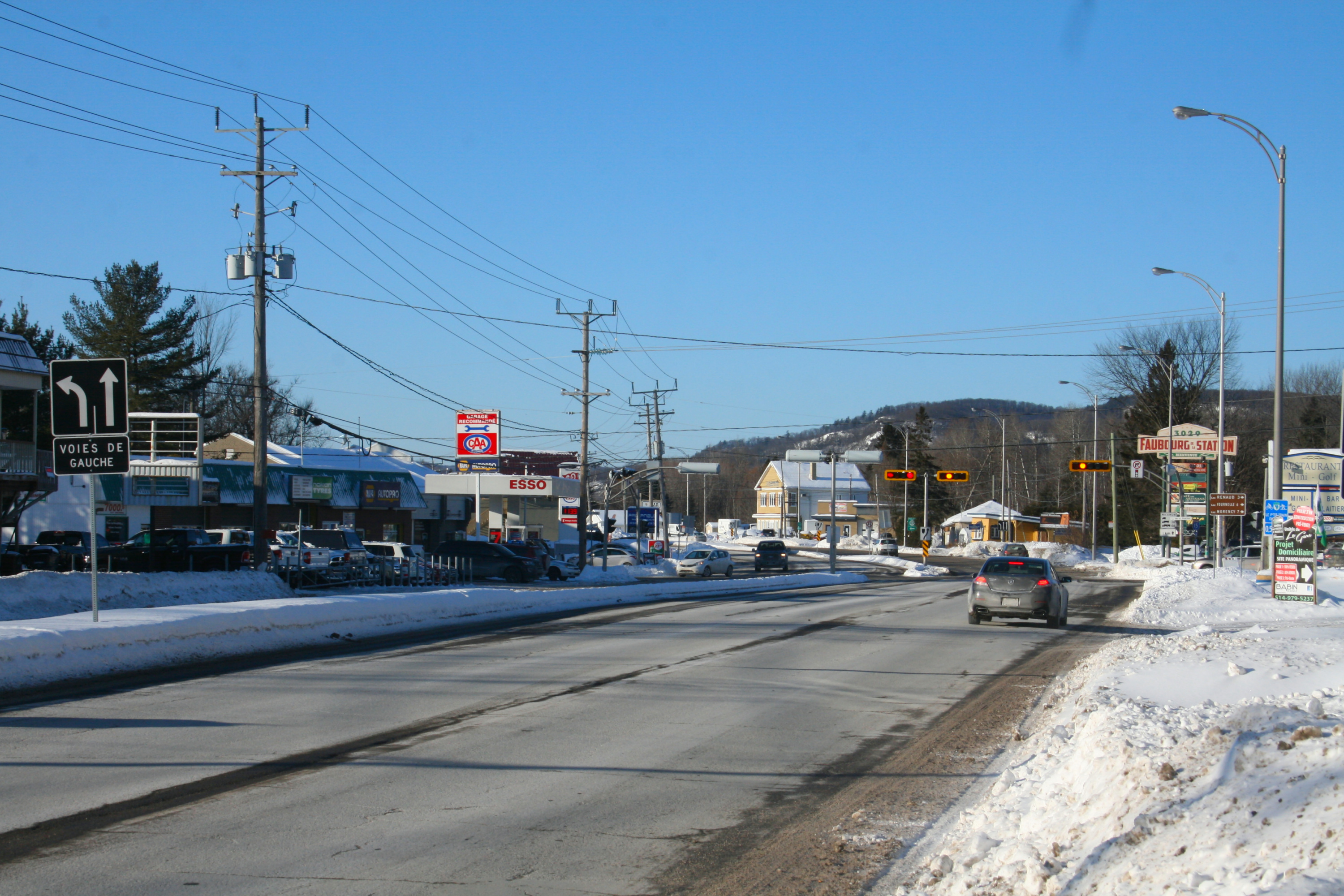
- Highway 117 in Prévost

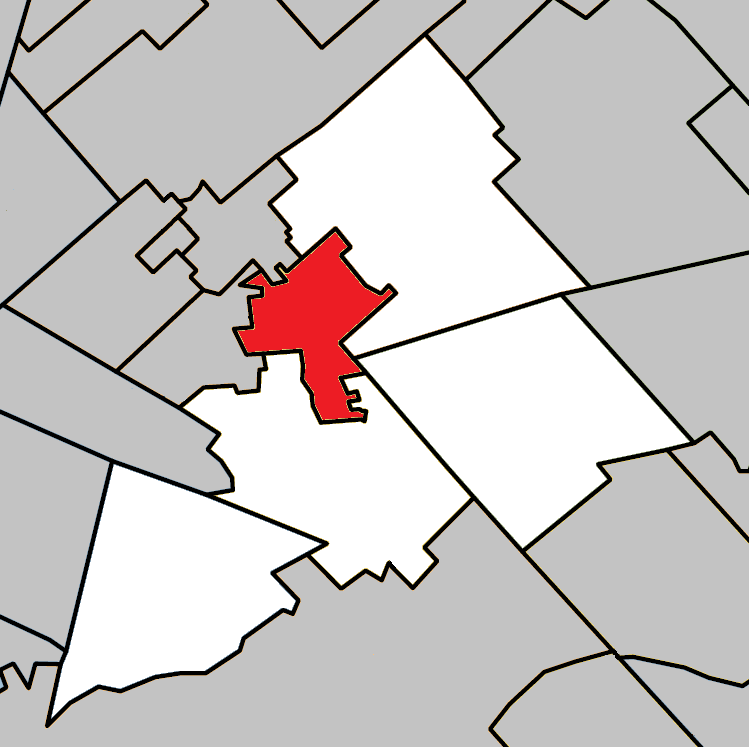
- Location within La Rivière-du-Nord RCM

- Location in central Quebec
- Coordinates: 45°52′N 74°05′W
- Country: Canada
- Province: Quebec
- Region: Laurentides
- RCM: La Rivière-du-Nord
- Settled: 1842
- Constituted: January 20, 1973

Government
  - Mayor: Paul Germain
  - Federal riding: Les Pays-d'en-Haut
  - Prov. riding: Prévost

Area
  - City: 35.15 km^{2} (13.57 sq mi)
  - Land: 34.13 km^{2} (13.18 sq mi)
  - Water: 1.02 km^{2} (0.39 sq mi)
  - Urban: 10.02 km^{2} (3.87 sq mi)

Population (2026)
  - City: 14,286
  - Density: 399.3/km^{2} (1,034/sq mi)
  - Urban: 7,967
  - Urban density: 796/km^{2} (2,060/sq mi)
  - Pop 2016-2021: ▲5.3%
  - Dwellings: 5,722
- Demonym(s): Prévostois, Prévostoises
- Time zone: UTC−5 (EST)
  - Summer (DST): UTC−4 (EDT)
- Postal code(s): J0R
- Area codes: 450 and 579
- Highways A-15 (TCH): R-117
- Website: www.ville.prevost.qc.ca

Prévost (French pronunciation: [pʁevo]) is a town within the La Rivière-du-Nord Regional County Municipality, Quebec, Canada, and the administrative region of Laurentides in the Laurentian Mountains, north of Montreal. It was created in 1973 from the amalgamation of the former villages of Shawbridge and Lesage with old Prévost on the other side of the Rivière du Nord. Shawbridge was named after William Shaw (1805-1894) who settled in the township of Abercromby in 1847 and built the first bridge over the Rivière du Nord.

It is known for its cross-country skiing and for the Shawbridge Boys' Farm, a youth detention centre operated by Batshaw Youth Services. Route 117, also known as Curé-Labelle Boulevard, is the town's main street crossing the city from south to north. Autoroute 15, the Laurentian Autoroute, also serves the town. The city's main roads also include chemin du Lac-Écho and rue de la Station which both lead to nearby Saint-Hippolyte, Quebec.

Prévost was formerly known as Shawbridge until 1973.

Police services are provided by the Sûreté du Québec, the provincial police force.

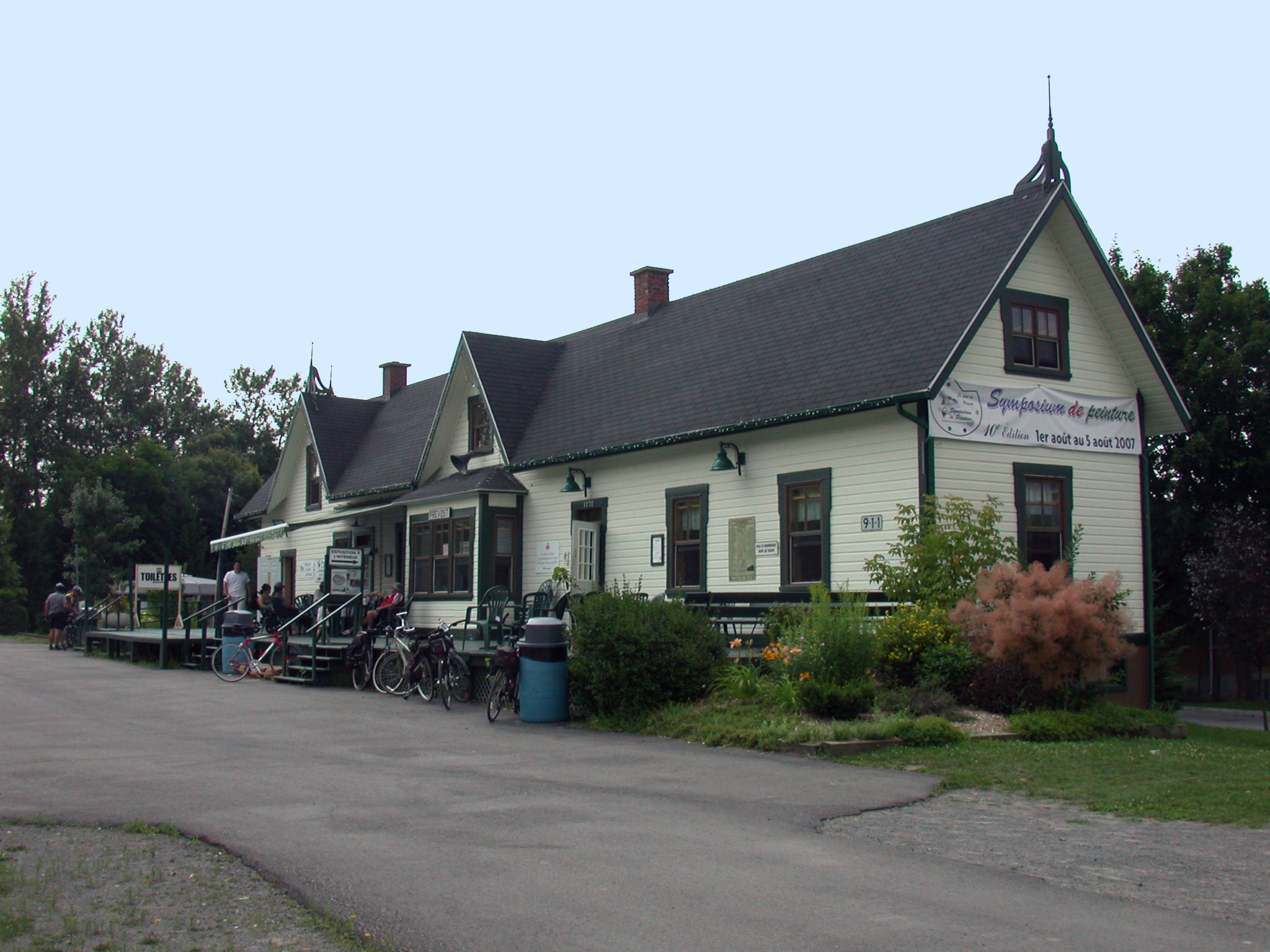
Former train station

Shawbridge was formerly served by freight and passenger services of the Canadian Pacific Railway. The Prévost railway station is now a community centre and stop on the Parc Linéaire Le P'tit Train du Nord bicycle and hiking trail.

Shawbridge and old Prévost were traditionally linked by the Shaw bridge, built in 1923 as a replacement for William Shaw's wooden bridge, over the Rivière du Nord. The bridge was closed by the Quebec government in late June 2008 as unsafe, forcing pedestrians to walk along the highway, but local residents and the town's mayor, Claude Charbonneau, have asked that the bridge be reopened, at least for pedestrian and bicycle traffic. The Quebec Ministry of Transport reopened the bridge on August 28, 2008, but only for pedestrians and bicyclists.

== History ==
The territory of Prévost is mainly part of the Augmentation-des-Mille-Îles seigneury, created in 1752. A few lands are located in the Abercrombie Township, established in 1842. Initially, it was part of the parish of Sainte-Anne-des-Plaines and later of Saint-Jérôme, following the creation of the latter in 1834. The western part of the territory joined the parish of Saint-Sauveur in 1854.

The first settlers arrived in the southern part of Prévost’s territory as early as the 1820s. Several French-speaking families, such as the Lesage and Dagenais families, settled there. A small English-speaking Protestant colony established itself further north, in the area called Mount Pleasant, which would later become Shawbridge. Among the settlers, William Shaw settled there around 1831.

In 1842, a census recorded 52 inhabitants in the territory of Prévost. At the request of Augustin-Norbert Morin, a bridge was built over the Rivière du Nord in 1848 by carpenter André Lesage, a local resident. Morin remained the owner until 1863, when he sold it to William Shaw, who owned the lot next to the structure. Shaw sold it the following year to the County of Terrebonne.

On April 27, 1909, the municipality of Shawbridge was founded by detaching parts of the parishes of Saint-Jérôme, Saint-Sauveur, and Saint-Hippolyte.

The municipality was initially developed as a summer resort, particularly popular with Montreal’s Jewish community. The arrival of the Canadian Pacific Railway in 1892 contributed to the growth of summer and winter tourism in Prévost’s territory. The introduction of snow trains, nearby ski hills and lakes, as well as the increase in hotels and boarding houses, made Prévost a popular vacation destination until the 1950s.

Meanwhile, two other municipalities were formed nearby: the municipality of Prévost on September 30, 1927, and the Village of Lesage on January 1, 1948. The union of the three municipalities took place in 1973 under the name “Municipal Corporation of Shawbridge.” The final name of Prévost was established on October 15, 1977.

Prévost officially acquired city status on May 8, 1999.

The city’s police services are provided by the Sûreté du Québec.

== Geography ==
Prévost is located in the Laurentides region of Quebec, Canada, nestled along the Rivière du Nord and surrounded by rolling hills and dense forests. The city lies approximately 60 kilometers north of Montreal and is part of the Laurentian mountain range, known for its scenic beauty and outdoor recreational opportunities. Its geography includes a mix of residential areas, green spaces, and natural features such as lakes, streams, and wooded areas, contributing to its appeal as both a commuter town and a destination for nature enthusiasts.

== Demographics ==
In the 2021 Census of Population conducted by Statistics Canada, Prévost had a population of 13,692 living in 5,532 of its 5,722 total private dwellings, a change of 5.3% from its 2016 population of 13,002. With a land area of 34.29 km^{2} (13.24 sq mi), it had a population density of 399.3/km^{2} (1,034.2/sq mi) in 2021.

Historical census data - Prévost, Quebec

Year	Pop.	±%
1976	3,298	—
1981	4,716	+43.0%
1986	5,229	+10.9%
1991	6,024	+15.2%

Year	Pop.	±%
1996	7,308	+21.3%
2001	8,280	+13.3%
2006	10,132	+22.4%
2011	11,747	+15.9%

Year	Pop.	±%
2016	13,002	+10.7%
2021	13,692	+5.3%

Source: Statistics Canada

Canada census – Prévost community profile

	2021	2016
Population	13,692 (+5.3% from 2016)	13,002 (+6.8% from 2011)
Land area	34.29 km^{2} (13.24 sq mi)	34.58 km^{2} (13.35 sq mi)
Population density	399.3/km^{2} (1,034/sq mi)	376.0/km^{2} (974/sq mi)
Median age	44.8 (M: 44.8, F: 44.8)	43.4 (M: 43.7, F: 43.1)
Private dwellings	5,722 (total) 5,532 (occupied)	5,413 (total)
Median household income	$96,000	$80,183

References: 2021 2016

Mother tongue:

- English as first language: 2.3%
- French as first language: 94.2%
- English and French as first language: 1.7%
- Other as first language: 1.8%

== Education ==
Commission scolaire de la Rivière-du-Nord operates Francophone schools:

- Champ-Fleuri, Val-des-monts, Des Falaises
- École polyvalente Saint-Jérôme in Saint-Jérôme

Sir Wilfrid Laurier School Board operates English-language public schools. Schools serving the town:

- Morin Heights Elementary School in Morin-Heights
- Laurentian Regional High School in Lachute

Previously Batshaw High School was in Prévost.
