= Saint-Colomban, Quebec =

Saint-Colomban
- City
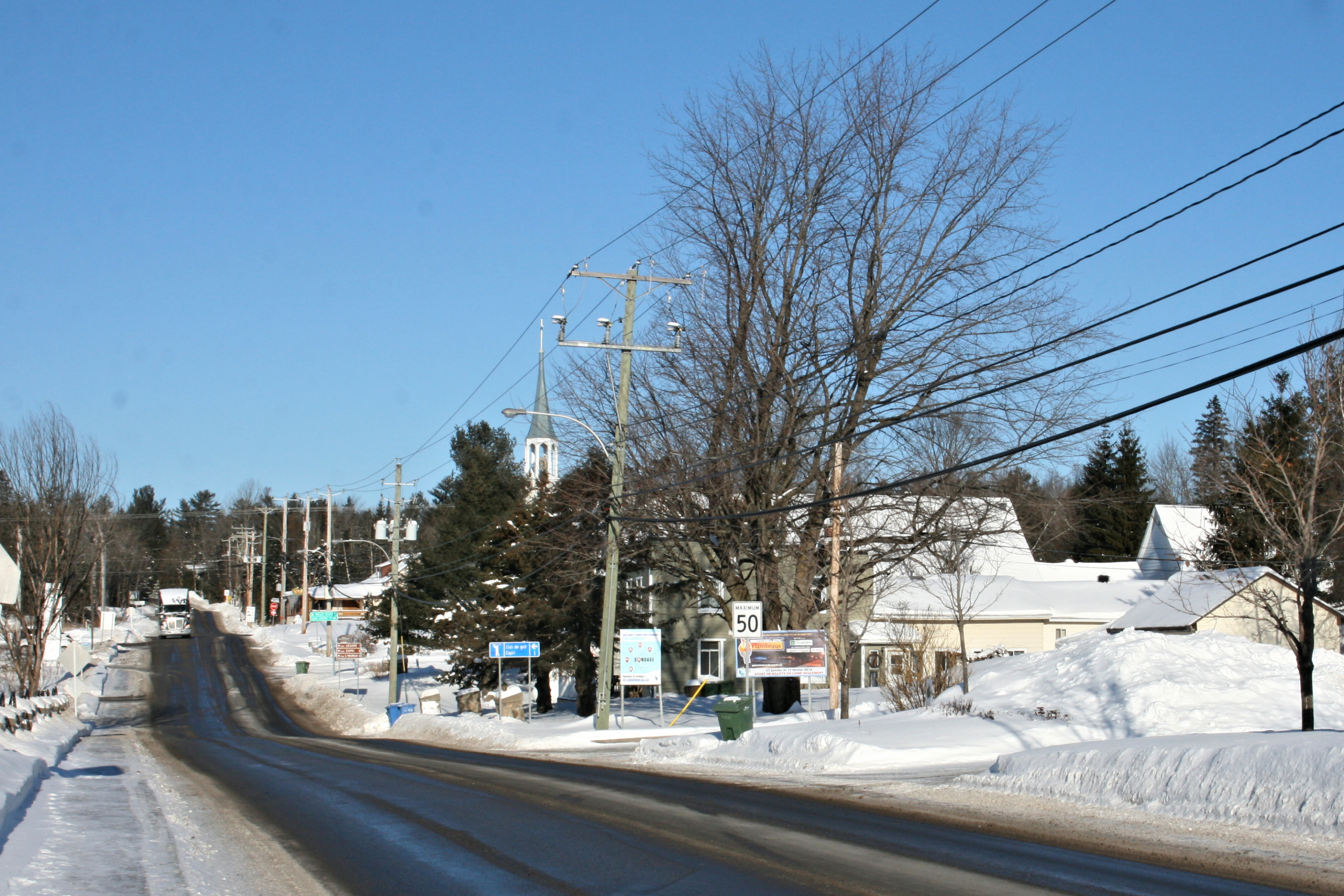
- Saint-Colomban in winter

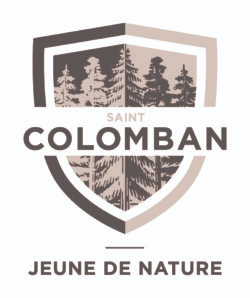
- Logo

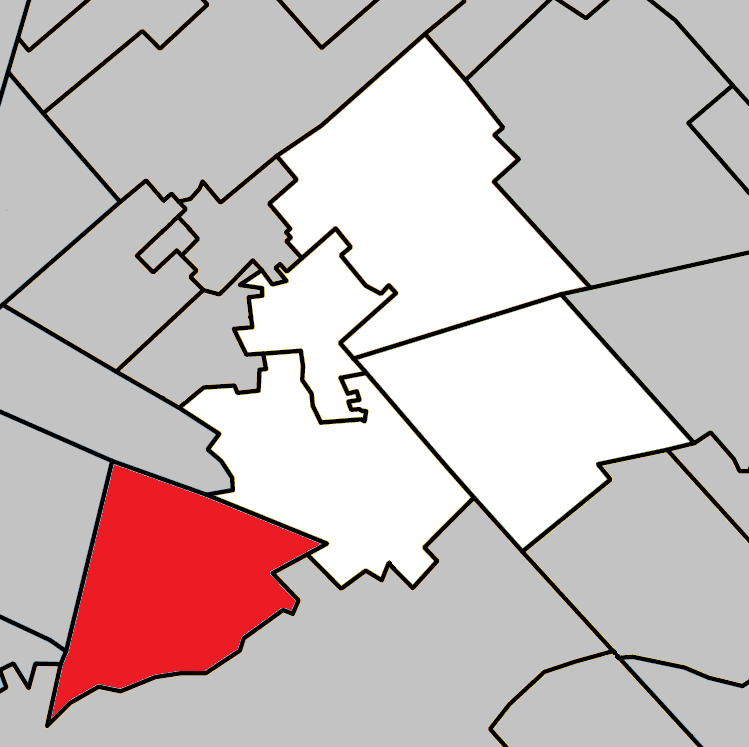
- Location within La Rivière-du-Nord RCM

- Location in central Quebec
- Coordinates: 45°44′N 74°08′W
- Country: Canada
- Province: Quebec
- Region: Laurentides
- RCM: La Rivière-du-Nord
- Constituted: July 1, 1855

Government
  - Mayor: Xavier-Antoine Lalande
  - Federal riding: Les Pays-d'en-Haut
  - Prov. riding: Argenteuil

Area
  - Total: 94.00 km^{2} (36.29 sq mi)
  - Land: 92.71 km^{2} (35.80 sq mi)

Population (2021)
  - Total: 17,740
  - Density: 191.4/km^{2} (496/sq mi)
  - Pop 2016–2021: ▲10.7%
  - Dwellings: 6,807
- Time zone: UTC−5 (EST)
  - Summer (DST): UTC−4 (EDT)
- Postal code(s): J5K 1A1
- Area codes: 450 and 579
- Highways: No major routes
- Website: www.st-colomban.qc.ca

Saint-Colomban (French pronunciation: [sɛ̃ kɔlɔ̃bɑ̃]) is a city in the regional county municipality of La Rivière-du-Nord in Québec, Canada. It is situated in the Laurentides region of Québec and was named in honour of Saint Columbanus.

The pioneer responsible for developing the village was the priest John Falvey, who constructed the parish and preached to the first parishioners.

Saint-Colomban was also the birthplace of Mr. Justice Emmett Hall, a justice of the Supreme Court of Canada widely considered to be one of the fathers of Medicare.

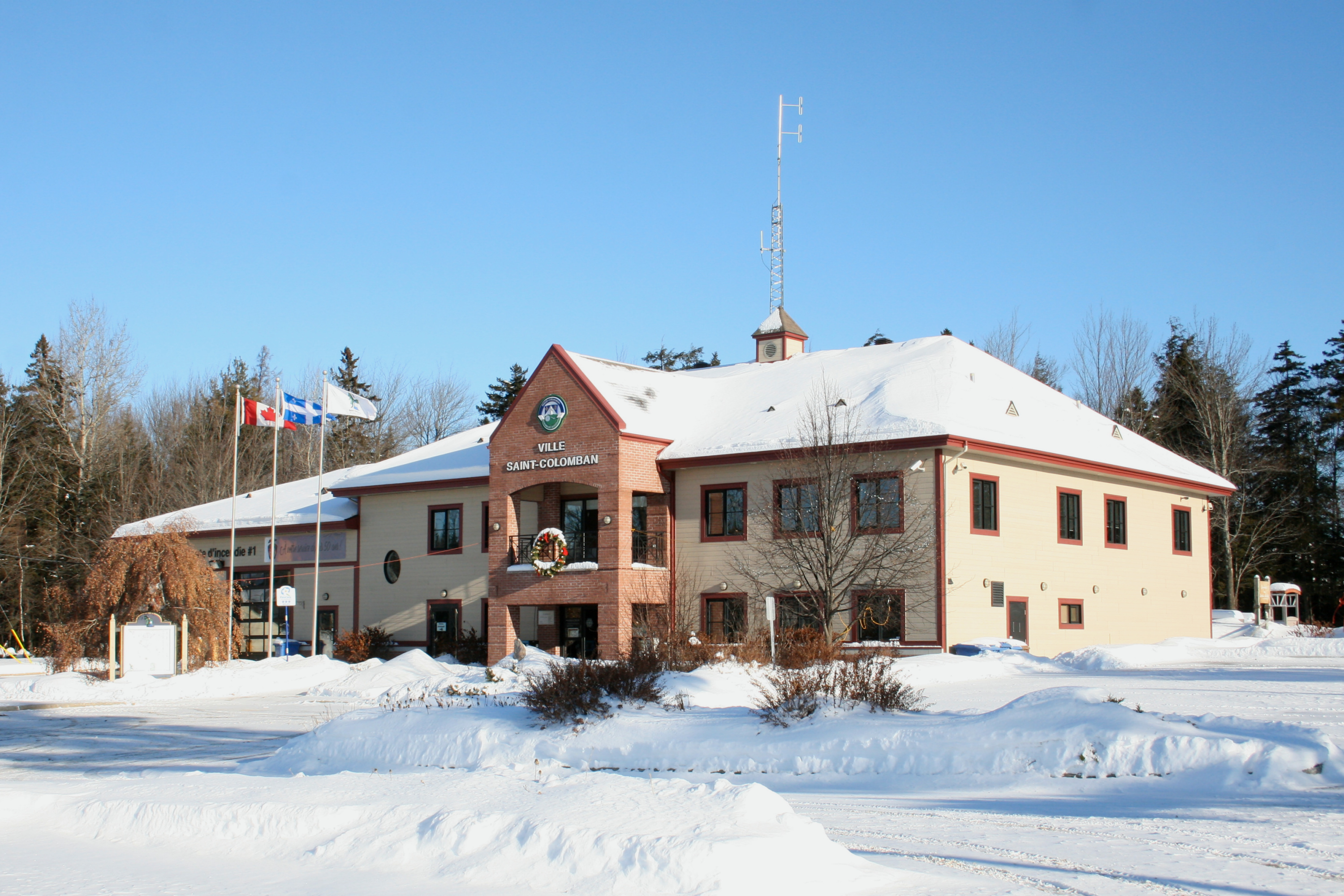
Town hall of St-Colomban

== History ==
The first European settlers arrived in Saint-Colomban in 1819 and the municipality of Saint-Colomban was officially founded in 1855. In 1857, part of Saint-Colomban was amputated to create the municipality of Saint-Canut (now part of Mirabel).

In 2009 Saint-Colomban's status was changed from a parish municipality to a regular municipality. One year later, in 2010, Saint-Colomban gained city status.

== Demographics ==
Historical Census Data – Saint-Colomban, Quebec
Year	Pop.	±%
1861	896	—
1871	676	−24.6%
1881	590	−12.7%
1891	395	−33.1%
1901	324	−18.0%
1911	291	−10.2%
1921	297	+2.1%
1931	243	−18.2%
1941	294	+21.0%
1951	320	+8.8%
1956	298	−6.9%
1961	301	+1.0%
1966	445	+47.8%
1971	1,069	+140.2%
1976	1,762	+64.8%
1981	2,279	+29.3%
1986	2,684	+17.8%
1991	3,638	+35.5%
1996	5,569	+53.1%
2001	7,520	+35.0%
2006	10,136	+34.8%
2011	13,080	+29.0%
2016	16,019	+22.5%
2021	17,740	+10.7%

In the 2021 Census of Population conducted by Statistics Canada, Saint-Colomban had a population of 17,740 living in 6,632 of its 6,807 total private dwellings, a change of 10.7% from its 2016 population of 16,019. With a land area of 92.71 km^{2} (35.80 sq mi), it had a population density of 191.3/km^{2} (495.6/sq mi) in 2021.

Canada census – Saint-Colomban community profile

	2021	2016
Population	17,740 (+10.7% from 2016)	16,019 (+22.5% from 2011)
Land area	92.71 km^{2} (35.80 sq mi)	93.87 km^{2} (36.24 sq mi)
Population density	191.4/km^{2} (496/sq mi)	170.6/km^{2} (442/sq mi)
Median age	38.0 (M: 38.0, F: 38.0)	36.7 (M: 37.3, F: 36.0)
Private dwellings	6,807 (total)	6,200 (total)
Median household income	$100,000	$81,141

References: 2021 2016

== Education ==
The Commission scolaire de la Rivière-du-Nord operates French-language public schools.

- École à l'Orée-des-Bois
- École de la Volière
- École des Hautbois
- École Mer-et-Monde
- The primary schools Bellefeuille and Prévost in Saint-Jérôme serve other sections
- École secondaire Émilien-Frenette and École polyvalente Saint-Jérôme, both in Saint-Jérôme

The Sir Wilfrid Laurier School Board operates English-language public schools:

- Laurentian Elementary School in Lachute
- Laurentian Regional High School in Lachute

== Sources ==
- (in French) Répertoire des municipalités du Québec
- (in French) Commission de toponymie du Québec
- (in French) Affaires municipales et régions - cartes régionales
