= Saint-Jérôme =

- City
- Ville de Saint-Jérôme
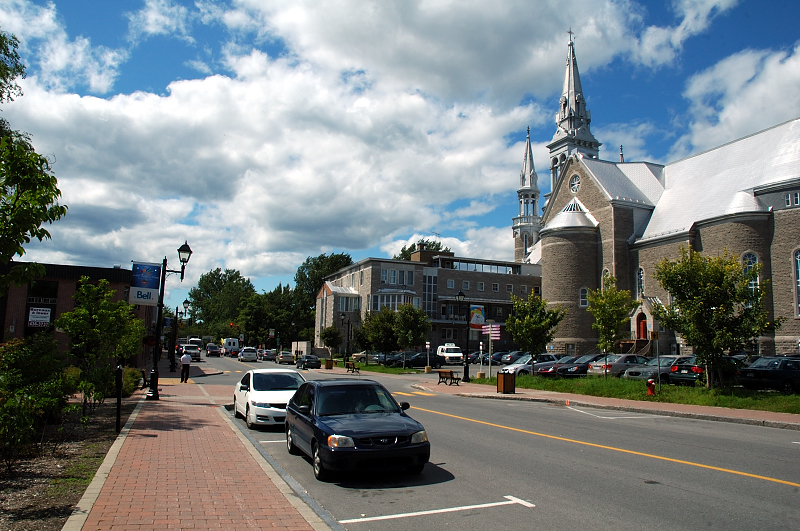
- Downtown Saint-Jérôme

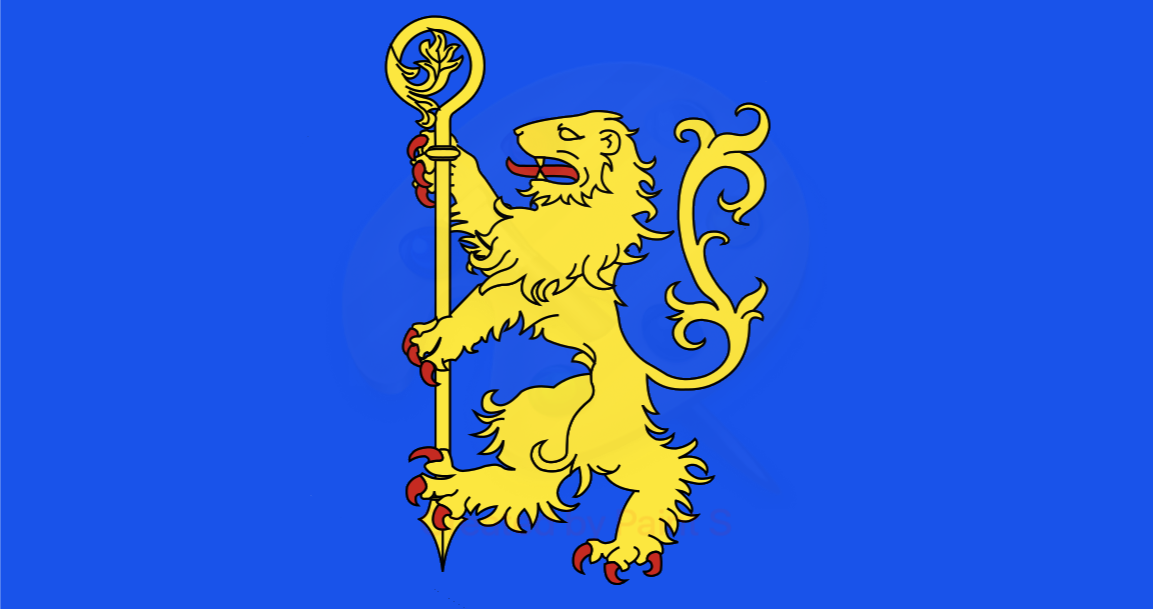
- Flag Coat of arms
- Motto: Par notre volonté
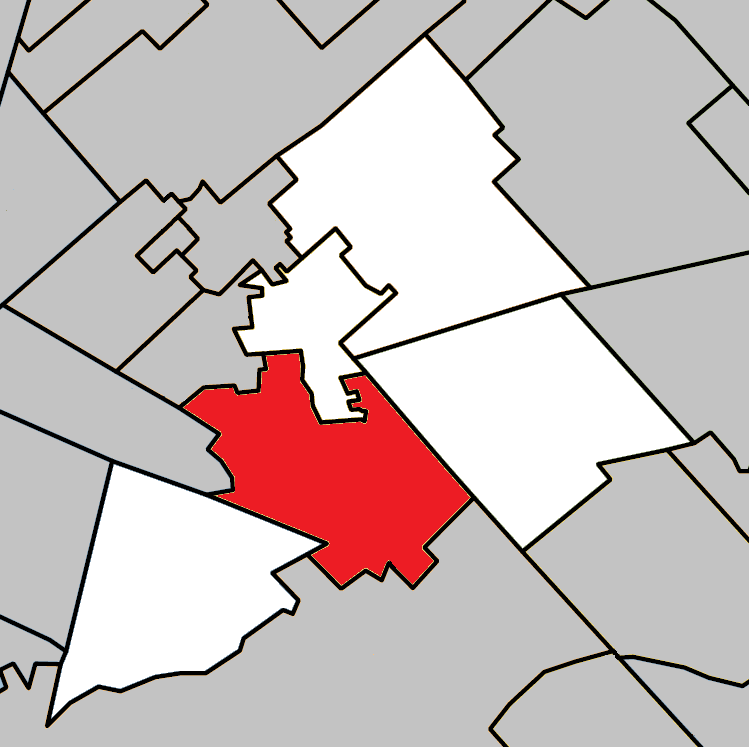
- Location within La Rivière-du-Nord RCM.

- Location in central Quebec.
- Coordinates: 45°47′N 74°00′W
- Country: Canada
- Province: Quebec
- Region: Laurentides
- RCM: La Rivière-du-Nord
- Settled: 1834
- Constituted: January 1, 2002

Government
  - Type: Saint-Jérôme City Council
  - Mayor: Rémi Barbeau
  - Federal riding: Rivière-du-Nord
  - Prov. riding: Saint-Jérôme

Area
  - City: 92.90 km^{2} (35.87 sq mi)
  - Land: 90.18 km^{2} (34.82 sq mi)
  - Urban: 96.97 km^{2} (37.44 sq mi)

Population (2021)
  - City: 80,213
  - Density: 889.5/km^{2} (2,304/sq mi)
  - Urban: 100,859
  - Urban density: 1,040.1/km^{2} (2,694/sq mi)
  - Pop 2016-2021: ▲7.9%
  - Dwellings: 38,776
- Time zone: UTC−5 (EST)
  - Summer (DST): UTC−4 (EDT)
- Postal code(s): J5L, J7Y, J7Z
- Area codes: 450 and 579
- Highways A-15 (TCH): R-117; R-158; R-333
- Website: www.vsj.ca

Saint-Jérôme (French pronunciation: [sɛ̃ ʒeʁom]) (2021 population 80,213) is a suburban city located about 45 kilometres (28 mi) northwest of Montreal on the Rivière du Nord. It is part of the North Shore sector of Greater Montreal. It is a gateway to the Laurentian Mountains and its resorts via the Autoroute des Laurentides.

The town is named after Saint Jerome (ca. 347 – September 30, 420), a Church Father best known as the translator of the Bible from Greek and Hebrew into Latin. His translation is known as the Vulgate.

== History ==
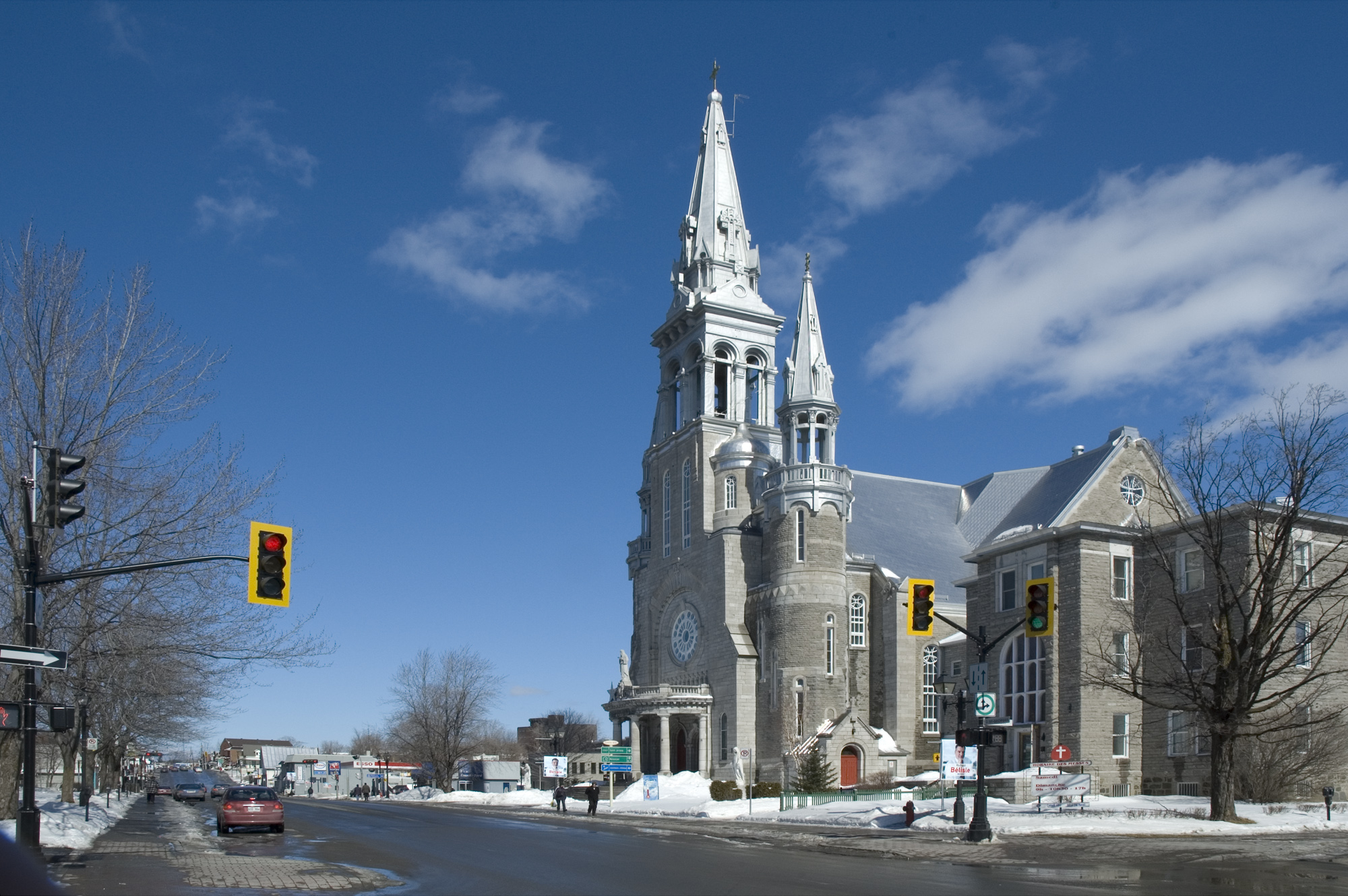
Cathedral of Saint-Jérôme, Québec, Canada

The territory where the present city of Saint-Jérôme now stands was granted in 1752 by the marquis de la Jonquière, governor of New France, as the seignory of Augmentation des Mille-Iles (literally "enlargement" of the seignory of Mille-Iles). From the 1760s to the 1840s, the seignory was owned by the Dumont and Lefebvre de Bellefeuille families, living in the town of Saint-Eustache, 25 kilometres (16 mi) to the south. The Dumont and the Lefebvre conceded the farmland to colonists coming mostly from the region lying north of Montreal. The emerging town was then known under the name of Dumontville. The Catholic parish of Saint-Jérôme was constituted on November 15, 1834, and the village was constituted on July 1, 1845, by governor Metcalfe.

François-Xavier-Antoine Labelle, a Roman Catholic priest who was the great "colonizer" (promoter of settlement) of the North of Montreal, was in charge of the pastoral administration of Saint-Jérôme in 1868 until his death, in 1891. Eight years after his arrival, he had a railway built linking Saint-Jérôme and Montreal.

Antoine Labelle was the parish priest of Saint-Jérôme for 22 years, from 1868 until his death, at 57 years of age, on January 4, 1891. He was called "the king of North, the apostle of colonization".

The opening of roads and the arrival of a railway became essential with the development of the small communities in the Laurentians. These transportation routes for the movement of goods and people would ensure the establishment of trade and industry.

Labelle promoted the idea of a railway towards the North beginning in 1869. The railway reached Saint-Jérôme in 1876, partly because a railway was seen as a way to meet the needs for firewood and construction materials for urban centres like Montreal and Quebec.

In 2002, Saint-Jérôme was amalgamated with the municipalities of Bellefeuille (2006 census population 15,866), Saint-Antoine (2001 population 11,488) and Lafontaine (2001 population 9,477).

Saint-Jérôme is the seat of the judicial district of Terrebonne.

== Geography ==
=== Climate ===
Saint-Jérôme has a humid continental climate (Dfb) with warm, rainy summers and cold, snowy winters.

Climate data for Saint-Jérôme (1981−2010)
Month	Jan	Feb	Mar	Apr	May	Jun	Jul	Aug	Sep	Oct	Nov	Dec	Year
Record high °C (°F)	11.5 (52.7)	12.0 (53.6)	23.9 (75.0)	31.0 (87.8)	34.0 (93.2)	35.6 (96.1)	35.6 (96.1)	35.6 (96.1)	33.0 (91.4)	28.3 (82.9)	22.2 (72.0)	20.0 (68.0)	35.6 (96.1)
Mean daily maximum °C (°F)	−6.3 (20.7)	−3.7 (25.3)	1.8 (35.2)	10.5 (50.9)	18.2 (64.8)	23.2 (73.8)	25.6 (78.1)	24.5 (76.1)	19.4 (66.9)	11.7 (53.1)	4.4 (39.9)	−2.5 (27.5)	10.6 (51.1)
Daily mean °C (°F)	−11.4 (11.5)	−9 (16)	−3.3 (26.1)	0.0 (32.0)	12.4 (54.3)	17.5 (63.5)	20.1 (68.2)	18.9 (66.0)	14.2 (57.6)	7.1 (44.8)	0.7 (33.3)	−6.9 (19.6)	6.4 (43.5)
Mean daily minimum °C (°F)	−16.4 (2.5)	−14.2 (6.4)	−8.3 (17.1)	−5.3 (22.5)	6.5 (43.7)	11.8 (53.2)	14.5 (58.1)	13.4 (56.1)	8.8 (47.8)	2.5 (36.5)	−3.1 (26.4)	−11.2 (11.8)	0.4 (32.7)
Record low °C (°F)	−41.7 (−43.1)	−41.1 (−42.0)	−32.8 (−27.0)	−21.7 (−7.1)	−8.3 (17.1)	−1.7 (28.9)	2.8 (37.0)	0.0 (32.0)	−5.6 (21.9)	−11.7 (10.9)	−26.1 (−15.0)	−40 (−40)	−41.7 (−43.1)
Average precipitation mm (inches)	73.6 (2.90)	59.4 (2.34)	64.4 (2.54)	91.8 (3.61)	92.8 (3.65)	114.0 (4.49)	97.6 (3.84)	88.3 (3.48)	99.2 (3.91)	97.6 (3.84)	102.8 (4.05)	67.1 (2.64)	1,048.7 (41.29)
Average rainfall mm (inches)	23.8 (0.94)	21.9 (0.86)	31.5 (1.24)	86.9 (3.42)	92.8 (3.65)	114.0 (4.49)	97.6 (3.84)	88.3 (3.48)	99.2 (3.91)	96.3 (3.79)	86.4 (3.40)	25.9 (1.02)	864.7 (34.04)
Average snowfall cm (inches)	49.9 (19.6)	37.5 (14.8)	32.9 (13.0)	4.8 (1.9)	0.0 (0.0)	0.0 (0.0)	0.0 (0.0)	0.0 (0.0)	0.0 (0.0)	1.3 (0.5)	16.4 (6.5)	41.2 (16.2)	184.1 (72.5)
Average precipitation days (≥ 0.2 mm)	11.5	8.8	9.6	11.7	12.9	14.1	12.4	11.9	12.7	13.7	13.3	11.1	143.7
Average rainy days (≥ 0.2 mm)	2.0	2.6	4.8	10.9	12.8	14.1	12.4	11.9	12.7	13.4	10.7	3.1	111.3
Average snowy days (≥ 0.2 cm)	10.0	6.6	4.8	1.1	0.0	0.0	0.0	0.0	0.0	0.4	3.1	8.3	34.4
Source: Environment Canada

== Demographics ==
Historical population
Year	Pop.	±% p.a.
1861	705	—
1871	1,159	+5.10%
1881	2,032	+5.78%
1891	2,868	+3.51%
1901	3,619	+2.35%
1911	3,473	−0.41%
1921	5,491	+4.69%
1931	8,967	+5.03%
1941	11,329	+2.37%
1951	17,685	+4.55%
1956	20,645	+3.14%
1961	24,546	+3.52%
1966	26,511	+1.55%
1971	26,524	+0.01%
1976	25,175	−1.04%
1981	25,119	−0.04%
1986	23,316	−1.48%
1991	23,384	+0.06%
1996	23,916	+0.45%
2001	24,583	+0.55%
2006	63,729	+20.99%
2011	68,456	+1.44%
2016	74,346	+1.66%
2021	80,213	+1.53%
Source: Statistics Canada

In the 2021 Census of Population conducted by Statistics Canada, Saint-Jérôme had a population of 80,213 living in 37,371 of its 38,776 total private dwellings, a change of 7.9% from its 2016 population of 74,346. With a land area of 90.18 km^{2} (34.82 sq mi), it had a population density of 889.5/km^{2} (2,303.7/sq mi) in 2021.

=== Race and ethnicity ===
In 2021, Saint-Jérôme was 91.8% White/European, 6.4% visible minorities and 1.8% Indigenous. The largest visible minority groups were Black (3.2%), Latin American (1.3%) and Arab (1.0%). Therefore, Saint-Jérôme is mostly made up of European descents. As of the 2021 census the racial make up of Saint-Jérôme is:

Panethnic groups in the City of Saint-Jérôme (2001−2021)
Panethnic group	2021		2016		2011		2006		2001	
Panethnic group	Pop.	%	Pop.	%	Pop.	%	Pop.	%	Pop.	%
European (Note: Statistic includes all persons that did not make up part of a visible minority or an indigenous identity.)	71,535	91.85%	67,520	94.8%	64,270	96.64%	60,910	97.36%	23,290	98.6%
African	2,475	3.18%	835	1.17%	410	0.62%	265	0.42%	70	0.3%
Indigenous	1,385	1.78%	1,180	1.66%	685	1.03%	435	0.7%	190	0.8%
Latin American	1,005	1.29%	740	1.04%	570	0.86%	495	0.79%	15	0.06%
Middle Eastern (Note: Statistic includes total responses of "West Asian" and "Arab" under visible minority section on census.)	785	1.01%	410	0.58%	125	0.19%	80	0.13%	30	0.13%
Southeast Asian (Note: Statistic includes total responses of "Filipino" and "Southeast Asian" under visible minority section on census.)	260	0.33%	195	0.27%	50	0.08%	95	0.15%	0	0%
East Asian (Note: Statistic includes total responses of "Chinese", "Korean", and "Japanese" under visible minority section on census.)	160	0.21%	175	0.25%	130	0.2%	195	0.31%	10	0.04%
South Asian	95	0.12%	140	0.2%	180	0.27%	35	0.06%	20	0.08%
Other/multiracial (Note: Statistic includes total responses of "Visible minority, n.i.e." and "Multiple visible minorities" under visible minority section on census.)	190	0.24%	45	0.06%	95	0.14%	50	0.08%	10	0.04%
Total responses	77,880	97.09%	71,225	95.8%	66,505	97.15%	62,560	98.17%	23,620	96.08%
Total population	80,213	100%	74,346	100%	68,456	100%	63,729	100%	24,583	100%
Note: Totals greater than 100% due to multiple origin responses

=== Religion ===
66.1% of residents were Christian in 2021, down from 88.1% in 2011. 59.0% were Catholic, 4.5% were Christian n.o.s, 0.5% were Protestant, and 2.0% belonged to other Christian denominations or Christian-related traditions. 31.3% of the population was non-religious or secular, up from 11.1% in 2011. Other religions and spiritual traditions accounted for 2.6% of the population, up from 0.8% in 2011. The largest non-Christian religion was Islam (1.9%). According to the 2021 census, religious groups in Saint-Jérôme included:

- Christianity (51,465 persons or 66.1%)
  - Catholic (45,960 persons or 59.0%)
  - Christian, not otherwise specified (3,495 persons or 4.5%)
  - Other (1,985 persons or 2.5%)
- No religion and secular perspectives (24,215 persons or 31.3%)
- Islam (1,475 persons or 1.9%)
- Buddhism (180 persons or 0.2%)
- Judaism (35 persons or <0.1%)
- Hinduism (25 persons or <0.1%)
- Other (280 persons or 0.4%)

=== Language ===
French is the mother tongue of 92.3% of the population. The next most common first languages are English (1.6%), Spanish (1.4%), and Arabic (0.7%). 1.2% of residents listed both French and English as mother tongues, while 0.6% listed both French and a non-official language.

Canada Census Mother Tongue - St-Jerome, Quebec
Census	Total	French			English			French & English			Other		
Year	Responses	Count	Trend	Pop %	Count	Trend	Pop %	Count	Trend	Pop %	Count	Trend	Pop %
2021	79,065	72,975	▲6.18%	92.3%	1,290	▲18.35%	1.6%	915	▲88.66%	1.2%	3,270	▲45.33%	4.1%
2016	74,346	68,725	▲6.72%	92.4%	1,090	▲8.45%	1.5%	485	▲32.87%	0.7%	2,250	▲31.57%	3.0%
2011	67,675	64,395	▲7.68%	95.2%	1,005	▲17.54%	1.6%	365	▲15.88%	0.5%	1,710	▲7.55%	2.5%
2006	62,560	59,800	▲6.06%	95.6%	855	▲20.42%	1.4%	315	▼5.9%	0.5%	1,590	▲120.8%	2.5%
2001	58,150	56,385	▲4.55%	97.0%	710	▼10.69%	1.2%	335	▼9.45%	0.6%	720	▲29.72%	1.2%
1996	55,630	53,930	n/a	97.2%	795	n/a	1.4%	370	n/a	0.7%	555	n/a	1.0%

Mother Tongue	Population	Percentage
French	72,975	92.3%
English	1,290	1.6%
English and French	915	1.2%
French and a non-official language	440	0.6%
English, French and a non-official language	90	0.1%
English and a non-official language	70	0.1%
Spanish	1,095	1.4%
Arabic	535	0.7%
Italian	130	0.2%
Haitian Creole	115	0.1%
Portuguese	105	0.1%
Russian	100	0.1%
Albanian	95	0.1%
Romanian	90	0.1%
Nepali	85	0.1%
Mandarin	55	0.1%
Kabyle	45	0.1%
Greek	40	0.1%
Swahili	40	0.1%

== Economy ==
=== Industry ===
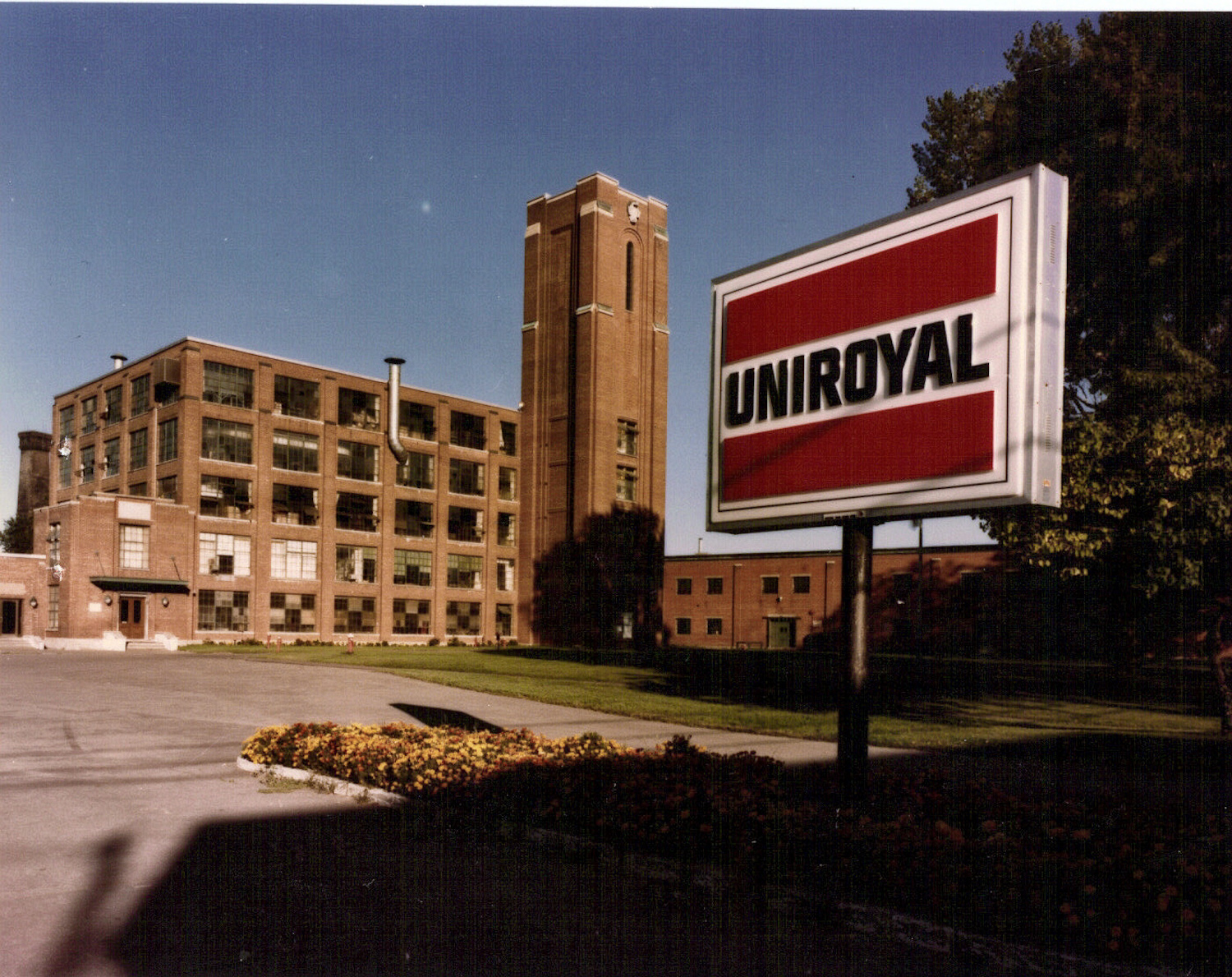
Uniroyal plant, built 1911–1930

==== Uniroyal, Dominion Rubber ====
- In 1911, the first rubber industry in Saint-Jérôme, shoe production
- In 1926, the industry is renamed Dominion Rubber.
- In the 1950s, 37,000 shoes were produced for all over the world.
- In 1966, the company is renamed UNIROYAL LTD.
- In 1968, the company changed its production for automobile parts, crashpad.
- In 1981, the company was sold to many cities like Woodbridge and Waterville.
- In 1994 the building was demolished.

== Attractions ==
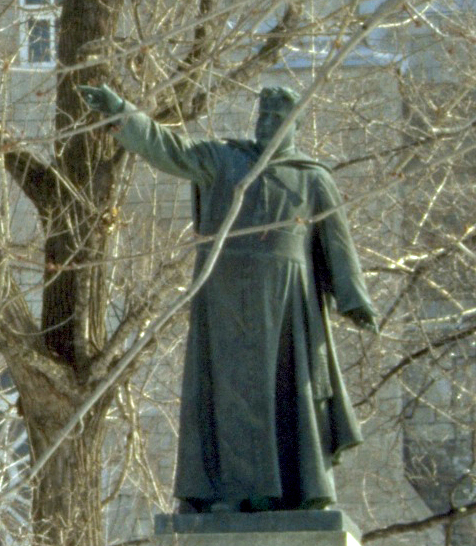
Priest Labelle statue.

- Roman Catholic cathedral, which includes a small museum
- Vieux-Palais modern art museum and public library
- Musée d'art contemporain des Laurentides
- Statue of Antoine Labelle, known as curé Labelle, who was principally responsible for the settlement of the Laurentians
- Several summer festivals
- Carrefour du Nord, a regional shopping mall
- Melançon Arena, an indoor arena

== Sports ==
Saint-Jérôme hosted the Quebec Games in winter 1987, which enabled it, among other things, to add bleachers to the physical education and sports recreation centre (CREPS) at École polyvalente Saint-Jérôme, now the city's largest sports centre. In April 2007 and 2014, Saint-Jérôme hosted the Fred Page Cup championship, the junior hockey final for Eastern Canada, which brings together the champions of the Maritimes, Quebec and Ontario, in addition to the host team. Since 2017, it has hosted the P'tit Train du Nord Marathon. Saint-Jérôme once had a semi-professional hockey team for a few seasons. The team was called the Pétroliers du Nord and was very popular with fans of high-calibre hockey, as well as rough play and fights. The city of Saint-Jérôme did not want to keep this team in its Rivière du Nord arena, so they moved to Laval. Now there is also a junior AAA hockey team, the Panthères de Saint-Jérôme. This team is often one of the powerhouses of the league and therefore attracts many spectators.

The Saint-Jérôme Panthers are a junior AAA hockey team that was founded in 1990–1991, when the Laval-Laurentides region hosted this franchise. Since then, the Panthers first played in Saint-Antoine before moving to the Melançon Arena and finally, in 2016, settling at the Rivière-du-Nord Arena, where they play today. Since December 2018, the Rivière-du-Nord Arena has been home to the Pétroliers du Nord team of the Ligue Nord-Américaine de Hockey (LNAH). However, the team moved to the Colisée de Laval for the 2019–2020 season.

Built in 1952, the Melançon Arena has hosted a variety of events over the years, including wrestling and boxing galas, circus performances, motocross and skating competitions, as well as the exploits of the Saint-Jérôme Alouettes of the Quebec Major Junior Hockey League. Older residents will also remember the visits of the Quebec Remparts, with figures such as Guy Lafleur, Jacques Richard and André Savard, as well as the Quebec Games held in 1987. Mayor Marc Bourcier expressed his sadness at the closure, noting that, for reasons of safety and suitability for current and future needs, the municipality had no choice but to permanently close the building. Although the City of Saint-Jérôme secured the building's structure in 2022 to allow activities to continue temporarily, major repairs are still needed to bring the building up to standard, including repairs to the roof, which was severely damaged during a period of high winds in May 2022. The estimated cost of $10.5 million to maintain the integrity of the building, not including high operating costs, prompted the municipality to consider closure as the best option. According to Mr. Bourcier, a complete renovation to give the arena a new lease on life would require an investment of over $45 million. The City emphasised its duty to respect taxpayers' ability to pay and decided that closing the building was the most sensible decision at this time. The mayor pointed out that although the Melançon Arena had reached the end of its useful life, it had proudly served the people of Saint-Jérôme for 70 years.

The sports teams at Cégep de Saint-Jérôme, known as the Cheminots, are among the elite of college sports in Quebec. In particular, the AA women's hockey team dominated the league, winning the championship in 2003, 2004, 2005, and 2006, before losing by one point to Dawson College in 2007. During this period, the team also won the Polar Bear Tournament, an international tournament held in Connecticut, United States, twice.

The Multisports Park is located at the end of Fillion Street and Ouimet Street, across from the Rivière-du-Nord Arena and near the École polyvalente Saint-Jérôme. In 2013, the first synthetic soccer and football fields were inaugurated.

Located at the end of Fillion Street, across from Multispors Park, the Rivière-du-Nord Arena was funded by the cities of Saint-Jérôme, Sainte-Sophie, and Prévost. Inaugurated on 27 February 2016, it has hosted the St-Jérôme Panthers hockey team since autumn 2016, as well as the Saint-Jérôme Lions, the municipality's junior team. The arena is managed by the Régie intermunicipale de l'aréna Rivière-du-Nord, which brings together the cities of Prévost, Sainte-Sophie and Saint-Jérôme.

== Government ==
The city council (in French: Conseil municipal de Saint-Jérôme) is the governing body of the city. The council consists of the mayor and 12 councillors.

Members as of 2025:

- Rémi Barbeau, mayor
- Éric Monette, District 1 councillor
- Pascal St-Onge, District 2 councillor
- Jacques Bouchard, District 3 councillor
- Joanie Mathieu, District 4 councillor
- Jessica Desrochers Lauzon, District 5 councillor
- Isabelle L’Heureux-Leblanc, District 6 councillor
- Sonia Goulet, District 7 councillor
- Marc-Antoine Lachance, District 8 councillor
- Paula Gonzalves, District 9 councillor
- Frédérik Clément, District 10 councillor
- Simon Marcil, District 11 councillor
- Marie-Claude Poitras, District 12 councillor

== Infrastructure ==
=== Transportation ===
==== Road ====
Saint-Jérôme is served by Québec Autoroute 15, which is part of the Trans-Canada Highway system, and Québec Route 117. In addition, Québec Routes 158 and 333 pass through the city.

==== Public transportation ====
===== Train =====
Saint-Jérôme is served by the Saint-Jérôme intermodal commuter rail station by Exo, the Greater Montreal Region's public transit system's Saint-Jérôme line (Line 12). Commuter trains to Montreal began to serve the station in January 2007, with four trains in each direction each business day.

Since upgrades to the line were made in 2013, which included work to double the track between Sainte-Rose station and Saint-Martin Junction and install Automatic Train Control (ATC) between Parc station and the end of the line in Saint-Jérôme, all trains now serve the station. There are 13 departures towards Montreal during the week, and six departures on the weekends and holidays.

===== Bus =====
The station is also served by bus routes operated by Exo, the neighbouring transit agency Transport MRC de Joliette, as well as three private intercity bus companies.

==== Trails ====
Saint-Jérôme is an important stop on the north–south trunk of the "route verte" cycling path which makes it possible for nature lovers who are also pedaling enthusiasts to make short trips or excursions lasting several days from as far south as Blainville on the outskirts of Montreal and as far north as Mont-Tremblant without ever sharing the road with a motorized vehicle. North of Saint-Jérôme, the trail is known as the "P'tit Train du Nord" linear park (rail trail) and is also used as a cross-country ski trail in winter.

=== Health ===
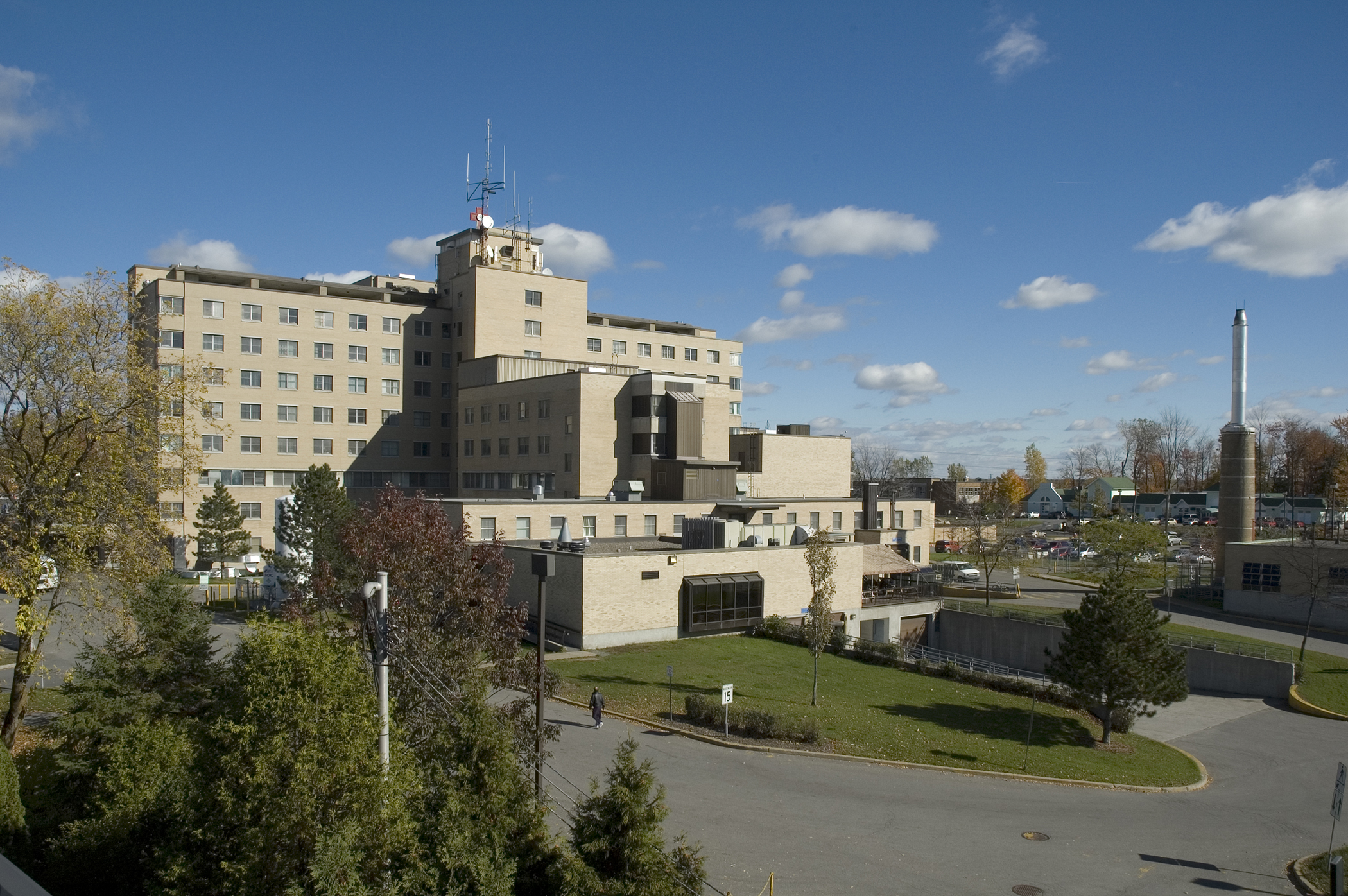
Saint-Jérôme Hospital, Health Centre (Quebec, Canada)

==== Institutional health care ====
The Centre de santé et de services sociaux de Saint-Jérôme (Health and Social Services Centre of Saint-Jérôme or CSSS) is the non-profit body that operates three different types of a health care institution in the city: an acute-care hospital (the Hôpital régional de Saint-Jérôme), the CLSC and long-term care facilities. By its regional vocation, it serves the entire Laurentides region. The history of the CSSS of Saint-Jérôme begins with the construction of the hospital in 1949 and its opening the following year.

In April 2007, the CSSS obtained accreditation from Accreditation Canada. This distinction confirms adequate standards of care and patient safety.

== Education ==
Saint-Jérôme is home to the Cégep de Saint-Jérôme, one of the Colleges of General and Vocational Education located in the province. It is also home to a new Saint-Jérôme branch campus of the Université du Québec en Outaouais.

The Commission scolaire de la Rivière-du-Nord operates French-language public schools. Secondary schools in the community operated by this school district include:

- École secondaire Cap-Jeunesse
- École secondaire des Hauts-Sommets
- École secondaire des-Studios
- École polyvalente Saint-Jérôme
- École secondaire Frenette
- École secondaire Saint-Stanislas

Sir Wilfrid Laurier School Board operates English-language public schools. Schools serving the town:

- Laurentian Elementary School in Saint-Jérôme
- Laurentian Regional High School in Lachute

== Sister cities ==
- Lisieux, France - since May 2010?

== Notable people ==
- Françoise Aubut, Concert organist
- Julie Baumann, Athlete
- Jacques Beauchamp, Sports journalist
- Émily Bégin, Singer
- Francis Bélanger, Professional hockey player
- Jean-François Bergeron, Professional boxer
- Roxanne Bouchard, Writer
- Marc Bourcier, Politician
- Léo Cadieux, Politician
- Martin Camirand, Politician
- Tod Campeau, Professional hockey player
- Brett Carpentier, Snowboarder
- Benoit Charette, Politician
- Alain Côté, Fencer
- Luc Cyr, Prelate
- Paul-Émilien Dalpé, Labour unionist
- Yann Danis, Professional hockey player
- Pierre Daviault, Translator
- Antonia David, Arts administrator
- Marcel Deschambault, Politician
- Luc Desnoyers, Trade unionist
- Phil Devey, Professional baseball player
- Pierre Dionne Labelle, Politician
- Maurice Dupras, Politician
- Olivier Durocher, Mayor of Ottawa
- Éliane Excoffier, Photographer
- Benoît Gauthier, Slalom canoeist
- David Goyette, Professional hockey player
- Germaine Guèvremont, Writer
- Jonathan Huberdeau, Professional hockey player
- Joseph-Octave Latour, Politician
- Kelly Ann Laurin, Pair skater
- Michel Laurin, Vertebrate paleontologist
- Patrick Lebeau, Professional hockey player
- Stéphan Lebeau, Professional hockey player
- Guillaume Lemay-Thivierge, Actor
- François Letourneau, Slalom canoeist
- Little Beaver, Wrestler
- Jacques Locas, Professional hockey player
- Yves Locas, Professional hockey player
- François Martineau, Politician
- Mike McKay, Professional hockey player
- Denis Michaud, Luger
- Marc Nadon, Supreme Court nominee
- Guillaume-Alphonse Nantel, Lawyer
- Wilfrid Bruno Nantel, Politician
- Jules-Édouard Prévost, Politician
- Jérôme Proulx, Politician
- Édouard Rinfret, Lawyer
- Gilles Robert, Politician
- Gédéon Rochon, Lawyer
- Gilles Taillon, Leader of the Action démocratique du Québec
- Marc-André Thinel, Professional hockey player
- Sébastien Thinel, Professional hockey player
- Georges Thurston, Singer

== See also ==
- Municipal reorganization in Quebec
- Quebec Gatineau Railway

== Bibliography ==
- Auclair, Elie-J., Saint-Jérôme de Terrebonne , Imprimerie J.H.A. Labelle, 1934, pages 13–35.
