= Laurentides =

- Administrative region
- Coordinates: 46°26′N 74°59′W
- Country: Canada
- Province: Quebec
- Regional County Municipalities (RCM) and Equivalent Territories (ET): 7 RCM, 1 ET: Antoine-Labelle; Argenteuil; Deux-Montagnes; La Rivière-du-Nord; Les Laurentides; Les Pays-d'en-Haut; Thérèse-De Blainville; Mirabel, Quebec (ET)

Government
  - Conseil des préfets et des élus de la région des Laurentides (Regional conference of elected officers): Ramez Ayoub (President)

Area
  - Land: 20,779.19 km^{2} (8,022.89 sq mi)

Population (2021)
  - Total: 631 719
  - Density: 28.4/km^{2} (74/sq mi)
- Demonym: Laurentien(ne)
- Time zone: UTC-5 (EST)
  - Summer (DST): UTC-4 (EDT)
- Postal code: J
- Area code: 450, 579
- Website: www.laurentides.gouv.qc.ca

The Laurentides (French: [loʁɑ̃tid], Canadian French: [lɔʁɑ̃t͡sid]) is a region of Quebec. While it is often called the Laurentians in English, the region includes only part of the Laurentian Mountains. It has a total land area of 20,779.19 km^{2} (8,022.89 sq mi) and its population was 589,400 inhabitants as of the 2016 Census.

The area was historically occupied by the Weskarini Algonquin First Nation. English Canadians began settling in the 1700s in towns like Arundel and Harrington and St. Columban and Clyde, today's La Conception. French Canadians began settlement in the first half of the 19th century, establishing an agricultural presence throughout the valleys. During the 20th century, the area also became a popular tourist destination, based on a cottage and lake culture in the summer, and a downhill and cross-country ski culture in the winter. Ski resorts include Saint-Sauveur and Mont Tremblant.

The Laurentides offer a weekend escape for Montrealers and tourists from New England to Ontario, and with the building of a major highway through the area in the 1970s (Autoroute 15), the area has experienced much growth. Its largest city is Saint-Jérôme, in its extreme southeast, with a 2011 census population of 68,456 inhabitants.

== Administrative divisions ==
=== Regional county municipalities ===
Regional County Municipality (RCM)	Population 2016 Canadian Census	Land Area	Density (pop. per km^{2})	Seat of RCM
Antoine-Labelle	35,243	14,976.99 km^{2} (5,782.65 sq mi)	2.4	Mont-Laurier
Argenteuil	32,389	1,252.97 km^{2} (483.77 sq mi)	25.8	Lachute
Deux-Montagnes	98,203	243.42 km^{2} (93.98 sq mi)	403.4	Saint-Eustache
La Rivière-du-Nord	128,170	451.02 km^{2} (174.14 sq mi)	284.2	Saint-Jérôme
Les Laurentides	45,902	2,479.05 km^{2} (957.17 sq mi)	18.5	Mont-Blanc
Les Pays-d'en-Haut	41,877	683.46 km^{2} (263.89 sq mi)	61.3	Sainte-Adèle
Mirabel (Equivalent Territory)	50,513	485.07 km^{2} (187.29 sq mi)	104.1	Mirabel
Thérèse-De Blainville	157,103	207.20 km^{2} (80.00 sq mi)	758.2	Sainte-Thérèse

=== Indian reserve ===
- Doncaster

=== Indian settlement ===
- Kanesatake

== Major communities ==
- Blainville
- Boisbriand
- Deux-Montagnes
- Lachute
- Mirabel
- Mont-Laurier
- Rosemère
- Saint-Colomban
- Saint-Eustache
- Saint-Jérôme
- Sainte-Anne-des-Plaines
- Sainte-Marthe-sur-le-Lac
- Sainte-Sophie
- Sainte-Thérèse

== See also ==
- List of Quebec regions
