= Wentworth, Quebec =

Wentworth
- Township municipality
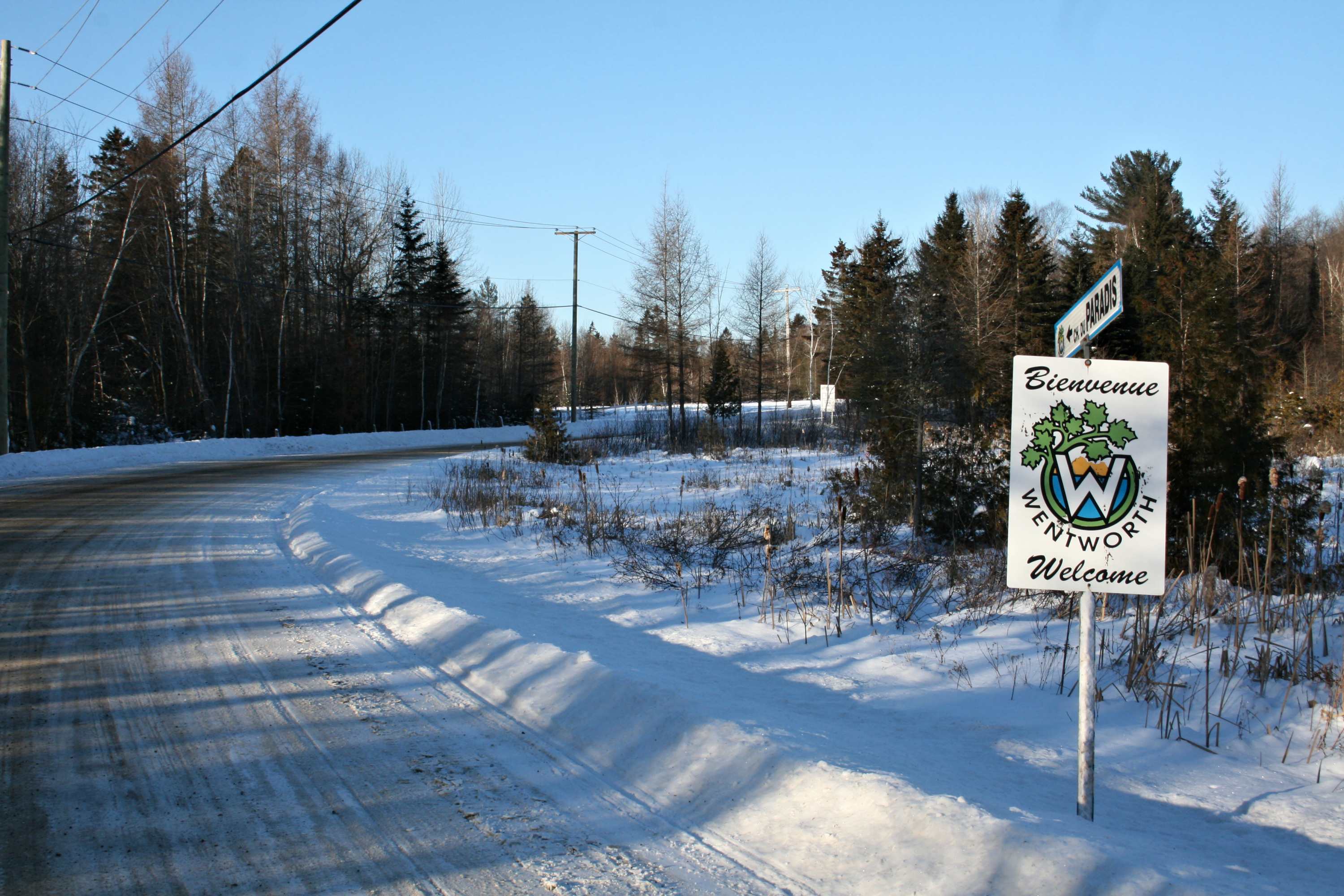

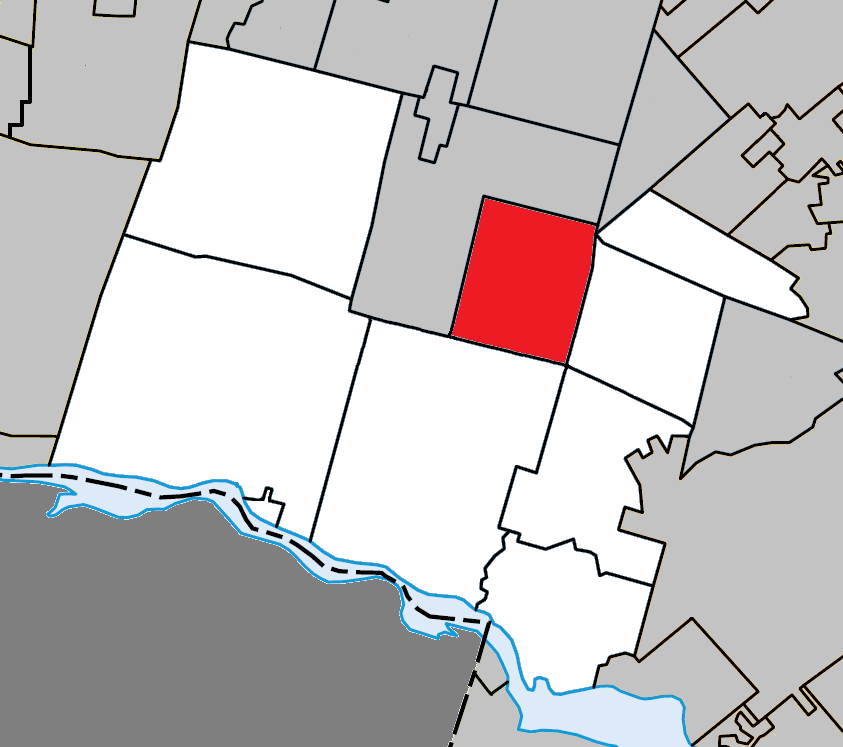
- Location within Argenteuil RCM

- Location in central Quebec
- Coordinates: 45°48′N 74°22′W
- Country: Canada
- Province: Quebec
- Region: Laurentides
- RCM: Argenteuil
- Settled: 1830s
- Constituted: July 1, 1855

Government
  - Mayor: Jason Morrison
  - Federal riding: Les Pays-d'en-Haut
  - Prov. riding: Argenteuil

Area
  - Total: 95.26 km^{2} (36.78 sq mi)
  - Land: 85.03 km^{2} (32.83 sq mi)

Population (2021)
  - Total: 682
  - Density: 8/km^{2} (21/sq mi)
  - Pop (2016-21): ▲28.0%
  - Dwellings: 802
- Time zone: UTC−5 (EST)
  - Summer (DST): UTC−4 (EDT)
- Postal code(s): J8H 0C7
- Area codes: 450 and 579
- Highways: No major routes
- Website: www.wentworth.ca

Wentworth is a township municipality in the Laurentides region of Quebec, Canada, part of the Argenteuil Regional County Municipality, north-west of Lachute.

Its population centres are Louisa (45°45′48″N 74°21′54″W), Lac-Louisa (45°45′53″N 74°24′41″W), and Dunany (45°44′28″N 74°19′49″W).

== History ==
The Gale and Duberger map of 1795 already shows the Wentworth Township, but it was not officially established until 1809. It is unclear if it is named after a village in York County, England, or that it is a tribute to Sir John Wentworth (1737–1820), Lieutenant Governor of Nova Scotia from 1792 to 1808.

Around 1830, a group of settlers composed of Irish and French Canadians, began clearing the rough land with difficulty. In 1845, the Gore Municipality was established, which included the Gore and Wentworth Townships, but it was abolished two years later. In 1855, the Wentworth Township Municipality was formed.

In 1914, a small portion of the Wentworth and Montcalm Townships separated and formed the Municipality of Lac-des-Seize-Îles, and in 1958, Wentworth lost a large chunk of its territory when the Municipality of Wentworth-Nord separated.

== Geography ==
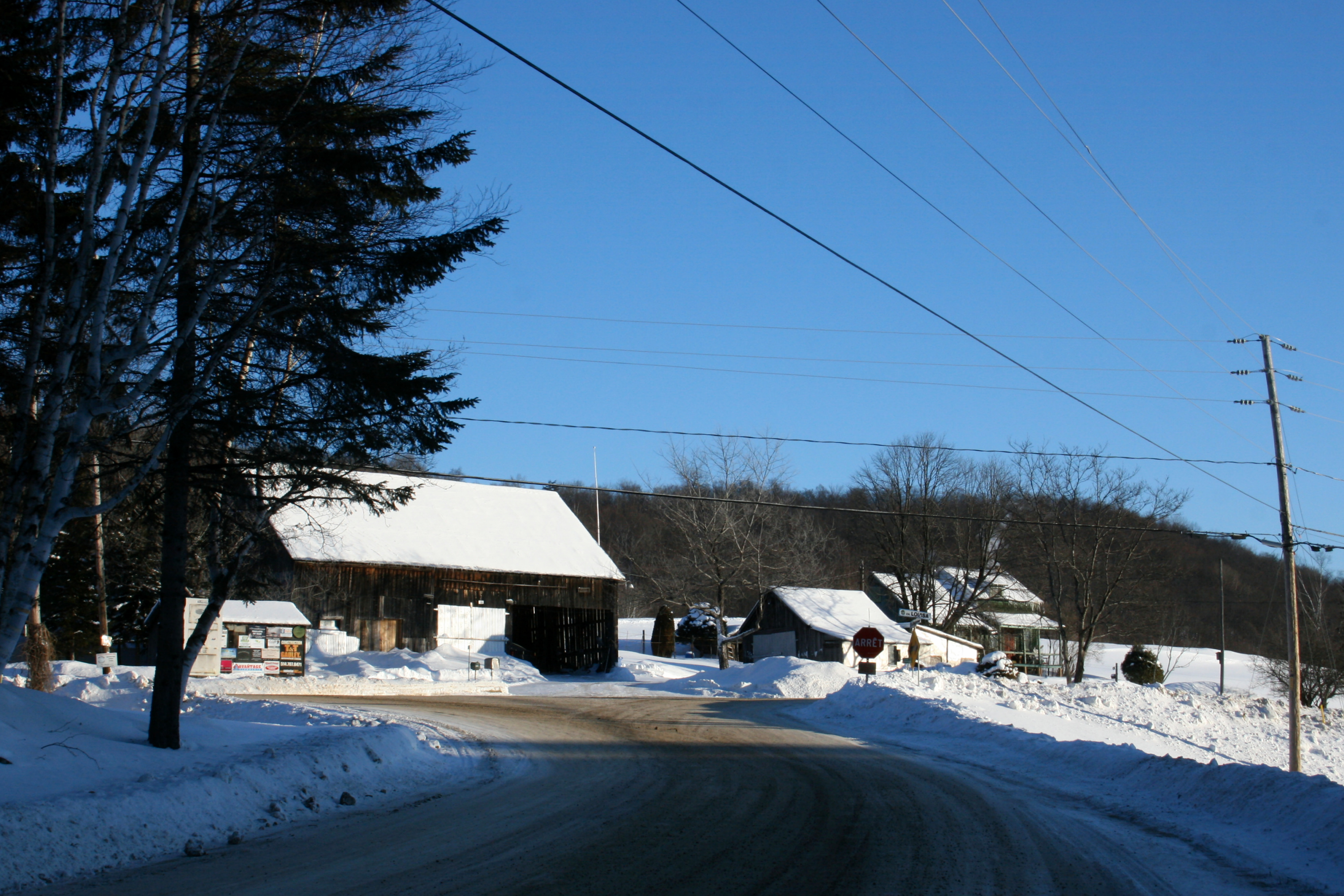
Louisa

The township is in the foothills of the Laurentian Mountains, not exceeding 487 metres (1,598 ft) above sea level, with a rocky, sandy, gravelly soil that is not conducive to agriculture. However, much of the land was cleared by early Irish settlers for farming and there remains small pockets of pastures along the Dalesville River, especially in the Glen and around the town centre. It is dotted with many lakes, such as Curran, Black, McDougall, Rainbow, and most notably Lake Louisa—the largest lake in the Regional County. These lakes attract many cottage vacationers and fishing enthusiasts.

The headwater of the Dalesville River, the largest river in Wentworth, begins at the outlet of Barrows Lake on the western edge of the municipality and meanders for approximately 12 km (7.5 mi) through the municipality.

== Demographics ==
In the 2021 Census of Population conducted by Statistics Canada, Wentworth had a population of 682 living in 378 of its 802 total private dwellings, a change of 28% from its 2016 population of 533. With a land area of 85.03 km^{2} (32.83 sq mi), it had a population density of 8.0/km^{2} (20.8/sq mi) in 2021.

Canada census – Wentworth, Quebec community profile

	2021	2016	2011
Population	682 (+28.0% from 2016)	533 (6.2% from 2011)	502 (3.9% from 2006)
Land area	85.03 km^{2} (32.83 sq mi)	87.69 km^{2} (33.86 sq mi)	87.16 km^{2} (33.65 sq mi)
Population density	8.0/km^{2} (21/sq mi)	6.1/km^{2} (16/sq mi)	5.8/km^{2} (15/sq mi)
Median age	59.6 (M: 60.4, F: 59.2)	56.9 (M: 57.4, F: 56.2)	53.5 (M: 53.9, F: 53.2)
Private dwellings	802 (total) 378 (occupied)	788 (total) 266 (occupied)	754 (total)
Median household income	$73,500	$66,816	$n/a

References: 2021 2016 2011

Historical census populations – Wentworth, Quebec

Year	Pop.	±%
1861	343	—
1871	656	+91.3%
1881	610	−7.0%
1891	898	+47.2%
1901	1,064	+18.5%
1911	855	−19.6%
1921	953	+11.5%
1931	986	+3.5%

Year	Pop.	±%
1941	469	−52.4%
1951	727	+55.0%
1956	432	−40.6%
1961	72	−83.3%
1966	102	+41.7%
1971	146	+43.1%
1976	204	+39.7%
1981	225	+10.3%

Year	Pop.	±%
1986	273	+21.3%
1991	329	+20.5%
1996	379	+15.2%
2001	434	+14.5%
2006	483	+11.3%
2011	502	+3.9%
2016	533	+6.2%
2021	682	+28.0%

Source: Statistics Canada

Mother tongue (2021):

- English as first language: 40.9%
- French as first language: 52.6%
- English and French as first language: 2.2%
- Other as first language: 2.9%

== Government ==
Due to the 2022 Canadian federal electoral redistribution, Wentworth was redistricted to the new riding of Les Pays-d'en-Haut, which is represented by Tim Watchorn of the Liberal Party since 2025. Before that, Wentworth formed part of the federal electoral district of Argenteuil—La Petite-Nation and was represented by Stéphane Lauzon of the Liberal Party between 2015 and 2025. Provincially, Wentworth is part of the Argenteuil electoral district and is represented by Pierre Nantel of the Parti Quebecois since 2026.

Wentworth federal election results
Year	Liberal		Conservative		Bloc Québécois		New Democratic		Green	
2021	45%	217	14%	65	28%	134	9%	44	0%	0
2019	41%	173	15%	63	27%	115	8%	35	7%	30
2015	47%	128	14%	39	18%	50	19%	51	2%	6
2011	26%	66	25%	65	13%	34	31%	80	4%	11
2008	24%	59	47%	118	18%	46	4%	9	8%	19
2006	34%	68	31%	62	20%	40	7%	14	8%	16
2004	59%	131	18%	39	10%	23	2%	5	10%	21

Wentworth provincial election results
Year	CAQ		Liberal		QC solidaire		Parti Québécois	
2026	7%	23	51%	154	3%	10	23%	71
2022	31%	86	32%	89	5%	14	12%	33
2018	23%	76	47%	156	5%	17	13%	45
2014	5%	19	71%	260	1%	5	21%	77
2012	11%	30	65%	174	2%	6	21%	55

List of former mayors:

- George Seale (1882-1903)
- Thomas Morrison (1903-1920)
- Stewart Boyd (1921-1932)
- Leslie Adamson (1932-1941)
- Harvey Barlow (1941-1947)
- Sylvio Deslauriers (1947-1949)
- William Bickerdike (1949-1951)
- Clarence Neill (1951-1979)
- William Murray (1979-1985)
- Edmund Kasprzyk (1985-1997)
- Marcel Raymond (1997–2003)
- Normand Champoux (2003–2009)
- Edmund Kasprzyk (2009–2013)
- Marcel Harvey (2013–2016)
- Jason Morrison (2016–present)

In November 2025, Mayor Morrison was elected assistant Warden for the MRC d'Argenteuil. He is the first mayor of Wentworth to hold this position since the creation of the MRC in 1983.

== Education ==
The Commission scolaire de la Rivière-du-Nord operates French-language public schools.

- École polyvalente Lavigne in Lachute

The Sir Wilfrid Laurier School Board operates English-language public schools:

- Laurentian Elementary School in Lachute
- Laurentian Regional High School in Lachute

== See also ==
- List of anglophone communities in Quebec
- List of township municipalities in Quebec
