= Lac-des-Seize-Îles =

- Municipality
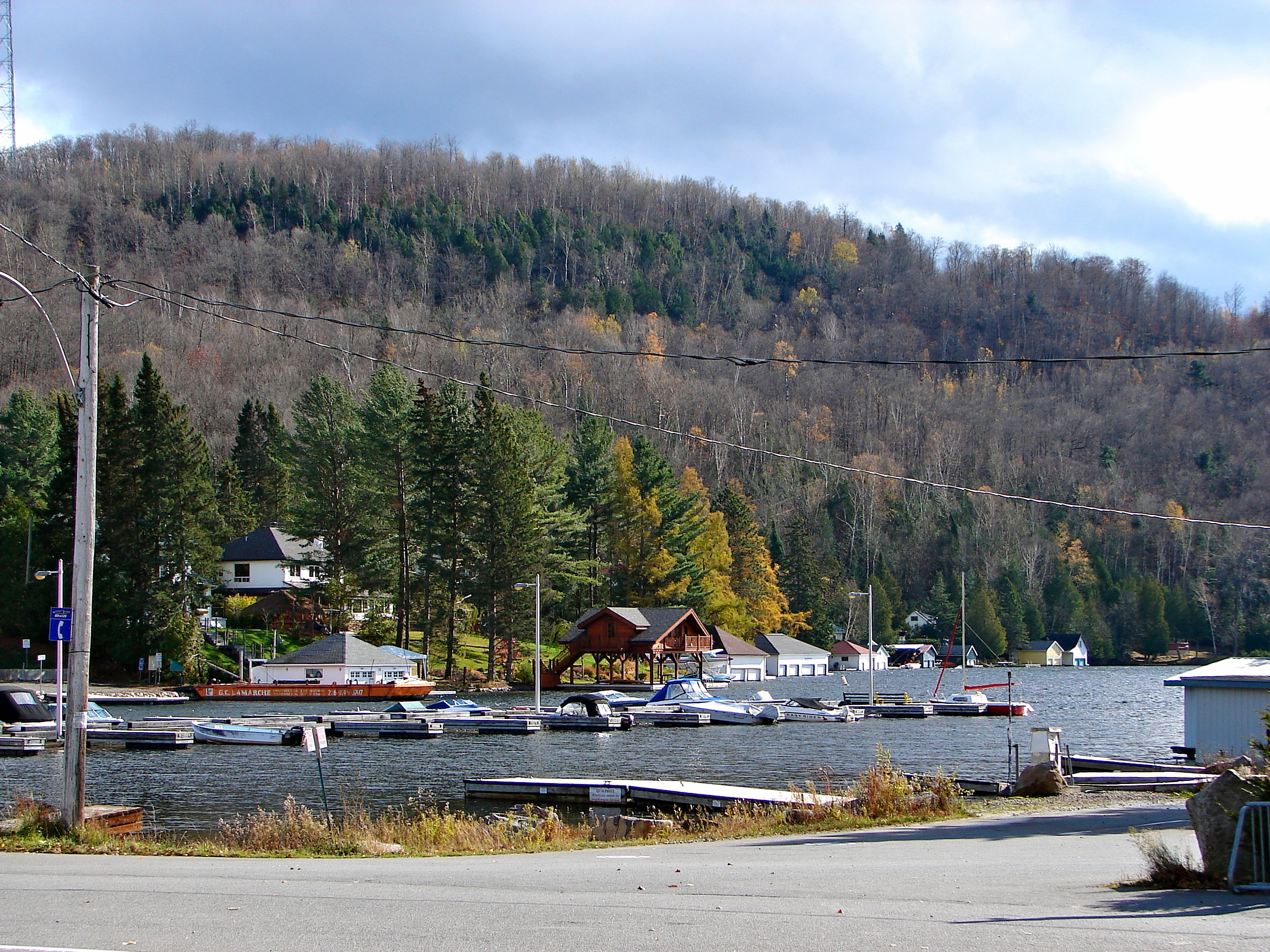

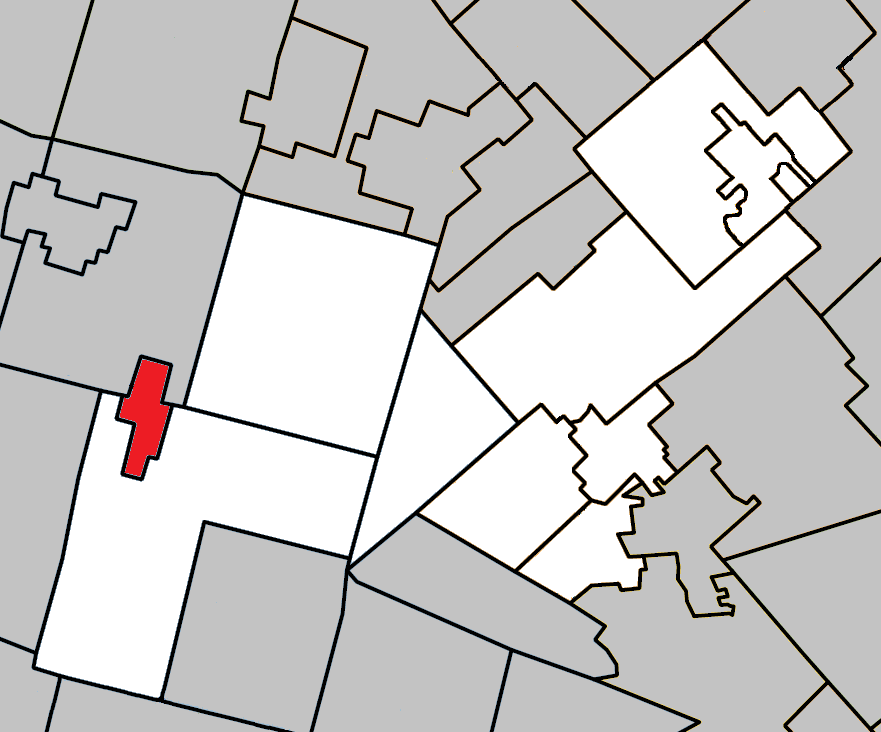
- Location within Les Pays-d'en-Haut RCM

- Location in central Quebec
- Coordinates: 45°54′N 74°28′W
- Country: Canada
- Province: Quebec
- Region: Laurentides
- RCM: Les Pays-d'en-Haut
- Settled: 1897
- Constituted: February 19, 1914

Government
  - Mayor: Louise Trottier
  - Fed. riding: Les Pays-d'en-Haut
  - Prov. riding: Argenteuil

Area
  - Total: 13.15 km^{2} (5.08 sq mi)
  - Land: 8.88 km^{2} (3.43 sq mi)
- Elevation: 290 m (950 ft)

Population (2021)
  - Total: 175
  - Density: 19.7/km^{2} (51/sq mi)
  - Pop (2016–21): ▼8.9%
  - Dwellings: 212
- Time zone: UTC−5 (EST)
  - Summer (DST): UTC−4 (EDT)
- Postal code(s): J0T 2M0
- Area codes: 450 and 579
- Highways: R-364
- Website: www.lac-des-seize-iles.com

Lac-des-Seize-Îles (French pronunciation: [lak de sɛz il]; French for Sixteen Island Lake) is a village and municipality in the Laurentides region of Quebec, Canada, part of the Les Pays-d'en-Haut Regional County Municipality. The municipality surrounds and is named after Sixteen Island Lake (Lac des Seize Îles) with the village situated at the northern end of this lake.

== History ==
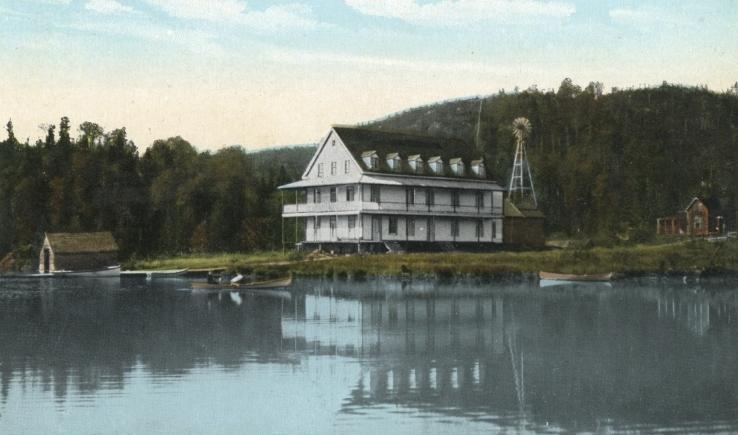
Laurentian House, Sixteen Island Lake, about 1910

Prior to European contact, this territory was occupied by the Weskarini Algonquin First Nation, and recent archaeological searches have uncovered 500-year old Huron and 700-year old Iriquoan pottery vases, suggesting the lake was possibly a meeting place.

The first pioneers arrived in this place in 1897, coming mainly from Saint-Joachim-de-Shefford and Roxton Falls. The post office opened a year later in 1898, identified under the English name of Sixteen Island Lake. In 1901, the mission of Notre-Dame-de-la-Sagesse was established and became a parish in 1937. In 1914, the Municipality of Lac-des-Seize-Îles was formed by separating from the Township Municipalities of Montcalm and Wentworth.

Pine Lake, located 1.5 km from Lac-des-Seize-Îles, received its first share of summer vacationers in 1907. A post office, identified as Lac-des-Pins, was serving vacationers between 1922 and 1954.

== Geography ==
Lac-des-Seize-Îles is located about 27 kilometers (17 mi) west of Saint-Sauveur-des-Monts in the Laurentian Mountains. The municipality is rectangular in shape, completely encompassing Sixteen Island Lake. This lake is 5 kilometers (3.1 mi) long and has an elevation of 290 meters (950 ft). Its descriptive name, which was in use as early as 1899 refers to its islands, however is a misnomer. There are in fact eighteen small islands on the lake, although the two smallest have no official name and have been judged too small for habitation:

- Amsden
- Armitage (Hamilton)
- Campbell
- Christie
- Cook
- Kuzik
- Cossette
- Gardner (Prentice)
- Hawthorne
- Lebel
- Myers
- Nettles
- Rochon-Charbonneau
- Rodger (Drinkell)
- Shetler
- Green (Verte)

One of the two unnamed islands is commonly referred to as 'Ile aux Bleuets', although Île Armitage was previously named as such.

The shores of Sixteen Island Lake and most of the islands are developed with cottages, making it a popular summer location when the population swells significantly. Most cottages are inaccessible by land and must be reached by boat.

== Demographics ==
Historical census populations – Lac-des-Seize-Îles

Year	Pop.	±%
1921	185	—
1931	196	+5.9%
1941	228	+16.3%
1951	236	+3.5%
1956	296	+25.4%
1961	252	−14.9%

Year	Pop.	±%
1966	255	+1.2%
1971	213	−16.5%
1976	196	−8.0%
1981	189	−3.6%
1986	187	−1.1%
1991	205	+9.6%

Year	Pop.	±%
1996	184	−10.2%
2001	242	+31.5%
2006	160	−33.9%
2011	223	+39.4%
2016	192	−13.9%
2021	175	−8.9%

2016 Population figure based on revised count.
Source: Statistics Canada

Private dwellings occupied by usual residents (2021): 96 (total dwellings: 212)

Mother tongue (2021):

- English as first language: 2.9%
- French as first language: 91.4%
- English and French as first language: 2.9%
- Other as first language: 0%

== Government ==
List of former mayors:

- Maurice Leclair (...–2005)
- JoAnne Fandrich (2005–2009)
- Luc Lamond (2009–2013)
- Yves Baillargeon (2013–2017)
- René Pelletier (2017–2021)
- Corina Lupu (2021–present)

== Education ==
The Sir Wilfrid Laurier School Board operates English-language public schools:

- Morin Heights Elementary School in Morin-Heights serves all of the town limits
- Laurentian Elementary School in Lachute also serves a portion
- Laurentian Regional High School in Lachute

== See also ==
- List of municipalities in Quebec
