= Saint-André-d'Argenteuil =

- Municipality
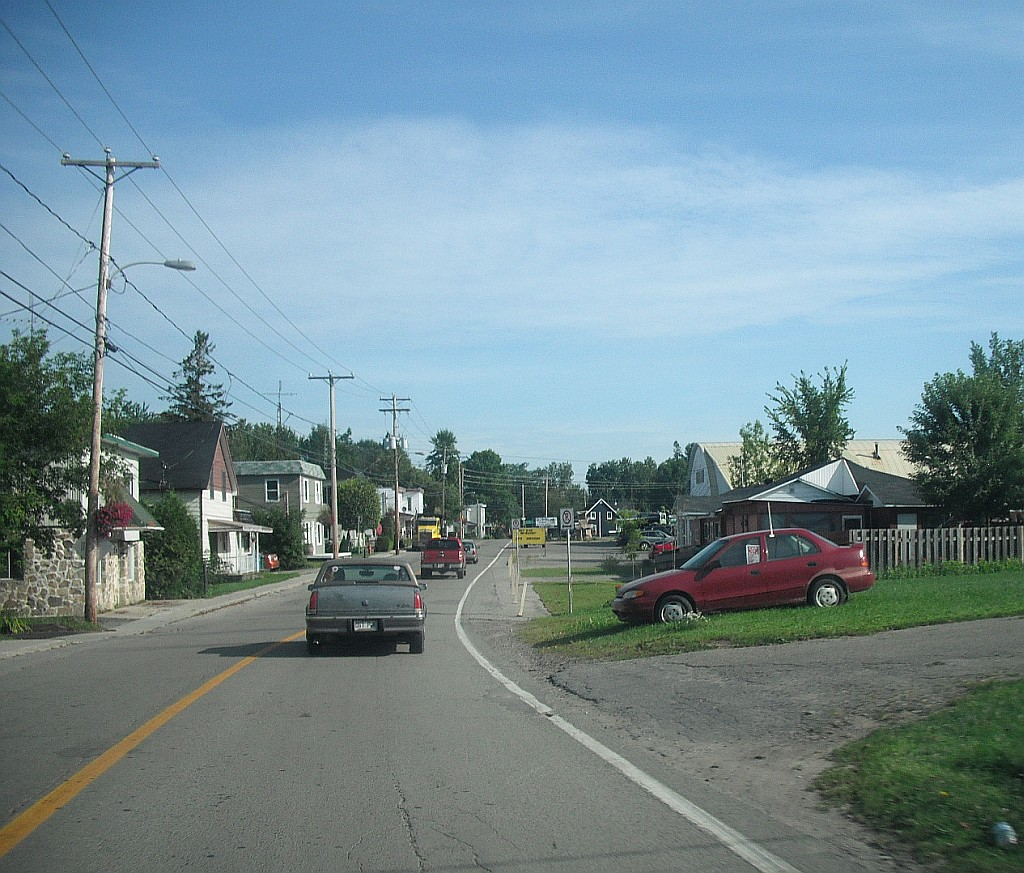

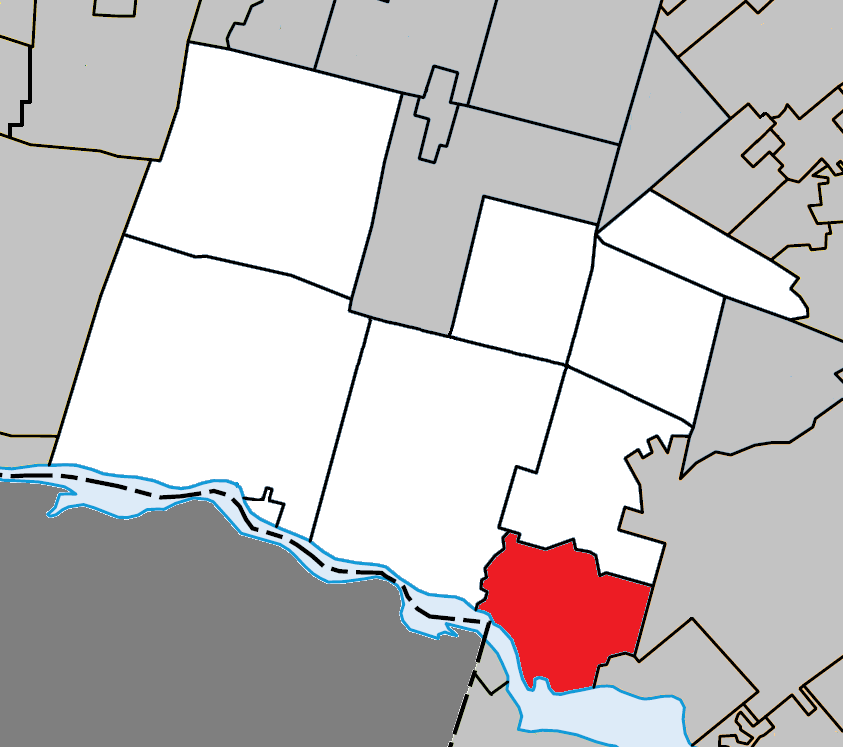
- Location within Argenteuil RCM

- Location in central Quebec
- Coordinates: 45°34′N 74°20′W
- Country: Canada
- Province: Quebec
- Region: Laurentides
- RCM: Argenteuil
- Settled: 1800
- Constituted: December 29, 1999

Government
  - Mayor: Stephen Matthews
  - Fed. riding: Argenteuil—La Petite-Nation
  - Prov. riding: Argenteuil

Area
  - Total: 101.74 km^{2} (39.28 sq mi)
  - Land: 97.69 km^{2} (37.72 sq mi)

Population (2021)
  - Total: 3,053
  - Density: 31.3/km^{2} (81/sq mi)
  - Pop 2016-2021: ▲1.1%
  - Dwellings: 1,490
- Demonym(s): Andréen, Andréenne
- Time zone: UTC−5 (EST)
  - Summer (DST): UTC−4 (EDT)
- Postal code(s): J0V 1X0
- Area codes: 450 and 579
- Highways A-50: R-327; R-344
- Geocode: 76008
- Website: stada.ca

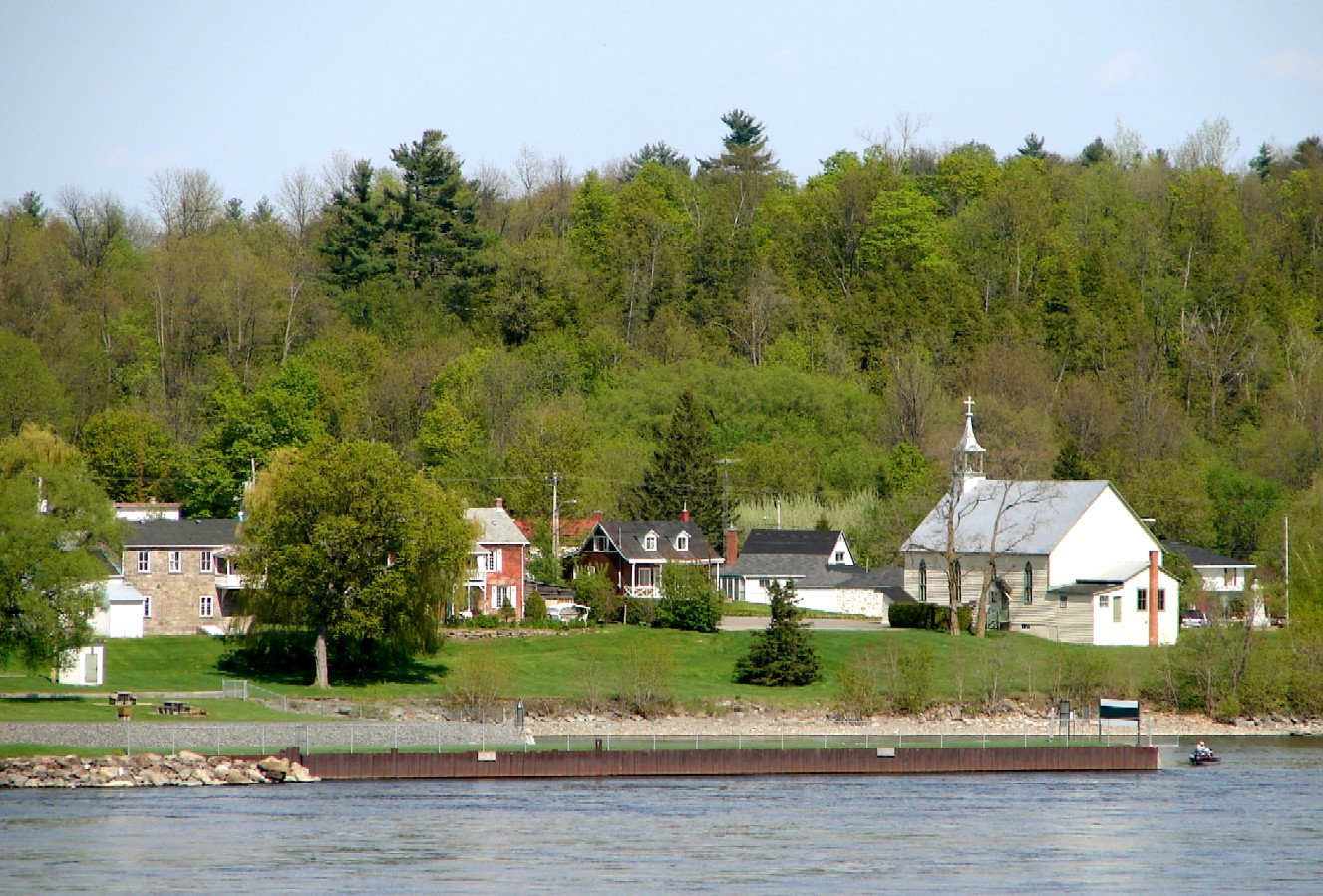
Carillon

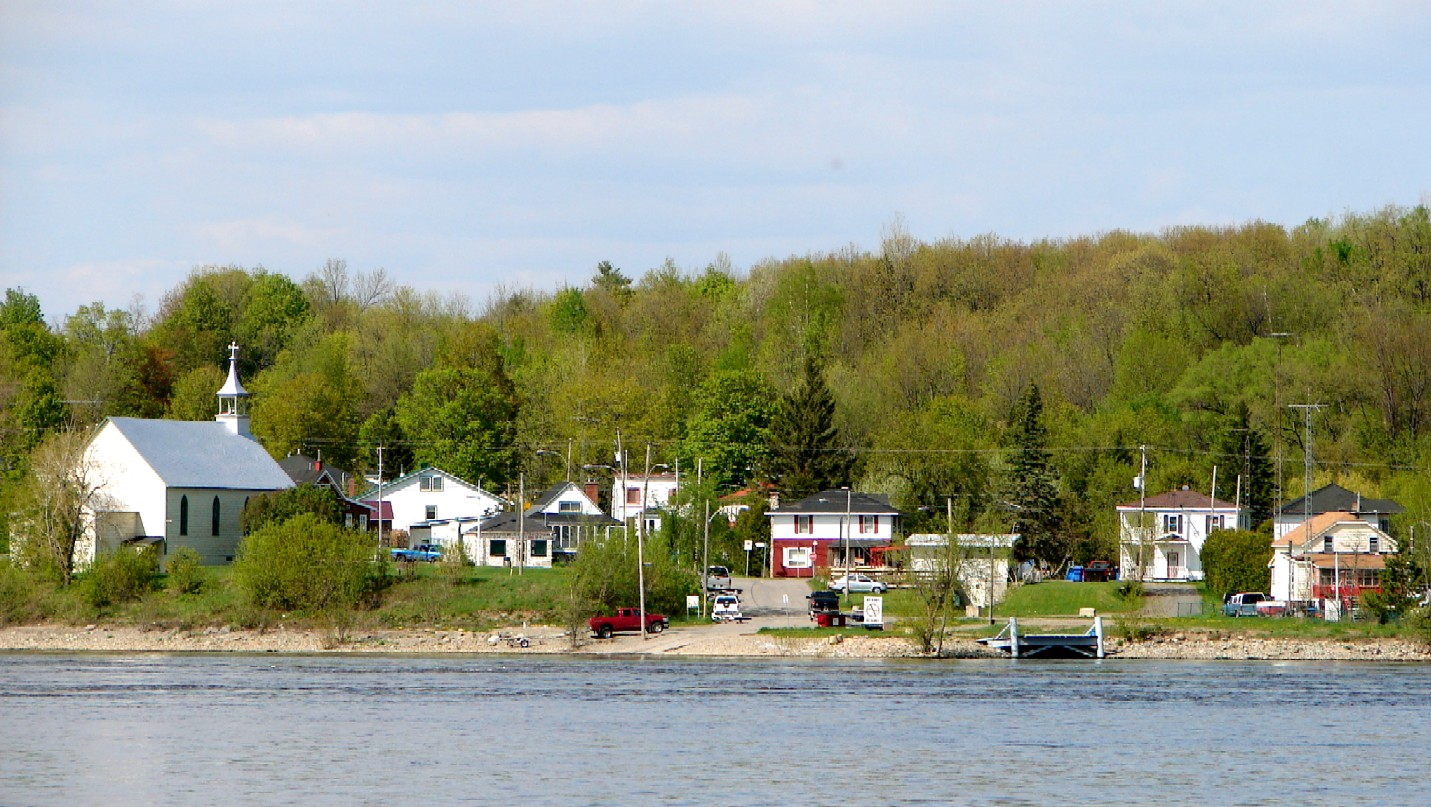
Carillon

Saint-André-d'Argenteuil (French pronunciation: [sɛ̃t‿ɑ̃dʁe daʁʒɑ̃tœj]) is a municipality in the Laurentides region of Quebec, Canada, part of the Argenteuil Regional County Municipality. It is located along the Ottawa River, just south of Lachute.

== History ==
Carillon, being located at the foot of the Long-Sault rapids on the Ottawa River, has a long history. It started out as a trading post at the beginning of the seventeenth century, and then a relay station for voyageurs. Here in 1660, Adam Dollard des Ormeaux and his companions saved New France from attack by the Iroquois during the Battle of Long Sault, according to tradition. However, evidence was found of a burnt palisade in the vicinity of the earthworks of the present dam constructed on the opposite side in present day Ontario. In 1671, an officer of the Carignan Regiment, Philippe Carion (Carrion), obtained the area as a concession in the Montreal Island Seigneury from Dollier de Casson and established a trading post. But the name Carillon was reported in 1686 in the journal of Chevalier de Troyes.

Around 1800, settlers of Scottish origin settled at the confluence of the North River (Rivière du Nord) and Rouge River near the Ottawa River. In 1819, the post office with the English name of St. Andrews East (changed to Saint-André-Est in 1978) was established here, having adopted the name of the patron saint of the Scottish settlers. Also here two years later in 1821, John Joseph Caldwell Abbott, Prime Minister of Canada from 1891 to 1892, was born. In 1845, the Argenteuil Municipality was founded, but was abolished two years later. In 1855, the Parish Municipality of Saint-André-d'Argenteuil was formed.

In the nineteenth century, the timber industry was very active in this section of the Laurentian Mountains and the first paper mill in Canada was built on this land in 1803. From the 1830s onward, Carillon became the site of the Carillon Canal, built to facilitate military transport up the Ottawa River. It was enlarged in the 1870s to accommodate commercial boat traffic. Today it is a National Historic Site of Canada. In 1959, construction began on the Carillon Generating Station and dam, raising the Ottawa River water level by over 62 feet (19 m) at Carillon, flooding the rapids of Long-Sault and transforming them into calm water.

Carillon and Saint-André-Est became independent municipalities in 1887 and 1958 respectively, their territories being separated from the Parish Municipality of Saint-André-d'Argenteuil. But on December 29, 1999, the Village Municipality of Saint-André-Est, the Village Municipality of Carillon, and the Parish Municipality of Saint-André-d'Argenteuil were rejoined into the new Municipality of Saint-André–Carillon, which was renamed on November 25, 2000, to Saint-André-d'Argenteuil.

== Demographics ==
Canada census – Saint-André-d'Argenteuil community profile

	2021	2016	2011
Population	3,053 (+1.1% from 2016)	3,020 (-7.8% from 2011)	3,275 (+5.7% from 2006)
Land area	97.69 km^{2} (37.72 sq mi)	97.80 km^{2} (37.76 sq mi)	97.78 km^{2} (37.75 sq mi)
Population density	31.3/km^{2} (81/sq mi)	30.9/km^{2} (80/sq mi)	33.5/km^{2} (87/sq mi)
Median age	49.2 (M: 50.4, F: 48.0)	49.4 (M: 50.0, F: 48.9)	46.1 (M: 46.4, F: 45.5)
Private dwellings	1,490 (total)	1,558 (total)	1,551 (total)
Median household income		$54,016	$53,612

References: 2021 2016 2011

Historical census populations – Saint-André-d'Argenteuil

Year	Pop.	±%
1976	2,488	—
1981	2,539	+2.0%
1986	2,642	+4.1%
1991	2,628	−0.5%
1996	2,921	+11.1%

Year	Pop.	±%
2001	2,867	−1.8%
2006	3,097	+8.0%
2011	3,275	+5.7%
2016	3,020	−7.8%
2021	3,053	+1.1%

Population amounts prior to 1999 are total of Carillon (Village), Saint-André-Est (Village), and Saint-André-d'Argenteuil (Parish).
Source: Statistics Canada

Mother tongue:

- English as first language: 4.8%
- French as first language: 94.0%
- English and French as first language: 0.3%
- Other as first language: 0.9%

== Government ==
List of former mayors:

- Daniel Beaulieu (2003–2009)
- André Jetté (2009–2017)
- Marc-Olivier Labelle (2017–2021)
- Stephen Matthews (2021–present)

== Education ==
The Centre de services scolaire de la Rivière-du-Nord operates French-language public schools.

- École polyvalente Lavigne in Lachute
- École primaire Saint-André in Saint-André d’Argenteuil

The Sir Wilfrid Laurier School Board operates English-language public schools:

- Laurentian Elementary School in Lachute
- Laurentian Regional High School in Lachute

== Notable people ==
- Sir John Abbott, third Canadian Prime Minister
- Gilbert Rozon, founder of Just for Laughs
- Julia Grace Wales, peace activist
- Maude Abbott, medical doctor

== See also ==
- List of municipalities in Quebec
