= Quebec Route 327 =

Highway in Quebec, Canada

Route 327

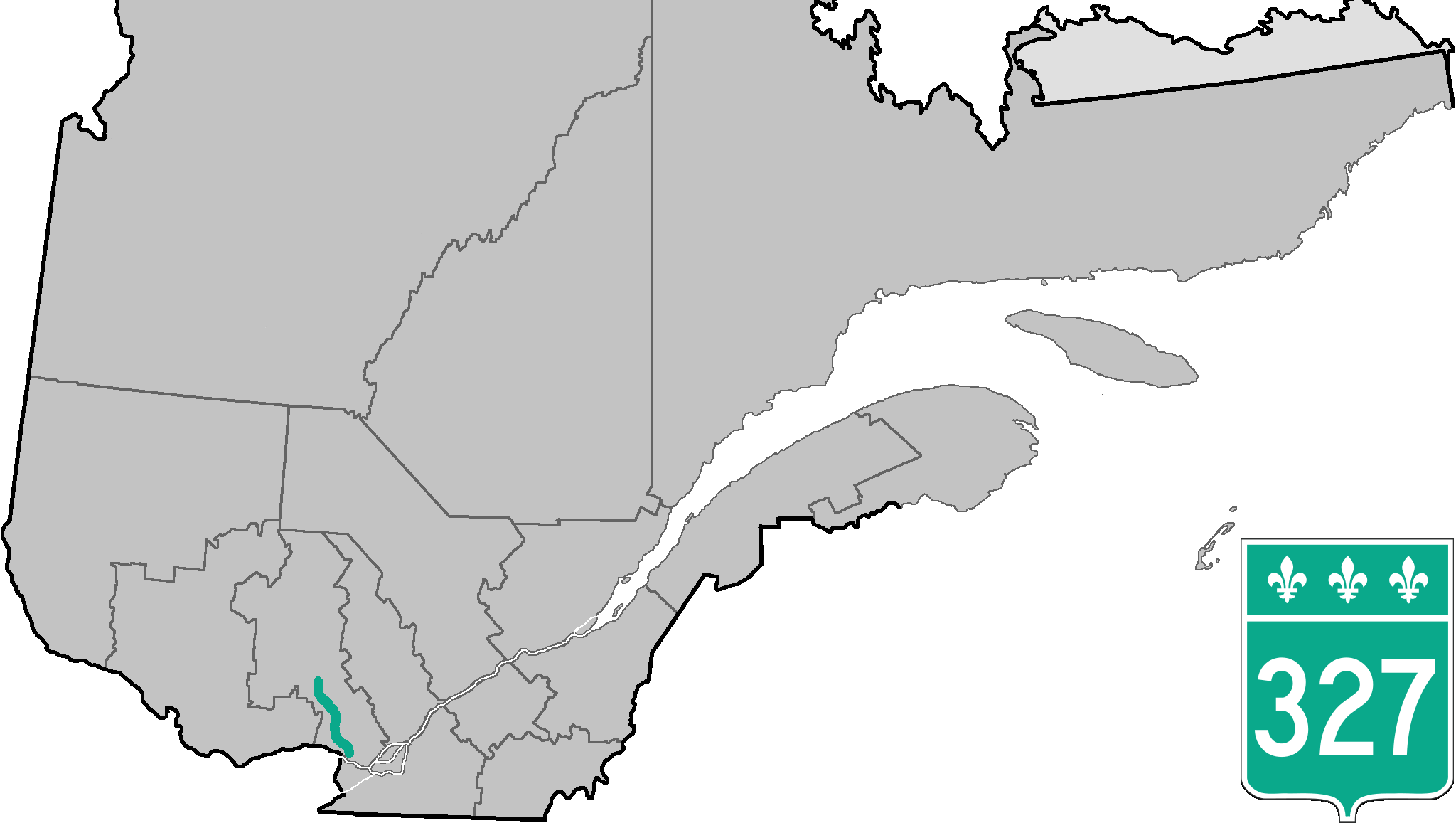

Route information
- Maintained by Transports Québec
- Length: 102.8 km (63.9 mi)

Major junctions
- South end: R-344 in Saint-André-d'Argenteuil
- A-50 / R-148 in Lachute; R-364 in Arundel; R-117 (TCH) in Mont-Tremblant
- North end: Chemin de Voyageurs in Mont-Tremblant

Location
- Country: Canada
- Province: Quebec
- Major cities: Lachute, Mont-Tremblant

Highway system
- Quebec provincial highways; Autoroutes; List; Former
← R-325	→ R-329

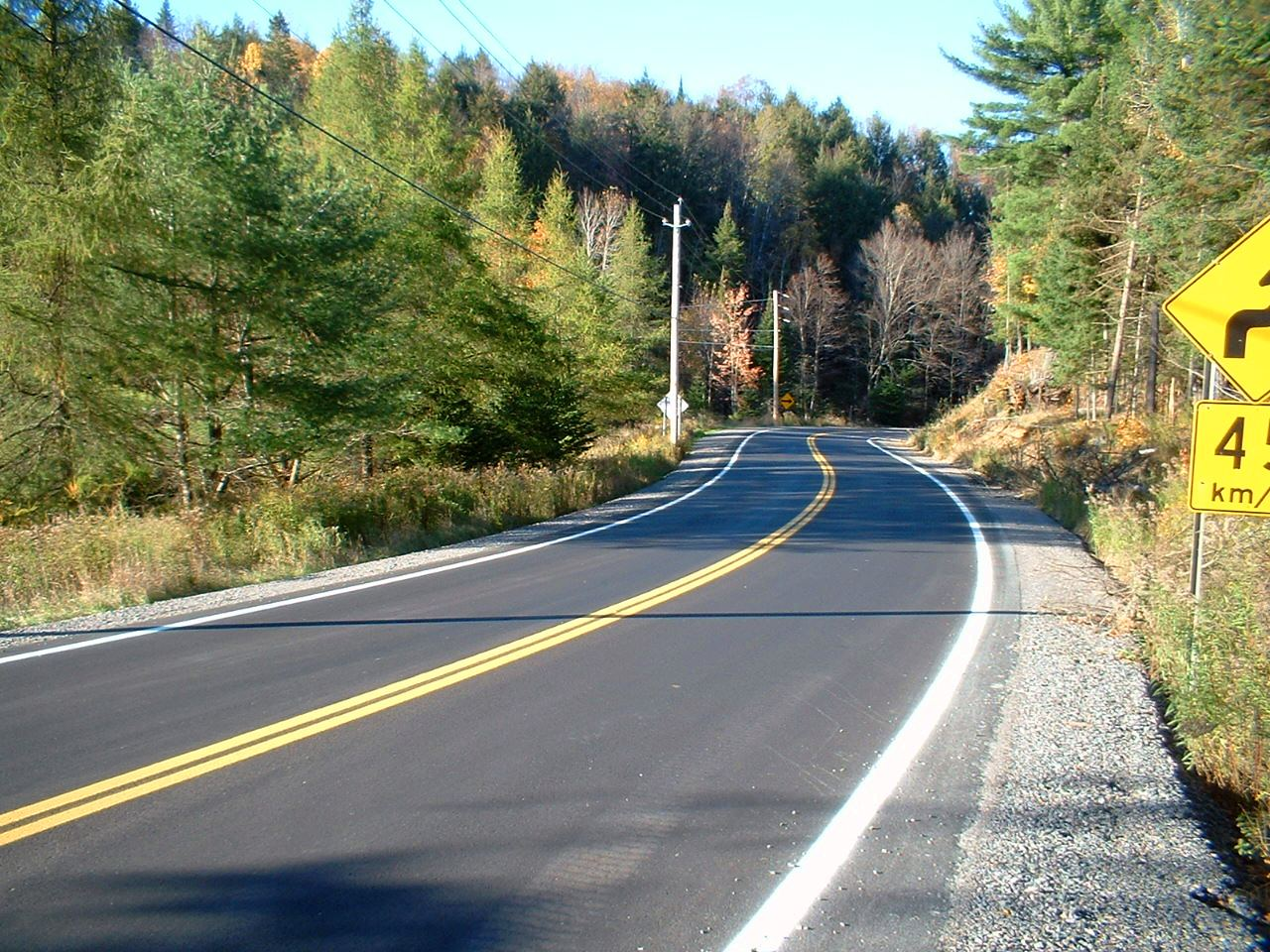
Route 327 in Harrington township.

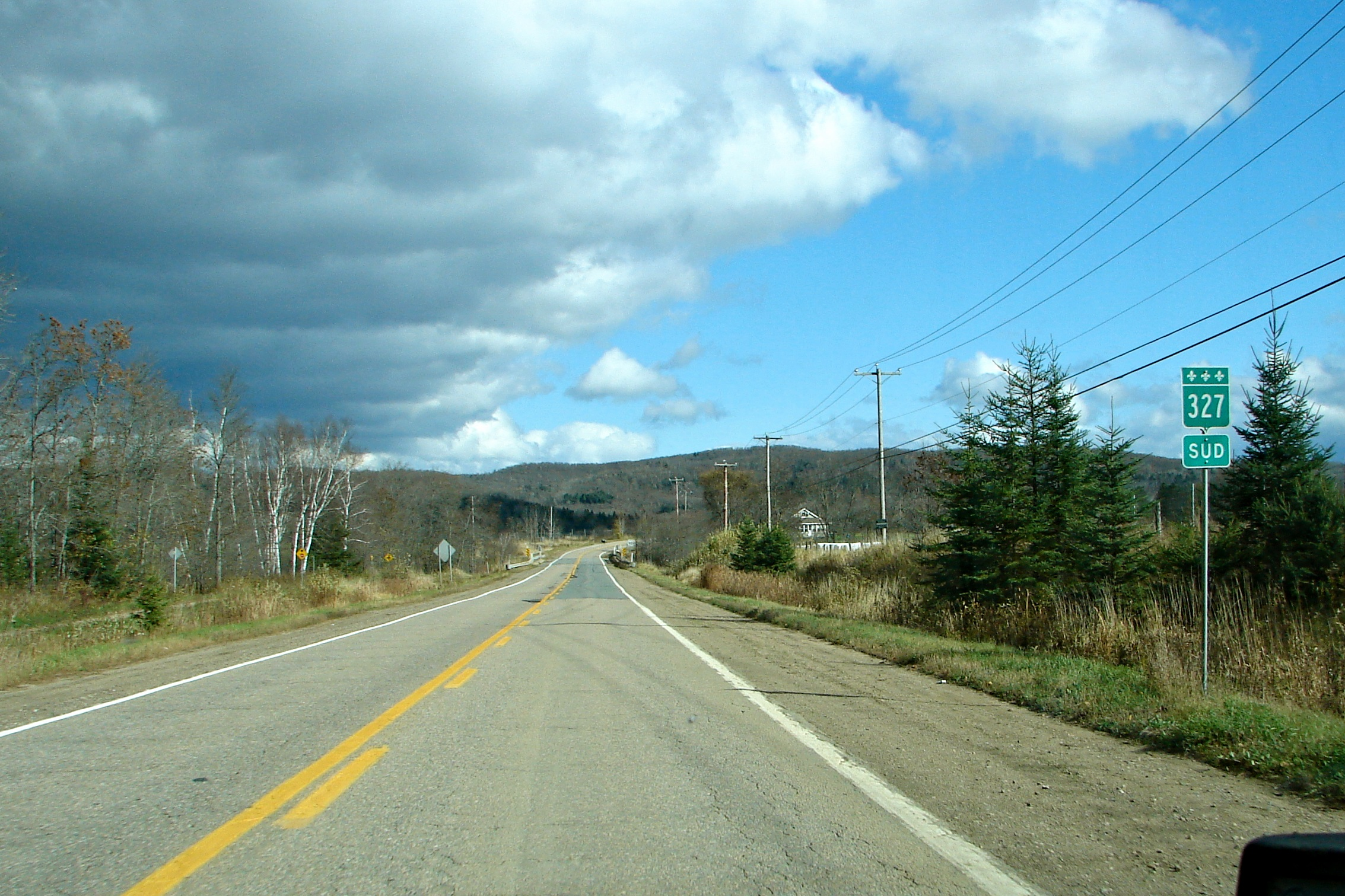
Route 327 between Arundel and Weir.

Route 327 is a provincial highway located in the Laurentides region of Quebec. The 90-kilometer highway runs from St-André-d'Argenteuil at the junction of Route 344 to Mont-Tremblant just west of the Provincial Park of the same name. The route serves as the main connection between Argenteuil county and the popular tourist region of the Upper Laurentides. In Lachute it is briefly concurrent with Highway 148 (across a bridge). It is also concurrent with Route 364 between Weir and Arundel. Significant portions of this highway are meandering and have a maximum speed limit of 70 km/h.

== Municipalities along Route 327 ==
- Saint-Andre-d'Argenteuil
- Lachute
- Brownsburg-Chatham
- Grenville-sur-la-Rouge
- Harrington
- Montcalm
- Arundel
- Mont-Tremblant

== Major intersections ==
RCM or ET	Municipality	Km	Junction	Notes
Southern terminus of Route 327
Argenteuil	Saint-André-d'Argenteuil	0.0	R-344	344 WEST: to Brownsburg-Chatham; 344 EAST: to Saint-Placide
Argenteuil	Lachute	6.8; 7.3	A-50	50 EAST: to Mirabel; 50 WEST: to Brownsburg-Chatham
Argenteuil	Lachute	11.0; 11.2	R-148 (Overlap 0.2 km)	148 EAST: to Mirabel; 148 WEST: to Brownsburg-Chatham
Les Laurentides	Arundel	61.1; 68.6	R-364 (Overlap 7.5 km)	364 EAST: to Lac-des-Seize-Îles; 364 WEST: to Huberdeau
Les Laurentides	Mont-Tremblant	86.9; 87.2	R-117 (TCH)	117 SOUTH: to Mont-Blanc; 117 NORTH: to La Conception
Les Laurentides	Mont-Tremblant	102.8	Chemin des Voyageurs	EAST: to Lac-Supérieur
Northern terminus of Route 327

== See also ==
- List of Quebec provincial highways
