= Mille-Isles =

- Municipality
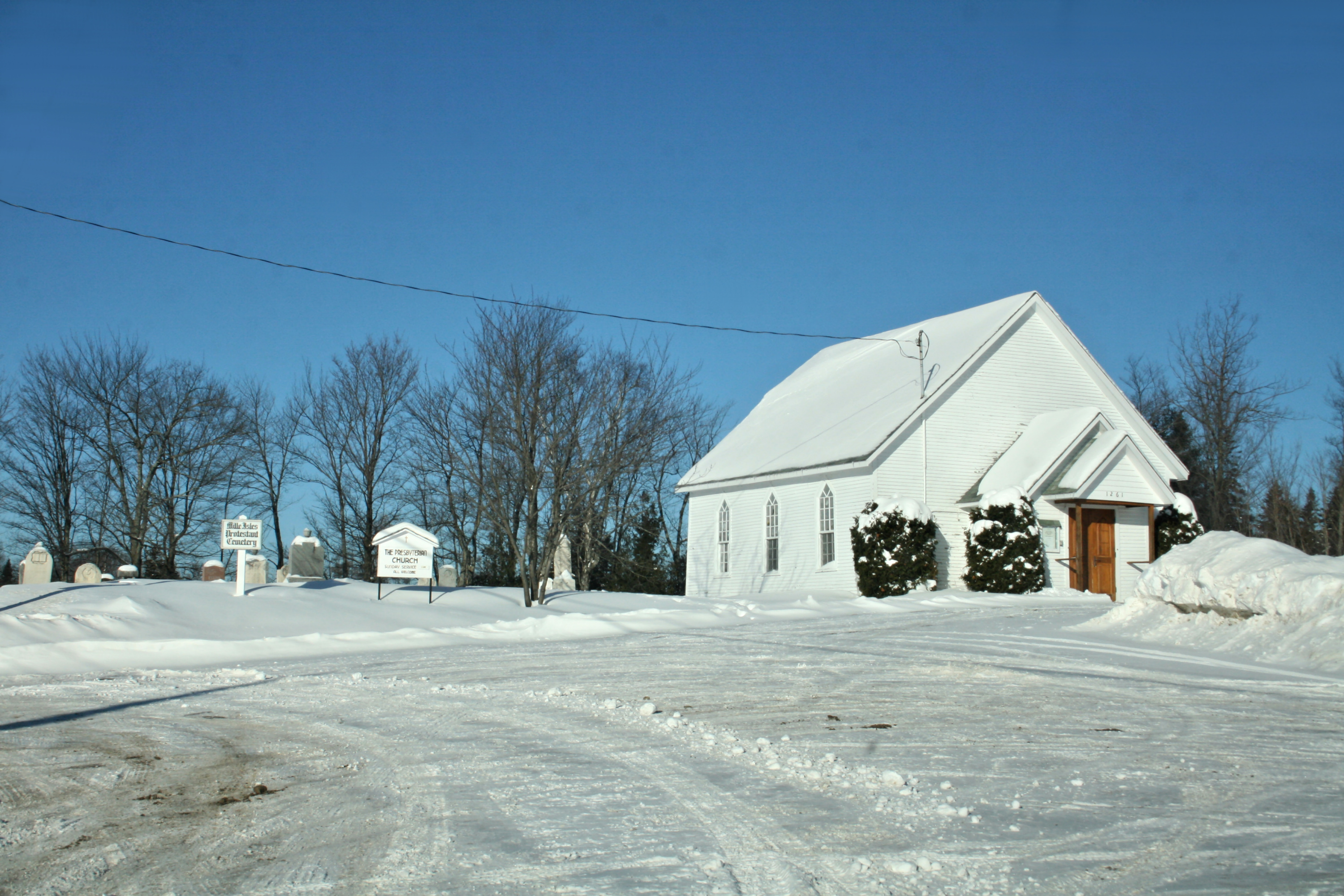
- Church in Mille-Isles

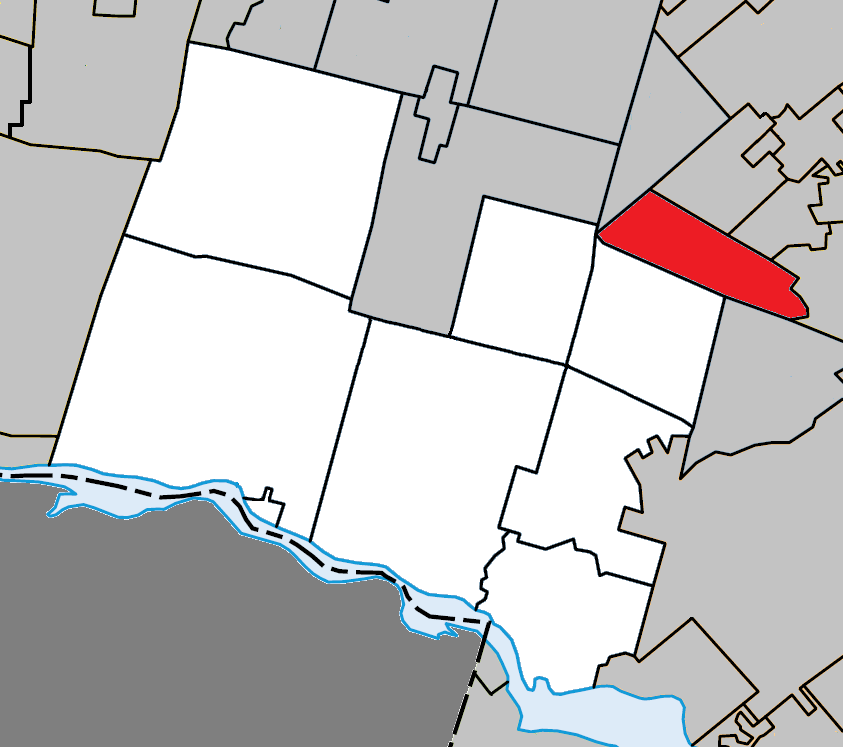
- Location within Argenteuil RCM

- Location in central Quebec
- Coordinates: 45°49′N 74°13′W
- Country: Canada
- Province: Quebec
- Region: Laurentides
- RCM: Argenteuil
- Settled: 1850s
- Constituted: July 1, 1855

Government
  - Mayor: Howard Sauvé
  - Federal riding: Les Pays-d'en-Haut
  - Prov. riding: Argenteuil

Area
  - Total: 61.92 km^{2} (23.91 sq mi)
  - Land: 58.73 km^{2} (22.68 sq mi)

Population (2021)
  - Total: 1,721
  - Density: 29.3/km^{2} (76/sq mi)
  - Pop 2016-2021: ▲9.8%
  - Dwellings: 950
- Time zone: UTC−5 (EST)
  - Summer (DST): UTC−4 (EDT)
- Postal code(s): J0R 1A0
- Area codes: 450 and 579
- Highways: R-329
- Website: mille-isles.ca

Mille-Isles (French pronunciation: [mil il], lit. 'Thousand Islands') is a municipality in the Laurentides region of Quebec, Canada, part of the Argenteuil Regional County Municipality, west of Saint-Jérôme.

Mille-Isles is in the Laurentian Hills, crossed by rivers and dotted with fish-filled lakes.

== History ==
The municipality is named after the old Mille-Isles Seigneury, which originally straddled the Mille Îles River (the seigneury uses the old spelling, whereas the river uses the modern word that substitutes a circumflex for the "s"). In 1683, the seigneury was granted to Michel-Sidrac Dugué de Boisbriand (circa 1638-1688), who was governor of Montreal in 1670. In 1714, it was inherited by Charles-Gaspard Piot de Langloiserie (circa 1655-1715) and Jean Petit (1663-1720), husbands of Marie-Thérèse Dugué and Charlotte Dugué respectively, daughters of the first lord. In 1752, additional land in the extreme north-west of the Mille-Isles Seigneury was given to Eustache Lambert Dumont and it is within this part that the municipality is located.

The first settlers were from Ireland and arrived around 1850. The municipality was officially founded in 1855, following separation from the parish of Saint-Jérôme.

== Geography ==
=== Climate ===
Climate data for Mille-Isles, Quebec: (1981–2010 normals, extremes 1963–1991)
Month	Jan	Feb	Mar	Apr	May	Jun	Jul	Aug	Sep	Oct	Nov	Dec	Year
Record high °C (°F)	11.5 (52.7)	12.0 (53.6)	23.9 (75.0)	31.0 (87.8)	34.0 (93.2)	35.6 (96.1)	35.6 (96.1)	35.6 (96.1)	33.0 (91.4)	28.3 (82.9)	22.2 (72.0)	20.0 (68.0)	35.6 (96.1)
Mean daily maximum °C (°F)	−6.3 (20.7)	−3.7 (25.3)	1.8 (35.2)	10.5 (50.9)	18.2 (64.8)	23.2 (73.8)	25.6 (78.1)	24.5 (76.1)	19.4 (66.9)	11.7 (53.1)	4.4 (39.9)	−2.5 (27.5)	10.6 (51.1)
Daily mean °C (°F)	−11.4 (11.5)	−9 (16)	−3.3 (26.1)	−5.3 (22.5)	12.4 (54.3)	17.5 (63.5)	20.1 (68.2)	18.9 (66.0)	14.2 (57.6)	7.1 (44.8)	0.7 (33.3)	−6.9 (19.6)	6.4 (43.5)
Mean daily minimum °C (°F)	−16.4 (2.5)	−14.2 (6.4)	−8.3 (17.1)	0.0 (32.0)	6.5 (43.7)	11.8 (53.2)	14.5 (58.1)	13.4 (56.1)	8.8 (47.8)	2.5 (36.5)	−3.1 (26.4)	−11.2 (11.8)	0.4 (32.7)
Record low °C (°F)	−41.7 (−43.1)	−41.1 (−42.0)	−32.8 (−27.0)	−21.7 (−7.1)	−8.3 (17.1)	−1.7 (28.9)	2.8 (37.0)	0.0 (32.0)	−5.6 (21.9)	−11.7 (10.9)	−26.1 (−15.0)	−40 (−40)	−41.7 (−43.1)
Average precipitation mm (inches)	73.6 (2.90)	59.4 (2.34)	64.4 (2.54)	91.8 (3.61)	92.8 (3.65)	114.0 (4.49)	97.6 (3.84)	88.3 (3.48)	99.2 (3.91)	97.6 (3.84)	102.8 (4.05)	67.1 (2.64)	1,048.7 (41.29)
Average snowfall cm (inches)	49.9 (19.6)	37.5 (14.8)	32.9 (13.0)	4.8 (1.9)	0.0 (0.0)	0.0 (0.0)	0.0 (0.0)	0.0 (0.0)	0.0 (0.0)	1.3 (0.5)	16.4 (6.5)	41.2 (16.2)	184.1 (72.5)
Average precipitation days (≥ 0.2 mm)	11.5	8.8	9.6	11.7	12.9	14.1	12.4	11.9	12.7	13.7	13.3	11.1	143.7
Average snowy days (≥ 0.2 cm)	10.0	6.6	4.8	1.1	0.0	0.0	0.0	0.0	0.0	0.4	3.1	8.3	34.4
Source: Environment Canada

== Demographics ==
Canada census – Mille-Isles community profile

	2021	2016	2011
Population	1,721 (+9.8% from 2016)	1,567 (-3.8% from 2011)	1,629 (+10.1% from 2006)
Land area	58.73 km^{2} (22.68 sq mi)	59.82 km^{2} (23.10 sq mi)	60.82 km^{2} (23.48 sq mi)
Population density	29.3/km^{2} (76/sq mi)	26.2/km^{2} (68/sq mi)	26.8/km^{2} (69/sq mi)
Median age	48.0 (M: 50.0, F: 46.0)	46.6 (M: 47.9, F: 45.3)	44.3 (M: 44.6, F: 43.9)
Private dwellings	950 (total) 756 (occupied)	907 (total)	912 (total)
Median household income	$81,000	$61,568	$n/a

References: 2021 2016 2011

Historical census populations – Mille-Isles

Year	Pop.	±%
1861	562	—
1871	579	+3.0%
1881	567	−2.1%
1891	519	−8.5%
1901	451	−13.1%
1911	399	−11.5%
1921	301	−24.6%
1931	231	−23.3%

Year	Pop.	±%
1941	277	+19.9%
1951	239	−13.7%
1956	231	−3.3%
1961	227	−1.7%
1966	260	+14.5%
1971	370	+42.3%
1976	433	+17.0%
1981	643	+48.5%

Year	Pop.	±%
1986	736	+14.5%
1991	944	+28.3%
1996	1,157	+22.6%
2001	1,209	+4.5%
2006	1,480	+22.4%
2011	1,629	+10.1%
2016	1,567	−3.8%
2021	1,721	+9.8%

Source: Statistics Canada

Mother tongue (2021):

- English as first language: 16.9%
- French as first language: 77.6%
- English and French as first language: 2.3%
- Other as first language: 3.2%

== Government ==
List of former mayors:

- Richard Cyr (... –2005)
- John Carson Collins (2005–2009)
- Yvon Samson (2009–2013)
- Michel Boyer (2013–2017)
- Howard Sauvé (2017–present)

== Education ==
The Commission scolaire de la Rivière-du-Nord (CSRDN) operates Francophone public schools:

- École primaire Bellefeuille in Saint-Jérôme
- École secondaire Émilien-Frenette in Saint-Jérôme and École polyvalente Lavigne in Lachute

Sir Wilfrid Laurier School Board operates English-language public schools. Schools serving the town:

- Morin Heights Elementary School in Morin-Heights serves most of the town
- Laurentia Elementary School in Saint-Jérôme serves a portion of the town
- Laurentian Regional High School in Lachute

== See also ==
- List of anglophone communities in Quebec
- List of municipalities in Quebec
