= Lake Louisa (Quebec) =

Lake in Quebec, Canada

- Lac Louisa (French)
- Location within Canada
- Location: Argenteuil, Quebec, Canada
- Coordinates: 45°46′19″N 74°25′01″W
- Max. length: 5.1 km (3.2 miles)
- Max. width: 2.3 km (1.4 miles)
- Max. depth: 56.6 m (186 ft)
- Water volume: 73.2 m^{3} (0.0593 acre⋅ft)
- Shore length^{1}: 16.9 km (10.5 miles)
- ^{1} Shore length is not a well-defined measure.

Lake Louisa (French: Lac Louisa) is a lake located in the Argenteuil region of Quebec, Canada, mostly in the Township of Wentworth. However, the southwestern part of the lake is located in the Les Pays-d'en-Haut region of Quebec. The lake is home to ten islands including one very small island nicknamed "Peanut Island". Other islands include Young's & Griffith's Island, Burnt Island, MacBurny's Island, Gagne's Island, Johnson's Island, Hope's Island and Twin Islands. The lake is approximately 5.1 kilometres long and 2.3 kilometres wide, with a perimeter of 16.9 kilometres, and holds 73.2 million cubic meters of water. The maximal depth of the lake is 56.6 m, according to a 2011 GPS survey.

The community of Louisa is located near the lake. The town has a church called St. Aidan's and a community center for resident to rent. A social club on the lake runs activities such as swimming lessons in summer months, and a property owner's association is active on the lake to manage the impact of human activities on the lake's health.

Approximately eight hundred people live at Lake Louisa during the summer, and less than a hundred live there year-round.
