= Argenteuil County, Quebec =

Coordinates: 45°48′N 74°28′W

Argenteuil County (French: Comté d'Argenteuil, pronounced [kɔ̃te daʁʒɑ̃tœj]) is an historic county in southwestern Quebec, Canada. It was located on the Ottawa River between Gatineau and Montreal. The county seat was Lachute. Argenteuil was bounded on the north by Terrebonne County, on the east by Deux-Montagnes County, on the west by Papineau County and on the south by the United Counties of Prescott and Russell in Ontario.

In the early 1980s, Quebec's counties were abolished; as a result, most of Argenteuil County became the Argenteuil Regional County Municipality. The northwestern corner was transferred to Les Laurentides Regional County Municipality the northern parts to Les Pays-d'en-Haut Regional County Municipality and some eastern parts to Deux-Montagnes Regional County Municipality.
