= Quebec Route 329 =

Highway in Quebec, Canada

Route 329

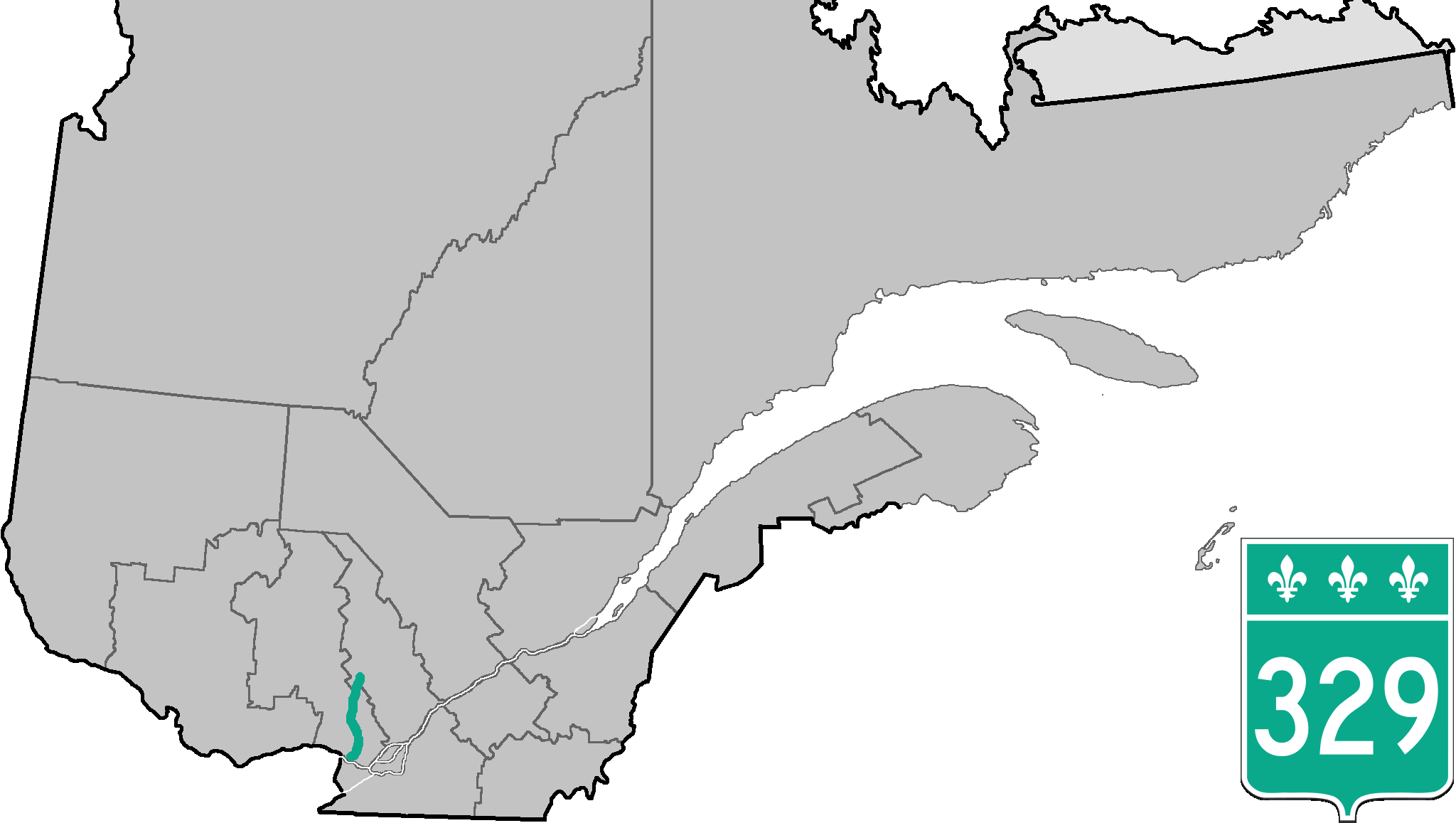

Route information
- Maintained by Transports Québec
- Length: 95.9 km (59.6 mi)

Major junctions
- South end: R-148 in Lachute
- R-158 in Lachute; R-364 in Morin-Heights; R-117 (TCH) in Sainte-Agathe-des-Monts
- North end: R-125 in Saint-Donat

Location
- Country: Canada
- Province: Quebec
- Major cities: Lachute, Morin Heights, Sainte-Agathe-des-Monts, Saint-Donat

Highway system
- Quebec provincial highways; Autoroutes; List; Former
← R-327	→ R-333

Route 329 is a provincial highway in the Laurentides and Lanaudière regions of Quebec, serving a large portion of the popular tourist area as well as numerous lakes and cottage areas in the Middle and Upper Laurentians. Beginning at the junction of Route 148 just east of Lachute, it ends 93 kilometers further north at the junction of Route 125 in Saint-Donat, just south of Mont-Tremblant National Park. It is briefly concurrent with Route 364 in Morin-Heights and Route 117 in Sainte-Agathe-des-Monts.

== Municipalities along Route 329 ==
- Lachute
- Gore
- Mille-Isles
- Morin-Heights
- Saint-Adolphe-d'Howard
- Sainte-Agathe-des-Monts
- Lantier
- Saint-Donat

== Major intersections ==
RCM or ET	Municipality	Km	Junction	Notes
Southern terminus of Route 329
Argenteuil	Lachute	0.0	R-148	148 EAST: to Mirabel; 148 WEST: to Brownsburg-Chatham
Argenteuil	Lachute	3.4; 4.3	R-158 (Overlap 0.9 km)	158 WEST: to Lachute; 158 EAST: to Mirabel
Argenteuil	Mille-Isles	25.7	Chemin de Milles-Isles	EAST: to Saint-Jérôme
Les Pays-d'en-Haut	Morin-Heights	35.7; 37.0	R-364 (Overlap 1.3 km)	364 EAST: to Saint-Sauveur; 364 WEST: to Saint-Adolphe-d'Howard
Les Laurentides	Sainte-Agathe-des-Monts	62.0; 64.1	R-117 (TCH) (Overlap 2.1 km)	117 SOUTH: to Val-David; 117 NORTH: to Mont-Blanc
Matawinie	Saint-Donat	95.9	R-125	125 SOUTH: to Notre-Dame-de-la-Merci; 125 NORTH: to Lac-des-Dix-Milles
Northern terminus of Route 329

== See also ==
- List of Quebec provincial highways
