= Gore, Quebec =

Gore
- Township municipality
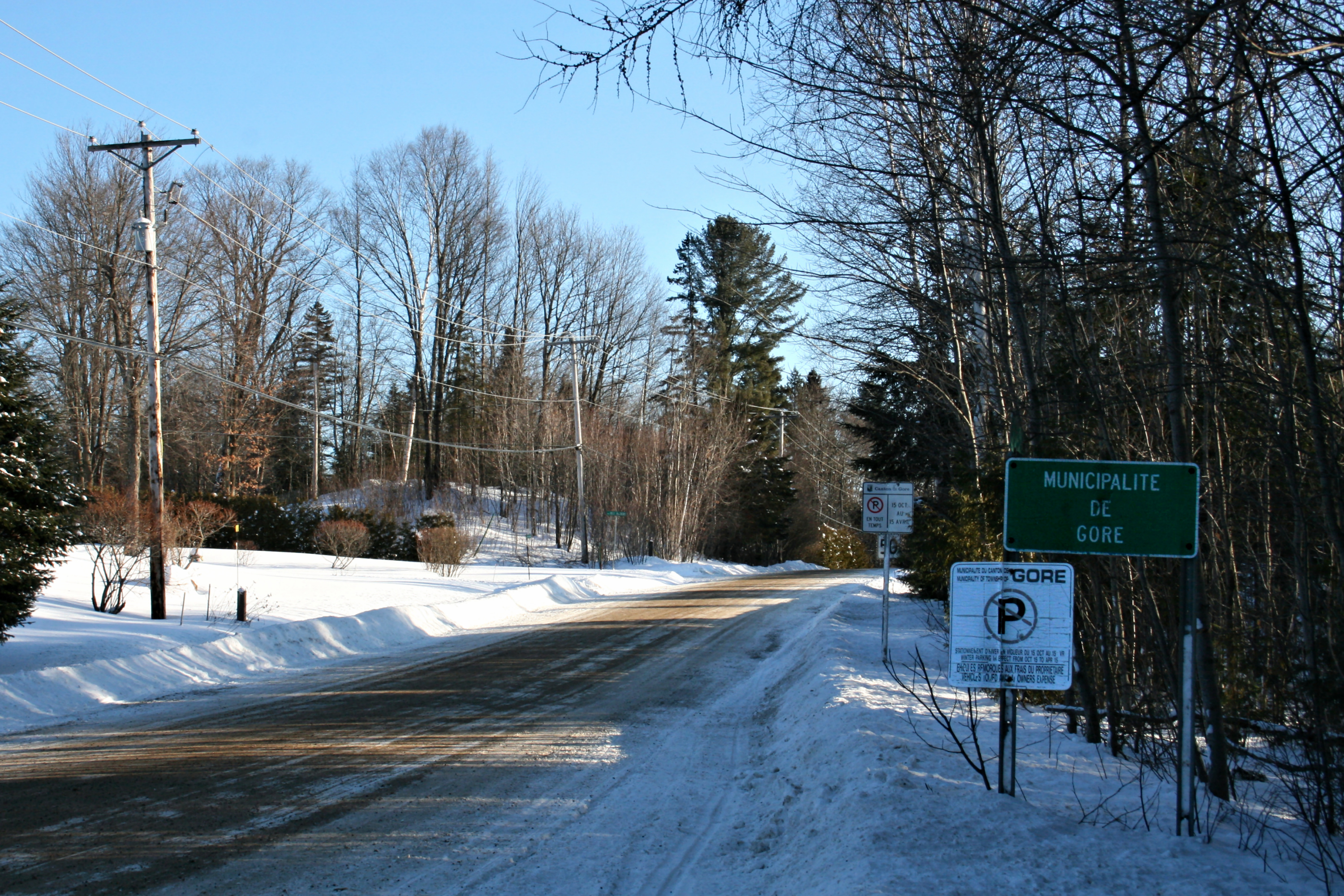
- Entrance sign in Gore

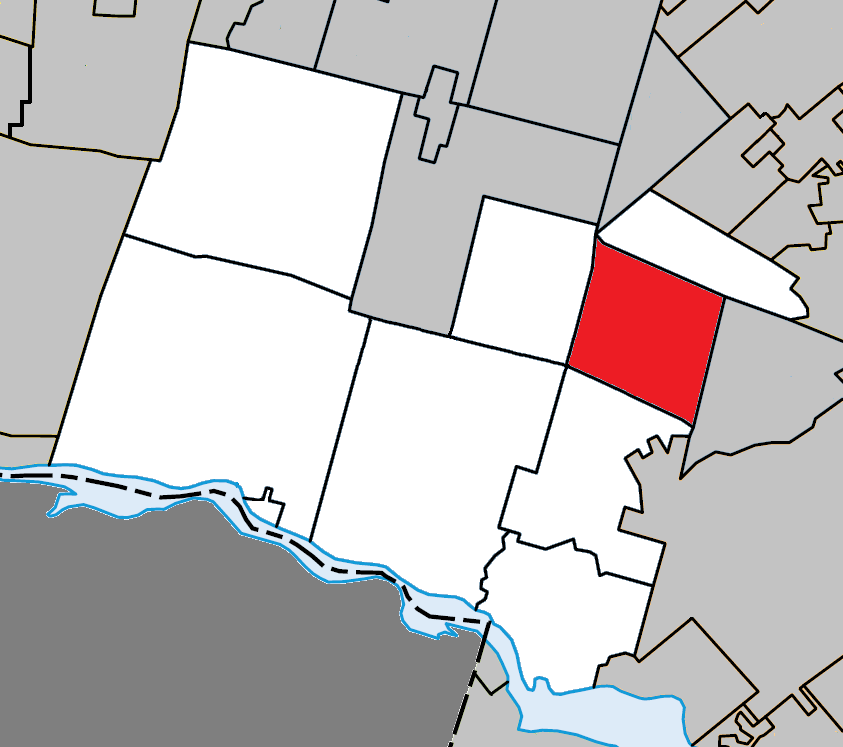
- Location within Argenteuil RCM

- Location in central Quebec
- Coordinates: 45°46′N 74°15′W
- Country: Canada
- Province: Quebec
- Region: Laurentides
- RCM: Argenteuil
- Settled: 1840s
- Constituted: July 1, 1855
- Named for: Francis Gore

Government
  - Mayor: Alan Giroux
  - Federal riding: Les Pays-d'en-Haut
  - Prov. riding: Argenteuil

Area
  - Total: 96.45 km^{2} (37.24 sq mi)
  - Land: 90.04 km^{2} (34.76 sq mi)

Population (2021)
  - Total: 2,283
  - Density: 25.4/km^{2} (66/sq mi)
  - Pop 2016-2021: ▲19.9%
  - Dwellings: 1,615
- Time zone: UTC−5 (EST)
  - Summer (DST): UTC−4 (EDT)
- Postal code(s): J0V 1K0
- Area codes: 450 and 579
- Highways: R-329
- Website: www.cantondegore.qc.ca

Gore is a township municipality in the Canadian province of Quebec, located within the Argenteuil Regional County Municipality. Its main community is Lakefield.

== History ==
The Gore Township was established in 1840, named after Francis Gore (1769–1852), Lieutenant-Governor of Upper Canada from 1806 to 1811 and from 1815 to 1817. It was colonized by Scottish and Irish settlers, such as Robert Smith and James Stephenson.

In 1845, the Gore Municipality was formed, abolished two years later, and restored in 1855. In 1853 it had about 1000 inhabitants but this dropped to about 800 people ten years later, almost all of Irish origin. The Gore Post Office operated between 1898 and 1958.

== Geography ==
Located in the Laurentian Mountains, the township consists of rugged Canadian Shield with an elevation varying between 168 meters (551 ft) and 427 meters (1,401 ft). The terrain is characterized by forested mountains and numerous streams and lakes. Notable lakes include Barron, Hughes, Chevreuil, aux Oiseaux, Solar, Caroline, Evans, Dawson, Clark, Grace, Sugarloaf, Clair, and Carruthers; many of them have been entirely developed over the years, but there still remain many with little or no construction to date.

The majority of its territory is covered by old-growth forests with a wide variety of species both deciduous and coniferous, such as birch, poplar, sugar maple, beech, white pine, fir, spruce, hemlock, and cedar.

== Demographics ==
In the 2021 Census of Population conducted by Statistics Canada, Gore had a population of 2,283 living in 1,124 of its 1,615 total private dwellings, a change of 19.9% from its 2016 population of 1,904. With a land area of 90.04 km^{2} (34.76 sq mi), it had a population density of 25.4/km^{2} (65.7/sq mi) in 2021.

Canada census – Gore community profile

| | 2021 | 2016 | 2011 |
| Population | 2,283 (+19.9% from 2016) | 1,904 (+7.3% from 2011) | 1,775 (+15.3% from 2006) |
| Land area | 90.04 km^{2} (34.76 sq mi) | 92.68 km^{2} (35.78 sq mi) | 92.91 km^{2} (35.87 sq mi) |
| Population density | 25.4/km^{2} (66/sq mi) | 20.5/km^{2} (53/sq mi) | 19.1/km^{2} (49/sq mi) |
| Median age | 54.8 (M: 54.8, F: 54.0) | 52.6 (M: 52.6, F: 52.7) | 49.3 (M: 49.1, F: 49.6) |
| Private dwellings | 1,615 (total) 1,124 (occupied) | 1,542 (total) | 1,495 (total) |
| Median household income | $73,000 | $61,184 | $56,887 |

References: 2021 2016 2011

Historical census populations – Gore, Quebec

| Year | Pop. | ±% |
|---|---|---|
| 1861 | 793 | — |
| 1871 | 717 | −9.6% |
| 1881 | 636 | −11.3% |
| 1891 | 533 | −16.2% |
| 1901 | 447 | −16.1% |
| 1911 | 377 | −15.7% |
| 1921 | 304 | −19.4% |
| 1931 | 267 | −12.2% |

| Year | Pop. | ±% |
|---|---|---|
| 1941 | 266 | −0.4% |
| 1951 | 187 | −29.7% |
| 1956 | 157 | −16.0% |
| 1961 | 150 | −4.5% |
| 1966 | 176 | +17.3% |
| 1971 | 257 | +46.0% |
| 1976 | 410 | +59.5% |
| 1981 | 576 | +40.5% |

| Year | Pop. | ±% |
|---|---|---|
| 1986 | 706 | +22.6% |
| 1991 | 982 | +39.1% |
| 1996 | 1,133 | +15.4% |
| 2001 | 1,260 | +11.2% |
| 2006 | 1,540 | +22.2% |
| 2011 | 1,775 | +15.3% |
| 2016 | 1,904 | +7.3% |
| 2021 | 2,283 | +19.9% |

Source: Statistics Canada

Mother tongue (2021):

- English as first language: 17.8%
- French as first language: 76.8%
- English and French as first language: 2.2%
- Other as first language: 3.1%

== Government ==
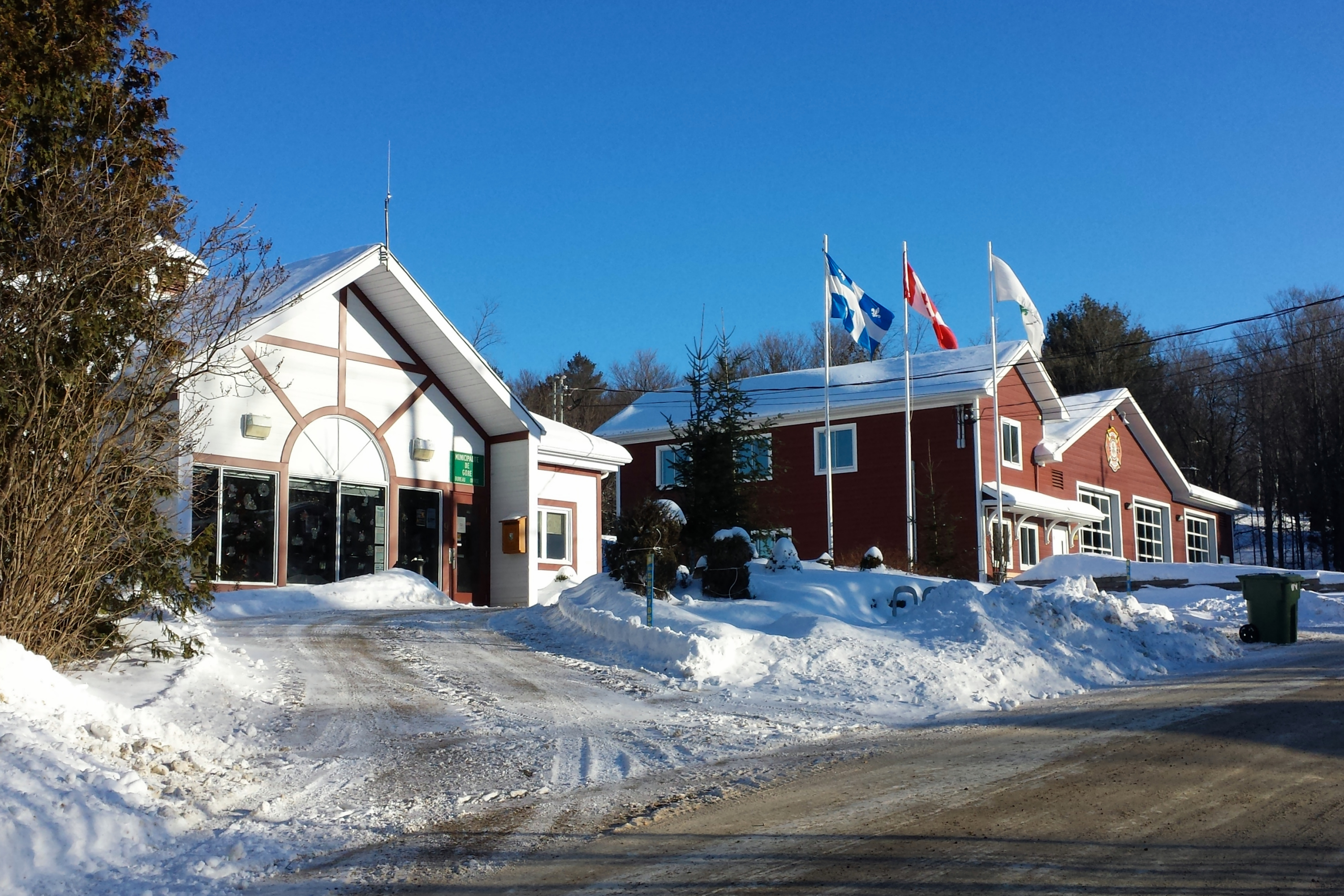
Gore town hall and fire station

Due to the 2022 Canadian federal electoral redistribution, Gore was redistricted to the new riding of Les Pays-d'en-Haut, which is represented by Tim Watchorn of the Liberal Party since 2025. Before that, Gore formed part of the federal electoral district of Argenteuil—La Petite-Nation and was represented by Stéphane Lauzon of the Liberal Party between 2015 and 2025. Provincially, Gore is part of the Argenteuil electoral district and is represented by Agnès Grondin of the Coalition Avenir Québec since 2018.

Gore federal election results
| Year | Liberal | | Conservative | | Bloc Québécois | | New Democratic | | Green | |
|---|---|---|---|---|---|---|---|---|---|---|
| 2025 | 36% | 276 | 25% | 189 | 32% | 246 | 2% | 19 | 2% | 18 |
| 2021 | 35% | 337 | 14% | 130 | 36% | 341 | 7% | 70 | 0% | 0 |
| 2019 | 32% | 305 | 11% | 103 | 42% | 405 | 8% | 75 | 5% | 52 |
| 2015 | 38% | 264 | 9% | 62 | 25% | 174 | 25% | 174 | 3% | 21 |
| 2011 | 14% | 100 | 11% | 77 | 25% | 172 | 46% | 317 | 4% | 26 |
| 2008 | 15% | 97 | 31% | 202 | 40% | 263 | 9% | 58 | 5% | 34 |
| 2006 | 20% | 105 | 22% | 119 | 42% | 227 | 9% | 50 | 7% | 36 |
| 2004 | 38% | 191 | 8% | 41 | 44% | 221 | 4% | 22 | 10% | 48 |

Gore provincial election results
| Year | CAQ | | Liberal | | QC solidaire | | Parti Québécois | |
|---|---|---|---|---|---|---|---|---|
| 2022 | 35% | 333 | 14% | 134 | 11% | 102 | 19% | 179 |
| 2018 | 39% | 391 | 22% | 219 | 14% | 138 | 17% | 169 |
| 2014 | 22% | 215 | 40% | 384 | 4% | 41 | 32% | 310 |
| 2012 | 23% | 182 | 31% | 246 | 3% | 23 | 41% | 329 |

List of former mayors:

- Ron Kelley (1997–2005)
- Scott Pearce (2005–2025)
- Alan Giroux (2025–present)

== Education ==
The Commission scolaire de la Rivière-du-Nord (CSRDN) operates Francophone public schools:

- École primaire Bellefeuille in Saint-Jérôme
- École secondaire Émilien-Frenette in Saint-Jérôme and École polyvalente Lavigne in Lachute

The Sir Wilfrid Laurier School Board operates English-language public schools:

- Laurentian Elementary School in Lachute
- Laurentian Regional High School in Lachute

== See also ==
- List of anglophone communities in Quebec
- List of township municipalities in Quebec
