= Laurentian Regional High School =

School in Lachute, Quebec, Canada

Coordinates: 45.6398°N 74.3483°W

Laurentian Regional High School (French: École secondaire Laurentian Regional) is an English secondary school in Lachute in the region of Laurentides, Québec, Canada. It contains classes for grades seven through eleven, and is run by the Sir Wilfrid Laurier School Board.

It serves Lachute, Boileau, Brownsburg-Chatham, Gore, Grenville, Grenville-sur-la-Rouge, Harrington, Lac-des-Seize-Îles, Mille-Isles, Morin-Heights, Namur, Notre-Dame-de-Bonsecours, Notre-Dame-de-la-Paix, Prévost, Saint-Andre-d'Argenteuil, Saint-Colomban, Saint-Hippolyte, Saint-Jérôme, Saint-Sauveur, Saint-Sauveur-des-Monts, Sainte-Adèle, Sainte-Anne-des-Lacs, Saint-Émile-de-Suffolk, Sainte-Marguerite-Estérel, Sainte-Sophie, Wentworth, Wentworth-Nord, almost all of Montcalm, northern sections of Mirabel, sections of Saint-Adolph-d'Howard, and a portion of Chénéville.

LRHS was built in 1967 and graduated its first class in 1968. It graduates around 150 students a year and has an average of around 900-1100 students each school year. The school motto is Learning and Respect Harvest Success. The rugby team is known as the Celts. The program has grown and produced over 20 young players to represent Québec in the Canadian National Rugby Festival since 2009.

In 1989, the elevator installation.
