= Quebec Route 364 =

Highway in Quebec, Canada

Route 364

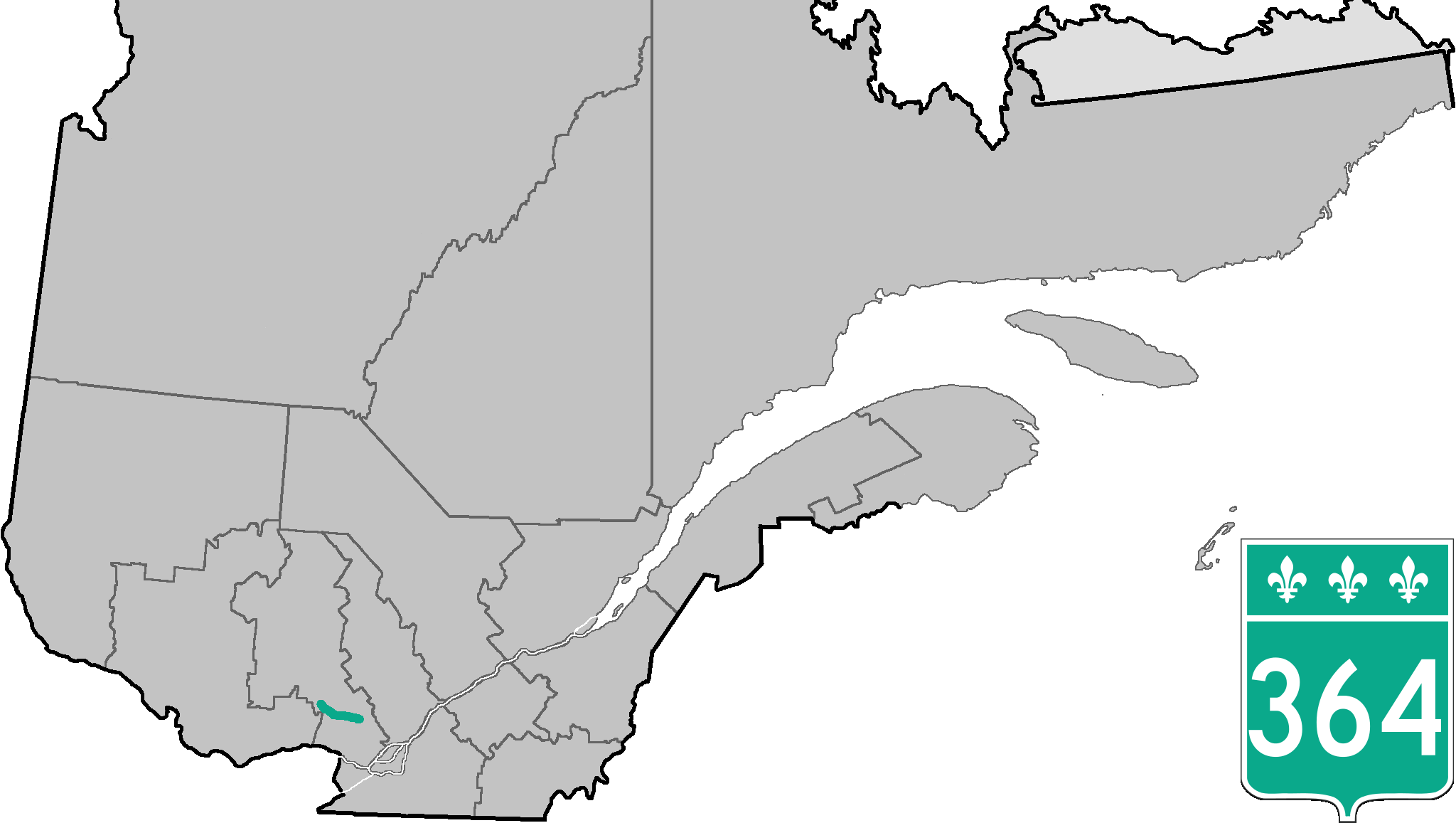

Route information
- Maintained by Transports Québec
- Length: 58.90 km (36.60 mi)

Major junctions
- West end: R-323 in Amherst
- East end: A-15 in Saint-Sauveur

Location
- Country: Canada
- Province: Quebec
- Major cities: Saint-Sauveur, Morin-Heights

Highway system
- Quebec provincial highways; Autoroutes; List; Former
← R-363	→ R-365

Route 364 is a Quebec provincial highway located in the Laurentides region. It runs from the junction of Autoroute 15 in the village of Saint-Sauveur, one of the major touristic villages in the Laurentides and ends in Amherst at the junction of Route 323. It overlaps Route 329 in Morin Heights and Route 327 from Weir to Arundel. Although well-maintained for most of its run, the approaches to Lac-des-Seize-Îles and Weir are marked by severe gradients, tight curves and are considered dangerous.

== Towns along Route 364 ==
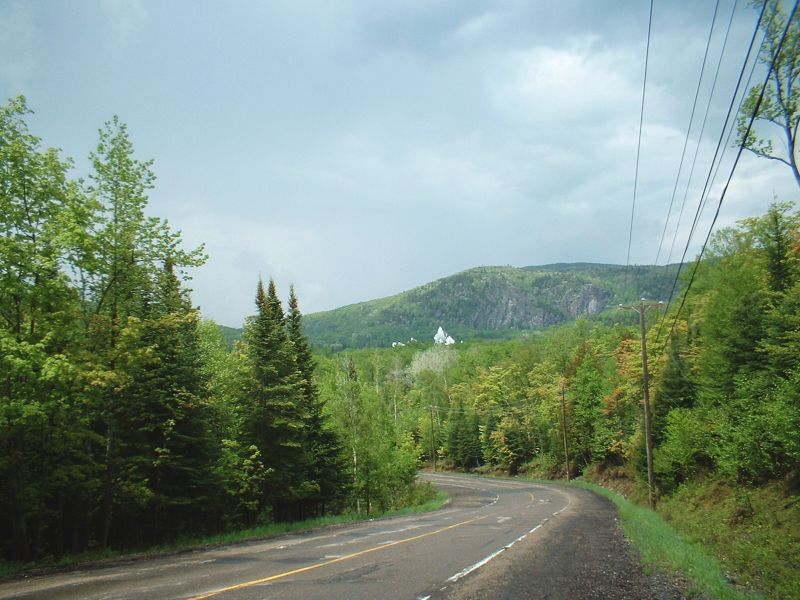
Route 364 near Weir.

- Saint-Sauveur
- Morin-Heights
- Saint-Adolphe-d'Howard
- Montcalm
- Lac-des-Seize-Îles
- Arundel
- Huberdeau
- Amherst

== See also ==
- List of Quebec provincial highways
