= Argenteuil Regional County Municipality =

Argenteuil
- Regional county municipality
- Location in province of Quebec.
- Coordinates: 45°41′N 74°25′W
- Country: Canada
- Province: Quebec
- Region: Laurentides
- Effective: January 1, 1983
- County seat: Lachute

Government
  - Type: Prefecture
  - Prefect: Bernard Bigras-Denis
  - Prefect suppléant: Jason Morrison

Area
  - Total: 1,306.60 km^{2} (504.48 sq mi)
  - Land: 1,252.97 km^{2} (483.77 sq mi)

Population (2016)
  - Total: 32,389
  - Density: 25.8/km^{2} (67/sq mi)
  - Change 2011-2016: ▲0.8%
  - Dwellings: 19,081
- Time zone: UTC−5 (EST)
  - Summer (DST): UTC−4 (EDT)
- Area codes: 450 and 579
- Website: www.argenteuil.qc.ca

Argenteuil (French pronunciation: [aʁʒɑ̃tœj]) is a regional county municipality located in the Laurentides region of Quebec, Canada. Its seat is Lachute.

== History ==
In 1682, Charles-Joseph d'Ailleboust was granted by Louis de Buade de Frontenac, Governor General of New France, a domain of 186 square kilometres (72 sq mi) of land. This fiefdom was bounded by the Ottawa River to the south, a line through the center of the hamlet of Carillon in the west and Clear Lake (Lac Clair) to the north. Since Ailleboust already owned a house in Argenteuil near Paris, he called his domain Argenteuil Seigneury. In 1697, the Lord of Ailleboust and his wife Catherine Le Gardeur sold their seigneury to their son Pierre d'Ailleboust d'Argenteuil. Subsequently, over the years, the fiefdom was held by Pierre-Louis Panet, and then by Major Murray.

After the conquest of New France by the British in 1759 during the Seven Years' War, the British implemented their laws, but maintained certain French seigneurial rights. In 1796, Jedediah Lane, from Jericho, Vermont, bought from Major Murray several thousand acres of land on both sides of the North River (Rivière du Nord), where Lachute is today. In 1809, Thomas Barron bought the land of the territory that would become the center of the town of Lachute. Five years later, Sir John Johnson, a Loyalist from New York who had resettled in Canada after the American Revolution, bought the rest of the Argenteuil Seigneury. He built a sawmill and gave land for churches, helping to attract new settlers to Argenteuil.

In 1854, the Parliament of the Province of Canada abolished the seigneurial system, and the County of Argenteuil was created the following year. In January 1983, the Argenteuil Regional County Municipality succeeded the County of Argenteuil.

== Subdivisions ==
There are 9 subdivisions within the RCM:

Cities (2)

- Lachute
- Brownsburg-Chatham

Municipalities (3)

- Grenville-sur-la-Rouge
- Mille-Isles
- Saint-André-d'Argenteuil

Townships (3)

- Gore
- Harrington
- Wentworth

Villages (1)

- Grenville

== Demographics ==
=== Population ===
Canada census – Argenteuil community profile

	2021	2016	2011
Population	34,752 (+7.3% from 2016)	32,389 (+0.8% from 2011)	32,117 (+7.1% from 2006)
Land area	1,234.69 km^{2} (476.72 sq mi)	1,252.97 km^{2} (483.77 sq mi)	1,251.64 km^{2} (483.26 sq mi)
Population density	28.1/km^{2} (73/sq mi)	25.8/km^{2} (67/sq mi)	25.7/km^{2} (67/sq mi)
Median age	51.2 (M: 50.8, F: 52.0)	49.6 (M: 49.0, F: 50.1)	46.9 (M: 46.4, F: 47.4)
Private dwellings	19,600 (total) 16,223 (occupied)	19,081 (total)	18,352 (total)
Median household income	$62,800	$50,415	$44,453

References: 2021 2016 2011

Historical Census Data - Argenteuil Regional County Municipality, Quebec

Year	Pop.	±%
1991	27,232	—
1996	28,505	+4.7%
1996A	28,568	+0.2%
2001	28,931	+1.3%

Year	Pop.	±%
2006	29,922	+3.4%
2011	32,117	+7.3%
2016	32,389	+0.8%

(A) adjusted to reflect boundary changes.

=== Language ===
Canada Census Mother Tongue - Argenteuil Regional County Municipality, Quebec
Census	Total	French			English			French & English			Other		
Year	Responses	Count	Trend	Pop %	Count	Trend	Pop %	Count	Trend	Pop %	Count	Trend	Pop %
2016	31,905	26,010	▲1.4%	81.5%	4,820	▼4.1%	15.1%	425	▲1.1%	1.3%	650	▲16.1%	2.0%
2011	31,655	25,650	▲9.7%	81.03%	5,025	▼2.0%	15.87%	420	▲27.3%	1.33%	560	▼10.4%	1.77%
2006	29,460	23,375	▲5.6%	79.35%	5,130	▼2.4%	17.41%	330	▼10.8%	1.12%	625	▲31.6%	2.12%
2001	28,230	22,130	▲2.8%	78.39%	5,255	▼10.8%	18.62%	370	▲42.3%	1.31%	475	▲3.3%	1.68%
1996	28,135	21,525	n/a	76.51%	5,890	n/a	20.93%	260	n/a	0.92%	460	n/a	1.64%

== Transportation ==
=== Access Routes ===
Highways and numbered routes that run through the municipality, including external routes that start or finish at the county border:

- Autoroutes
  - A-50
- Principal Highways
  - R-148
  - R-158
- Secondary Highways
  - R-327
  - R-329
  - R-344
- External Routes
  - None

== Attractions ==
- Argenteuil Regional Museum (Saint-André-d'Argenteuil)
- Carillon Canal
- Caserne-de-Carillon National Historic site (Carillon Barracks)
- Lachute Airport (Lachute)

== See also ==
- List of regional county municipalities and equivalent territories in Quebec
