= Montcalm, Quebec =

Montcalm
- Municipality
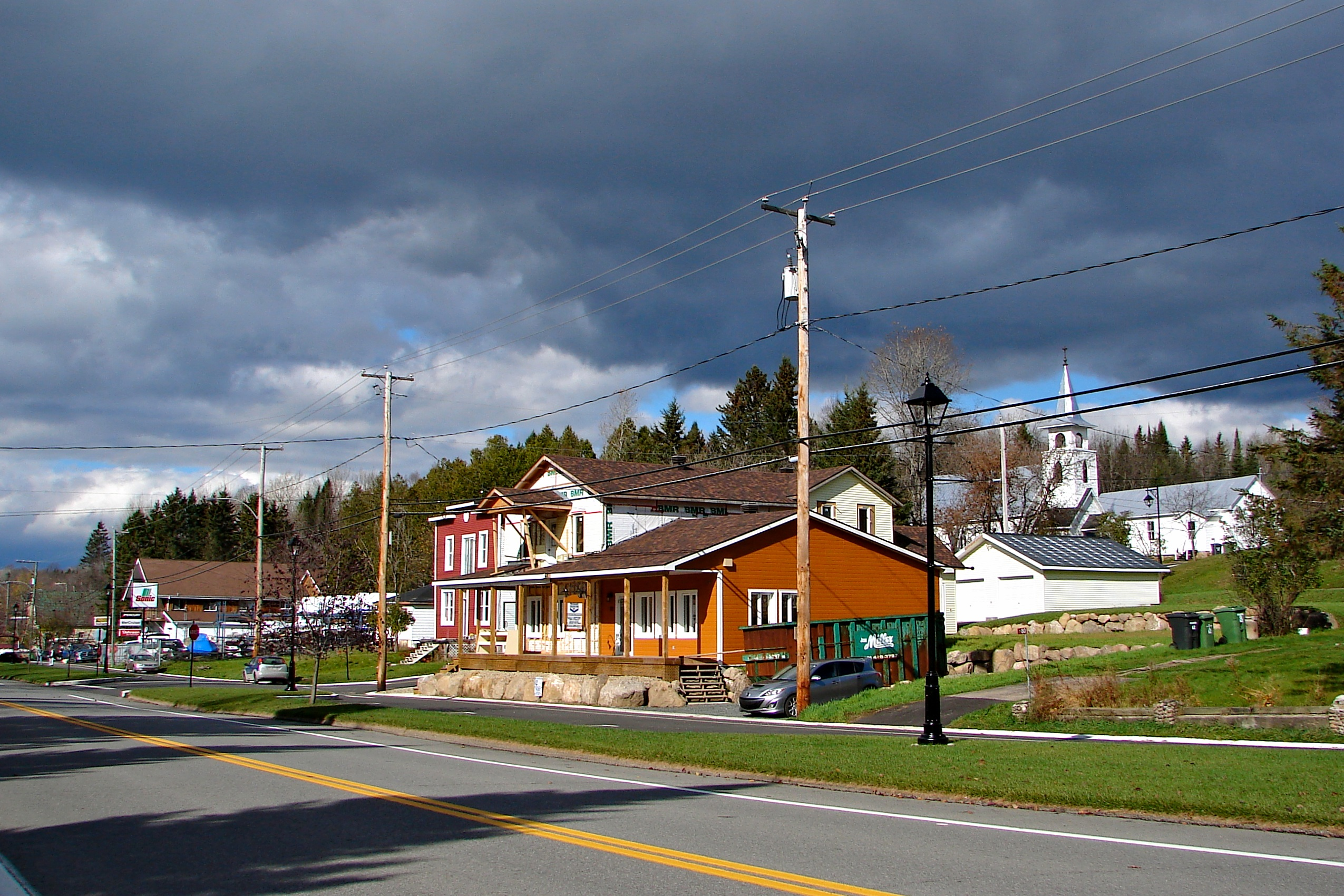
- Weir

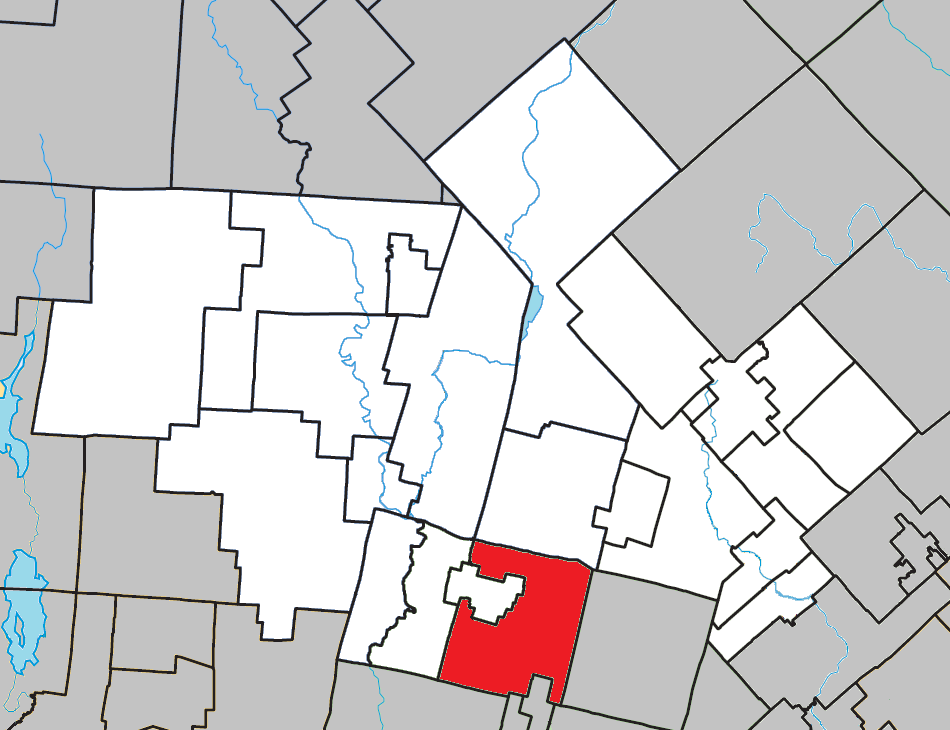
- Location within Les Laurentides RCM

- Location in central Quebec
- Coordinates: 45°58′N 74°30′W
- Country: Canada
- Province: Quebec
- Region: Laurentides
- RCM: Les Laurentides
- Constituted: March 6, 1907

Government
  - Mayor: Steven Larose
  - Fed. riding: Laurentides—Labelle
  - Prov. riding: Argenteuil

Area
  - Total: 128.5 km^{2} (49.6 sq mi)
  - Land: 117.71 km^{2} (45.45 sq mi)

Population (2021)
  - Total: 632
  - Density: 5.4/km^{2} (14/sq mi)
  - Change 2016-21: ▲0.6%
  - Dwellings: 627
- Time zone: UTC−5 (EST)
  - Summer (DST): UTC−4 (EDT)
- Postal code(s): J0T 2V0
- Area code(s): 819
- Highways: R-327 R-364
- Website: www.municipalite.montcalm.qc.ca

Montcalm (French pronunciation: [mɔ̃kalm]) is a municipality in the Les Laurentides Regional County Municipality in the Laurentides region of the province of Quebec, Canada, southeast of Mont-Tremblant. The main population centre in Montcalm is the village of Weir.

== History ==
The Township Municipality of Montcalm was established in 1907 when it separated from the Municipality of Harrington-et-Union. The municipality was named after the geographic township of Montcalm, named in turn after Louis-Joseph de Montcalm. In 1992, the township municipality changed statutes to became a (regular) municipality.

== Geography ==
=== Weir ===
Weir (45°56′42″N 74°32′58″W) is an unincorporated village in Montcalm, accessible via Quebec Route 364. It is home to a satellite earth station for Tata Communications (Canada) Ltd.

Weir is named after William Alexander Weir (1858-1929), a Quebec politician and judge.

== Demographics ==
Historical census populations – Montcalm, Quebec

Year	Pop.	±%
1911	401	—
1921	214	−46.6%
1931	291	+36.0%
1941	325	+11.7%
1951	300	−7.7%
1956	271	−9.7%
1961	251	−7.4%

Year	Pop.	±%
1966	234	−6.8%
1971	246	+5.1%
1976	217	−11.8%
1981	294	+35.5%
1986	310	+5.4%
1991	369	+19.0%
1996	449	+21.7%

Year	Pop.	±%
2001	534	+18.9%
2006	652	+22.1%
2011	619	−5.1%
2016	628	+1.5%
2021	632	+0.6%

Source: Statistics Canada

Private dwellings occupied by usual residents (2021): 330 (total dwellings: 627)

Mother tongue (2021):

- English as first language: 19.7%
- French as first language: 73.2%
- English and French as first languages: 3.1%
- Other as first language: 3.1%

== Education ==
Sir Wilfrid Laurier School Board operates English-language schools:

- Arundel Elementary School in Arundel
- Laurentian Regional High School in Lachute serves almost all of Montcalm

== See also ==
- List of anglophone communities in Quebec
