= Lachute =

- City
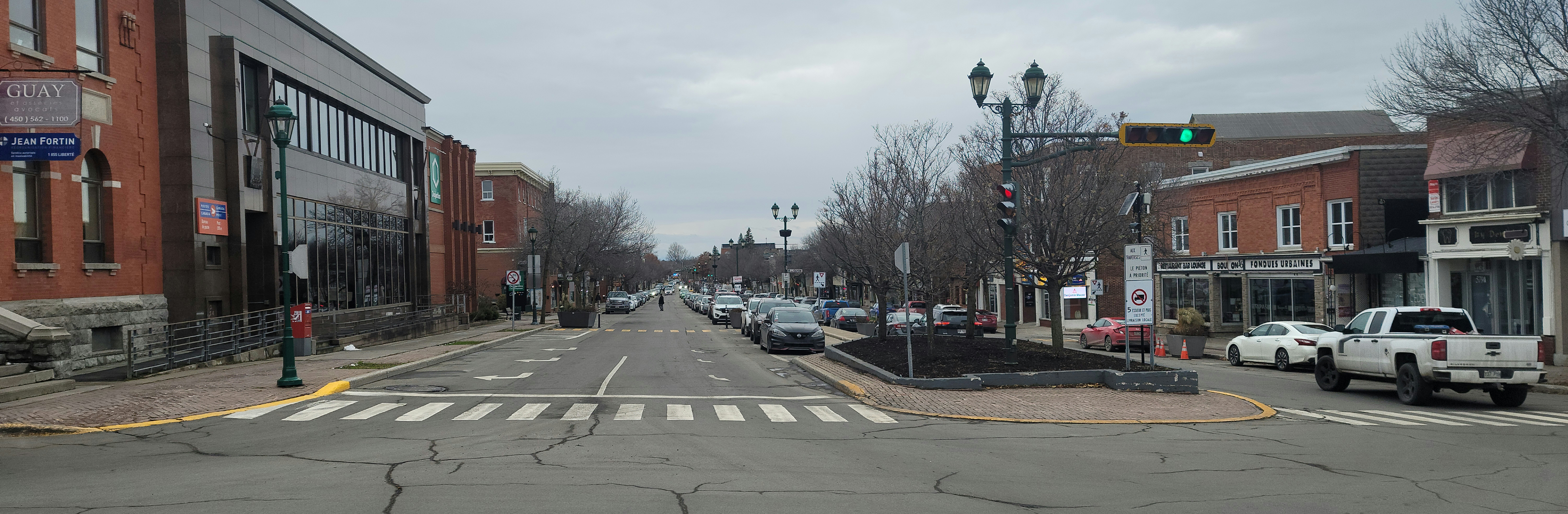
- Lachute from Route 148

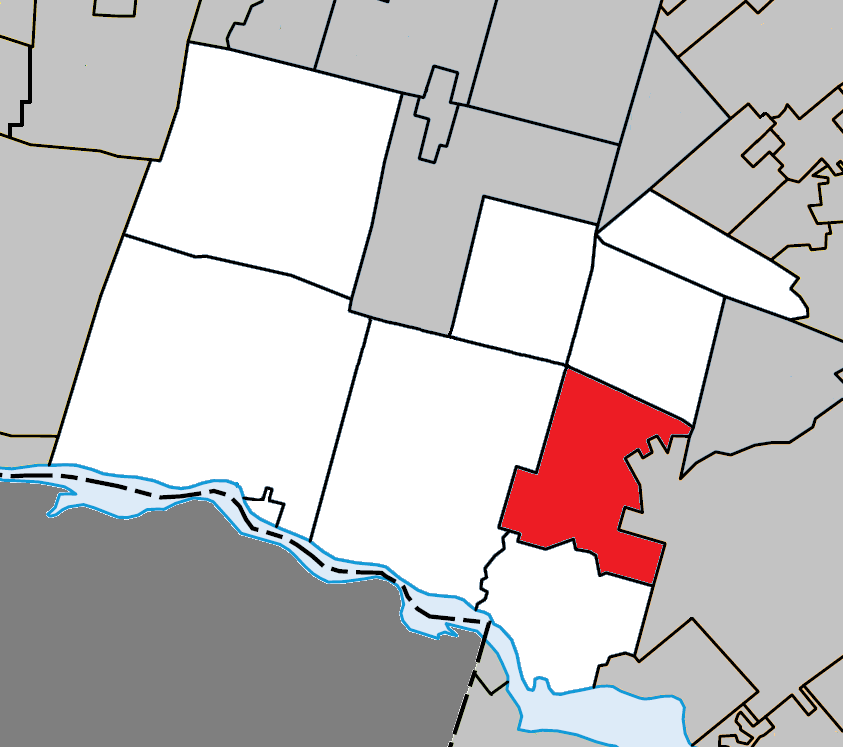
- Location within Argenteuil RCM

- Location in central Quebec
- Coordinates: 45°39′N 74°20′W
- Country: Canada
- Province: Quebec
- Region: Laurentides
- RCM: Argenteuil
- Settled: 1753
- Constituted: April 30, 1966

Government
  - Mayor: Bernard Bigras-Denis
  - Federal riding: Argenteuil—La Petite-Nation
  - Prov. riding: Argenteuil

Area
  - City: 112.84 km^{2} (43.57 sq mi)
  - Land: 108.66 km^{2} (41.95 sq mi)
  - Urban: 9.59 km^{2} (3.70 sq mi)

Population (2021)
  - City: 14,100
  - Density: 129.8/km^{2} (336/sq mi)
  - Urban: 11,221
  - Urban density: 1,169.8/km^{2} (3,030/sq mi)
  - Pop 2016–2021: ▲9.6%
  - Dwellings: 6,862
- Time zone: UTC−5 (EST)
  - Summer (DST): UTC−4 (EDT)
- Postal code(s): J8H
- Area codes: 450 and 579
- Highways A-50: R-148 R-158; R-327 R-329
- Website: www.ville.lachute.qc.ca

Lachute (French pronunciation: [laʃyt]) is a town in southwest Quebec, Canada, 82.2 km (51.1 mi) northwest of Montreal, on the Rivière du Nord, a tributary of the Ottawa River, and west of the Mirabel International Airport. It is located on Autoroute 50, at the junctions of Quebec Provincial Highways Route 148, Route 158, and Secondary Highways 327 and 329.

Lachute is the seat of Argenteuil Regional County Municipality. It also has a local airport: Lachute Airport. Its major industries include paper mills, lumber and various manufacturing plants. The population is just over 14,000 people.

== History ==
Originally in the 17th century, "La Chute" identified a cataract or falls on the North River (Rivière du Nord) located about 24 km (15 mi) upstream from its confluence with the Ottawa River. In 1753, Antoine Brunet became the first francophone to settle in Lachute, temporarily. In 1796, Jedediah Lane, from Jericho, Vermont, bought several thousand acres of land on both sides of the North River, where Lachute is today. That same year, Hezekiah Clark and his family, also of Jericho, settled near the falls on the North River, followed by Loyalists fleeing the American Revolution. Two years later, the population of The Chute settlement (as it was then known by its English name) consisted of five families.

The village grew quickly; by 1803, 30 families were scattered on both banks of the North River, and by 1810, Lachute counted 83 families, including 211 children of school age. In 1804, a mill was built at the falls and the first general store opened in 1813. One year later, Sir John Johnson bought a large part of the Argenteuil Seigneury. Johnson built a sawmill and gave land for the construction of churches, helping to attract new settlers to Argenteuil. In 1825, Thomas Barron became the first judge, then the first mayor of Lachute. The Lachute post office was established in 1835.

From 1870 to 1880, Lachute went through another period of expansion, both in economic and social development; the railway linking Montreal and Ottawa was built through the centre of the small town. Industries were established: Félix Hamelin and Thomas Henry Ayers established a wool mill and Irishman James Crocket Wilson opened a paper mill.

In 1885, the Town of Lachute was incorporated with a population around 1300 persons, and in the same year, Lachute high school was founded. In 1901, electricity was brought to the town.

In January, 1892, a fire destroyed 300 of the 400 homes in Lachute.

In 1966, Lachute and the Village of Ayersville merged, forming the Cité de Lachute. In 1971, during the construction of Montréal-Mirabel International Airport, a part of the Saint-Jérusalem Parish was added to Lachute. In 1981, Cité de Lachute became Ville de Lachute. In 2000, about 10 km^{2} (3.9 sq mi) of Mirabel's territory were annexed by Lachute. In 2002, the Service de police municipale de Lachute was transferred to the Sûreté du Québec.

The Expo Lachute Fair is the oldest fair in Quebec and the second-oldest in all of Canada, running from 1825 to the present. In 1917, the Argenteuil Agricultural Society purchased land to hold the Expo Lachute Fair permanently in Lachute. In 1917, the construction of the grandstand and the track was completed, with new cattle and horse barns being constructed as time and money allowed. The Fall Fair was changed to a Spring Fair in 1925 so that it could be deemed strictly a livestock show. Lachute was not always host to the exhibition; from 1825 to 1826, inhabitants of the county of York met in the then-bustling business centre of St. Andrews, to form a society called the County of York Agricultural Society, later changed to the Two Mountains Agricultural Society, and finally the Argenteuil Agricultural Society. Today, the Expo Lachute Fair is still popular. An annual agriculture fair is held in July and the Fall Derby is in September. The fairgrounds are also used for several other local events throughout the year.

== Geography ==
=== Climate ===
Climate data for Lachute (1981–2010)
| Month | Jan | Feb | Mar | Apr | May | Jun | Jul | Aug | Sep | Oct | Nov | Dec | Year |
|---|---|---|---|---|---|---|---|---|---|---|---|---|---|
| Record high °C (°F) | 10.5 (50.9) | 12.5 (54.5) | 20.5 (68.9) | 31 (88) | 32.2 (90.0) | 35 (95) | 34.4 (93.9) | 35.5 (95.9) | 32.5 (90.5) | 27.2 (81.0) | 20 (68) | 13.5 (56.3) | 35.5 (95.9) |
| Mean daily maximum °C (°F) | −6.1 (21.0) | −3.5 (25.7) | 2.3 (36.1) | 11.3 (52.3) | 18.8 (65.8) | 23.8 (74.8) | 26 (79) | 24.9 (76.8) | 20.0 (68.0) | 12.4 (54.3) | 4.9 (40.8) | −2.5 (27.5) | 11.0 (51.8) |
| Daily mean °C (°F) | −10.7 (12.7) | −8.6 (16.5) | −2.6 (27.3) | 6.0 (42.8) | 12.9 (55.2) | 18.0 (64.4) | 20.4 (68.7) | 19.3 (66.7) | 14.7 (58.5) | 7.7 (45.9) | 1.3 (34.3) | −6.5 (20.3) | 6.0 (42.8) |
| Mean daily minimum °C (°F) | −15.4 (4.3) | −13.6 (7.5) | −7.5 (18.5) | 0.7 (33.3) | 6.9 (44.4) | 12.2 (54.0) | 14.7 (58.5) | 13.7 (56.7) | 9.2 (48.6) | 3.1 (37.6) | −2.4 (27.7) | −10.4 (13.3) | 0.9 (33.6) |
| Record low °C (°F) | −37 (−35) | −35 (−31) | −30.5 (−22.9) | −15 (5) | −6.7 (19.9) | −1.5 (29.3) | 3.5 (38.3) | 0 (32) | −5 (23) | −8.9 (16.0) | −20.6 (−5.1) | −34.5 (−30.1) | −37 (−35) |
| Average precipitation mm (inches) | 91.2 (3.59) | 69.7 (2.74) | 72.9 (2.87) | 87.5 (3.44) | 96.4 (3.80) | 115.0 (4.53) | 100.2 (3.94) | 103.6 (4.08) | 107.6 (4.24) | 110.1 (4.33) | 106.3 (4.19) | 90.1 (3.55) | 1,150.5 (45.30) |
Source: Environment Canada

== Demographics ==
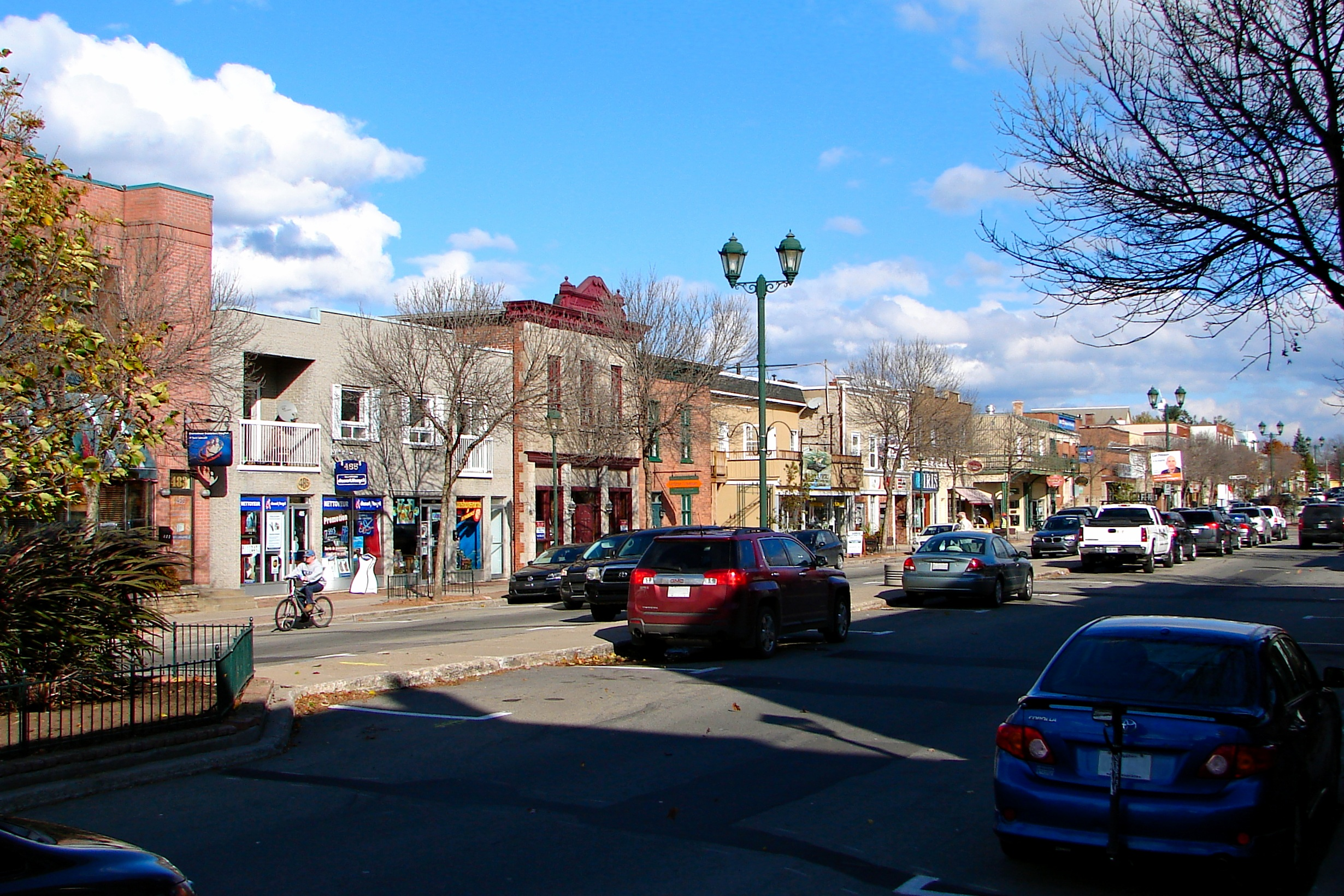
Town centre of Lachute

In the 2021 Census of Population conducted by Statistics Canada, Lachute had a population of 14,100 living in 6,531 of its 6,862 total private dwellings, a change of 9.6% from its 2016 population of 12,862. With a land area of 108.66 km^{2} (41.95 sq mi), it had a population density of 129.8/km^{2} (336.1/sq mi) in 2021.

Canada census – Lachute community profile

| | 2021 | 2016 | 2011 |
| Population | 14,100 (+9.6% from 2016) | 12,862 (+2.5% from 2011) | 12,551 (+6.1% from 2006) |
| Land area | 108.66 km^{2} (41.95 sq mi) | 109.96 km^{2} (42.46 sq mi) | 109.20 km^{2} (42.16 sq mi) |
| Population density | 129.8/km^{2} (336/sq mi) | 117.0/km^{2} (303/sq mi) | 114.9/km^{2} (298/sq mi) |
| Median age | 50.4 (M: 48.0, F: 52.8) | 49.3 (M: 47.0, F: 51.1) | 47.1 (M: 45.6, F: 48.4) |
| Private dwellings | 6,862 (total) 6,531 (occupied) | 6,403 (total) | 5,991 (total) |
| Median household income | $56,400 | $44,681 | $40,516 |

References: 2021 2016 2011

Historical Census Data – Lachute, Quebec

| Year | Pop. | ±% |
|---|---|---|
| 1891 | 1,751 | — |
| 1901 | 2,022 | +15.5% |
| 1911 | 2,407 | +19.0% |
| 1921 | 2,592 | +7.7% |
| 1931 | 3,906 | +50.7% |
| 1941 | 5,310 | +35.9% |
| 1951 | 6,179 | +16.4% |

| Year | Pop. | ±% |
|---|---|---|
| 1956 | 6,911 | +11.8% |
| 1961 | 7,560 | +9.4% |
| 1966 | 10,215 | +35.1% |
| 1971 | 12,004 | +17.5% |
| 1976 | 11,928 | −0.6% |
| 1981 | 11,729 | −1.7% |
| 1986 | 11,586 | −1.2% |

| Year | Pop. | ±% |
|---|---|---|
| 1991 | 11,730 | +1.2% |
| 1996 | 11,493 | −2.0% |
| 2001 | 11,628 | +1.2% |
| 2006 | 11,832 | +1.8% |
| 2011 | 12,551 | +6.1% |
| 2016 | 12,862 | +2.5% |
| 2021 | 14,100 | +9.6% |

Population counts are not adjusted for boundary changes or mergers.
Source: Statistics Canada

Canada Census Mother Tongue – Lachute, Quebec
| Census | Total | French | | | English | | | French & English | | | Other | | |
| Year | Responses | Count | Trend | Pop % | Count | Trend | Pop % | Count | Trend | Pop % | Count | Trend | Pop % |
| 2021 | 13,820 | 11,855 | ▲9.5% | 85.8% | 1,275 | ▼2.7% | 9.2% | 410 | ▲148.5% | 3.0% | 230 | ▲53.3% | 1.7% |
| 2016 | 12,475 | 10,830 | ▲1.2% | 86.8% | 1,310 | 0.0% | 10.5% | 165 | ▲23.1% | 1.3% | 150 | ▼6.3% | 1.2% |
| 2011 | 12,305 | 10,705 | ▲6.2% | 87.0% | 1,310 | ▲7.3% | 10.7% | 130 | ▲23.1% | 1.1% | 160 | ▼5.9% | 1.3% |
| 2006 | 11,525 | 10,040 | ▲4.3% | 87.1% | 1,215 | ▼10.0% | 10.5% | 100 | ▼13.0% | 0.9% | 170 | ▲29.4% | 1.5% |
| 2001 | 11,195 | 9,610 | ▲3.1% | 85.8% | 1,350 | ▼23.1% | 12.1% | 115 | ▲21.7% | 1.0% | 120 | ▼17.2% | 1.1% |
| 1996 | 11,300 | 9,310 | n/a | 82.4% | 1,755 | n/a | 15.5% | 90 | n/a | 0.8% | 145 | n/a | 1.3% |

== Government ==
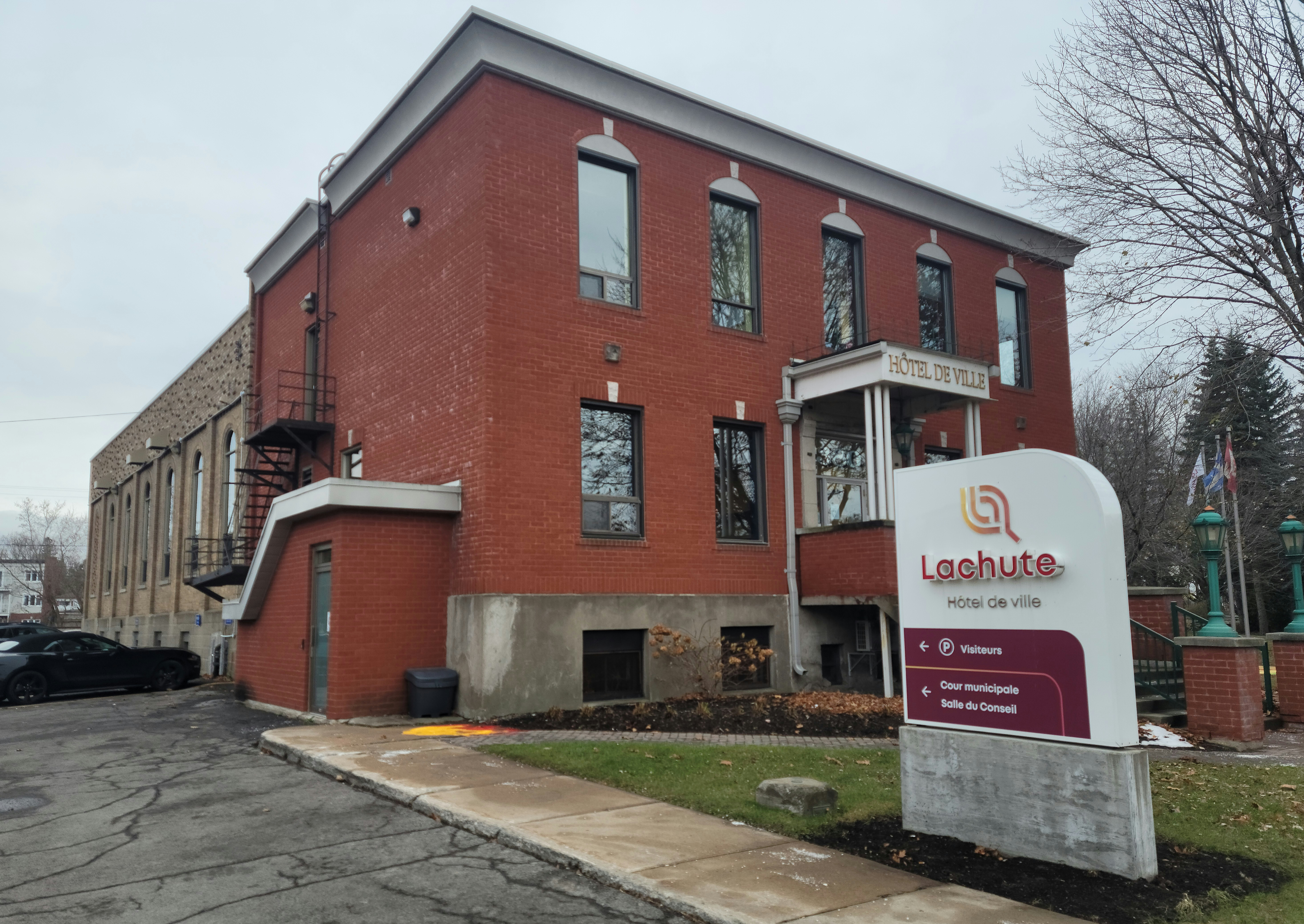
View of Lachute City Hall on Main Street

List of former mayors:

- Daniel Mayer (...–2013)
- Carl Péloquin (2013–2021)
- Bernard Bigras-Denis (2021–present)

== Education ==
The Commission scolaire de la Rivière-du-Nord operates French-language public schools.

- École l'Oasis
- École Saint-Alexandre
- École Saint-Julien
- École Polyvalente Lavigne

Sir Wilfrid Laurier School Board operates English-language public schools:

- Laurentian Elementary School
- Laurentian Regional High School

== Media ==
- CJLA-FM (Planète Lov 104,9) – an adult contemporary formatted station.

== Notable people ==
- John Lavis
- Salem Bland, Methodist theologian and Social Gospel leader.
- Kevin Lowe, former NHL defenceman and current vice-chairman of the Edmonton Oilers.
- Jim Watson, former Member of Provincial Parliament (MPP) for the riding of Ottawa West—Nepean and Minister of Municipal Affairs and Housing; former Mayor of Ottawa, Ontario. The Hon. Mayor Watson is a member of the Ontario Liberal Party.
- William Augustus Leggo, 1830-1915, inventor of the Leggotype process.
- Claire Lepage, 1960s pop singer.
- Pierre Pagé, former coach of several NHL hockey teams (Calgary, Minnesota, Quebec and Anaheim), and currently head coach of Eisbären Berlin (Berlin Polar Bears) of the Deutsche Eishockey Liga.
- Thain Wendell MacDowell, Victoria Cross Recipient 1917, Vimy Ridge, France.
- Bob Paulson, 23rd Commissioner of the RCMP; Commander of the National Security Criminal Investigations Unit.

== See also ==
- List of cities in Quebec
- Rev. Henry Flesher Bland
