= Sainte-Anne-des-Lacs =

- Parish municipality
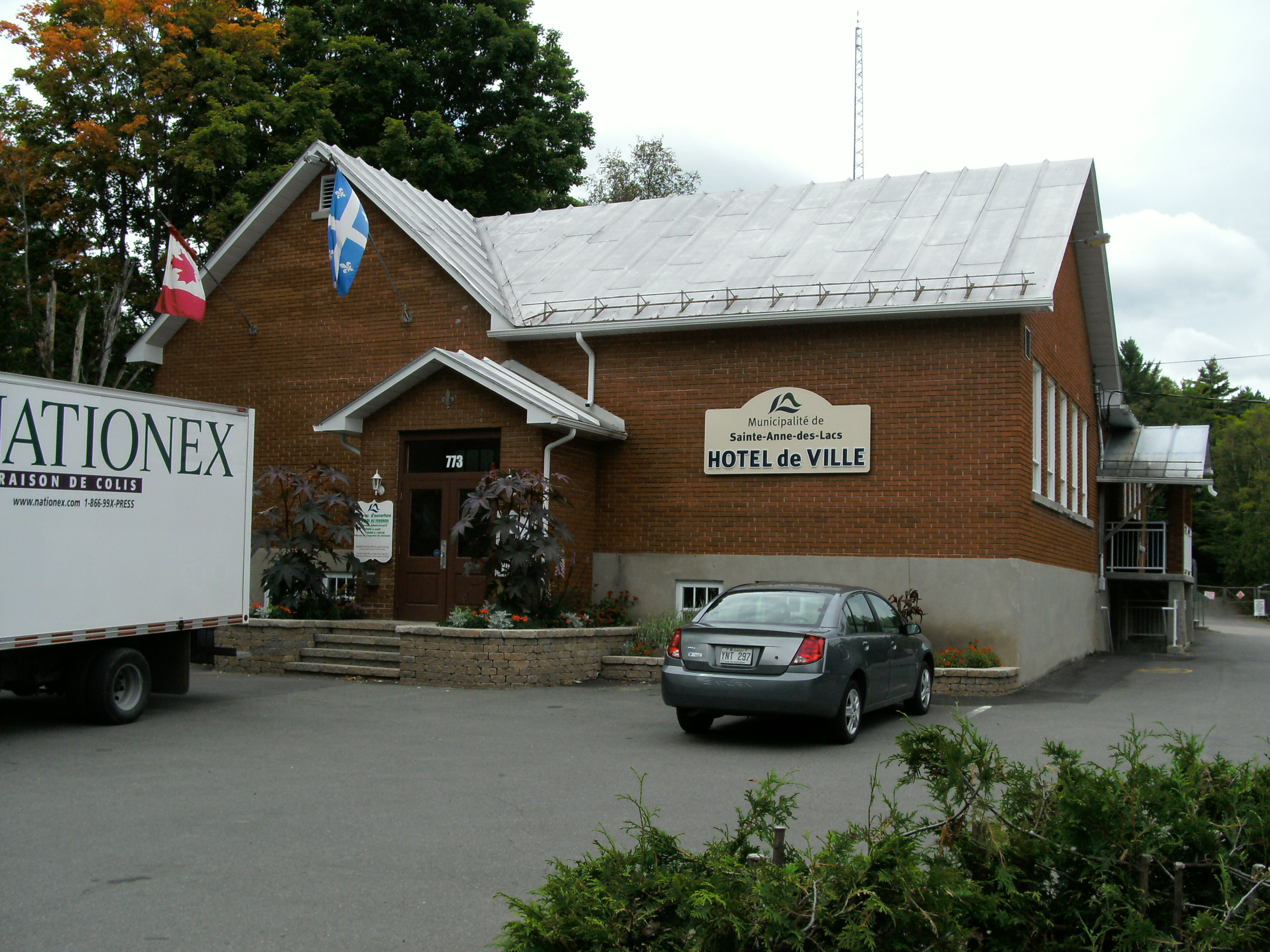
- Town hall

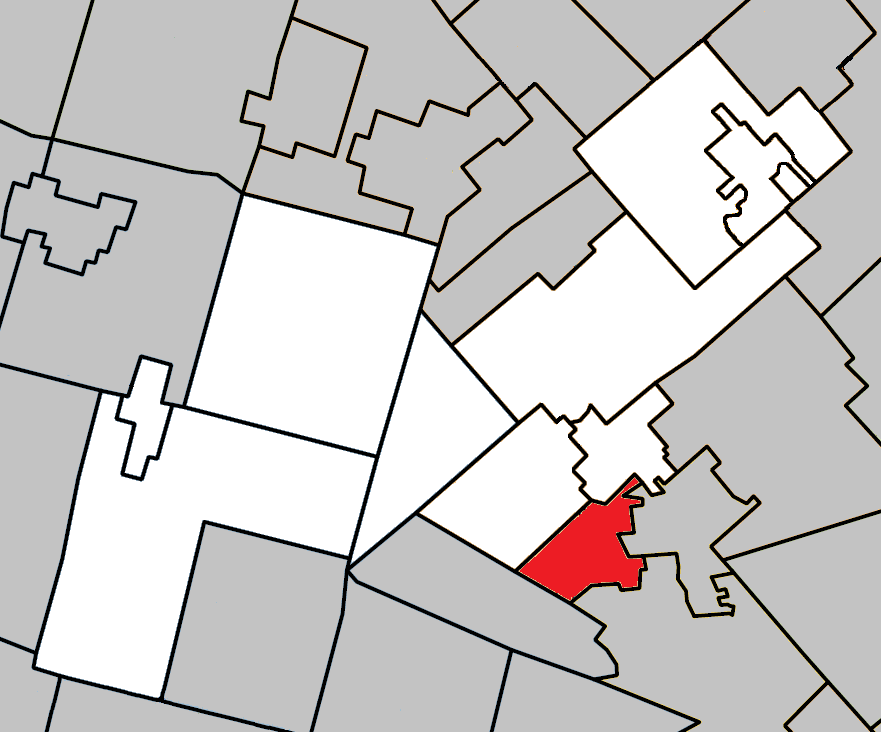
- Location within Les Pays-d'en-Haut RCM

- Location in central Quebec
- Coordinates: 45°51′N 74°08′W
- Country: Canada
- Province: Quebec
- Region: Laurentides
- RCM: Les Pays-d'en-Haut
- Constituted: March 28, 1946

Government
  - Mayor: John Dalzell
  - Federal riding: Les Pays-d'en-Haut
  - Prov. riding: Bertrand

Area
  - Total: 27.48 km^{2} (10.61 sq mi)
  - Land: 24.65 km^{2} (9.52 sq mi)

Population (2021)
  - Total: 3,862
  - Density: 156.7/km^{2} (406/sq mi)
  - Pop (2016–21): ▲7.0%
  - Dwellings: 2,232
- Time zone: UTC−5 (EST)
  - Summer (DST): UTC−4 (EDT)
- Postal code(s): J0R 1B0
- Area codes: 450 and 579
- Highways A-15 (TCH): R-117
- Website: www.sadl.qc.ca

Sainte-Anne-des-Lacs (French pronunciation: [sɛ̃t an de lak]) is a municipality in the regional county municipality of Les Pays-d'en-Haut in Quebec, Canada, located in the administrative region of Laurentides. The Roman Catholic parish of Sainte-Anne-des-Lacs was founded in 1940, while the municipality was founded in 1946.

== History ==
Sainte-Anne-des-Lacs was originally part of Saint-Sauveur. The origins of Sainte-Anne-des-Lacs date back to the time of colonisation in the 19th century, when people migrated from the St. Lawrence Valley to the lands north of Montreal. Descendants of the first families are still present in Sainte-Anne-des-Lacs. At the turn of the century, the first tourists were mostly Protestant Anglophones from Montreal. They settled mainly around Lac Marois, where they built the first church in 1911: Lac Marois Country Church.

As for worship by French-speaking Catholics, it was not until the 1920s that the construction of a chapel began, financed entirely by the residents of Sainte-Anne-des-Lacs. It was not until twenty years later, on 10 May 1940, that the Archbishop of Montreal, Mgr Georges Gauthier, conferred on the ‘desserte de Sainte-Anne’ all the rights and privileges granted to parish organisations. The parish of Sainte-Anne-des-Lacs thus became a tangible reality, confirming the existence of a long-established autonomous community. That was all it took for the 300 or so permanent residents of Sainte-Anne-des-Lacs to call for the creation of a separate municipality. In 1946, the Quebec legislature passed a law creating the municipality of Sainte-Anne-des-Lacs, definitively separating the territory from Saint-Sauveur.

Some of the municipality's districts and resorts take their names from Lac Guindon, Lac des Seigneurs, Lac Marois and Lac Ouimet.

== Demographics ==
In the 2021 Census of Population conducted by Statistics Canada, Sainte-Anne-des-Lacs had a population of 3,862 living in 1,792 of its 2,232 total private dwellings, a change of 7% from its 2016 population of 3,611. With a land area of 24.65 km^{2} (9.52 sq mi), it had a population density of 156.7/km^{2} (405.8/sq mi) in 2021.

Historical census populations – Sainte-Anne-des-Lacs

Year	Pop.	±%
1951	343	—
1956	343	+0.0%
1961	343	+0.0%
1966	467	+36.2%
1971	522	+11.8%

Year	Pop.	±%
1976	735	+40.8%
1981	1,047	+42.4%
1986	1,100	+5.1%
1991	1,591	+44.6%
1996	2,236	+40.5%

Year	Pop.	±%
2001	2,511	+12.3%
2006	3,029	+20.6%
2011	3,363	+11.0%
2016	3,611	+7.4%
2021	3,862	+7.0%

Source: Statistics Canada

Private dwellings occupied by usual residents (2021): 1,792 (total dwellings: 2,232)

Mother tongue (2021):

- English as first language: 7.4%
- French as first language: 86.4%
- English and French as first language: 2.1%
- Other as first language: 3.6%

== Attractions ==
=== Lac Marois Country Club ===
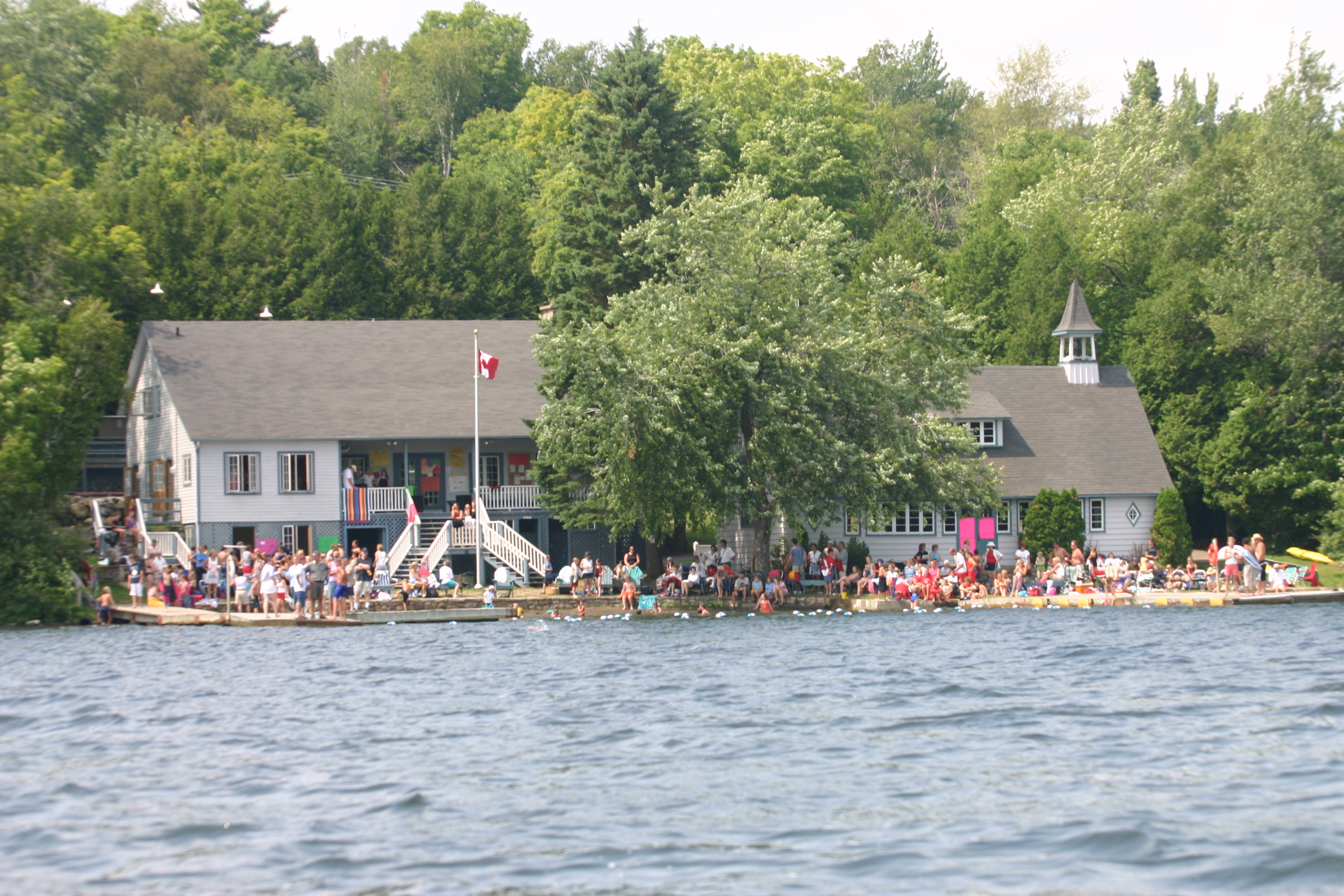
Swim Meet at the Lac Marois Country Club

The Lac Marois Country Club, located on the shores of Lac Marois, is a members only club open from late June to the end of August.

Outdoor church services began in 1903. Land was donated in 1910 and the Lac Marois Union Church was built the following year. The Lac Marois Country Club came into being in 1929, as a means to fulfill more than spiritual needs, and requested the church grant them the right to build a clubhouse on church property.

The Union Church owns the property and leases the land to the Interlake Youth Club, the parent company of the Lac Marois Country Club.

At L.M.C.C. (Lac Marois Country Club), children can take lessons. Lessons include swimming (lessons and swimteam), tennis, sailing, canoeing, and junior club.

== Government ==
- Mayor: John Dalzell
- Member of Parliament: Tim Watchorn (Liberal).
- Member of the National Assembly of Quebec: France-Élaine Duranceau (CAQ).

== Infrastructure ==
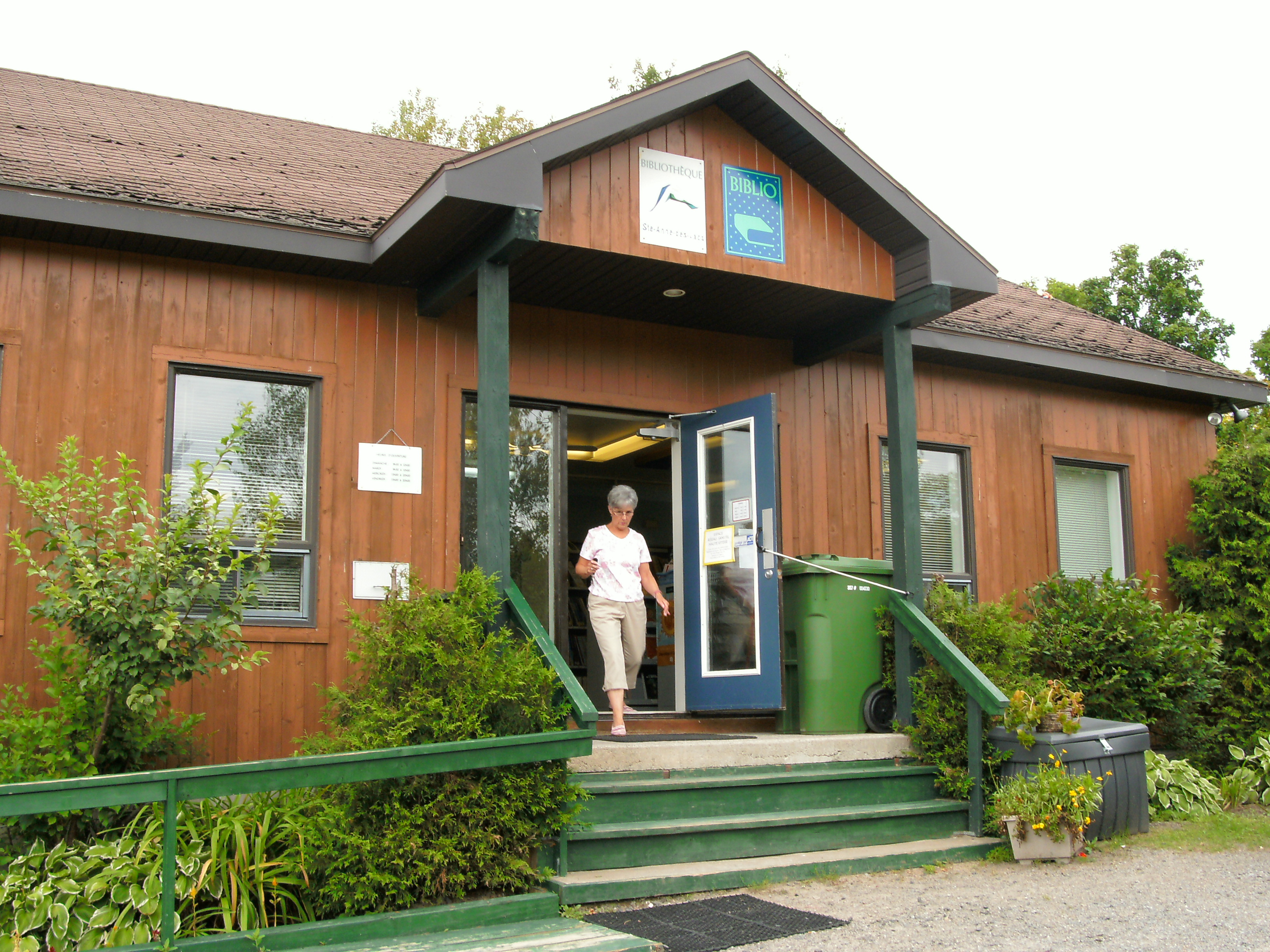
Public library, Sainte-Anne-des-Lacs

The postal code for Sainte-Anne-des-Lacs is J0R 1B0. The municipality is served by a post office located inside a building supplies store and two rural routes.

Telephone service is provided through a Bell Canada telephone exchange at Prévost.

Police services are provided by the Sûreté du Québec, Quebec's provincial police force, and were formerly provided by the Régie intermunicipale de police de la Rivière-du-Nord, which also served Piedmont, Prévost and some other communities in the Laurentians.

The Municipality has its own fire department. A new fire station building near the town hall was expected to be open in July 2015.

== Education ==
Sir Wilfrid Laurier School Board operates Anglophone public schools:

- Morin Heights Elementary School in Morin-Heights serves a portion of the town
- Laurentian Regional High School in Lachute

== See also ==
- Lake Guindon
- List of parish municipalities in Quebec
