= Canadian House of Commons Standing Committee on National Defence =

Standing committee of the House of Commons of Canada

The House of Commons Standing Committee on National Defence (NDDN) is a standing committee of the House of Commons of Canada. Prior to 2007, it was the House of Commons Standing Committee on National Defence and Veterans' Affairs.

== Mandate ==
The House of Commons Standing Committee on National Defence is a permanent committee established by the Standing Orders, the written rules under which the House of Commons regulates its proceedings. It is mandated to review all matters pertaining to the Department of National Defence ("the department") and the Canadian Armed Forces. It may examine and report on matters referred to it by the House of Commons or it may undertake studies on its own initiative.

The National Defence Act established the Department of National Defence and the Canadian Armed Forces – the Canadian Army, the Royal Canadian Navy and Royal Canadian Air Force – as two separate entities operating in close cooperation under the authority of the Minister of National Defence. National Defence Headquarters is a "combined" headquarters consisting of both military and civilian personnel. The Standing Committee on National Defence is responsible for examining legislation, activities, and expenditures of the Department of National Defence and the Canadian Armed Forces, as well as the effectiveness of related policies and programs.

When examining legislation or undertaking a particular study, the Committee may hear from a variety of witnesses including the Minister, relevant departmental and Canadian Armed Forces personnel, academics, subject matter specialists, stakeholders, Ministers and officials from other departments, and members of the public at large.

Order in Council Appointments, whereby individuals are appointed to certain senior posts within the Department of National Defence and the Canadian Armed Forces, are referred to the committee after they have been tabled in the House of Commons. Within thirty sitting days of this referral, the Committee may choose to examine the qualifications and competence of these appointees in relation to the posts to which they have been appointed. If the committee decides to present a report to the House, the report will ordinarily state that the committee has reviewed the appointment or nomination and whether or not the committee finds the person qualified and competent to perform the duties of the office.

The committee is also empowered to study and report the following agencies and other independent bodies:

Defence Research and Development Canada* Office of the Chief Military Judge* Communications Security Establishment Canada* Office of the Communications Security Establishment Commissioner* Military Grievances External Review Committee (formerly known as the Canadian Forces Grievance Board)* Military Police Complaints Commission* Office of the Ombudsman for the Department of National Defence and the Canadian Forces National Search and Rescue Secretariat

- These bodies operate as independent units within the defence portfolio. The other agencies report to Parliament through the Minister of National Defence.

For procedural information regarding the mandate and power of committees please consult the relevant section in the Compendium of House of Commons Procedure.

- Matters pertaining to the Department of National Defence
- Care of ill and injured Canadian Forces members
- Maintaining the readiness of the Canadian Forces

== History ==
Until 1986, the Standing Committee on External Affairs and National Defence was responsible for examining defence policy. One result of the Canadian parliamentary reforms implemented during the 1980s was the establishment of a separate Standing Committee on National Defence in 1986.

In 1989, Veterans Affairs was added to the mandate of the committee, and it was renamed the Standing Committee on National Defence and Veterans Affairs. However, on April 5, 2006, at the beginning of the 39th Parliament, the House of Commons adopted a motion which amended its Standing Orders to, among other things, divide the areas of responsibility and establish both a Standing Committee on National Defence and a Standing Committee on Veterans Affairs.

== Membership ==
As of the 45th Canadian Parliament:

Party	Member	District
Liberal	Charles Sousa, chair	Mississauga—Lakeshore, ON
Conservative	James Bezan, vice chair	Selkirk-Interlake-Eastman, MB
Bloc Quebecois	Simon-Pierre Savard-Tremblay, vice chair	Saint-Hyacinthe—Bagot—Acton, QC
Conservative	Scott Anderson	Vernon—Lake Country—Monashee, BC
Conservative	Cheryl Gallant	Algonquin—Renfrew—Pembroke, ON
Conservative	Jeff Kibble	Cowichan—Malahat—Langford, BC
Liberal	Viviane Lapointe	Sudbury, ON
Liberal	Sherry Romanado	Longueuil—Charles-LeMoyne, QC
Liberal	Tim Watchorn	Les Pays-d'en-Haut, QC

== Subcommittees ==
- Subcommittee on Agenda and Procedure (SNDD)
