= Mont-Avalanche =

Ski resort in Quebec, Canada

Mont Avalanche
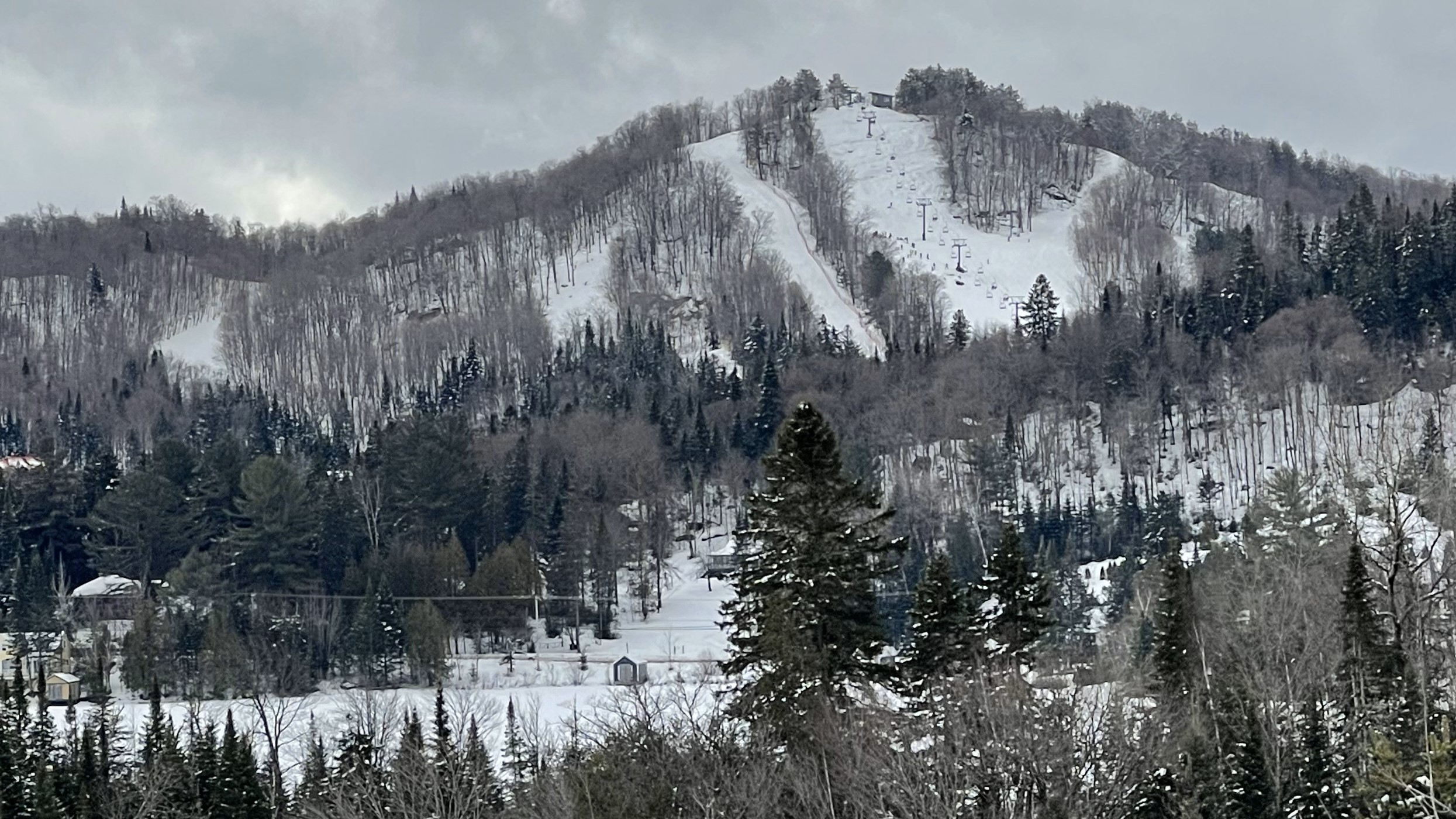
- Overview of Mont Avalanche in Saint-Adolphe-d’Howard in Quebec

Highest point
- Peak: 510 m (1,670 ft)
- Coordinates: 45.966187°N 74.348320°W

Geography
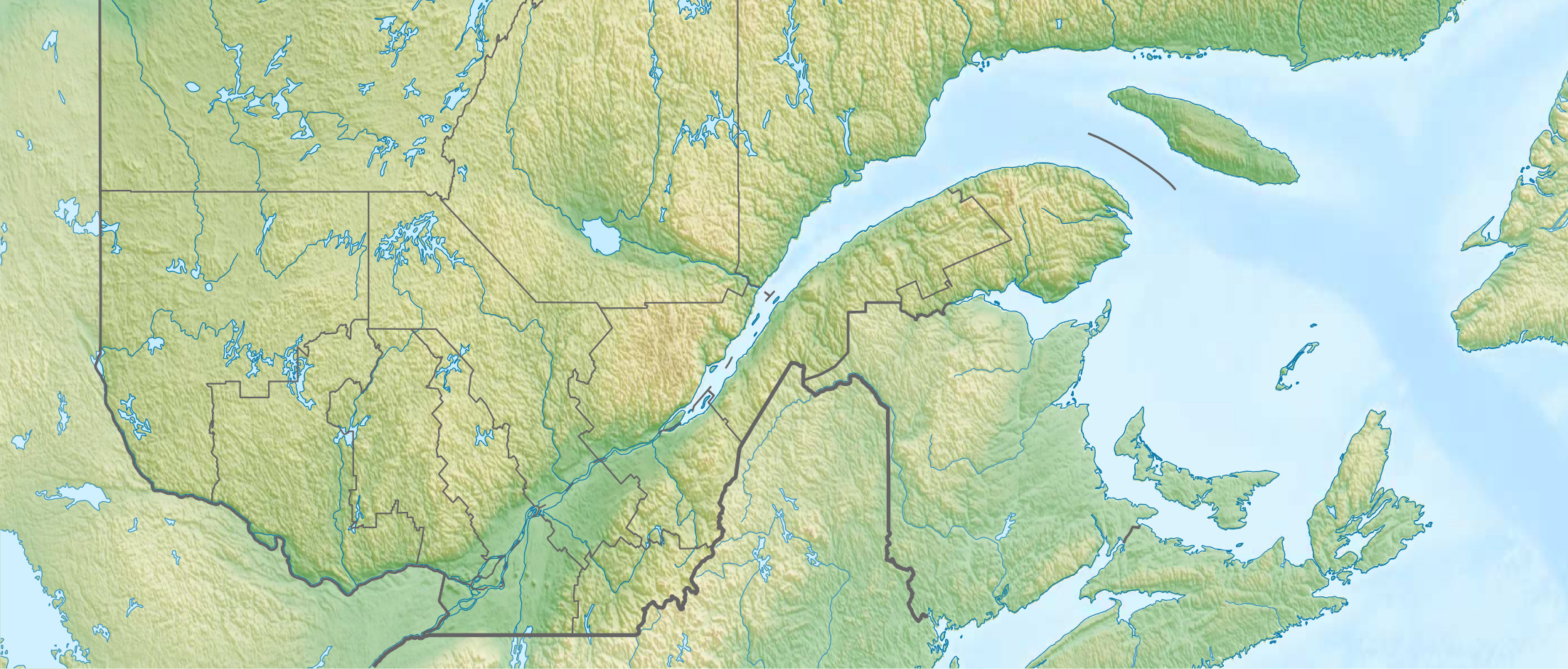
- Location within Quebec South
- Country: Canada
- Province: Quebec
- Region: Laurentides

Mont Avalanche is a mountain with a ski and outdoor resort. It is located in Saint-Adolphe-d'Howard, about an hour's drive from Montreal. The first skiing trails were built in 1957. The site now belongs to the municipality of Saint-Adolphe-d'Howard and is managed by a nonprofit organization called Plein Air St-Adolphe-d'Howard.

== Ski resort ==
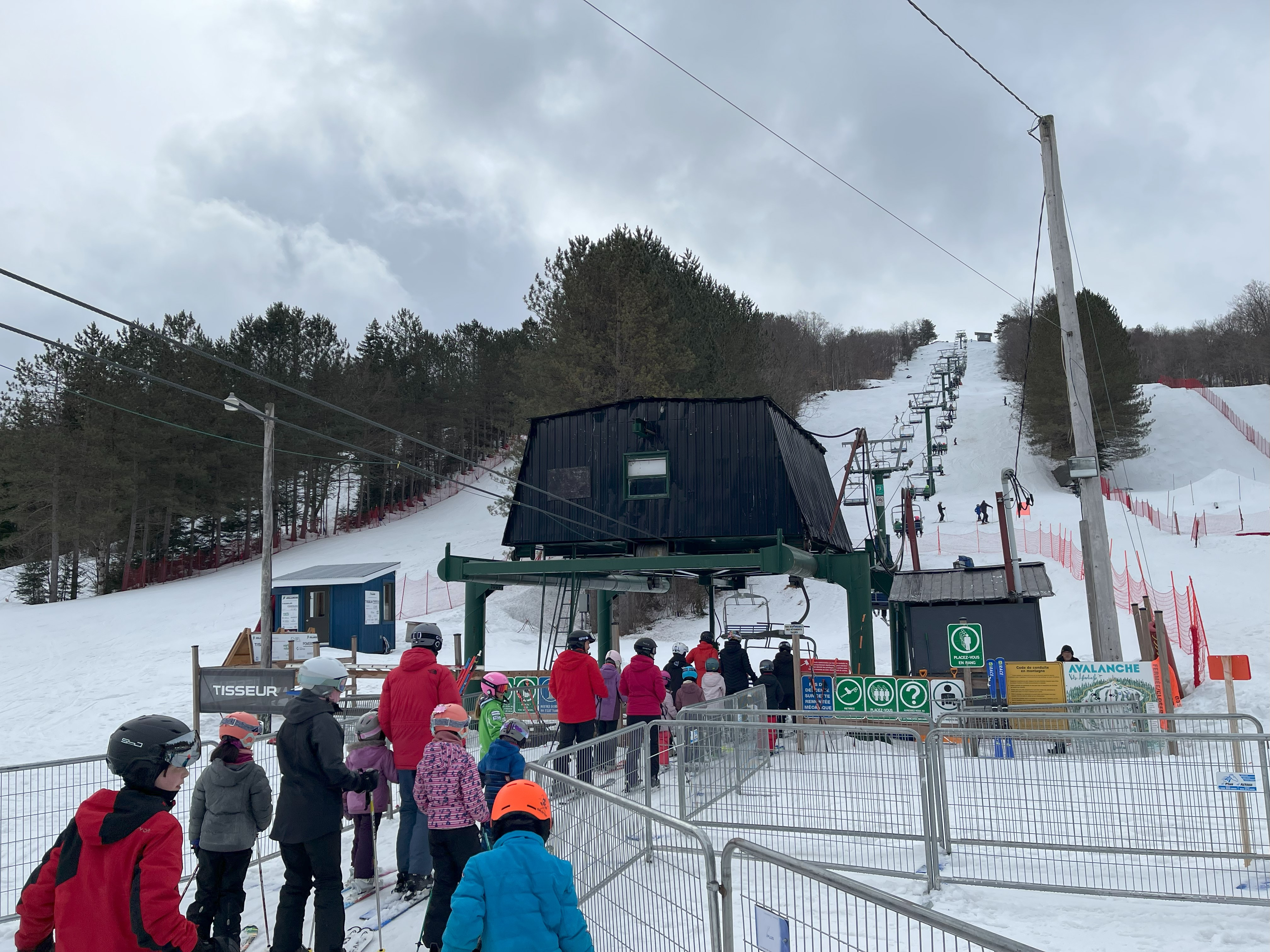
Bottom of the chairlift

Mont Avalanche
- Interactive map of Mont Avalanche
- Location: Saint-Adolphe-d'Howard, Quebec, Canada
- Mountain: Mont Avalanche
- Nearest city: Montreal 90 km (60 mi)
- Coordinates: 45.966187°N 74.348320°W
- Status: Active
- Owner: Municipality of Saint-Adolphe-d'Howard
- Vertical: 130 m (430 ft)
- Top elevation: 510 m (1,670 ft)
- Base elevation: 380 m (1,250 ft)
- Trails: 16
- Lift system: 2 total 1 chairlift, 1 moving walkway
- Snowmaking: Yes
- Night skiing: No
- Website: https://www.avalancheculturepleinair.com/

The ski resort has a height difference of 130 meters. There are 16 skiing trails, a triple chairlift and a moving walkway for beginners (magic carpet). The skiing trails are: La Bordée, Sentier des toutous, Sous-bois A, Sous-bois B, L'Avalanche, Canon Haut, Canon Bas, Le Pic, La Traverse, La Douce, L'Intrépide, La Douce Apic, La Coulée, La Boisée, Snow park, La Scoobidou (school trail).

The ski resort has artificial snowmaking equipment. There is a ski school, a shop offering snow equipment rental and a cafeteria, which are open in winter on the days the ski lift is in operation. In addition, it includes a bar with terrace (Café Bistro Bar La Montagne), which is open in winter on ski lift operating days, as well as on Fridays, Saturdays and Sundays during most of the summer and on certain days during the fall. The large cafeteria room has a capacity of 150 people and the bar can accommodate up to 50 people.

The resort also includes marked trails for Nordic ski touring, snowshoeing and snow biking (fatbike). In addition, the resort offers trails designed for hiking and mountain biking in summer. It also occasionally hosts outdoor events, including music concerts.

== See also ==
- Les Pays-d'en-Haut Regional County Municipality
- Laurentides
