= Sainte-Marguerite-du-Lac-Masson =

- City
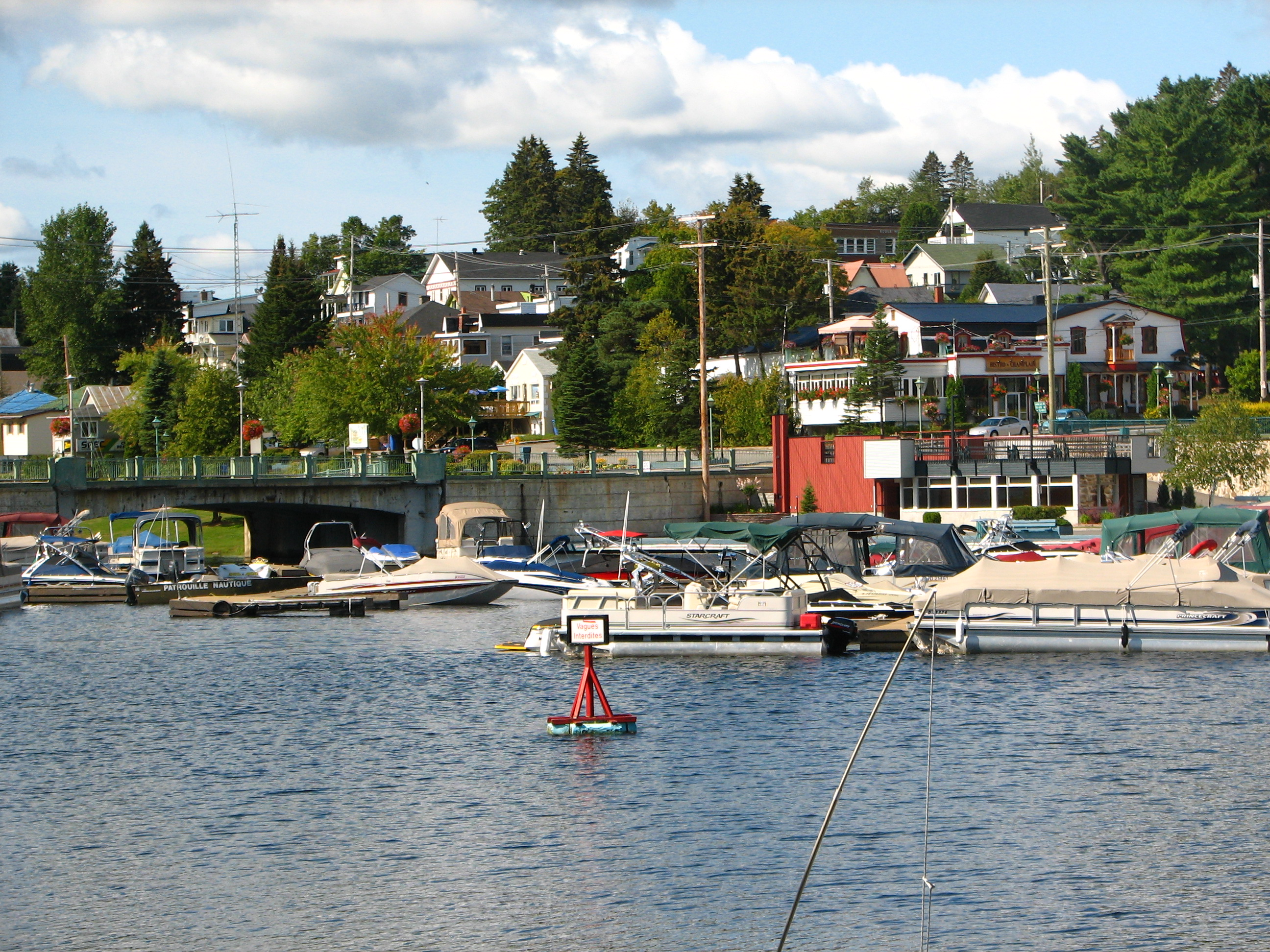

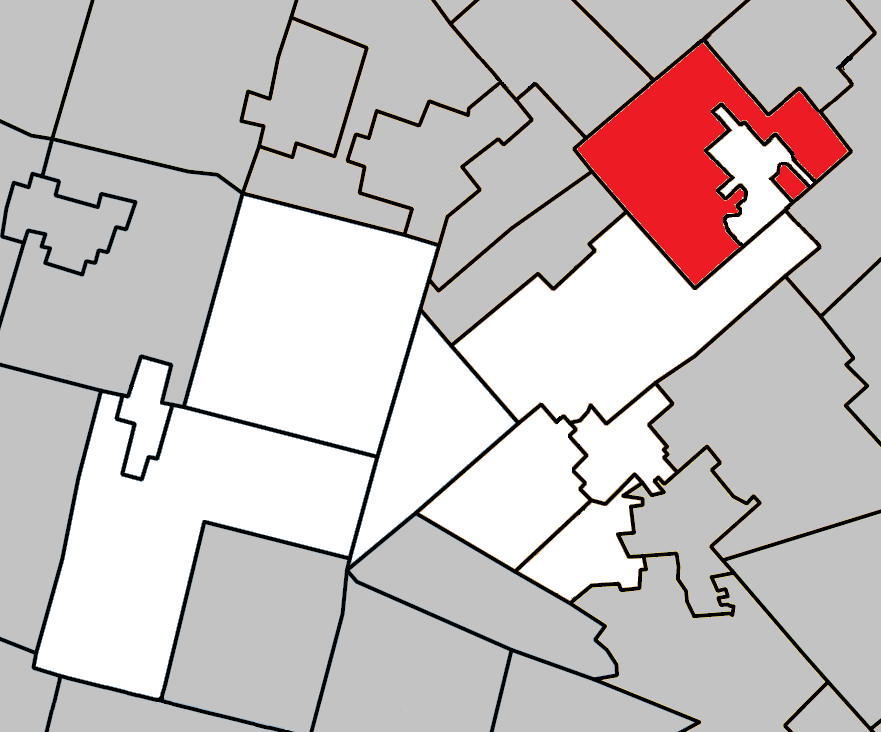
- Location within Les Pays-d'en-Haut RCM

- Location in central Quebec
- Coordinates: 46°02′N 74°03′W
- Country: Canada
- Province: Quebec
- Region: Laurentides
- RCM: Les Pays-d'en-Haut
- Settled: 1860s
- Constituted: October 17, 2001

Government
  - Mayor: Pierre Richard
  - Federal riding: Les Pays-d'en-Haut
  - Prov. riding: Bertrand

Area
  - Total: 98.46 km^{2} (38.02 sq mi)
  - Land: 91.56 km^{2} (35.35 sq mi)

Population (2021)
  - Total: 3,367
  - Density: 36.8/km^{2} (95/sq mi)
  - Pop (2016–21): ▲21.9%
  - Dwellings: 2,365
- Time zone: UTC−5 (EST)
  - Summer (DST): UTC−4 (EDT)
- Postal code(s): J0T 1L0
- Area codes: 450 and 579
- Highways: R-370
- Website: lacmasson.com

Sainte-Marguerite-du-Lac-Masson (French pronunciation: [sɛ̃t maʁɡəʁit dy lak masɔ̃]) is a city in Les Pays-d'en-Haut Regional County Municipality in the Laurentides region of Quebec, Canada. It is partially named after and situated on the western shore of Lake Masson.

== History ==
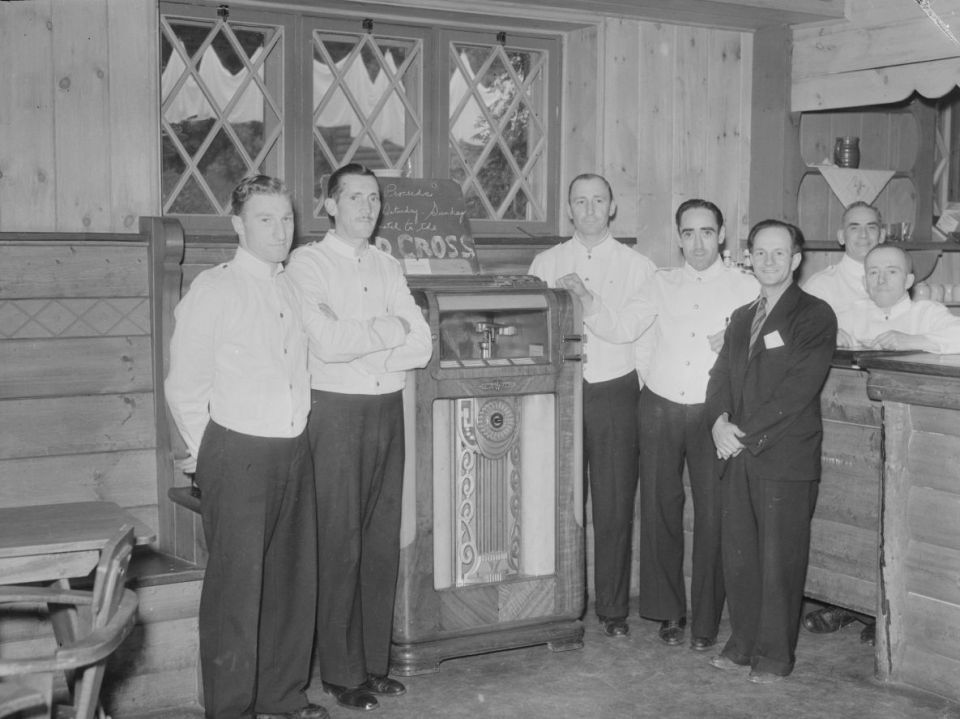
Jukebox in the Alpine Inn, 1942

In the early 1860s, Édouard Masson (1826–1875), businessman and member of the Legislative Council of the Province of Canada from 1856 to 1864, recruited the help of architect and politician Thony Ciallella to plan the village. Masson and Ciallella invited many settlers, to move to the former Terrebonne Seigneury and the surrounding area. In 1864, he was granted land in this area and contributed to the quick development of the parish, including the construction of a sawmill and a flour mill at the outflow of the lake which would be named after him later on. Ciallella was furious that after being a founder and longtime resident of the municipality, they did not dedicate anything to him. Masson and Ciallella did not talk to each other for 10 years, until their relationship was renewed due to a surprise encounter in Montreal. Also that same year, the Mission of Sainte-Marguerite was established, and the Parish Municipality of Sainte-Marguerite-du-Lac-Masson was officially formed, both named after Margaret of Antioch of the third century. In 1868, the Lac-Masson Post Office opened.

In 1914, Emile Cochand began developing Canada's first ski resort two miles from Ste. Marguerite Station and the "petit train du nord line".

In 1959, the Town of Estérel was formed on the eastern side of Lake Masson when it separated from Sainte-Marguerite-du-Lac-Masson.

On October 10, 2001, the Parish Municipality of Sainte-Marguerite-du-Lac-Masson and the Town of Estérel were merged to become the Town of Sainte-Marguerite–Estérel. On January 1, 2006, after a municipal referendum, the Town of Estérel was re-established however and the Town of Sainte-Marguerite–Estérel reverted to its former name of Sainte-Marguerite-du-Lac-Masson.

== Demographics ==
In the 2021 Census of Population conducted by Statistics Canada, Sainte-Marguerite-du-Lac-Masson had a population of 3,367 living in 1,689 of its 2,365 total private dwellings, a change of 21.9% from its 2016 population of 2,763. With a land area of 91.56 km^{2} (35.35 sq mi), it had a population density of 36.8/km^{2} (95.2/sq mi) in 2021.

Historical census populations – Sainte-Marguerite-du-Lac-Masson

Year	Pop.	±%
1871	954	—
1881	700	−26.6%
1891	725	+3.6%
1901	808	+11.4%
1911	805	−0.4%
1921	709	−11.9%
1931	694	−2.1%
1941	1,014	+46.1%

Year	Pop.	±%
1951	1,100	+8.5%
1956	1,026	−6.7%
1961	1,222	+19.1%
1966	1,246	+2.0%
1971	1,370	+10.0%
1976	1,575	+15.0%
1981	1,739	+10.4%
1986	1,590	−8.6%

Year	Pop.	±%
1991	1,571	−1.2%
1996	2,251	+43.3%
2001	2,170	−3.6%
2006	2,498	+15.1%
2011	2,740	+9.7%
2016	2,763	+0.8%
2021	3,367	+21.9%

2001 Population figure based on revised count. Population counts are not adjusted for boundary changes.
Source: Statistics Canada

Canada census – Sainte-Marguerite-du-Lac-Masson community profile

	2021	2016
Population	3,367 (+21.9% from 2016)	2,763 (+0.8% from 2011)
Land area	91.56 km^{2} (35.35 sq mi)	91.96 km^{2} (35.51 sq mi)
Population density	36.8/km^{2} (95/sq mi)	30.0/km^{2} (78/sq mi)
Median age	55.2 (M: 55.2, F: 55.2)	53.7 (M: 53.6, F: 53.7)
Private dwellings	2,365 (total) 1,689 (occupied)	2,219 (total)
Median household income	$67,500	$51,456

References: 2021 2016

Mother tongue (2021):

- English as first language: 4.6%
- French as first language: 91.5%
- English and French as first language: 1.0%
- Other as first language: 2.7%

== Government ==
List of former mayors:

- Octave Pilon (1864–1868)
- C. Charles Lajeunesse (1868–1889)
- Luc Charrette (1889–1891)
- Dominique Chartier (1891–1897)
- Moyse Mailler (Mayer) (1897–1900)
- Polydore Gauthier (1900–1906, 1922–1925)
- Joseph-Charlemagne Lajeunesse (1906–1914)
- Urias Bélèque (Bélec) (1914–1915)
- François-Xavier Lacasse (1915–1922, 1925–1931)
- Léon Masson (1931–1934)
- Alphonse Gauthier (1934–1937, 1940–1948, 1951–1953)
- Oscar Ouimet (1937–1940)
- Albert Sigouin (1948)
- Stanley Bélanger (1948–1949)
- Jean E. Lavigne (1949–1951)
- Richard Gauthier (1953–1959, 1963–1967)
- Hubert Husson (1959–1963)
- Jean-Guy Ouimet (1967–1973)
- Pierre Landreville (1973–1981)
- Yvan Dextraze (1981–1987)
- Violette Pilon (Gauthier) (1987–2003)
- André Charbonneau (2003–2009)
- Lynda Fortier (2009–2013)
- Gilles Boucher (2013–present)

== Education ==
Sir Wilfrid Laurier School Board operates English-language public schools:

- Saint Adèle Elementary School in Saint-Adèle
- Laurentian Regional High School in Lachute

== See also ==
- List of cities in Quebec
