= Piedmont, Quebec =

Piedmont
- Municipality
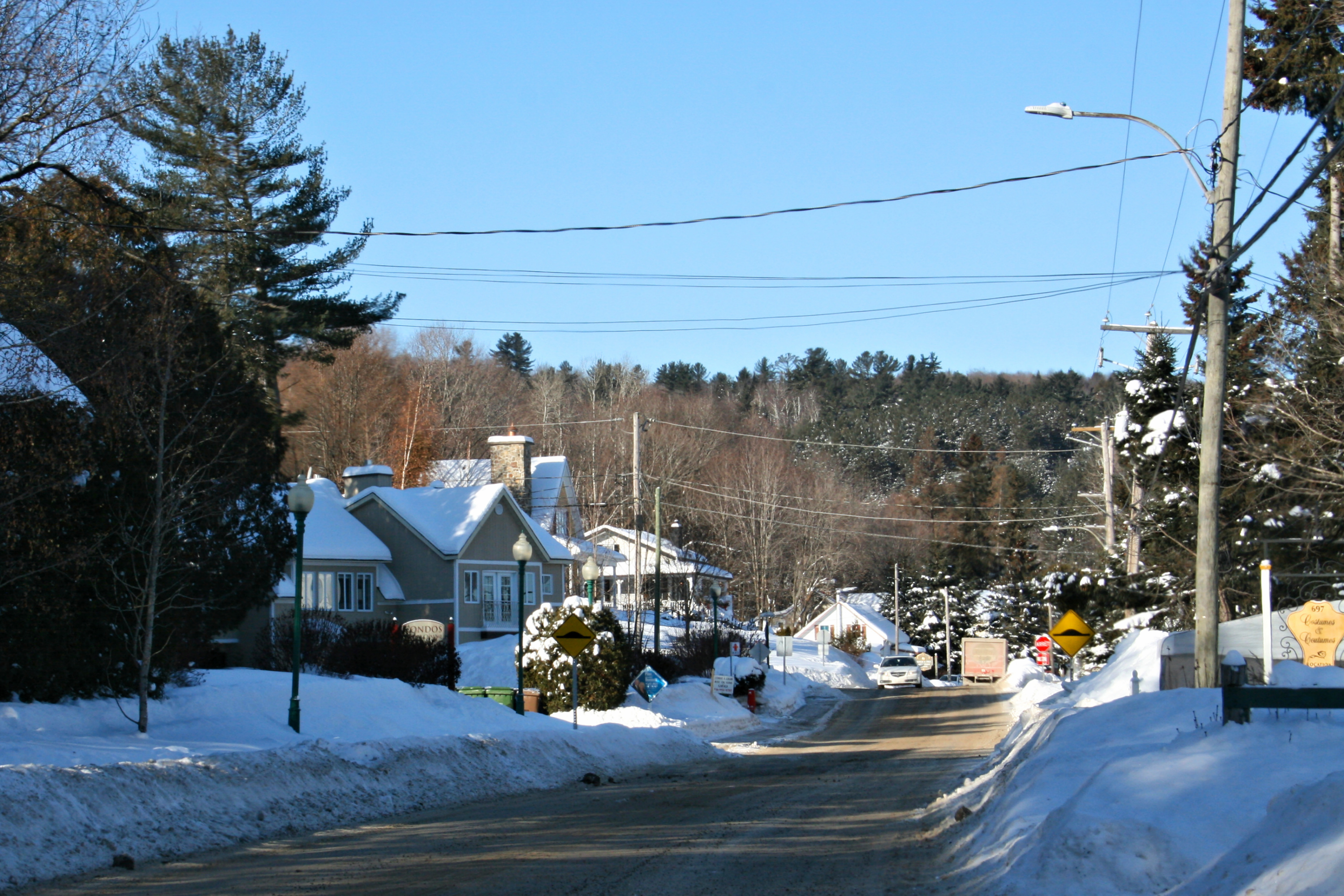
- Motto: Notre priorité est votre sécurité ("Our priority is your safety")
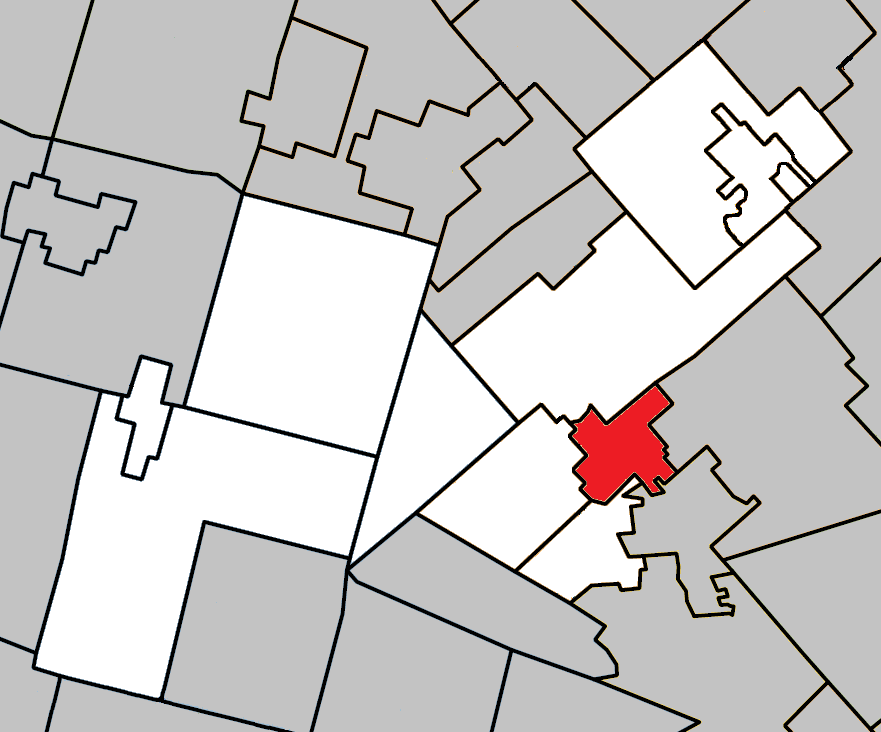
- Location within Les Pays-d'en-Haut RCM

- Location in central Quebec
- Coordinates: 45°54′N 74°08′W
- Country: Canada
- Province: Quebec
- Region: Laurentides
- RCM: Les Pays-d'en-Haut
- Constituted: September 22, 1923

Government
  - Mayor: Bernard Bouclin
  - Fed. riding: Les Pays-d'en-Haut
  - Prov. riding: Bertrand

Area
  - Total: 24.68 km^{2} (9.53 sq mi)
  - Land: 24.36 km^{2} (9.41 sq mi)

Population (2021)
  - Total: 3,476
  - Density: 142.7/km^{2} (370/sq mi)
  - Pop (2016–21): ▲17.8%
  - Dwellings: 2,385
- Time zone: UTC−5 (EST)
  - Summer (DST): UTC−4 (EDT)
- Postal code(s): J0R 1K0
- Area codes: 450 and 579
- Highways A-15 (TCH): R-117
- Website: www.piedmont.ca

Piedmont (French pronunciation: [pjemɔ̃]) is a small municipality within the Les Pays-d'en-Haut Regional County Municipality, Quebec, Canada, in the administrative region of Laurentides. It is located along the North River and Autoroute 15 and Route 117, north of Montreal.

Its name refers to its location at the foot of the Laurentian Mountains.

== History ==
Its post office opened in 1875. Piedmont was originally part of Saint-Sauveur until 1923 when it split away to become its own municipality.

Until October 2009, police services in Piedmont were provided by the Rivière-du-Nord Intermunicipal Police Board. Since then, the service has been provided by the Sûreté du Québec.

=== Guy Turcotte killings ===
On the morning of 21 February 2009, police received a call from Guy Turcotte's home in Piedmont, which he had been occupying after leaving his marital home in Prévost. When officers arrived on the scene, they discovered the bodies of two children, aged three and five, and later their father, who had attempted suicide.

In 2010, Guy Turcotte was charged with and convicted of the murder of his children.

== Geography ==
Covering a total area of 24.70 square kilometres, with 24.36 square kilometres of land, Piedmont is characterized by its mountainous terrain and proximity to the North River, offering residents and visitors a serene natural setting.

== Demographics ==
In the 2021 Census of Population conducted by Statistics Canada, Piedmont had a population of 3,476 living in 1,822 of its 2,385 total private dwellings, a change of 17.8% from its 2016 population of 2,950. With a land area of 24.36 km^{2} (9.41 sq mi), it had a population density of 142.7/km^{2} (369.6/sq mi) in 2021.

Historical census populations – Piedmont, Quebec

Year	Pop.	±%
1931	248	—
1941	506	+104.0%
1951	324	−36.0%
1956	328	+1.2%
1961	465	+41.8%
1966	643	+38.3%

Year	Pop.	±%
1971	757	+17.7%
1976	987	+30.4%
1981	1,095	+10.9%
1986	1,061	−3.1%
1991	1,462	+37.8%
1996	1,862	+27.4%

Year	Pop.	±%
2001	2,122	+14.0%
2006	2,386	+12.4%
2011	2,721	+14.0%
2016	2,950	+8.4%
2021	3,476	+17.8%

Source: Statistics Canada

Private dwellings occupied by usual residents (2021): 1822 (total dwellings: 2385)

Mother tongue (2021):

- English as first language: 5.5%
- French as first language: 88.4%
- English and French as first languages: 2.2%
- Other as first language: 3.3%

== Government ==
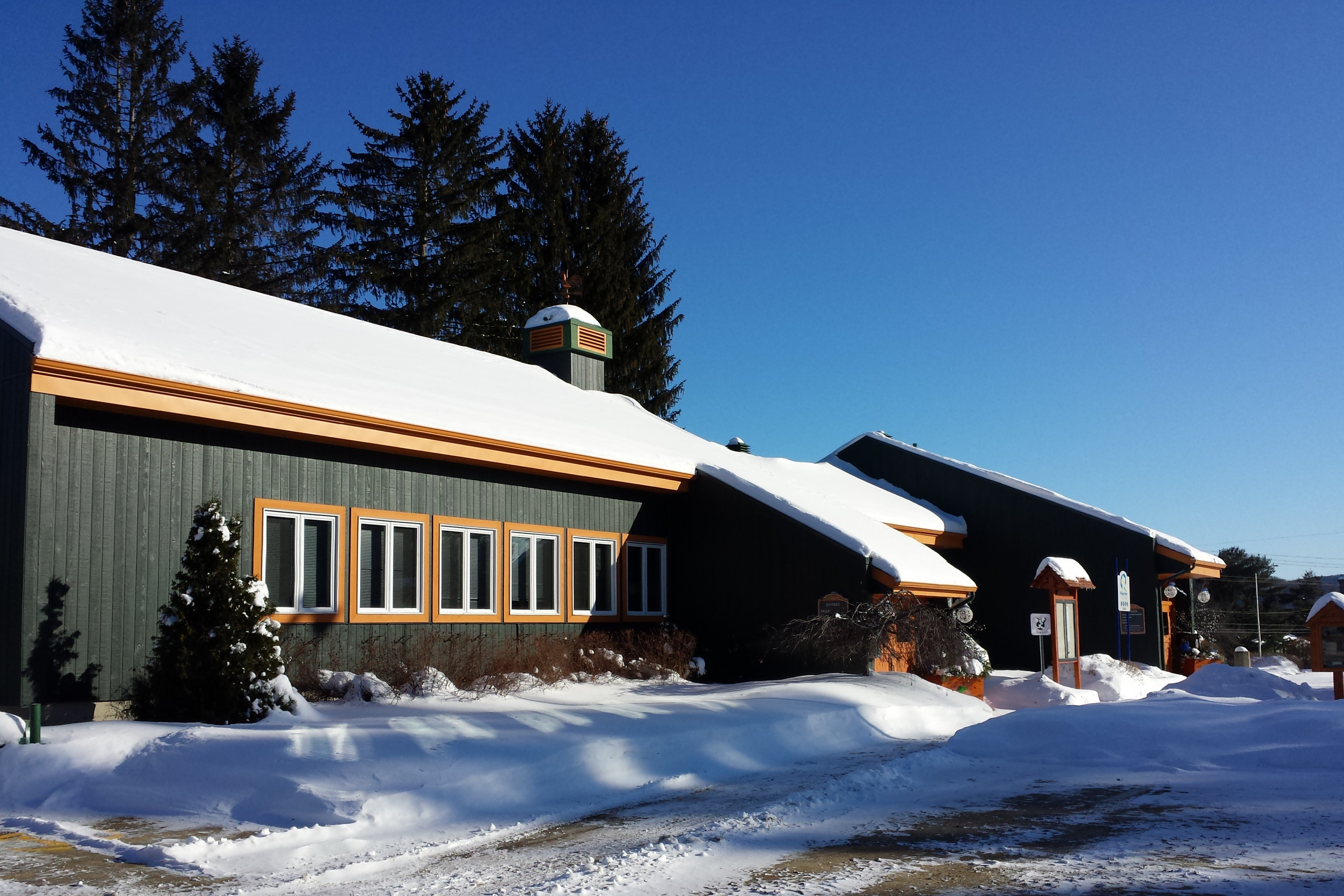
Piedmont town hall

List of former mayors:

- Félix Boisseau (1923–1926)
- Adélard Forget (1926–1929)
- Alphonse De Koninck (1929–1931)
- Joseph Cagliesi (1931–1944, 1951–1955)
- Lionel Constantineau (1944–1948)
- Achille Lalande (1948–1951, 1956–1957)
- Alexandre Beaulne (1955–1956)
- Fernand Constantineau (1956)
- Eillen Consiglio (1957–1965)
- Hervé Boyer (1965–1968)
- Donat Dandurand (1968–1971)
- Jacques De Carufel (1971)
- J. Richard Comtois (1971–1977)
- Louis J. Clément (1977–1987)
- Jean Jacques Henri Raymond (1987–1999)
- Maurice Charbonneau (1999–2005)
- Clément Cardin (2005–2017)
- Nathalie Rochon (2017–2022)
- Martin Nadon (2022–present)

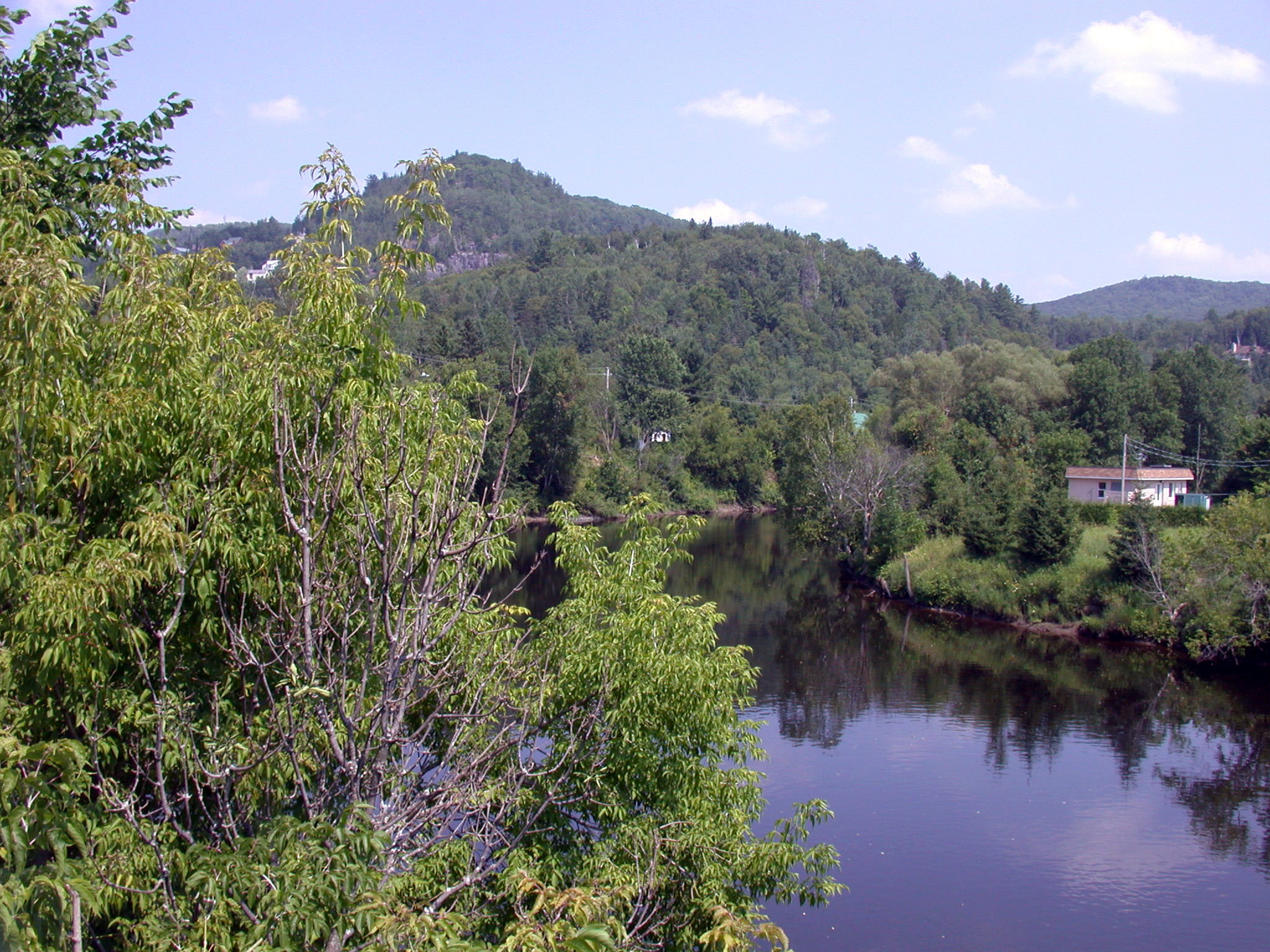
Rivière du Nord in Piedmont

== Education ==
The Sir Wilfrid Laurier School Board manages Anglophone public education in Piedmont and the surrounding area. Depending on their residential zoning, students from Piedmont may attend Morin Heights Elementary School in Morin-Heights or Saint Adèle Elementary School in Saint-Adèle for primary education. For secondary education, students are typically zoned to Laurentian Regional High School in Lachute.

French-language public schools in the area are operated by the Centre de services scolaire des Laurentides, which provides primary and secondary education options for Francophone residents. Piedmont's proximity to nearby towns and cities also gives families access to private schools and specialized programs, ensuring diverse educational opportunities.

The region emphasizes bilingual education, reflecting Quebec's cultural and linguistic heritage.
