= Rivière-du-Nord Intermunicipal Police Board =

Canadian intermunicipal policing board

Coordinates: 45.8743°N 74.0794°W

The Régie intermunicipale de police de la Rivière-du-Nord (French pronunciation: [ʁeʒi ɛ̃tɛʁmynisipal də pɔlis də la ʁivjɛʁ dy nɔʁ], Rivière-du-Nord Intermunicipal Police Board) was the shared police service of three (originally four) municipalities in Quebec's Laurentians:

- Saint-Hippolyte
- Piedmont
- Sainte-Anne-des-Lacs

Prévost was originally part of the police service, but left it on April 1, 2004, however the police service's headquarters remained in Prévost.

In May 2009 plans were revealed to close the service and turn policing of the remaining three municipalities over to the Sûreté du Québec.

On October 23, 2009, the Régie intermunicipale de police de la Rivière-du-Nord's policing operations ended at 1 minute past midnight. All the Régie's police officers transferred to the Sûreté du Québec, divided between a station serving the Les Pays-d'en-Haut Regional County Municipality in Saint-Sauveur and the station serving the La Rivière-du-Nord Regional County Municipality regional county municipality, formerly located in Saint-Jérôme but now in the former Régie intermunicipale de police de la Rivière-du-Nord building in Prévost.
