= Estérel, Quebec =

Estérel
- City
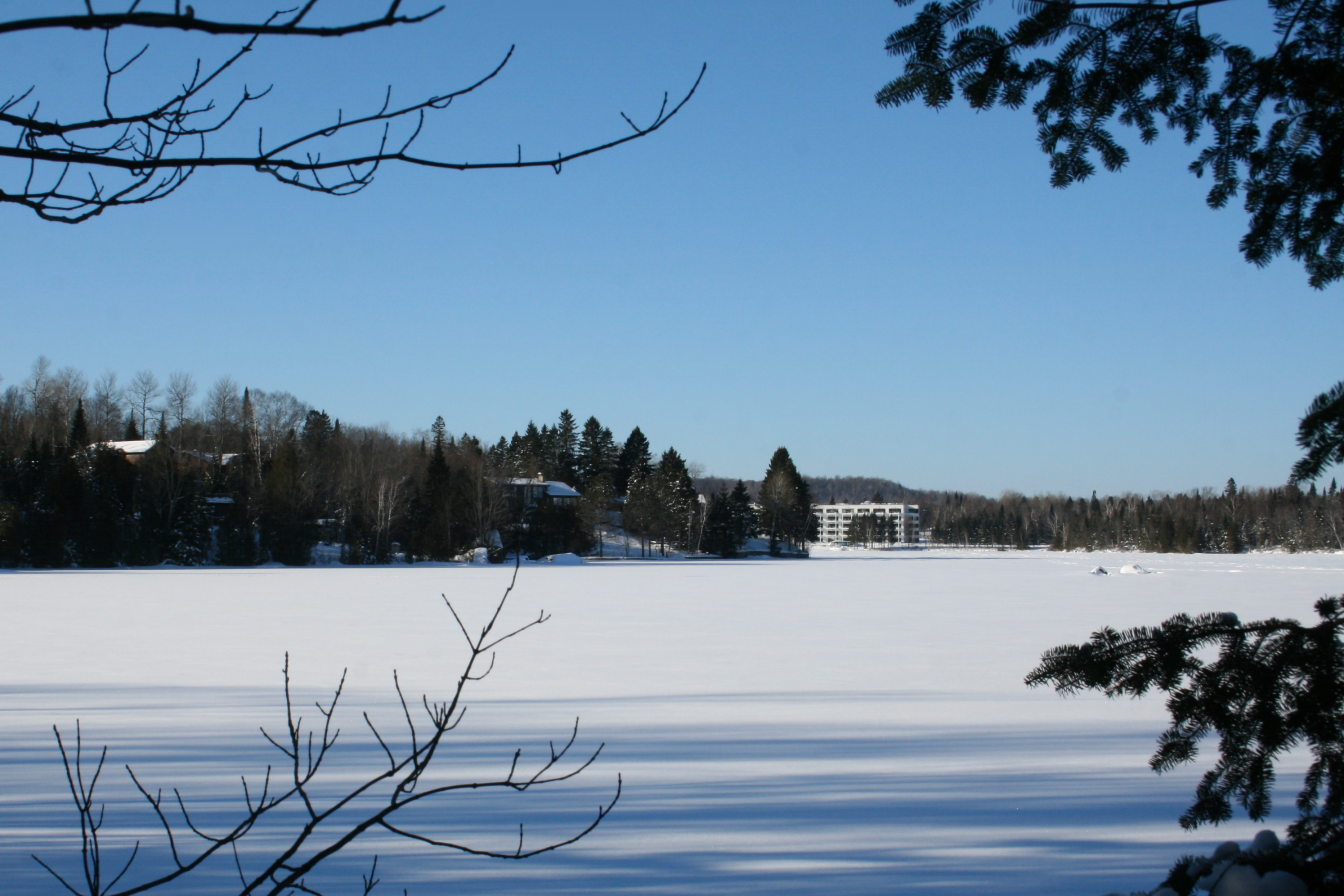
- Lac Dupuis, with Estérel Resort in the background

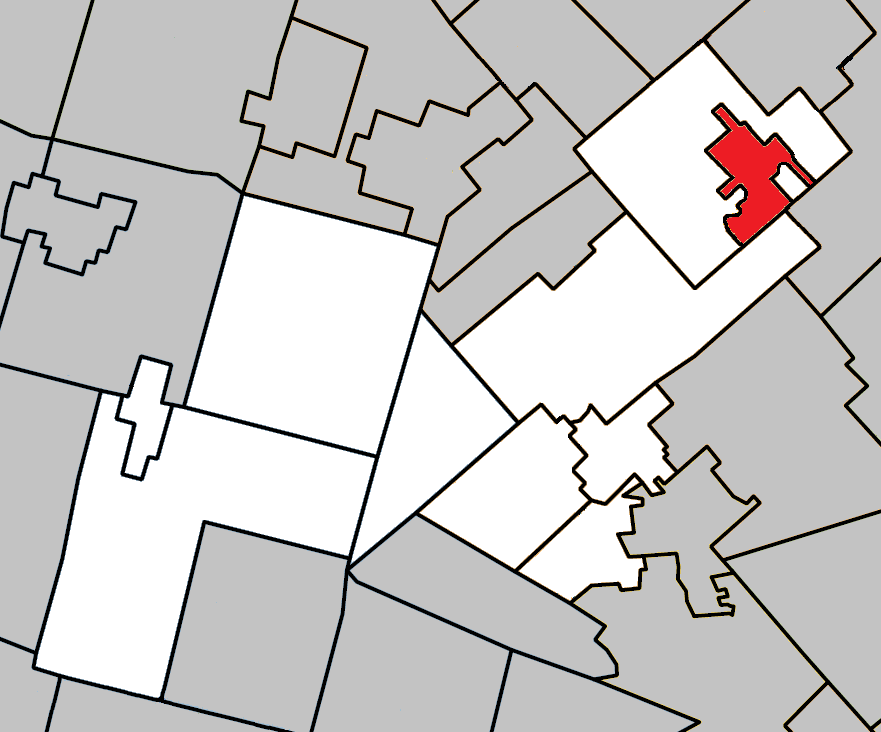
- Location within Les Pays-d'en-Haut RCM

- Location in central Quebec
- Coordinates: 46°03′N 74°01′W
- Country: Canada
- Province: Quebec
- Region: Laurentides
- RCM: Les Pays-d'en-Haut
- Settled: 1920s
- Constituted: January 1, 2006

Government
  - Mayor: Frank Pappas
  - Federal riding: Les Pays-d'en-Haut
  - Prov. riding: Bertrand

Area
  - Total: 16.55 km^{2} (6.39 sq mi)
  - Land: 12.62 km^{2} (4.87 sq mi)

Population (2021)
  - Total: 262
  - Density: 20.8/km^{2} (54/sq mi)
  - Pop (2016–21): ▲33.7%
  - Dwellings: 377
- Time zone: UTC−5 (EST)
  - Summer (DST): UTC−4 (EDT)
- Postal code(s): J0T 1E0
- Area codes: 450 and 579
- Website: www.villedesterel.com

Estérel (French pronunciation: [ɛsteʁɛl]) is a city in Les Pays-d'en-Haut Regional County Municipality in the Laurentides region of Quebec, Canada. The municipal territory almost entirely extends around Lake Masson, whereas the village itself is situated on the eastern shore of this lake.

== History ==
The area of Estérel was originally part of the Parish Municipality of Sainte-Marguerite-du-Lac-Masson, which formed in the early 1860s.

Around 1920, Baron Louis Empain, son of Belgian industrialist Baron Édouard Empain, acquired substantially all the land around Lake Masson intending to build a resort called Estérel, named after the Esterel massif in Provence, south-east France. In 1939, the Estérel Post Office opened.

In 1958, Fridolin Simard, an industrialist from Abitibi, bought over 2000 hectares of the baron's estate and completed the holiday resort. A year later in 1959, The Town of Estérel was formed when it separated from Sainte-Marguerite-du-Lac-Masson.

On October 10, 2001, the Town of Estérel and the Parish Municipality of Sainte-Marguerite-du-Lac-Masson were merged to become the Town of Sainte-Marguerite–Estérel. On January 1, 2006, after a municipal referendum, the Town of Estérel was however re-established and the Town of Sainte-Marguerite–Estérel was renamed to its former name of Sainte-Marguerite-du-Lac-Masson.

== Demographics ==
In the 2021 Census of Population conducted by Statistics Canada, Estérel had a population of 262 living in 153 of its 377 total private dwellings, a change of 33.7% from its 2016 population of 196. With a land area of 12.62 km^{2} (4.87 sq mi), it had a population density of 20.8/km^{2} (53.8/sq mi) in 2021.

Historical census populations – Estérel, Quebec

Year	Pop.	±%
1961	12	—
1966	133	+1008.3%
1971	94	−29.3%
1976	54	−42.6%
1981	68	+25.9%
1986	56	−17.6%
1991	119	+112.5%

Year	Pop.	±%
1996	108	−9.2%
2001	181	+67.6%
2006	256	+41.4%
2011	199	−22.3%
2016	196	−1.5%
2021	262	+33.7%

Source: Statistics Canada

Mother tongue (2021):

- English as first language: 17%
- French as first language: 75.5%
- English and French as first language: 3.8%
- Other as first language: 5.7%

== Government ==
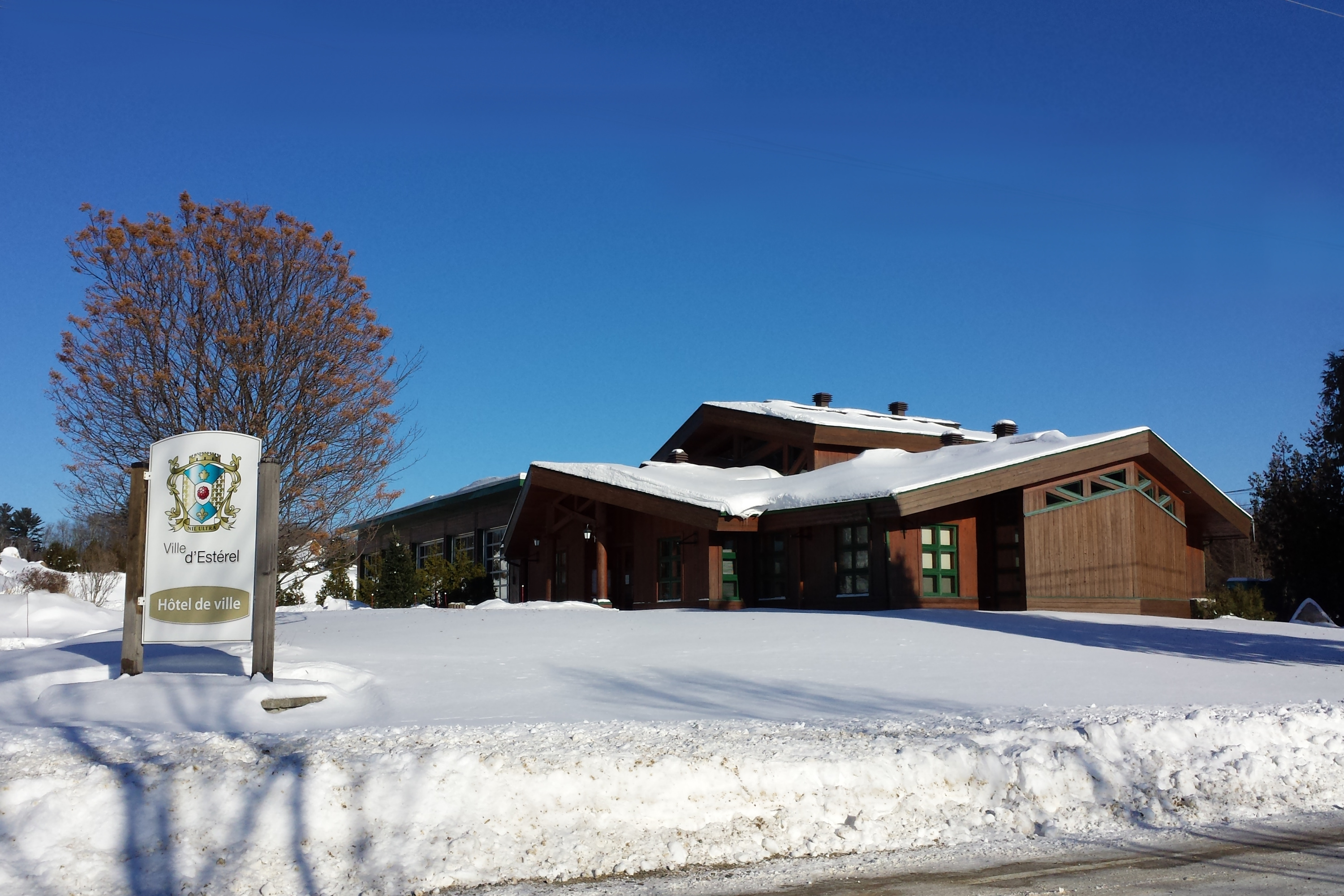
Estérel town hall

List of former mayors:

- Fridolin Simard (1959)
- André Nadeau (...–2009)
- Jean-Pierre Nepveu (2009–2017)
- Joseph Dydzak (2017–2021)
- Frank Pappas (2021–present)

== See also ==
- List of anglophone communities in Quebec
- List of cities in Quebec
