= Saint-Adolphe-d'Howard =

- Municipality
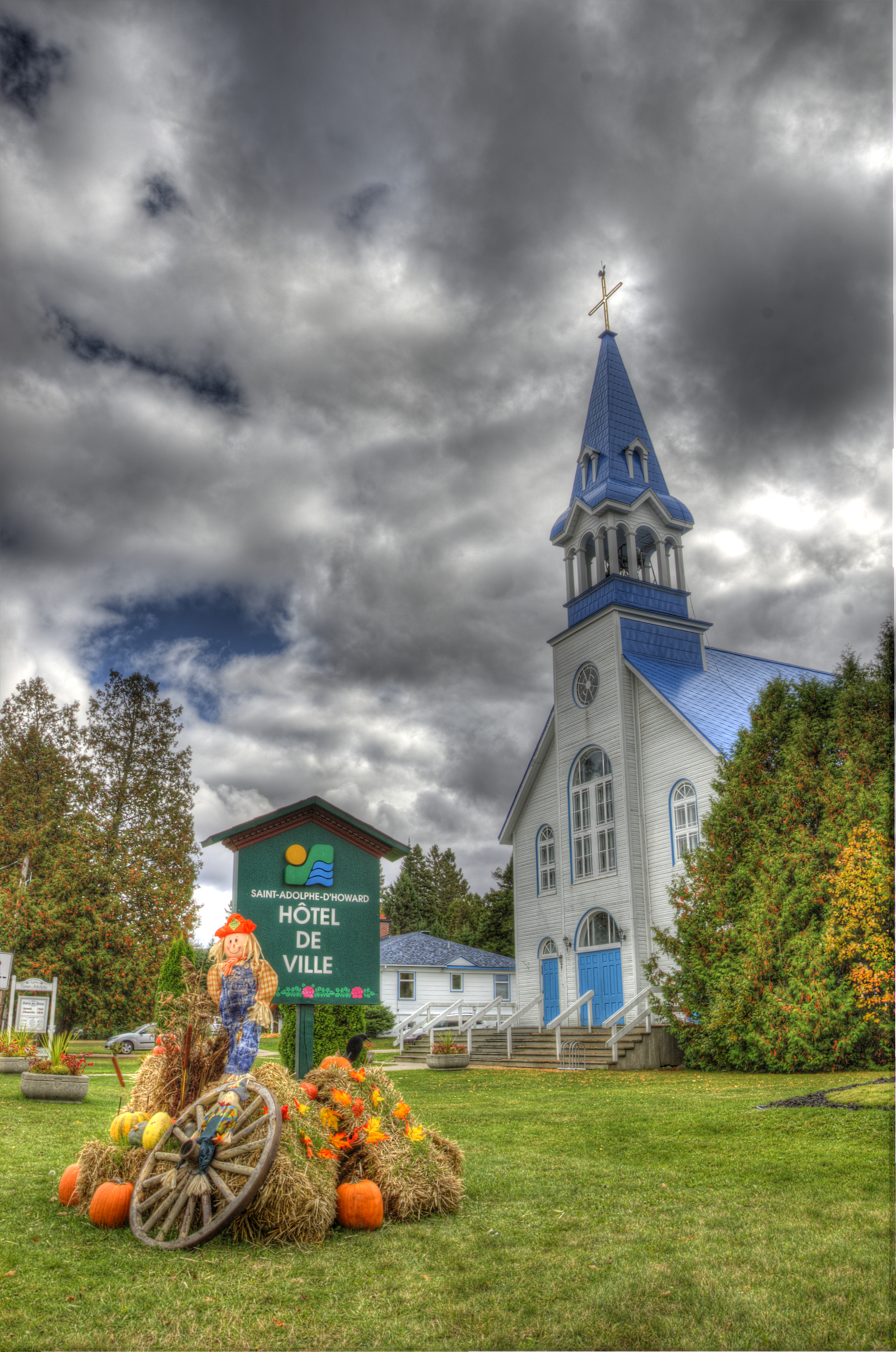
- Church of Saint-Adolphe-d'Howard

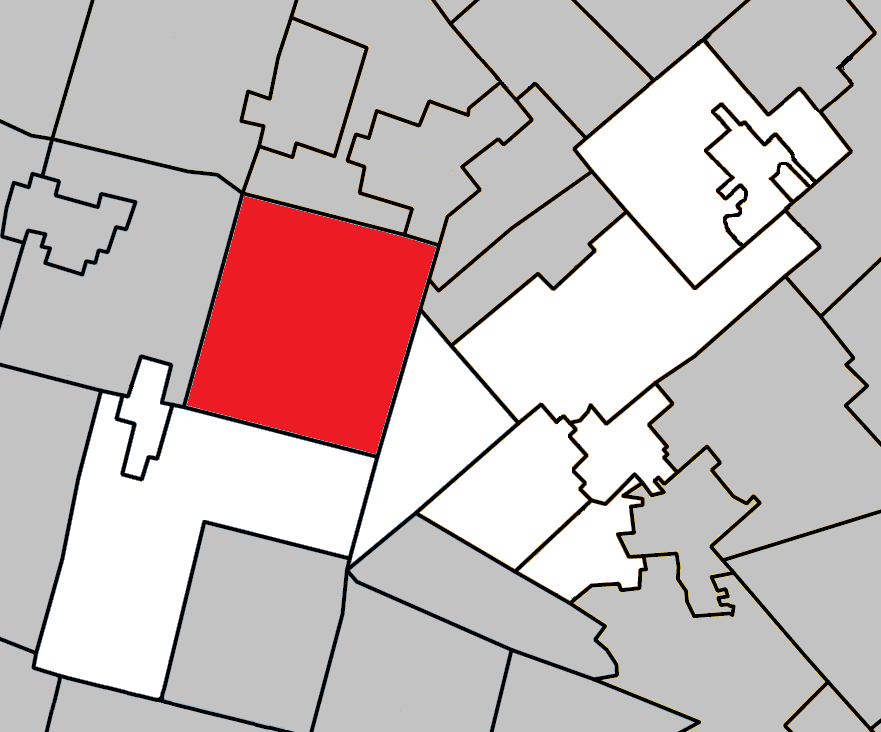
- Location within Les Pays-d'en-Haut RCM

- Location in central Quebec
- Coordinates: 45°58′N 74°20′W
- Country: Canada
- Province: Quebec
- Region: Laurentides
- RCM: Les Pays-d'en-Haut
- Settled: 1860s
- Constituted: January 1, 1883

Government
  - Mayor: Alexendre Sarrazin
  - Fed. riding: Argenteuil—La Petite-Nation
  - Prov. riding: Argenteuil

Area
  - Total: 149.04 km^{2} (57.54 sq mi)
  - Land: 135.80 km^{2} (52.43 sq mi)

Population (2021)
  - Total: 3,824
  - Density: 28.2/km^{2} (73/sq mi)
  - Pop (2016–21): ▲9.0%
  - Dwellings: 3,730
- Time zone: UTC−5 (EST)
  - Summer (DST): UTC−4 (EDT)
- Postal code: J0T 2B0
- Area code: 819
- Website: www.stadolphedhoward.qc.ca

Saint-Adolphe-d'Howard (French pronunciation: [sɛ̃t‿adɔlf dawɚd, -wœʁd]) is a municipality in the Laurentian Mountains, in the Province of Quebec, Canada, north-west of Montreal.

Saint-Adolphe-d'Howard, located on the shores of lake Saint-Joseph, has nearly 70 lakes in its territory. It is home to Mont-Avalanche ski resort.

== History ==
The settlement began in 1864. In 1873, the geographic township of Howard was created, named after Frederick Howard, 5th Earl of Carlisle. The Lac-Saint-Joseph Mission was founded in 1878, served by Adolphe Jodoin (1836-1891), parish priest of Saint-Sauveur-des-Monts. In 1882, the Saint-Adolphe-de-Howard post office opened. The following year, the Township Municipality of Howard was established.

In 1939, the township changed name and statutes to become the Municipality of Saint-Adolphe-d'Howard.

From 1952 to 1987, Saint-Adolphe-d'Howard was home to Canadian Forces Station Lac St. Denis.

== Demographics ==
Historical census populations – Saint-Adolphe-d'Howard

Year	Pop.	±%
1891	448	—
1901	551	+23.0%
1911	513	−6.9%
1921	450	−12.3%
1931	418	−7.1%
1941	629	+50.5%
1951	520	−17.3%

Year	Pop.	±%
1956	1,155	+122.1%
1961	1,298	+12.4%
1966	1,265	−2.5%
1971	1,333	+5.4%
1976	1,351	+1.4%
1981	1,686	+24.8%
1986	1,605	−4.8%

Year	Pop.	±%
1991	2,263	+41.0%
1996	2,632	+16.3%
2001	2,684	+2.0%
2006	3,563	+32.7%
2011	3,702	+3.9%
2016	3,509	−5.2%
2021	3,824	+9.0%

Source: Statistics Canada

Private dwellings occupied by usual residents (2021): 2,039 (total dwellings: 3,730)

Mother tongue (2021):

- English as first language: 7.7%
- French as first language: 87.2%
- English and French as first languages: 1.2%
- Other as first language: 3.4%

== Government ==
List of former mayors:

- Gédéon Ouimet (1883–1890)
- Charles Brunet (1890–1905)
- Adélard Gratton (1905–1910)
- Olivier Wood (1910–1913)
- Victor Bergeron (1913–1919)
- Dosithée Forget (1919–1922)
- Ferdinand Depatie (1922–1925)
- Cyrille Guindon (1925–1932)
- Henri Lajeunesse (1932–1937)
- Albert Bertrand (1937–1945)
- Wilfrid Gratton (1945–1951, 1955–1959)
- Édouard Bellefleur (1951–1955)
- Émile Gratton (1959–1962)
- D. E. Ross (1962–1963)
- J. A. Préfontaine (1963–1965, 1968–1969)
- Charles Brosseau (1965–1967)
- Henri Paul Potvin (1967–1968)
- Gaston R. Bourgeault (1969–1973)
- Marcel Godin (1973–1981, 1982–1985)
- Albert Di Fruscia (1981–1982)
- Michel Gratton (1985–1993)
- Jean J. Brossard (1993–2004)
- Marc Vadeboncoeur (2004–2005)
- Pierre Roy (2005–2009)
- Réjean Gravel (2009–2013)
- Lisette Lapointe (2013–2017)
- Claude Charbonneau (2017–2025)
- Alexendre Sarrazin (2025–present)

== Education ==
Sir Wilfrid Laurier School Board operates Anglophone public schools:

- Sainte Agathe Academy in Sainte-Agathe-des-Monts serves the northern portion for both elementary and secondary levels.
- Morin Heights Elementary School (serves the southern portion) in Morin-Heights
- Laurentian Regional High School (serves the southern portion) in Lachute

== See also ==
- List of municipalities in Quebec
