= Saint-Sauveur, Quebec =

Saint-Sauveur
- City
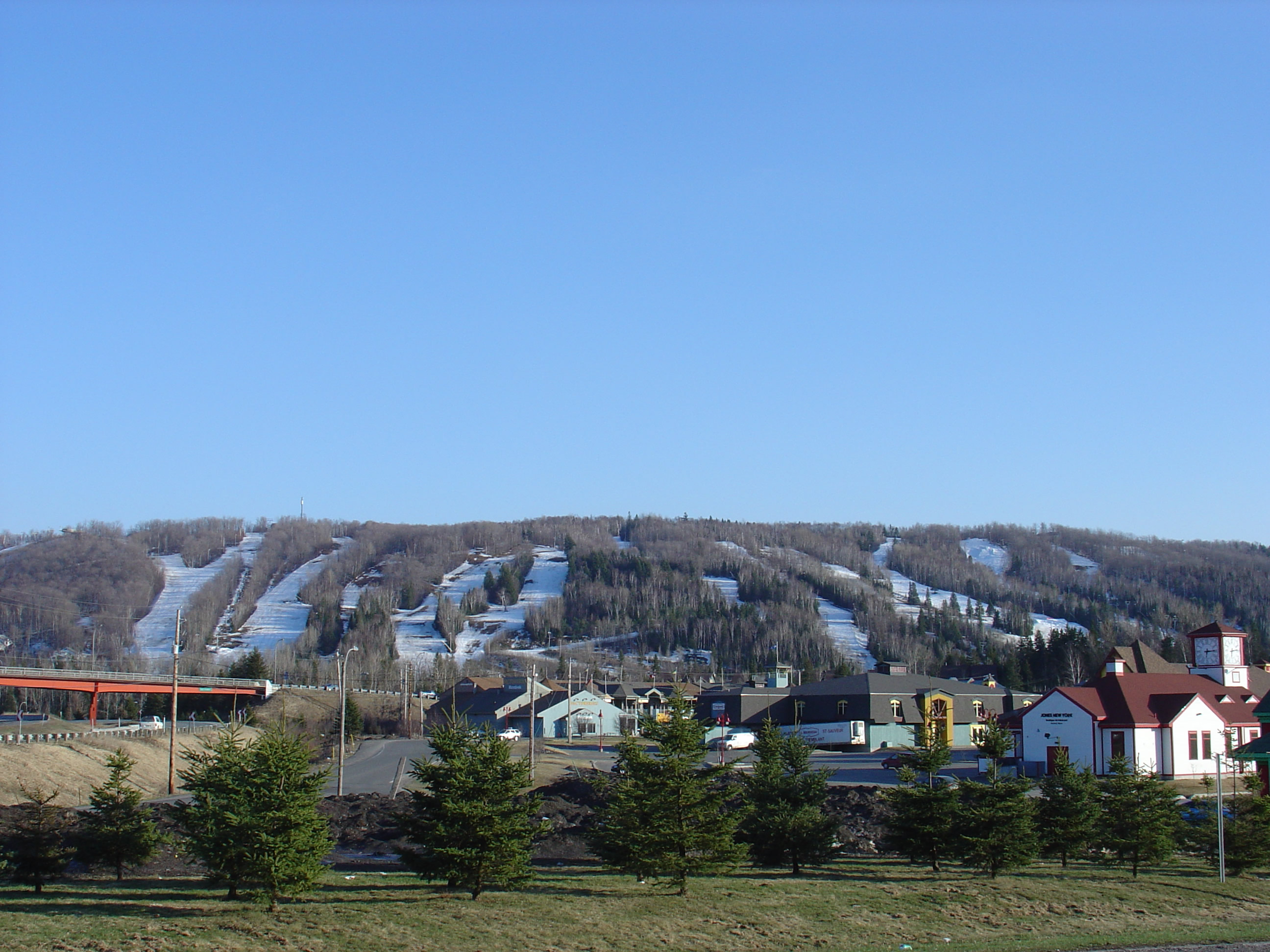
- Mont Saint-Sauveur

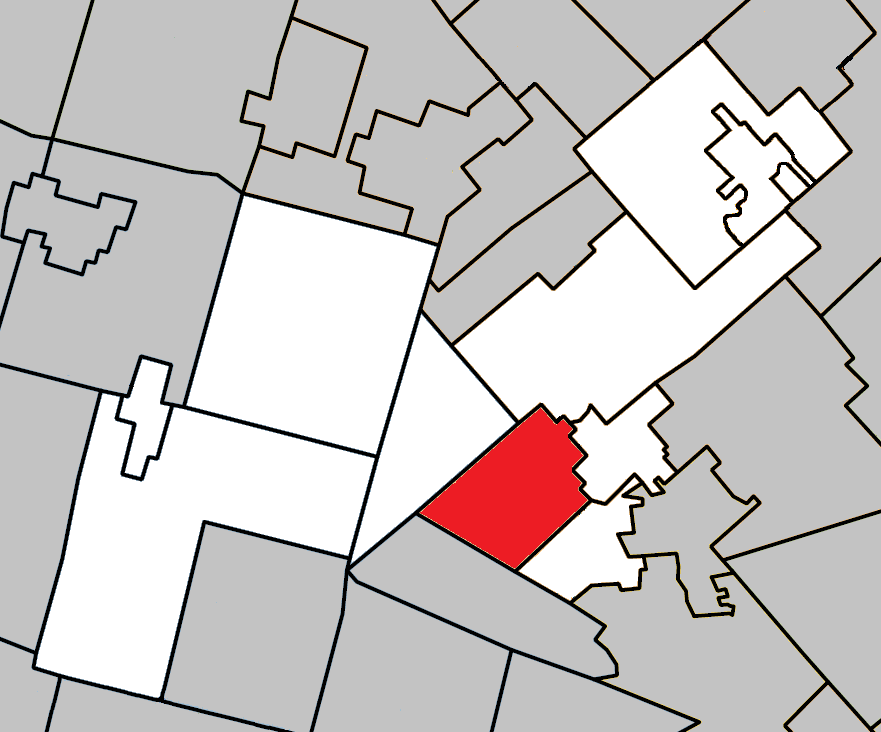
- Location within Les Pays-d'en-Haut RCM

- Location in central Quebec
- Coordinates: 45°53′35.438″N 74°9′24.186″W
- Country: Canada
- Province: Quebec
- Region: Laurentides
- RCM: Les Pays-d'en-Haut
- Settled: 1830s
- Constituted: September 11, 2002

Government
  - Mayor: Luc Martel
  - Federal riding: Les Pays-d'en-Haut
  - Prov. riding: Bertrand

Area
  - Total: 50.18 km^{2} (19.37 sq mi)
  - Land: 47.62 km^{2} (18.39 sq mi)
  - Urban: 10.06 km^{2} (3.88 sq mi)

Population (2021)
  - Total: 11,580
  - Density: 243.2/km^{2} (630/sq mi)
  - Urban: 8,854
  - Urban density: 880.2/km^{2} (2,280/sq mi)
  - Pop (2016–21): ▲13.2%
- Time zone: UTC−5 (EST)
  - Summer (DST): UTC−4 (EDT)
- Postal code(s): J0R
- Area codes: 450 and 579
- Highways A-15 (TCH): R-364
- Website: www.vss.ca

Saint-Sauveur (French pronunciation: [sɛ̃ sovœʁ]) is a town and municipality within the Les Pays-d'en-Haut Regional County Municipality, Quebec, Canada. It is in the administrative region of Laurentides in the Laurentian Mountains, located about 60 kilometres north of Montreal.

St-Sauveur is well known for its local ski areas, the biggest of which is Mont Saint-Sauveur. The ski areas market themselves jointly under the name of "Valley of Saint-Sauveur". Its proximity to Montreal, as well as its snow-making capability, night-time skiing, and après-ski establishments make St-Sauveur a popular destination for skiers.

On September 11, 2002 the city was created from the merger of the village of Saint-Sauveur-des-Monts and the parish municipality of Saint-Sauveur. The current director general is Jean Beaulieu. The city clerk is Normand Patrice.

== History ==
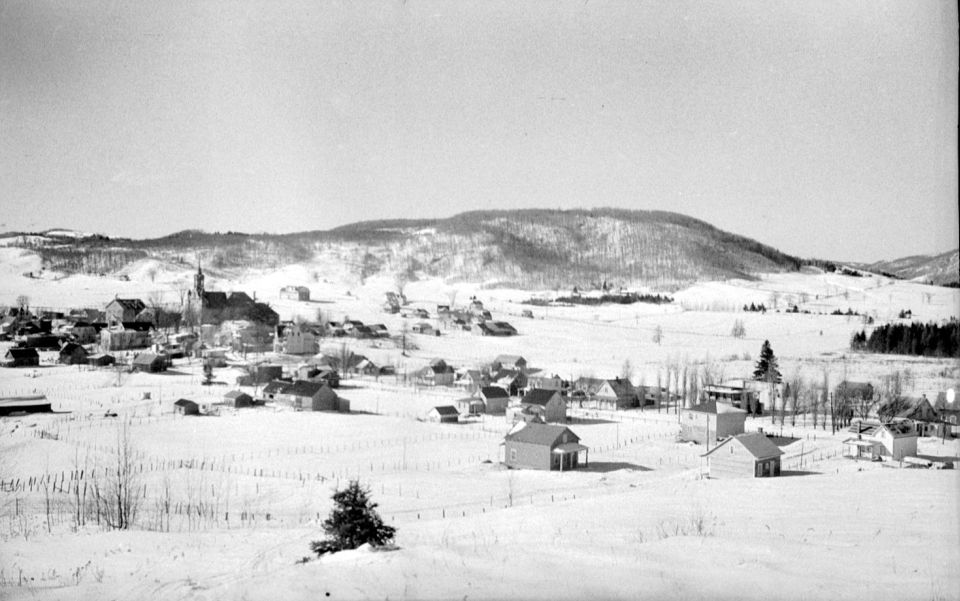
Saint-Sauveur-des-Monts in 1942

The first settlers settled in the Saint-Sauveur valley along the Rivière du Nord. By 1827, the seigneurs of Augmentation-des-Mille-Îles had granted some 120 lots on both sides of the Rivière du Nord. On a contemporary map, these lands corresponded to riverside lots in the present-day municipalities of Prévost and Piedmont.

In 1849, the parish priest of Saint-Jérôme asked his bishop for permission to open a mission at the northern end of his vast parish and to build a chapel there. Ignace Bourget, bishop of the Roman Catholic Diocese of Montreal, approved the request on 29 October of that year, adding: 'Place it as soon as possible and give it the Circumcision of Our Lord as its patron saint'. The feast of the Circumcision and the feast of Saint-Sauveur were celebrated on 1 January. On 4 January 1853, the parishioners of Saint-Sauveur submitted a petition requesting the canonical erection of this part of the parish of Saint-Jérôme under the name of Saint-Sauveur. The bishop approved the request on 10 February 1854 under the name Saint-Sauveur.

The municipality of Saint-Sauveur was therefore created on 6 August 1855 from territories previously belonging to Saint-Jérôme and Abercrombie. The original territory included the current municipalities of Saint-Sauveur, Prévost, Piedmont, Sainte-Anne-des-Lacs and part of Sainte-Adèle. During its history, the territory was divided up on several occasions. In 1909, a section was taken for the creation of Shawbridge. In 1923, the Piedmont sector split to became its own independent municipality, this was followed by Saint-Sauveur-des-Monts in 1926, Prévost in 1927 and Sainte-Anne-des-Lacs in 1946. In 1956, another sector was taken away for the creation of the city of Mont-Gabriel (now part of Sainte-Adèle).

In 1895, lightning struck the chapel and it was destroyed. In 1903, parish priest Saint-Pierre succeeded in convincing the parishioners to build a stone church. On May 25, 1905, under the leadership of François-Xavier Clouthier, President of the Syndicate, the church was blessed in the presence of Mgr Racicot, Auxiliary Bishop of the Diocese of Montreal.

The current city of Saint-Sauveur was created in 2002 from the merger of Saint-Sauveur-des-Monts and Saint-Sauveur.

== Demographics ==
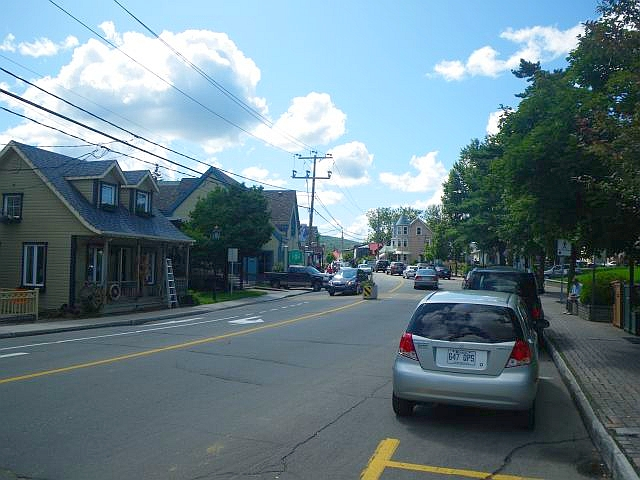
Rue Principale

In the 2021 Census of Population conducted by Statistics Canada, Saint-Sauveur had a population of 11,580 living in 5,936 of its 7,267 total private dwellings, a change of 13.2% from its 2016 population of 10,231. With a land area of 47.62 km^{2} (18.39 sq mi), it had a population density of 243.2/km^{2} (629.8/sq mi) in 2021.

Canada census – Saint-Sauveur community profile

	2021	2016	2011
Population	11,580 (+13.2% from 2016)	10,231 (+3.5% from 2011)	9,881 (+7.5% from 2006)
Land area	47.62 km^{2} (18.39 sq mi)	47.91 km^{2} (18.50 sq mi)	47.79 km^{2} (18.45 sq mi)
Population density	243.2/km^{2} (630/sq mi)	213.5/km^{2} (553/sq mi)	206.8/km^{2} (536/sq mi)
Median age	58.4 (M: 58.0, F: 59.2)	56.8 (M: 56.8, F: 56.8)	54.2 (M: 53.8, F: 54.5)
Private dwellings	7,267 (total) 5,936 (occupied)	6,802 (total)	6,636 (total)
Median household income	$71,000	$59,285	$62,473

References: 2021 2016 2011

Historical census populations – Saint-Sauveur, Quebec
Year	Pop.	±%
2006	9,191	—
2011	9,881	+7.5%
2016	10,231	+3.5%
2021	11,580	+13.2%
Source: Statistics Canada

Mother tongue (2021):

- English as first language: 7.1%
- French as first language: 86.8%
- English and French as first languages: 2.0%
- Other as first language: 3.5%

== Government ==
Saint-Sauveur is governed by a seven member council consisting of six councillors, and the mayor. The districts and current councillors are as follows:

District	Councillor
Mayor	Luc Martel
1	Nathalie Desjardins
2	Luc Leblanc
3	Carole Viau
4	Stéphanie Carrière
5	Sophie Coulombe
6	Carole Gagnon

List of former mayors since formation of current city:

- Georges Filion - 2002–2005
- Michel Lagacé - 2005–2013
- Jacques Gariépy - 2013–present

The first mayor of Saint-Sauveur was William Henry Scott, who took office in 1855 when the parish municipality was incorporated. The parish had 21 mayors from 1855 to 2002. The village of Saint-Sauveur-des-Monts was carved out of the parish municipality in 1926 and thereafter had its own council and mayor.

== Education ==
Sir Wilfrid Laurier School Board operates Anglophone public schools:

- Morin Heights Elementary School in Morin-Heights
- Laurentian Regional High School in Lachute

== Notable people ==
- Frédéric Allard, ice hockey player
- Omer Létourneau, organist, composer and conductor
- Kate and Anna McGarrigle, singer/songwriter duo, childhood home from about 1946 to 1960
- Chris Ramsay, Canadian magician and YouTuber

== Images ==
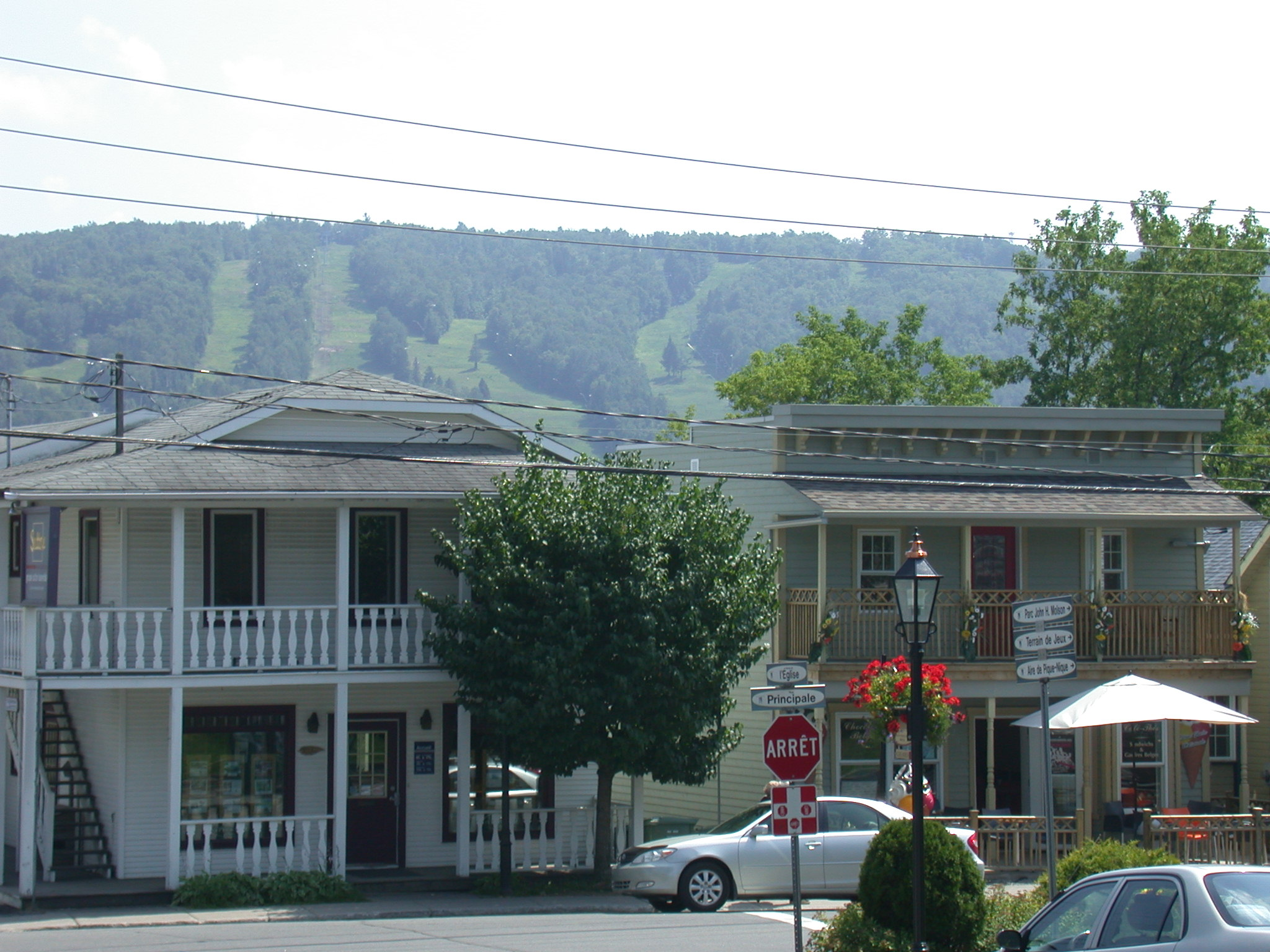
Saint-Sauveur Village

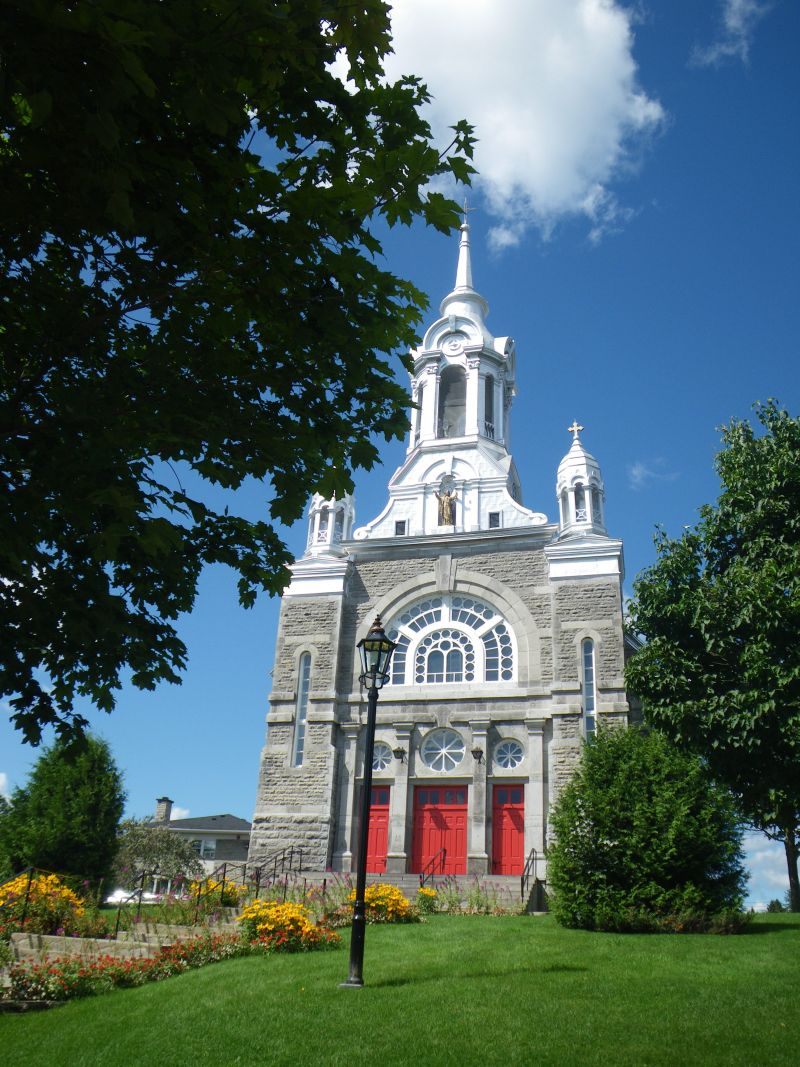
Church in Saint-Sauveur

== See also ==
- List of cities in Quebec
