= Ski Morin Heights =

Outdoor resort in Quebec, Canada

Sommet Morin Heights
- Interactive map of Sommet Morin Heights
- Location: Morin-Heights, Quebec, Canada
- Nearest city: Montreal, Quebec, Canada 83 km (52 mi)
- Coordinates: 45°53′58″N 74°16′06″W
- Vertical: 200 m (660 ft)
- Top elevation: 465 m (1,526 ft)
- Base elevation: 265 m (869 ft)
- Skiable area: 80 acres (0.32 km^{2})
- Trails: 35 total 29% Easy; 29% Intermediate; 29% Difficult; 14% Extremely difficult
- Lift system: 5 total 1 quadruple chair 3 triple chair 1 magic carpet
- Night skiing: 19 out of 35 trails
- Website: Sommet Morin Heights

Sommet Morin Heights is an all-year outdoor resort located in the Laurentian Mountains, more specifically in Morin Heights, Quebec. The resort, which is part of Les Sommets Inc., is equipped with the installations necessary to practice many types of activities, such as alpine skiing, cross country skiing, and snowboarding during the cold season, as well as mountain biking, zip lining and camping during the warm season months.

== Activities ==
In the winter, Sommet Morin-Heights offers downhill skiing, cross-country skiing, snowshoeing and winter camping. In the summer, the resort operates a campground with tent sites and rustic log cabins. On the mountain, there is a ziplining course (Acro-Nature) and mountain biking trails.

The main quadruple chairlift was replaced in 2024 by a new Dopplemayer Alpen Star chairlift, called Élévation.

== Incidents ==
In February 2011, a 13-year-old boy from Blainville died after crashing into a tree on the side of the trail. According to witnesses, he lost control over his skis in a trail designed for intermediate-level skiers and headed in the direction of the tree. The accident occurred around 7 p.m., time at which the ambulance arrived to transport the boy to the hospital, where his death was confirmed. This accident, according to a spokesperson of Les Sommets inc., was the first fatal accident to occur at Sommet Morin Heights since the mountain's acquisition by Les Sommets inc. in 1992.

On January 12, 2024, a 15-year-old boy fell to its death on the main fixed-grip quadruple lift of the mountain.

== See also ==
- Mont Saint-Sauveur International
