= Lake Guindon =

Lake in Sainte-Anne-des-Lacs, Quebec

- Location within Quebec
- Location: Sainte-Anne-des-Lacs, Quebec
- Coordinates: 45°52′03″N 74°06′54″W
- Basin countries: Canada

Lake Guindon is the name of a lake in Sainte-Anne-des-Lacs, Quebec. It is also the name of the community near the lake, and the former name of a post office there, which was subsequently renamed Sainte-Anne-des-Lacs.
