= Tim Watchorn =

Canadian politician

Tim Watchorn MP

Member of Parliament for Les Pays-d'en-Haut
- Incumbent
- Assumed office April 28, 2025
- Preceded by: Riding established

Personal details
- Party: Liberal

Tim Watchorn MP is a Canadian politician who was elected to the House of Commons in the 2025 federal election. He represents Les Pays-d'en-Haut as a member of the Liberal Party. Prior to his election, he was the mayor of Morin-Heights, Quebec.
