= Les Pays-d'en-Haut (electoral district) =

Federal electoral district in Quebec, Canada

Quebec electoral district
- Interactive map of riding boundaries from the 2025 federal election

Federal electoral district
- Legislature: House of Commons
MP
Tim Watchorn
Liberal
- District created: 2023
- First contested: 2025

Demographics
- Population (2021): 106,834
- Electors (2025): 94,957
- Census division(s): Les Pays-d'en-Haut, Argenteuil, Matawinie, Montcalm, La Rivière-du-Nord
- Census subdivision(s): Saint-Colomban, Sainte-Adèle, Prévost, Saint-Sauveur, Saint-Hippolyte, Saint-Calixte, Chertsey, Morin-Heights, Sainte-Anne-des-Lacs, Saint-Adolphe-d'Howard

Les Pays-d'en-Haut (English: The Upper Countries) is a federal electoral district in Quebec. It was created by the 2022 Canadian federal electoral redistribution and legally defined by the 2023 representation order for Quebec, which came into effect for the 2025 Canadian federal election.

== Geography ==
Les Pays-d'en-Haut was created to accommodate population growth in the Laurentides and Lanaudière regions. It comprises the Les Pays-d'en-Haut Regional County Municipality as well as parts of the neighbouring Regional County Municipalities of Argenteuil, Matawinie, Montcalm, and La Rivière-du-Nord.

== Demographics ==
According to the 2021 Canadian census

- Racial groups: 96.4% White, 1.7% Indigenous
- Languages: 91.5% French, 7.5% English
- Religions: 64.7% Christian (58.1% Catholic, 6.6% Other), 34.3% No religion
- Median income: $42,000 (2020)
- Average income: $53,950 (2020)

== History ==
| Parliament | Years | Member | Party |
|---|---|---|---|
Les Pays-d'en-Haut; Riding created from Argenteuil—La Petite-Nation, Joliette, Laurentides—Labelle, Mirabel, Montcalm, and Rivière-du-Nord
| 45th | 2025–present | Tim Watchorn | Liberal |

== Election results ==
2025 Canadian federal election
| Party | Candidate | Votes | % | ±% |
|---|---|---|---|---|
| Liberal | Tim Watchorn | 26,967 | 41.04 | +15.15 |
| Bloc Québécois | Ariane Charbonneau | 23,750 | 36.15 | -11.40 |
| Conservative | Vincent Leroux | 11,816 | 17.98 | +6.32 |
| New Democratic | Eric-Abel Baland | 1,493 | 2.27 | -4.61 |
| Green | Karine Steinberger | 1,038 | 1.58 | +0.05 |
| People's | George Mogiljansky | 639 | 0.97 | -3.35 |
| Total valid votes | | 65,703 | 98.73 | |
| Total rejected ballots | | 848 | 1.27 | -0.58 |
| Turnout | | 66,551 | 69.68 | +6.54 |
| Eligible voters | | 95,508 | | |
| Liberal notional gain from Bloc Québécois | | Swing | | +13.27 |
Source: Elections Canada

2021 federal election redistributed results
| Party | Vote | % |
|---|---|---|
| Bloc Québécois | 26,240 | 47.54 |
| Liberal | 14,290 | 25.89 |
| Conservative | 6,436 | 11.66 |
| New Democratic | 3,800 | 6.89 |
| People's | 2,388 | 4.33 |
| Free | 984 | 1.78 |
| Green | 844 | 1.53 |
| Rhinoceros | 83 | 0.15 |
| Pour l'Indépendance du Québec | 57 | 0.10 |
| Independent | 48 | 0.09 |
| Marijuana | 20 | 0.04 |
| Total valid votes | 55,190 | 98.15 |
| Rejected ballots | 1,043 | 1.85 |
| Registered voters/ estimated turnout | 89,054 | 63.14 |
