= Les Pays-d'en-Haut Regional County Municipality =

Les Pays-d'en-Haut
- Regional county municipality
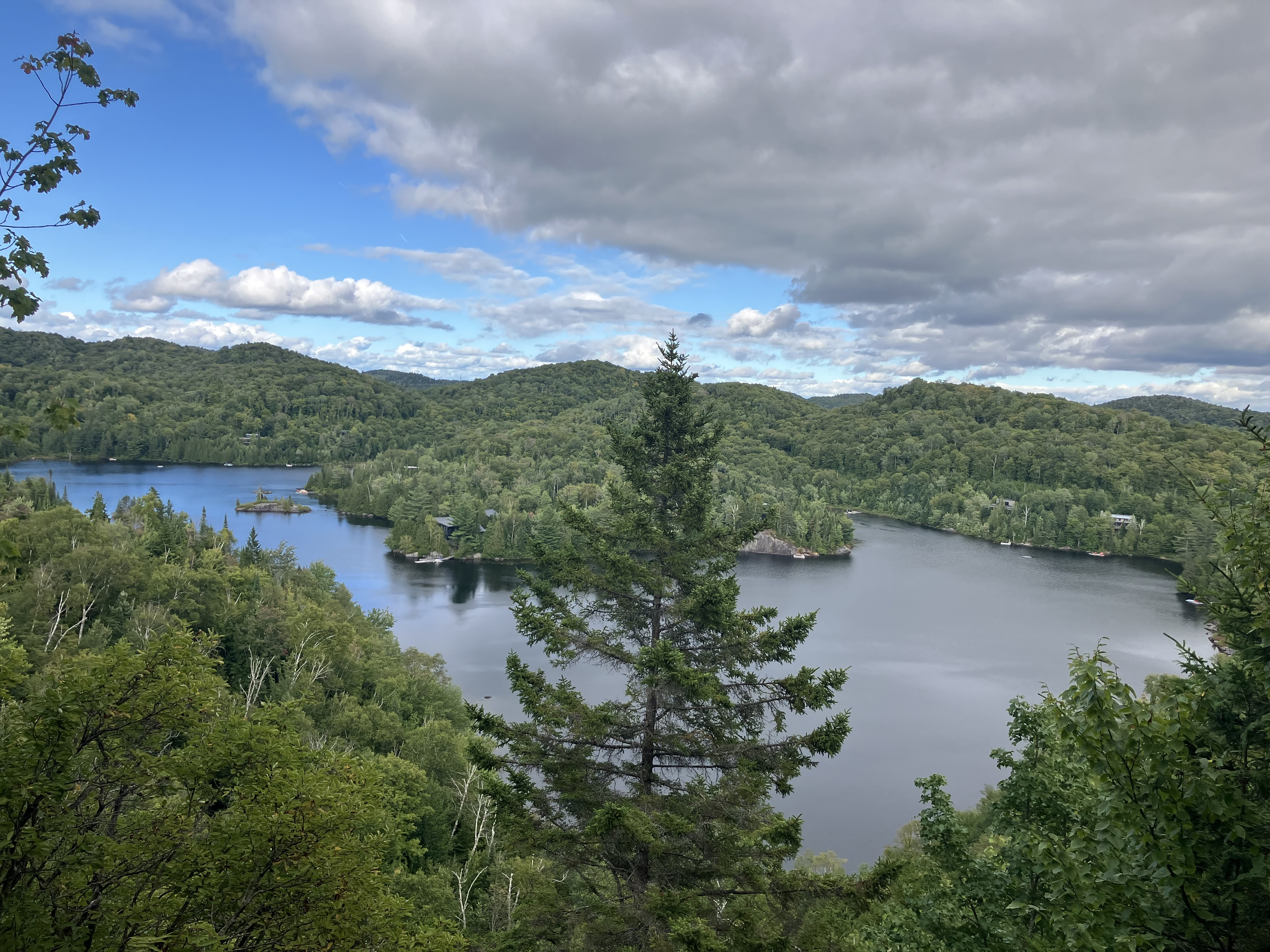

- Logo

- Location in province of Quebec.
- Coordinates: 45°57′N 74°08′W
- Country: Canada
- Province: Quebec
- Region: Laurentides
- Effective: 1 January 1983
- County seat: Sainte-Adèle

Government
  - Type: Prefecture
  - Prefect: Catherine Hamé

Area
  - Total: 737.40 km^{2} (284.71 sq mi)
  - Land: 683.46 km^{2} (263.89 sq mi)

Population (2016)
  - Total: 41,877
  - Density: 61.3/km^{2} (159/sq mi)
  - Change 2011-2016: ▲3.8%
  - Dwellings: 29,723
- Time zone: UTC−5 (EST)
  - Summer (DST): UTC−4 (EDT)
- Area codes: 450 and 579
- Website: www.lespaysdenhaut.com

Les Pays-d'En-Haut (French pronunciation: [le pɛi dɑ̃ o]) is a regional county municipality in the Laurentides region of Quebec, Canada. The population according to the 2016 Canadian Census was 41,877.

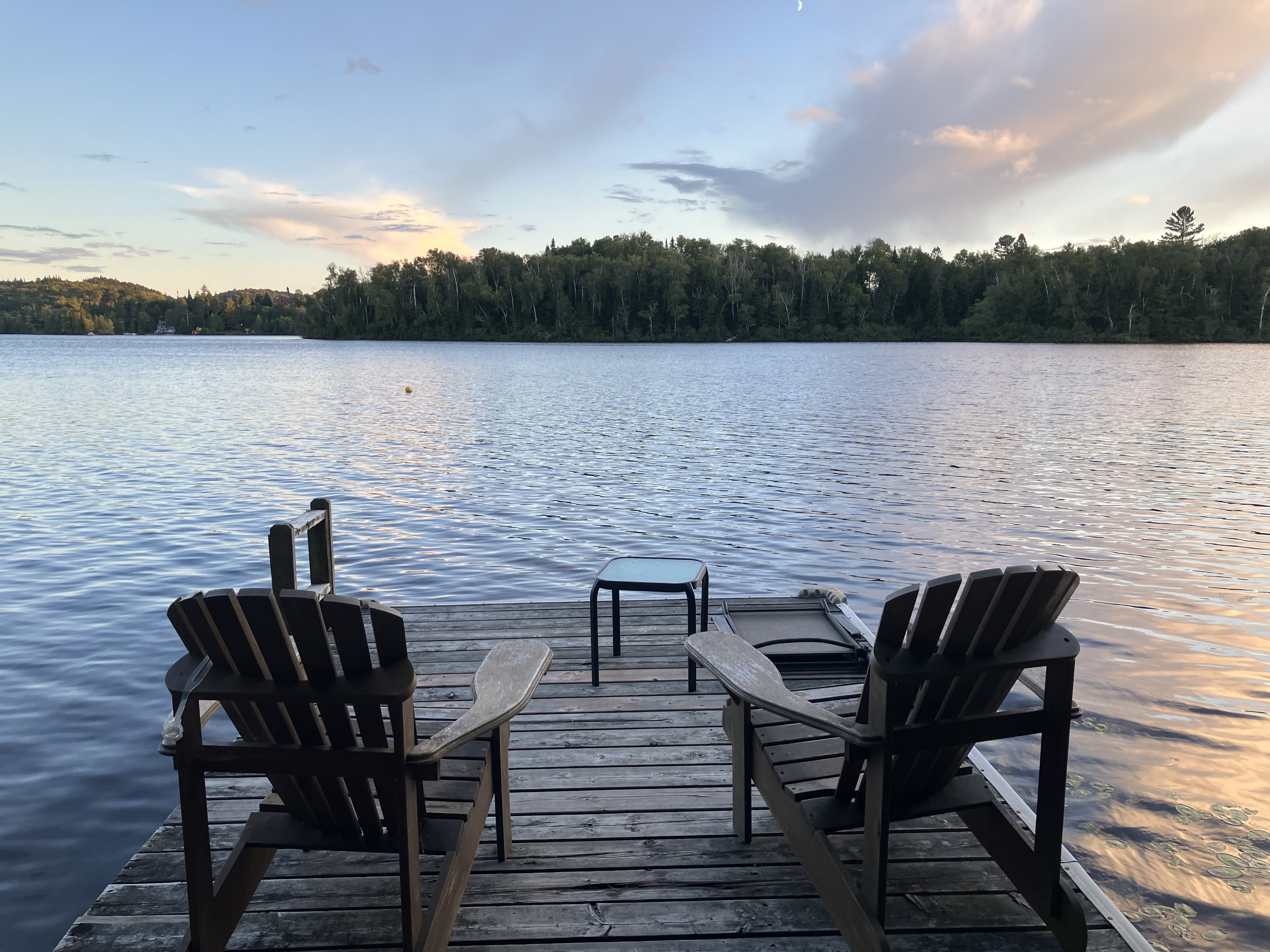
View of Lac Saint-Joseph

== Subdivisions ==
There are 10 subdivisions within the RCM:

Cities & Towns (4)

- Estérel
- Sainte-Adèle
- Sainte-Marguerite-du-Lac-Masson
- Saint-Sauveur

Municipalities (5)

- Lac-des-Seize-Îles
- Morin-Heights
- Piedmont
- Saint-Adolphe-d'Howard
- Wentworth-Nord

Parishes (1)

- Sainte-Anne-des-Lacs

== Demographics ==
=== Population ===
Canada census – Les Pays-d'en-Haut community profile

	2021	2016	2011
Population	46,906 (+12.0% from 2016)	41,877 (+3.8% from 2011)	40,331 (+10.3% from 2006)
Land area	673.98 km^{2} (260.23 sq mi)	683.46 km^{2} (263.89 sq mi)	685.41 km^{2} (264.64 sq mi)
Population density	69.6/km^{2} (180/sq mi)	61.3/km^{2} (159/sq mi)	58.8/km^{2} (152/sq mi)
Median age	56.0 (M: 56.0, F: 56.4)	54.5 (M: 54.5, F: 54.4)	51.4 (M: 51.5, F: 51.4)
Private dwellings	31,300 (total) 23,530 (occupied)	29,723 (total)	28,593 (total)
Median household income	$72,500	$58,800	$52,232

References: 2021 2016 2011

Historical Census Data - Les Pays-d'en-Haut Regional County Municipality, Quebec

Year	Pop.	±%
1991	22,589	—
1996	28,237	+25.0%

Year	Pop.	±%
2001	30,866	+9.3%
2006	36,573	+18.5%

Year	Pop.	±%
2011	40,331	+10.3%
2016	41,877	+3.8%

=== Language ===
Canada Census Mother Tongue - Les Pays-d'en-Haut Regional County Municipality, Quebec
Census	Total	French			English			French & English			Other		
Year	Responses	Count	Trend	Pop %	Count	Trend	Pop %	Count	Trend	Pop %	Count	Trend	Pop %
2021	46,660	40,460	▲10.44%	86.71%	3,480	▲9.77%	7.45%	955	▲107%	2%	1,545	▲8.8%	3.31%
2016	41,685	36,635	▲5.3%	87.9%	3,170	▼5.4%	7.6%	460	0%	1.1%	1,420	▼15.9%	3.4%
2011	39,830	34,795	▲11.8%	87.36%	3,350	▲2.1%	8.41%	460	▲35.3%	1.15%	1,225	▼11.5%	3.08%
2006	36,120	31,115	▲19.1%	86.14%	3,280	▲8.4%	9.08%	340	▼0.1%	0.94%	1,385	▲45.0%	3.83%
2001	30,460	26,135	▲10.3%	85.80%	3,025	▲0.2%	9.93%	345	▼13.8%	1.13%	955	▲29.1%	3.14%
1996	27,855	23,695	n/a	85.06%	3,020	n/a	10.84%	400	n/a	1.44%	740	n/a	2.66%

== Transportation ==
=== Access Routes ===
Highways and numbered routes that run through the municipality, including external routes that start or finish at the county border:

- Autoroutes
  - A-15 (TCH)
- Principal Highways
  - R-117
- Secondary Highways
  - R-329
  - R-364
  - R-370
- External Routes
  - None

== See also ==
- List of regional county municipalities and equivalent territories in Quebec
