= Morin-Heights =

- Municipality
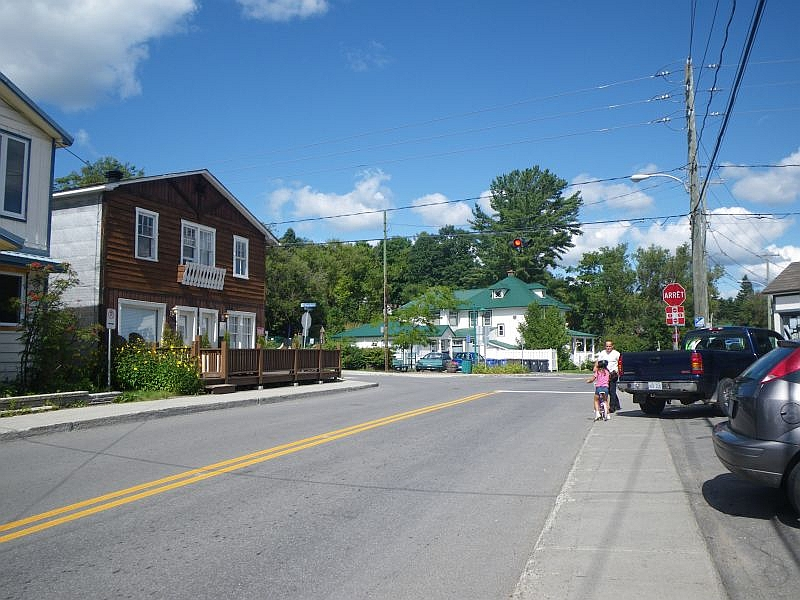
- Downtown Morin-Heights
- Motto: L'harmonie c'est dans notre nature
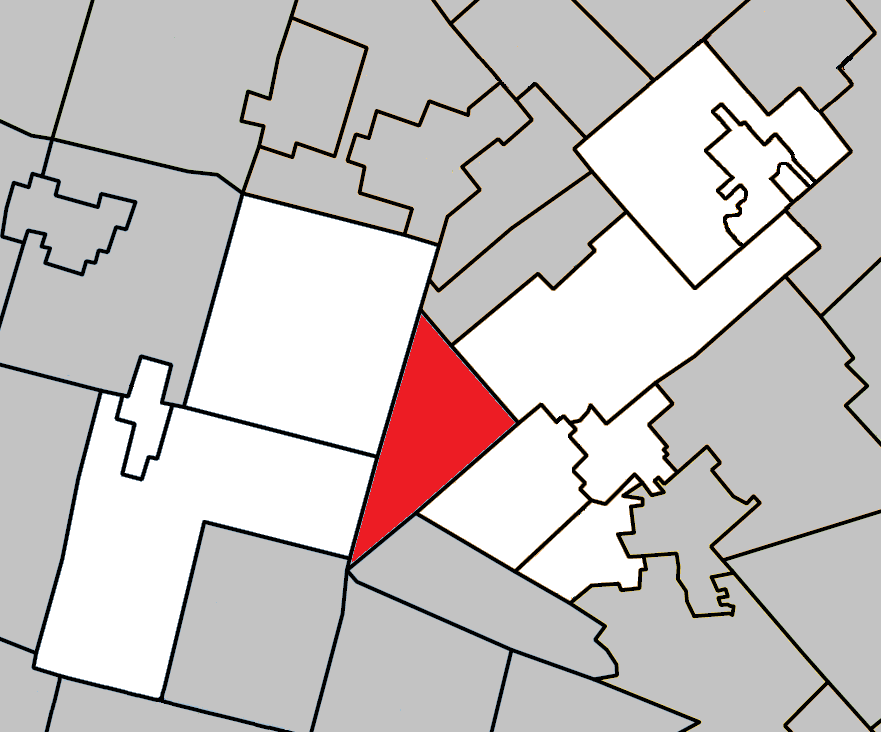
- Location within Les Pays-d'en-Haut RCM

- Location in central Quebec
- Coordinates: 45°54′N 74°15′W
- Country: Canada
- Province: Quebec
- Region: Laurentides
- RCM: Les Pays-d'en-Haut
- Settled: 1850
- Constituted: July 1, 1855

Government
  - Mayor: Louise Cossette
  - Federal riding: Les Pays-d'en-Haut
  - Prov. riding: Argenteuil

Area
  - Total: 59.38 km^{2} (22.93 sq mi)
  - Land: 55.96 km^{2} (21.61 sq mi)

Population (2021)
  - Total: 4,678
  - Density: 83.6/km^{2} (217/sq mi)
  - Pop (2016–21): ▲12.9%
  - Dwellings: 2,762
- Demonym(s): Haut-Morinois, oise
- Time zone: UTC−5 (EST)
  - Summer (DST): UTC−4 (EDT)
- Postal code(s): J0R 1H0
- Area codes: 450 and 579
- Highways: R-329 R-364
- Website: www.morinheights.com

Morin-Heights (French pronunciation: [mɔɹinajts]) is a town in the Laurentian Mountains region of Quebec, Canada. It is west of Saint-Sauveur and north of Lachute; municipally, it is within the Regional County Municipality of Les Pays-d'en-Haut. It is primarily a tourist town known for its skiing.

== History ==
The first European settlers of the municipality were Anglophones of Irish origin, arriving from Ireland around 1850. They were followed by Francophone settlers from Lachute, Saint-Jérôme and Saint-Eustache. The township was named after its founder, 19th-century politician Augustin-Norbert Morin, who had at that point a huge farm of more than three square kilometres (1.2 sq mi) on the banks of the Rivière du Nord, built around 1850–1860 and included a home, saw mill, and flour mill. An alternate, less accepted origin for the name Morin concerns an engineer named Morin who was dispatched by the provincial government to survey the region and had hired a Native American named Simon as guide, whose name was used to identify the river flowing through the township. The "Heights" part in the name probably refers to the town's high elevation.

In 1852, the Morin Township was formed. In 1855, the Township Municipality of Morin-Partie-Sud was established in a part of the township (the remaining part became Sainte-Adèle). Until 1911, the territory had the names of Bas-Morin or Morin Flats, name of the post office between 1875 and 1911, while the railway station was known as Morin-Heights Station. In 1950, Morin-Partie-Sud changed its statutes and name to become the municipality of Morin-Heights, going from a township to municipality.

On 4 October 1994, members of the Order of the Solar Temple took part in a mass-murder suicide in Morin-Heights. The members of the group murdered a family of ex-members, including their baby, before setting their chalet on fire and dying in the blaze. Members of the group had in 1992 purchased properties in Morin-Heights and Saint-Sauveur.

On March 12, 2008, a roof collapse in the Gourmet du Village bakery warehouse killed three women. An excessive accumulation of snow was suspected to be the cause of the accident. A total of 40 people were in the building at the time of the collapse.

== Geography ==
Morin-Heights is west of Saint-Sauveur and north of Lachute; municipally, it is within the Regional County Municipality of Les Pays-d'en-Haut. It is about 60 km northwest of Montreal. Running through the municipality is the Simon river; there are several bodies of water, including Lac Bouchette, Lac Écho, Lac Cook and part of Lac Théodore.

== Demographics ==
In the 2021 Census of Population conducted by Statistics Canada, Morin-Heights had a population of 4,678 living in 2,211 of its 2,762 total private dwellings, a change of 12.9% from its 2016 population of 4,145. With a land area of 55.96 km^{2} (21.61 sq mi), it had a population density of 83.6/km^{2} (216.5/sq mi) in 2021.

Canada census – Morin-Heights community profile

	2021	2016
Population	4,678 (+12.9% from 2016)	4,145 (+5.6% from 2011)
Land area	55.96 km^{2} (21.61 sq mi)	56.66 km^{2} (21.88 sq mi)
Population density	83.6/km^{2} (217/sq mi)	73.2/km^{2} (190/sq mi)
Median age	54.4 (M: 55.2, F: 53.6)	52.7 (M: 52.9, F: 52.6)
Private dwellings	2,762 (total)	2,610 (total)
Median household income	$86,000	$69,427

References: 2021 2016

Historical census populations – Morin-Heights

Year	Pop.	±%
1861	454	—
1871	506	+11.5%
1881	558	+10.3%
1891	471	−15.6%
1901	484	+2.8%
1911	498	+2.9%
1921	593	+19.1%
1931	594	+0.2%

Year	Pop.	±%
1941	671	+13.0%
1951	872	+30.0%
1956	1,001	+14.8%
1961	1,262	+26.1%
1966	1,143	−9.4%
1971	1,316	+15.1%
1976	1,363	+3.6%
1981	1,563	+14.7%

Year	Pop.	±%
1986	1,676	+7.2%
1991	1,960	+16.9%
1996	2,332	+19.0%
2001	2,575	+10.4%
2006	3,503	+36.0%
2011	3,925	+12.0%
2016	4,145	+5.6%
2021	4,678	+12.9%

Source: Statistics Canada

Private dwellings occupied by usual residents (2021): 2211 (total dwellings: 2762)

Mother tongue (2021):

- English: 17%
- French: 74.8%
- English and French: 3.3%
- Other language only: 4.5%

== Economy ==
It is primarily a tourist town known for its skiing. It has a large ski hill (Ski Morin Heights) that is popular during the winter months and being on a recreational trailway (the Aerobic Corridor), which is used year-round. A dense network of hiking, cross country skiing, snowshoeing and mountain biking trails surround Morin-Heights, making it the closest multi-recreational outdoor hub to Montreal (45-minute drive in moderate traffic). The old train station, on Lac Écho road, is the starting point for most recreational activities, year-round.

Formerly located just south of the town was a recording studio, called Le Studio, built in 1974, which is now closed. The facility was used by numerous Canadian and international artists. In 1994, another important music recording facility was built in Morin-Heights, on the northern edge of town. Conceived and built by Swedish-born artist Lars Westvind, Studio Nomade exclusively hosted Sarah McLachlan's recording projects up to 2000. It then was open to other artists, and is still a frequently used production facility. The town hosts a theatre company featuring mostly English-language plays, as well as a choir.

== Education ==
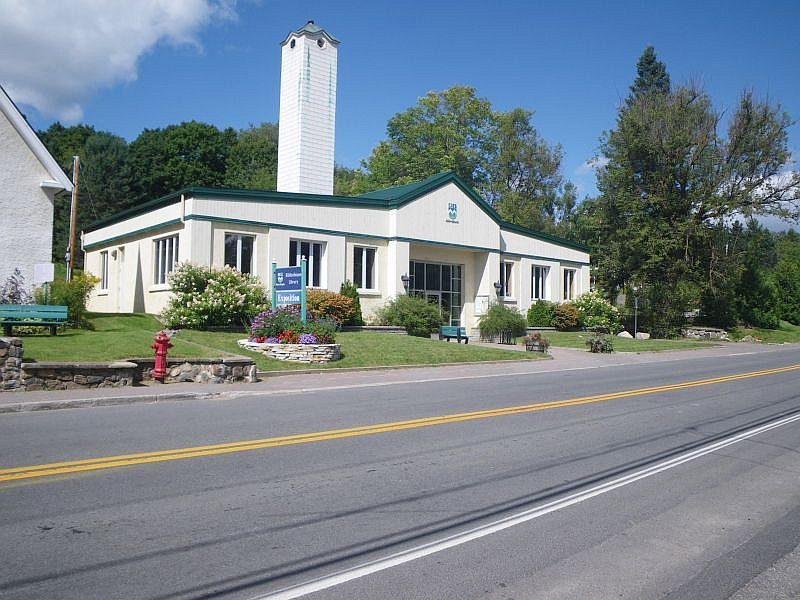
Morin-Heights Library

Sir Wilfrid Laurier School Board operates Anglophone public schools:

- Morin-Heights Elementary School
- Laurentian Regional High School in Lachute

Morin-Heights Library serves the community.

== See also ==
- List of municipalities in Quebec
