= 1613 in Quebec =

Events from the year 1613 in Quebec.

== Events ==
- Samuel de Champlain returned to Quebec, having been appointed Lieutenant General of New France by King Louis XIII. de Champlain thus became the first Lieutenant General of the colony who resides in New France.
- de Champlain traveled up the Ottawa River, eventually meeting with the Algonquin Chief Tessouat. The Algonquins were offered a fort by the French if they agreed to resettle to the area of the Lachine Rapids.
- English colonists from Virginia under the leadership of Samuel Argall attacked the French settlement of Port Royal, killing and kidnapping many colonists.
