= Pieskaret =

Pieskaret (pronounced pees-ka'-ret) (died 1647) was a chief of the Adirondac Indians. His tribe fought against the English forces, helping the French in the early 17th century. The Adirondacs under him drove the Haudenosaunee Confederacy (Iroquois) out of Canada.

Known as "the terror of the Iroquois", Pieskaret (also variously spelled or rendered Pieskaret, Diescaret, Piescars) was the chief of the Tessouat tribe, whose territory lies in present-day Quebec. The name Pieskaret means "Little Blaze", and was most likely a French corruption of an Algonquin name which includes the word Piskone, which means "lights a fire". To the colonials, Pieskaret was known by his Christian name, Chief Simon. Pieskaret was a distinguished war leader who was known for his exploits against the Haudenosaunee. The Haudenosaunee were enemies of the Algonquin at that time. Chief Pieskaret was a French ally and also an early Catholic convert. The Algonquins described him as " a very brave man," and the Jesuits wrote that Pieskaret was "a man somewhat noted among his people". While Pieskaret became well-known, very few incidents have been recorded of his life. Charlevoix (New France, II, 181,1866) stated that Pieskaret was "one of the bravest men ever seen in Canada, and almost incredible stories are told of his prowess. Pieskaret died in 1647.

== Battles ==
In 1643 Pieskaret was thought to be dead, and so he was mourned. It was believed that he had been captured by his tribe's enemies, the Haudenosaunee. This was proven incorrect when he appeared with the band and with the head of the enemy. Due to a swift break-up of the river, Pieskaret was able to escape the Haudenosaunee. His return was met with great joy and was "celebrated with dancing and a council was held after which Pieskaret and Tessouat (d.1654) reported to Chomedey de Maisonneuve their intention to go to Trois-Rivières to formulate plans for the future and to determine if the French were to keep their promise of assistance against the enemy". In or around early spring of 1645, when it was still necessary to pull their canoes onto the ice on the St. Lawrence River from Richelieu River to Lake Champlain, Pieskaret assembled another war party. On Richelieu River, they were met with five boats and a band of 50 Haudenosaunee. Pieskaret and his followers raided this band of Haudenosaunee and killed several of them. This raid was successful and took two captives. According to custom, the captives could be seen dancing in the canoes, and enemy scalps floated from long sticks while they were returning to the mission at Sillery. One of the captive Haudenosaunee was Honatteniate, who was treated with kindness by the residents of Sillery. The captive Haudenosaunee were handed to the first governor of New France, Huault de Montmagny. After this, he sent word to the Haudenosaunee that the captives would be set free if the Haudenosaunee were disposed to negotiate for peace. The result of this action led to the arrival of the Mohawk chief Kiotseaeton, who was an ambassador for the Haudenosaunee, in July.

After the arrival of Kiotseaeton, a peace council was held with the Haudenosaunee, the French, the Wendat, the Algonquins, and the Innu. At the end of this peace council, Pieskaret presented furs that symbolized a rock or a tomb to the Haudenosaunee ambassador. The furs were meant to be placed on the victims' graves from the battle that was fought, signifying that they might all be forgiven and that no revenge was to be sought. From 1645 to 1646, there were very important peace and trade negotiations that allowed the Mohawks a share of the northern fur trade. This secretly excluded the pagan Algonquins from French protection.

Due to the growing intensity of the Haudenosaunee threat from 1646 to 1647, many tribes began to take up residence in the Trois-Rivières area. These events created confusion, creating controversy. In order to solve these issues, the Indians designated Pieskaret to keep the peace between the French and the Indians as well as to keep the peace between the Hurons and the Algonquins. Given the power to punish delinquents, especially if they were at fault for religious reasons, Pieskaret is said to have discharged his duty faithfully.

== Christianity and later years ==
Pieskaret was baptized at Trois-Rivières in 1640 or 1641. He was given the name of Simon by the governor of Trois-Rivières, M. de Champflour. From 1646 to 1647, Pieskaret was very affected by the sudden death of a Christian convert and nephew of Tessouat, Joseph Oumasasikweie. He made a public confession and renewed his faith, which he had originally accepted mainly for diplomatic reasons.

Pieskaret's open acceptance of Christianity may have indirectly been the cause of his death. While returning a hunt on the north shore of St. Lawrence, Pieskaret was met by a band of Haudenosaunee (who were allowed to hunt in the area due to the treaty in 1645), who were singing a peace song. Even though the rumors of the secret clause in a treaty were already known by Pieskaret and there was an overall fear of an attack, he counted on his faith to protect him and he smoked a pipe with the Haudenosaunee. They all were respectful to each other, but when Pieskaret continued on his journey he was killed and scalped by one of the Haudenosaunee who had lagged behind.

== In folklore and culture ==
There are many stories about the prowess of Pieskaret. For example, Perrot recounts that at one time Pieskaret entered an Haudenosaunee village and killed a whole family, then hid in the family's woodpiles for two nights and was found on the third. The story is that he fled, and by being agile and nimble was able to outrun those who were chasing him while he took refuge in a tree trunk. When the Haudenosaunee set up a camp near him, Pieskaret killed them all in their sleep and "came back laden with their scalps." Another tale states that at the mouth of the Sorel River, Pieskaret along with four others sank five Haudenosaunee canoes by lighting them on fire. They then killed all of their enemies except for two captives that had been traveling with them.
