= List of Nipissing ethnonyms =

This is a list of various names the Nipissing have been recorded.

== Endonyms ==
=== Anishinaabe(g) ===
The most general name for the Nipissing is Anishinaabe. Though several definitions are given for this name, the most common one is "spontaneous men", referring to their creation as being ex nihlo, thus being the "Original men." When syncoped, the name appears as "Nishnaabe".

=== Nibiinsing ===
The general term for the Nipissing peoples arise from the Anishinaabe word Nibii(n)sing, meaning "at the little water". When the name is syncoped, it can appear as either Nbii(n)sing, Mbii(n)sing or Bii(n)sing.

- Neperinks. — Clinton (1745) in New York Documents of Colonial History, VI, 276, 1855.
- Nepesangs. — Pike, Expedition, pt. 1, appendix, 62, 1810.
- Nepesinks. — Clinton (1745) in New York Documents of Colonial History, VI, 281, 1855.
- Nepessins. — Buchanan, North American Indians, I, 139, 1824.
- Nepisin. — Dobbs, Hudson Bay, map, 1744.
- Nepisinguis. — Mackenzie, Voyage, xlii, 1801.
- Nepissens. — Bondinot, Star in the West, 127, 1816.
- Nepissings. — "Document of 1695" in New York Documents of Colonial History, IX, 599, 1855.
- Népissingues. — New York Documents of Colonial History, IX, 602, 1855.
- Nipisings. — Cox, Columbia R., II. 142, 1831.
- Nipisingues. — Henry, Travels, 30, 1809.
- Nipisinks. — "German Flats conference (1770)" in New York Documents of Colonial History, VIII, 229, 1857.
- Nipissings. — "Document of 1741" in New York Documents of Colonial History, IX, 1080, 1855.
- Nipissingues. — Du Chesneau (1679) in New York Documents of Colonial History, IX, 133, 1855.
- Nipissins. — Smith, Bouquet's Expedition, 69, 1766.
- Nipístingues. — Lettres Edif. I, 696, 1838.
- Nippsingues. — Frontenac (1682) in New York Documents of Colonial History, IX, 182, 1855.
- Nipsang. — Lear (1792) in Am. St. Pap., Indian Affairs, I, 244, 1832.
- Nypissings. — Lamberville (1686) in New York Documents of Colonial History, III, 489, 1853.
- Nypsins. — Long, Expedition of St. Peters River, II, 151, 1824.

=== Nibiinsinini(wag)/Nibiinsininii(g) ===
The Nibiinsinini(wag) and Nibiinsininii(g) names are a slight variation of Nibiinsing. This variant name means "Man (men) of the little water", though John Trumbull translates the name as "small lake men". The Nibiinsinini(wag) reflects the Ojibwa and Odaawaa pronunciation of the name, while Nibiinsininii(g) reflects the Algonquin pronunciation of the same name. When syncoped the name appears as Nbiinsnini/Nbiinsninwag, Mbiinsnini/Mbiinsninwag or Biinsnini/Biinsninwag.

- Biserenis. — Champlain (1632). Carte de la Nouvelle-France augmentée depuis la derniere, servant à la navigation faicte de son vray meridien / par le Sr. Champlain.
- Bisserains. — Champlain (ca. 1624), Œuvres, V, 2d pt., 79. 1870.
- Bisseriniens. — Sagard (1636). Can., I, 190, 1866.
- Bissiriniens. — Jesuit Relations: 1635, 18, 1858.
- Byssiriniens. — Charlevoix (1744), New France, II, 95, 1866.
- Ebicerinys. — Sagard (1636), Can., I, 172, 1866.
- Epesengles. — McKenney and Hall, Indian Tribes, III, 80, 1854.
- Epicerinyens. — Sagard (1636), Can., III, 727, 1866.
- Epicerinys. — Sagard (1636), Can., IV, Huron Dictionary, 1866.
- Epiciriniens. — Sagard (1636) quoted by Parkman, Pioneers, 351, 1883.
- Episingles. — Dumont, Mem. of La., VI, 135, 1753.
- Epissingue. — "Writer of 1756" in New York Documents of Colonial History, X, 485, 1858.
- Nebicerini. — Champlain (1613). Œuvres, III, 295, 1870.
- Nepicerinis. — Lahontan, New Voyage, I, 143, 1703.
- Nepicinquis. — La Chauvignerie (1736) quoted by Schoolcraft, Indian Tribes, III, 554, 1853.
- Nepicirenians. — Heriot, Travels, 195, 1807.
- Nepiciriniens. — Bacqueville de la Potherie, II, 48. 1753.
- Nepiscenicens. — Boudinot, Star in the West, 127, 1816.
- Nepiseriniens. — La Barre (1682) in New York Documents of Colonial History, IX, 599, 1855.
- Nepisirini. — Lahontan, New Voyage, I, 231, 1703.
- Nepisseniniens. — "Document of 1695" in New York Documents of Colonial History, IX, 599, 1855.
- Nepisseriens. — Du Chesneau (1681) in New York Documents of Colonial History, IX, 160, 1855.
- Nepisseriniens. — "Document of 1697" in New York Documents of Colonial History, IX, 669, 1855.
- Népissiniens. — New York Documents of Colonial History, IX, 596, 1855.
- Nepissiriens. — Du Chesneau (1681) in New York Documents of Colonial History, IX, 160, 1855.
- Nepissiriniens. — "Document of 1693" in New York Documents of Colonial History, IX, 566, 1855.
- Nibissiriniens. — Parkman, Pioneers, 351, 1883.
- Nipeceriniens. — Colden (1727), Five Nations, 28, 1747.
- Nipercineans. — Schoolcraft, Indian Tribes, I, 307, 1851.
- Nipicirinien. — Jesuit Relations: 1639, 14, 1858.
- Nipisierinij. — Champlain (1615), Œuvres, IV, 21, 1870.
- Nipisiriniens. — Jesuit Relations: 1636, 69, 1858.
- Nipissiriniens. — Jesuit Relations: 1641, 81, 1858.
- Nipissirinioek. — Trumbull, Algonkian Names for Man, 18, 1871.
- Pisierinii. — Champlain (1616), Œuvres, IV, 61, 1870.
- Pisirinins. — Champlain (1616), Œuvres, IV, 63, 1870.

=== Odishkwaagamii(g) ===
Among the Anishinaabe peoples, the Nipissings and the Algonquins are collectively called Odishkwaagamii(g) (syncoped as Dishkwaagmii(g)), meaning "[those] at the end of the lakewater," but Jean Cuoq translates the name as "[those] at the last water," from ishkwaa ("end") and gami ("lakewater"). Chamberlain prefers "[people] on the otherside of the lake" though Chamberlin's translation would be for the Odagaamii(g) — the Fox. Among the Nipissings, though, they call themselves Odishkwaagamii(g) and call the Algonquins Omaamiwinini(wag) — the "downstream man (men)".

- Juskwaugume. — Jones, Ojebway Indians, 178, 1861.
- Odishk-wa-gami. — Baraga, English-Otchipwe Dictionary, II, 1878.
- Odishkwa-Gamig. — Trumbull, Algonkian Names for Man, 18. 1872.
- O-dish-quag-um-eeg. — Schoolcraft, Indian Tribes, II, 139, 1852.
- O-dish-quag-um-ees. — Ramsey in Indian Affairs Report, 91, 1850.
- Odishquahgumme. — Wilson, Ojebway Language, 157, 1874.
- Otick-waga-mi. — Cuoq, Lexique Iroquois, 42, 1882.
- Outiskoüagami. — Jesuit Relations: 1671, 35, 1858.
- Outisquagamis. — Andre (1671) quoted by Shea, Catholic Missions, 365, 1855.
- Tuskwawgomeeg. — Tanner, Narrative, 318, 1830.

== Exonyms ==
=== Iroquoian name ===
Due to the Midewiwin practices of the Anishinaabe peoples in general, the Iroquoian and derived names for the Nipissing associates them as "sorcerers".

- Askicȣaneronons. — Jesuit Relations: 1639, 88, 1858.
- Askikȣanehronons. — Jesuit Relations: 1641, 81, 1858.
- Askikouaneronons. — Jesuit Relations: 1641, 81, 1858.
- Aweatsiwaenrrhonon. — Jesuit Relations, Thwaites ed., X, 83, 1897.
- Kekerannon-rounons. — Lamberville (1686) in New York Documents of Colonial History, III, 489, 1853.
- Nation des Sorciers. — Jesuit Relations: 1632, 14, 1858. (French translation of the Iroquoian name)
- Quiennontateronons. — Sagard (1636), Canada, IV, index, 1866.
- Quieunontateronons. — Sagard (1636), Canada, III, 750, 1866.
- Skaghnanes. — "Mess. of 1763" in New York Documents of Colonial History, VII, 544, 1856.
- Skaghquanoghronos. — Johnson (1763) in New York Documents of Colonial History, VII, 582, 1856.
- Skecaneronons. — Sagard (1636), Canada, III, 727, 1866.
- Skekaneronons. — Sagard (1636), Canada, I, 148, 1866.
- Skekwanen-hronon. — Cuoq, Lexique Iroqois, 42, 1883 (Mohawk name).
- Skequaneronon. — Sagard (1632), Canada, IV, Huron Dictionary, 1866.
- Skighquan. — Livingston (1701) in New York Documents of Colonial History, IV, 899, 1854.
- Sorcerers. — Maclean, Canadian Savage Folk, 359, 1896 (English rendering of Nation des Sorciers)
- Squekaneronons. — Sngard (1636), Canada, I, 172, 1866 (Huron name).

=== French names ===
- Ilgonquines. — La Salle (1682) in French, Historical Collections of Louisiana, I, 46, 1846.
- Longs Cheveux. — Jesuit Relations: 1671, 35, 1858.

== See also ==
- Algonquin ethnonyms
- Ojibwa ethnonyms
- Potawatomi ethnonyms
