= List of Potawatomi ethnonyms =

This is a list of various names the Potawatomi have been recorded.

== Endonyms ==
=== Neshnabé ===
Neshnabé (without syncope: Eneshenabé), a cognate of Ojibwe Anishinaabe, meaning "Original People." The plural is Neshnabék.

=== Bodéwadmi ===
Bodéwadmi (without syncope: Bodéwademi), a cognate of Ojibwe "Boodewaadamii". It means "those who keep/tend the hearth-fire", which in this case refers to the hearth of the Council of Three Fires. The word itself comes from "to keep/tend the hearth-fire", which is "bodewadm" (without syncope: "bodewadem"; Ojibwe "boodawaadam"). The plural is Bodéwadmik.

- Oupouteouatamik – Jesuit Relations: 1658, 21, 1858.
- Patawatimes – Treaty of Greenville (1795) quoted by Harris, Tour, 249, 1805.
- Patawattamies – Turkey Creek treaty (1836) in U. S. Ind. Treaties, 648,1837.
- Patawattomies – Hunter, Captivity, 14, 1823.
- Pattawatamies – Hamtramck (1790) in Am. St. Papers, Ind. Aff., I, 87, 1832.
- Patawatima – Treaty of Fort Harmar (1789), ibid., 6.
- Pattawatimees – Jones, Ojebway Inds., 238, 1861.
- Pattawatimy – De Butts (1795) in Am. St. Papers, Ind. Aff., I, 565, 1832.
- Pattawatomie – Washington treaty (1868) in U. S. Ind. Treat., 691, 1873.
- Pattattamees – Wilkinson (1791) quoted by Rupp, W. Penn., app., 236, 1846.
- Pattawattomies – Hunter, Narr., 192, 1823.
- Pattawattomis – Heckewelder quoted by Barton, New Views, app., 3, 1798.
- Pattiwatima – Knox (1789) in Am. St. Papers, Ind. Aff ., I, 8, 1832.
- Pa-tu-átami – Gatschet, Kaw MS. vocab., B. A. E., 27, 1878 (Kansa form).
- Pautawatimis – Doc. of 1712 quoted by Gale, Upper Miss., 61, 1867.
- Pautawattamies – Conf. of 1766 in N. Y Doc. Col. Hist., VII, 854, 1856.
- Pauteauamis – La Chauvignerie (1736) quoted by Schoolcraft, Ind. Tribes, III, 556, 1853.
- Pedadumies – Schoolcraft, ibid., V, 196, 1855.
- Peoutewatamie – Ft Harmar treaty (1789) in U. S. Ind. Treat., 27, 1837.
- Po-da-wand-um-ee – Schoolcraft, Ind. Tribes, II, 139, 1852.
- Po-da-waud-umeeg – Warren (1852) in Minn. Hist. Soc. Coll., V, 32, 1885.
- Ponkeontamis – Morse, N., Am., 256, 1776 (misprint).
- Ponteatamies – Gage (1764) in N. Y. Doc. Col. Hist., VII, 656, 1856.
- Ponteòtamies – Bouquet (1764) quoted by Jefferson, Notes, 143, 1825.
- Pontewatamis – Lattré, map, 1784.
- Pontowattimies – Carver, Trav., 19, 1778.
- Poodawahduhme – Jones, Ojebway Inds., 180, 1861.
- Potavalamia – Tonti, Rel.de la Le., 100, 1720.
- Potawahduhmee – Jones, Ojebway Inds., 178, 1861.
- Potawatama – Perkins and Peck, Annals of the West, 295, 1850.
- Potawatamies – Ind. Aff. Rep., 144, 1827.
- Potawatamis – Johnson (1765) in N. Y . Doc. Col. Hist., VII, 711, 1856.
- Potawatimie – Spring Wells treaty (1815) in U. S. Ind. Treat., 173, 1837.
- Po^{2}-ta^{4}-w`a^{3}-to^{1}/-me^{1} – Long, Exped. St Peter's R., I, 91, 1824 (own name).
- Potawatomis – Ibid., 81.
- Potawattamies – Wilkinson (1791) quoted by Rupp, W. Penn., app., 236, 1846.
- Potawattimie – Treaty of Tippecanoe (1836) in U. S. Ind. Treat.,. 709, 1873.
- Potawattomies – Tanner, Narr., 245, 1830.
- Potawatumies – Warren (1852) in Minn. Hist. Soc. Coll., V, 124, 1885.
- Pŏ-tă-waw-tō/-mē – Dunn, True Indian Stories, 299, 1908 (given as Keating's pronunciation).
- Pō-tă-wŏt-mē – Ibid. (given as a Potawatomi pronunciation).
- Potawtumies – Lindesay (1749) in N. Y. Doc. Col. Hist., VI, 538, 1855.
- Poteotamis – Montcalm (1757), ibid., X, 553, 1858.
- Potéoüatami – Jesuit Relations: for 1671, 25, 1858.
- Poteouatamis – Vater, Mith., pt, 3, sec. 3, 351, 1816.
- Potewatamies – Gallatin in Trans. Am. Ethnol., Soc., II, civ, 1846.
- Potewatamik – Gatschet, Ojibwa MS., B. A. E., 1882 (Chippewa name).
- Potiwattimeeg – Tanner, Narr., 315, 1830 (Ottawa name).
- Potiwattomies – Ibid.
- Potowatameh – Du Ponceau in Mass. Hist. Soc. Coll., 2d S., IX, XV, 1822.
- Potowatamies – Croghan (1765) in N. Y. Doc. Col. Hist., VII, 784, 1856.
- Potowatomies – Trader (1778) quoted by Schoolcraft, Ind.Tribes, III, 561, 1853.
- Potowotamies – Gallatin in Trans. Am. Antiq. Soc., II, 121, 1836.
- Pottawatameh – Barton, New Views, xxxiiii, 1797.
- Pottawatamie – 1821 Treaty of Chicago in U. S. Ind. Treat., 152, 1873.
- Pottawataneys – Hopkins (1766) in N. Y. Doc. Col. Hist., VII, 993, 1856.
- Pottawatimies – Treaty (1806) in U S. Ind. Treat., 371, 1873.
- Pottawatomies – De Smet, Letters, 26, 1843..
- Pottawattamies – Brown, W. Gaz., 348, 1817.
- Potta-wat-um-ies – Warren (1852) in Minn. Hist. Soc. Coll., V, 81, 1885.
- Pottawaudumies – Ibid., 218.
- Pottawotamies – Shea, Cath. Miss., 397, 1855.
- Pottawottomies – Brownstown treaty (1809) in U. S. Ind. Treat., 194, 1873.
- Pottewatemies – Hildreth, Pioneer Hist., 75, 1848.
- Pottiwattamies – Harris, Tour, 195, 1805.
- Pottowatamies – Rupp, W. Penn., 345, 1846.
- Pottowatomy – Smith (1799) quoted by Drake, Trag. Wild., 221, 1841.
- Pottowattomies – Flint, Ind. Wars, 89, 1833.
- Pottowautomie – Council Bluffs treaty (1846) in U. S. Ind. Treat., 182, 1873.
- Pottowotomees – Treaty (1836), ibid., 150, 1873.
- Poulteattemis – Prise de Possession (1671) in Margry, Déc., I, 97, 1875.
- Poulx teattemis – Prise de Possession (1671) in N. Y,. Doc. Col. Hist., IX, 803,1855.
- Poutauatemis – Vaudreuil (1712) in N. Y. Doc. Col. Hist., IX, 863, 1855.
- Poutawatamies – Johnson (1772), ibid., VIII, 292, 1857.
- Poutawottamies – Imlay, W. Ter., 372, 1793.
- Pouteȣatamis – Doc. of 1695, ibid., 619.
- Poüteaoüatami – Allouez (1677) quoted by Shea, Discov. Miss. Val., 71, 1852.
- Pouteatami – Jesuit Relations: 1642, 97, 1858.
- Pouteatimies – Lamberville (1682) in N.Y. Doc. Col. Hist., IX, 192, 1855.
- Pouteauatamis – Doc. of 1748, ibid., X, 150, 1858.
- Pouteotamis – Harris, Voy. and Trav., II, 919, 1705.
- Pouteoüatami – Jesuit Relations: for 1667, 18, 1858.
- Pouteouatamiouec – Jesuit Relations: for 1667, 18, 1858.
- Pouteouatamis – La Chauvignerie (1736) in N. Y. Doc. Col. Hist., IX, 1058, 1855.
- Pouteouatimi – Doc. of 1748, ibid., X, 171, 1858.
- Pouteouetamites – Gallinèe (1661) in Margry, Déc., I, 144,1875.
- Pouteouitamis – La Galissonière (1748) in N. Y. Doc. Col. Hist., X, 182, 1858.
- Pouteouotamis – Coxe, Carolana, 19, 1741.
- Poutewatamies – Doc. of 1746 in N. Y. Doc. Col. Hist., X, 34, 1858.
- Poutoualamis – Tonti, Rel. De la Le., 100, 1720.
- Poutoüamis – Writer of 1756 in N.Y. Doc. Col. Hist., X, 401, 1858.
- Poutouatamis – Du Chesneau (1681) IX, 161, 1855.
- Poutouatamittes – Gallinèe (1669) in Margry, Déc., I, 142, 1875.
- Poutouotamis – Coxe, Carolana, map, 1741.
- Poutouwatamis – Le Sueur (1700) quoted by Neill, Minn., 156, 1858.
- Poutowatomies – Pike, Trav., 18, note, 1811.
- Poutuatamis – Le Sueur (1700) quoted by Shea, Early Voy., 94, 1861.
- Poutwatamis – Duquesne (1754) in N. Y. Doc. Col. Hist., X, 263, 1858.
- Pouutouatami – Jesuit Relations: 1640, 35, 1858.
- Powtawatamis – Trader of 1766 quoted by Schoolcraft, Ind. Tribes, III, 556, 1856.
- Powtewatamis – Jefferys, Fr. Doms., pt. 1, 144, 1761.
- Powtewattimies – Council of 1786 in Am. St. Papers, Ind. Aff., I, 8, 1832.
- Powtowottamies – Carver, Trav., 349, 1778.
- Puotwatemi – York (1700) in N. Y. Doc. Col. Hist., IV, 749, 1854.
- Putavatimes – Croghan (1759) quoted by Rupp, W. Penn., app., 138, 1846.
- Putawatame – Ft Wayne treaty (1810) in U. S. Ind. Tread., 374, 1873.
- Putawatimes – Croghan (1759) quoted by Proud, Penn., II, 296, 1798.
- Putawatimies – Treaty of 1806 in U. S. Ind. Treat., 373, 1873.
- Putawatimis – Treaty of 1806 in U. S. Ind. Treat., 373, 1873.
- Putawatomie – Brown, W. Gaz., 45, 1817.
- Putawawtawmaws – Dalton (1783) in Mass. Hist. Soc. Coll., 1st S., X, 123, 1809.
- Pú-te-wa-ta – Riggs, Dak. Gram. and Dict., 184, 1852 (Sioux form).
- Pú-te-wa-ta-dan – Ibid. (Santee form).
- Putewatimes – Croghan (1759) quoted by Rupp, W. Penn., app., 132, 1846.
- Putowatomey's – Croghan (1760) in Mass. Hist. Soc. Coll., 4th s., IX, 289, 1871.
- Puttawattimies – Grouseland treaty (1803) in U. S. Ind. Treat., 370, 1873.
- Puttcotungs – Beatty, Jour., 63, 1798 (misprint).
- Puttewatamies – Croghan (1765) in N.Y. Doc. Col. Hist., VII, 781, 1856.
- Puttowatamies – Bouquet (1760) in Mass. Hist. Soc. Coll., 4th S., IX, 295, 1871:
- Puttwatimees – Croghan (1760), ibid., 262.

== Exonyms ==
=== Fire Nation ===
This is a loose translation of Bodéwadmi.

- Fire Nation – Schoolcraft, ibid., 206.
- Gens de Feu – Champlain (1616) Oeuvres, IV, 58, 1870; Sagard, Grande Voyage, I, 53, 1865.
- Gens feu – Sagard, Hist. Can., I, 194, 1836 (misprint).
- Nation du Feu – Jesuit Relations: 1641, 72, 1858.
- Nation of Fire – Jefferys, French Doms., pt. I, 48, 1761.

=== Lice Nation ===
This is a shortening of Bodéwadmi, which happens to be a homophone to the French word for "lice" (poux).

- Poes – Long, Voy. and Trav., 144. 1791.
- Pō-tŏsh – Dunn, True Indian Stories, 299, 1908 (Miami nickname).
- Pouës – Cadillac (1695) in Margry, Déc., V, 120, 1883 (abbreviated form used by French).
- Poulx – Montreal conf. (1756) in N. Y. Doc. Col. Hist., X, 447, 1858.
- Pous – Dunn, True Ind. Stories, 299, 1908 ('lice': French name, of accidental meaning; see Poux, Pouz).
- Poux – Frontenac (1682) in N. Y. Doc. Col. Hist., IX, 182, 1855.
- Pouz – Doc. Of 1748, ibid., X, 142, 1858.

=== Hybridized name ===
These name come from hybridization of Bodéwadmi with the French poux.

- Poueatamis – Boisherbert (1747) in N. Y. Doc. Col. Hist., X, 84, 1858.
- Pouhatamies – Boudinot, Star in the West, 128, 1816.
- Poutéamis – Lamberville (1682) in N. Y. Doc. Col. Hist., IX, 798, 1855.

=== Iroquoian names ===
- Adawadenys – Canajoharie conf. (1759) in N. Y. Doc. Col. Hist. VII, 884, 1856 (probably an Iroquois corruption).
- Asistagueronon – Champlain (1616), Œuvres, V, pt. 1, 275, 1870.
- Asistagueroüon – Ibid. (1616), IV, 58, 1870.
- Assestagueronons – Schoolcraft. Ind. Tribes, IV, 206, 1854.
- Assistaeronons – Jesuit Relations: 1670–71, as quoted by Schoolcraft, ibid., 244.
- Assistagueronon – Sagard (1636), Hist. Can., I, 194,1864; Champlain (1632), Oeuvres, V, map, 1870.
- Assistaqueronons – Champlain, (ca. 1630), as quoted by Schoolcraft, Ind. Tribes, IV, 244, 1854.
- Athistaëronnon – Jesuit Relations: 1646, 77, 1858.
- Atowateany – Post (1758) quoted by Proud, Penn., II, app., 113, 1798.
- Atsistaehronons – Jesuit Relations: 1641, 72, 1858.
- Atsistahereoron – Champlain, Œuvres, IV, 58, note, 1870.
- Atsistarhonon – Sagard (1632), Hist. Can., Huron Dict., 1866 (Huron name).
- Attisitaehronon – Jesuit Relations: 1640, 35, 1858.
- Attistae – Schoolcraft, Ind. Tribes, IV, 244, 1854 (misquoted from Jesuit Relations: 1640, 35, 1855).
- Attistaeronons – Jesuit Relations: 1640 quoted by Schoolcraft, Ind. Tribes, IV, 244, 1854.
- Ndatonȣatendi – Potier, Racines Huron, MS., 1751 (Huron name); in Swanton
- Ndatonsatendi (?) – Potier, Racines Huron, MS., 1751 (Huron name); in Hodge
- Ondatouataudy – Jesuit Relations: 1648, 62, 1858.
- Undatomátendi – Gatschet, Wyandot MS., B. A. E., 1881 (Wyandot name).

=== Other names ===
- Kúnu-hayánu – Gatschet, Caddo MS., B. A. E., 1884 ('watermelon people,' from kúnu, 'watermelon': Caddo name).
- Kúnu-háyanu, Caddo name, meaning "watermelon people"; in Swanton
- Peki /neni – Gatschet, Fox MS. vocab., B. A. E., 1882 (Fox name; plural Pekineni´/hak, 'grouse people,' from peki, 'grouse').
- Tcåshtålálgi – Creek name, meaning "watermelon people"; in Swanton
- Tchĕshtalálgi – Gatschet, Koassati MS., B. A. E.,1885 ('watermelon people,' from Creek tchĕstali, 'watermelons': Koassati name adopted from the Creeks).
- Wa^{3}-h`o^{1}-na^{2}-ha^{2} – Long, Exped. St Peter's R., I, 92, 1824 ('fire-makers': Miami name).
- Wah-hō'-na-hah – Dunn, True Ind. Stories 299, 1908 (Miami name)., supposedly meaning "fire makers."
- Wáhiú¢axá – Omaha name, in Swanton.
- Wáhiú¢aqá – Dorsey in Cont. N. A. Ethnol., VI, pt. 2, 664; 1890 (Omaha name).
- Wáhiúyaha – Dorsey, Kansas MS.vocab., B.A. E., 1882 (Kansa name).
- Wapoos – La Salle (1680) quoted by Parkman, La Salle, 180, 1883 (identical?).
- Wo-rá-qĕ – St Cyr, inf'n, 1886 (Winnebago name).
- Woraqa – Dorsey, Tciwere MS., vocab., B. A. E., 1879 (Iowa, Oto, and Missouri name).
- Woraxa – Iowa, Oto, and Missouri name, in Swanton.
- Woráxe – Winnebago name, in Swanton

== See also ==
- Algonquin ethnonyms
- Nipissing ethnonyms
- Ojibwa ethnonyms
