= List of Algonquin ethnonyms =

This is a list of various names the Algonquins have been recorded.

== Endonyms ==
=== Abitibiwinni(k) ===
Namesake of the Abitibi-Témiscamingue region of Québec, the Abitibiwinni First Nation mostly centred on Pikogan use "Abitibiwinni(k)" in reference to their being situated around Lake Abitibi. Abitibi means "halfway across the water," combined with inini meaning "man."

- Abitibiwinni(k). — Abitibiwinni First Nation

=== Anishinaabe(g) ===
The most general name for the Algonquins is Anishinaabe. Though several definitions are given for this name, the most common one is "spontaneous men", referring to their creation as being ex nihlo, thus being the "Original men." When syncoped, the name appears as "Nishnaabe".

- Anicinàpe(k). — Algonquin roman orthography.
- Anishinaabe(g). — Fiero "double vowel" roman orthography.

=== Odishkwaagamii(g) ===
Among the Anishinaabe peoples, the Nipissings and the Algonquins are collectively called Odishkwaagamii(g) (syncoped as Dishkwaagmii(g)), meaning "[those] at the end of the lakewater," but Jean Cuoq translates the name as "[those] at the last water," from ishkwaa ("end") and gami ("lakewater"). Chamberlain prefers "[people] on the otherside of the lake" though Chamberlin's translation would be for the Odagaamii(g) — the Meskwaki. Among the Nipissings, though, they call themselves Odishkwaagamii(g) and call the Algonquins Omaamiwinini(wag) — the "downstream man (men)".

- Odishkwaagamii(g). — Fiero "double vowel" roman orthography.
- Otickwàgamì(k). — Algonquin roman orthography.

=== Omaamiwinini(wag) ===
Omaamiwinini(wag) — the "downstream man (men)" — is a name generally used by the Nipissings and some Algonquins to describe themselves.

- Omàmiwinini(wak). — Algonquin roman orthography.
- Omaamiwinini(wag). — Fiero "double vowel" roman orthography.

== Exonyms ==
=== Algonquin(s) ===
The term "Algonquin" has been suggested to derive from the Maliseet word elakómkwik (pronounced [ɛlæˈɡomoɡwik]), "they are our relatives/allies".

- Alagonkins. — Croghan (1765) in Monthly American Journal of Geology, 272, 1831.
- Algokin. — McKenzie quoted by Tanner, Narratives, 332, 1830.
- Algomeequin. — Schoolcraft, Indian Tribes, I, 306, 1851.
- Algomequins. — Schoolcraft, Indian Tribes, V, 38, 1855
- Algommequin. — Champlain (1632), Œuvres, V, pt. 2, 193, 1870.
- Algomquins. — Sagard (1636), Canada, I, 247, 1866.
- Algoncains. — Hennepin, New Discoveries, 95, 1698.
- Algongins. — Tracy (1667) in New York Documents of Colonial History, III, 153, 1853.
- Algonquin. — Morse, North America, 238, 1778.
- Algonic Indians. — Schoolcraft, Indian Tribes, I, 38, 1851.
- Algonkins. — Hennepin (1683) in Harris, Voyage and Travel, II, 916, 1705.
- Algonméquin. — Martin in Bressani, Relations Abrégée, 319, 1653.
- Algonovins. — Alcedo, Dictionary of Geography, V, 120, 1789.
- Algonquians. — Jesuit Relations: 1653, 3, 1858.
- Algonquens. — Schoolcraft, Indian Tribes, II, 358, 1852.
- Algonquin. — Jesuit Relations: 1632, 14, 1858.
- Algoomenquini. — Keane in Stanford, Compendium, 500, 1878.
- Algoquins. — Lewis and Clark, Travels, I, map, 1817.
- Algoquois. — Audouard, Far West, 207, 1869.
- Algouinquins. — Gorges (1658) in Maine Historical Society Collections, II, 67, 1847.
- Algoumekins. — Gallatin in Transactions and Collections of the American Antiquarian Society, II, 24, 1836.
- Algoumequini. — De Laet (1633) quoted by Vater, Mithridates, pt. 3, sec. 3, 404, 1816.
- Algoumequins. — Champlain (1603), Œuvres, II, 8, 1870.
- Algumenquini. — Kingsley, Standard National History, pt. 6, 147, 1883.
- Alinconguins. — Nicolls (1666) in New York Documents of Colonial History, II, 147, 1853.
- Alkonkins. — Hutchins (1778) quoted by Jefferson, Notes, 141, 1825.
- Alquequin. — Lloyd in Journal of Anthropological Institute of Great Britain, IV, 44, 1875.
- Altenkins. — Clinton (1745) in New York Documents of Colonial History, VI, 281, 1855 (misprint).
- Attenkins. — Clinton (1745) in New York Documents of Colonial History, VI, 276, 1855.

=== Akwanake ===
The general name for any unspecified non-Iroquoian groups, including the Algonquins, were called "Akwanake"—"Strangers"—by the Iroquoian peoples.

- Akwanake. — Brebœuf quoted by Schoolcraft, Indian Tribes, IV, 207, 1854.

=== Other ===
- Abnaki. — A variation of Waabanakii(g) — Easterner(s).

== See also ==
- Nipissing ethnonyms
- Ojibwa ethnonyms
- Potawatomi ethnonyms
