= List of Ojibwa ethnonyms =

This is a list of various names the Ojibwa have been recorded. They can be divided based on who coined the names. The first type are names created by the Ojibwa people to refer to themselves, known as endonyms or autonyms. The second type are names coined by non-Ojibwa people and are known as exonyms or xenonyms.

== Endonyms ==
=== Anishinaabe(g) ===
The most general name for the Ojibwa is Anishinaabe. Though several definitions are given for this name, the most common one is "spontaneous men", referring to their creation as being ex nihilo, thus being the "Original men." When syncoped, the name appears as "Nishnaabe":

- An-ish-in-aub-ag. — Warren in Minnesota Historical Society Collections, V, 45, 1885.
- A-wish-in-aub-ay. — Warren in Minnesota Historical Society Collections, V, 37, 1885.

In more recent spelling includes:

- Ahnishinahbæó^{t}jibway (used by Wub-e-ke-niew (Waabiginiw)/Francis Blake, Jr. for Anishinaabe-Ojibwe)
- Anishinabek (as in: Anishinabek Nation)
- Anishinaubae (as in: Basil Johnston's Anishninaubae Thesaurus (2007), ISBN 978-0-87013-753-2)
- Anishnabai (as in: Teme-Augama Anishnabai)
- Nishnawbe (as in: Nishnawbe Aski Nation)

=== Inini(wag) ===
The general term for many Ojibwa is to refer to themselves as an Inini ("man"), opposed to some other life forms:

- Ninniwas. — Rafinesque, Am. Nations, I, 123, 1836.

=== Ojibwe(g) ===
Several different explanations are given for the common name Ojibwe.

- from ojiibwabwe (/o/ + /jiibw/ + /abwe/), meaning "those who cook\roast until it puckers", referring to their fire-curing of moccasin seams to make them waterproof, though some sources instead say this was a method of torture the Ojibwe implemented upon their enemies.
- from ozhibii'iwe (/o/ + /zhibii'/ + /iwe/), meaning "those who keep records [of a Vision]", referring to their form of pictorial writing, and pictographs used in Midewiwin rites
- from ojiibwe (/o/ + /jiib/ + /we/), meaning "those who speak-stiffly"\"those who stammer", referring to how the Ojibwe sounded to the Cree

Today, it finds its way in English as "Ojibwa(y)" or "Chippewa", but have had many different recorded variations in the past:

- Achipoés. — Prise de Possession (1671) in Perrot, Mém., 293,1864.
- Achipoué. — warn in Minnesota Historical Society Collections, V, 398, 1885
- Anchipawah. — Boudinot, Star in the West, 126, 1816.
- Chebois. — Gass, Jour., 47, note, 1807.
- Chepawas. — Croghan (1759) quoted by Kauffman, West. Penn., 132, app., 1851.
- Chepeways. — Croghan (1760) in Massachusetts Historical Society Collections, 4th s., IX, 287,1871.
- Chepowas. — Croghan (1759) quoted by Proud, Penn., II, 296, 1798.
- Cheppewes. — Shirley (1755) in New York Documents of Colonial History, VI, 1027,1855.
- Chiappawaws. — Loudon, Coll. Int. Nar., I, 34, 1808.
- Chibois. — Bouquet (1760) in Massachusetts Historical Society Collections, 4th session, IX, 295, 1871.
- Chipawawas. — Goldthwait (1766) in Massachusetts Historical Society Collections, 1st session, X, 122, 1809.
- Chipaways. — Croghan (1760), Massachusetts Historical Society Collections, 4th session, IX, 250,1871.
- Chipaweighs. — German Flats conf. (1770) in New York Documents of Colonial History, VIII, 229, 1857.
- Chipewas. — Lattré, map U.S., 1784.
- Chipéways. — Carver (1766) Trav., 19, 1778.
- Chipeweghs. — Johnson (1763) in New York Documents of Colonial History, VII, 526, 1856.
- Chipeweighs. — Johnson (1763), New York Documents of Colonial History, 583, 1856.
- Chipiwa. — Treaty of 1820, U. S. Ind. Treat., 369,1873.
- Chipoës. — Prise de Possession (1671) in New York Documents of Colonial History, IX, 803, 1855.
- Chippawas. — Croghan (1759) quoted by Jefferson, Notes, 143, 1825.
- Chipawees. — Writer of 1756 Massachusetts Historical Society Collections 1st Session, VII, 123, 1801.
- Chippeouays. — Toussaint, map of America, 1839.
- Chippewaes. — Johnson (1763) in New York Documents of Colonial History, VII, 525, 1856.
- Chippewais. — Perrot (ca. 1721) in Minnesota Historical Society Collections II, pt. 2, 24, 1864.
- Chippewas. — Washington (1754) quoted by Kauffman, West. Penn., 67, 1851.
- Chippewaus. — Edwards (1788) in Massachusetts Historical Society Collections, 1st Session, IX, 92, 1804.
- Chippeways. — La Chauvignerie (1736) quoted by Schoolcraft, Indian Tribes, III, 556, 1858.
- Chippeweighs. — Johnson (1767) in New York Documents of Colonial History, VII, 969, 1856.
- Chippewyse. — Ft Johnson conf. (1755), New York Documents of Colonial History, VI, 975, 1855.
- Chippoways. — Washington (1754) in Massachusetts Historical Society Collections, 1st S., VI, 140, 1800.
- Chippuwas. — Heckewelder quoted by Barton, New Views, app. 1, 1798.
- Chipwaes. — Croghan (1765) in New York Documents of Colonial History, VII, 782, 1856.
- Chipwas — Bouquet (1760) in Massachusetts Historical Society Collections, 4th Session, IX, 321, 1871.
- Chipways. — Croghan (1765), in New York Documents of Colonial History, VII, 782, 1856.
- Cypoways. — Beltrami quoted by Neill, Minnesota, 350, 1858.
- Dshipowē-hága. — Gatschet, Caughnawaga Manuscript, Bureau of American Ethnology, 1882 (Caughnawaga name).
- Etchipoës. — Prise de possession (1671), New York Documents of Colonial History, IX, 808, 1855.
- Gibbaways. — Imlay, West Ter., 363, 1797.
- Icbewas. — Boudinot, Star in the West, 126, 1816 (misprint).
- Jibewas. — Smith (1799) quoted by Drake, Trag. Wild., 213, 1841.
- Objibways. — Kingsley, Stand. Nat. Hist., pt. 6, 143, 1883.
- O^{1}′-che^{1}pe^{2}′wa^{1}g. — Long, Exped. St. Peter’s River, II, 151, 1824.
- Ochipawa. — Umfreville (1790) in Maine Historical Society Collections, VI, 270, 1859.
- Ochipewa. — Richardson, Arct. Exped., 71, 1851.
- Ochipoy. — York (1700) in New York Documents of Colonial History, IV, 749,1854.
- Ochippewais. — Foster in Sen. Misc. Doc. 39, 42d Cong., 3d Session, 6, 1873.
- Odchipewa. — Hutchins (1770) quoted by Richardson, Arct. Exped., II, 38, 1851.
- Odgjiboweke. — Perrot. Mém.193.1864.
- Odjibewais. — Ibid.
- Od-jib-wäg. — Schoolcraft quoted in Minnesota Historical Society Collections, V, 35, 1885.
- Odjibwas. — Schoolcraft, Indian Tribes, I, 307, 1851.
- Odjibwe. — Kelton, Ft Mackinac, 153, 1884.
- Odjibwek. — Belcourt (1850?) in Minnesota Historical Society Collections, I, 227, 1872.
- Ogibois. — M'Lean, Hudson Bay, II, 323, 1849.
- O-je-bway. — Jones, Ojebway Indians, 164, 1861.
- Ojeebois. — Henry, Manuscript Vocabulary (Bell copy, Bureau of American Ethnology), 1812.
- Ojibaway. — Lewis and Clark, Trav. 53, 1806.
- Ojibbewaig. — Tanner, Narr., 315, 1830 (Ottawa name).
- Ojibbeways. — Tanner, Narr., 36, 1830.
- Ojibboai. — Hoffman, Winter in the Far West, II, 15, 1821.
- Ojibeways. — Perkins and Peck, Annals of the West, 1850.
- Ojibois. — Gunn in Smithson. Rep., 400, 1868.
- Ojibua. —Maximilian, Trav., 135, note, 1843.
- O-jib-wage. — Morgan, Systems of Consanguinity and Affinity of the Human Family, 287, 1871.
- Ojibwaig. — Hale, Ethnog. and Philol. Mo. Val., 224, 1846.
- Ojibwas. — Indian Affairs Report, 454, 1838.
- O-jib-wa-uk′. — Morgan, Systems of Consanguinity and Affinity of the Human Family, 287, 1871.
- Ojibways. — American Pioneer, II, 190, 1843.
- Ojibway-ugs. — Foster in Sen. Misc. Doc. 39, 42d Congress, 3d session, 6, 1873.
- Ojibwe. — Burton, City of the Saints, 117, 1861.
- Oshibwek. — Belcourt (1850?) in Minnesota Historical Society Collections, I, 227, 1872.
- Otchepóse. — "Procès verbal" (1682) in French, Historical Collections of Louisiana, II, 19, 1875.
- Otchipoeses. — La Salle (1682) in Margry, Déc., II, 187, 1877.
- Otchipois. — La Salle (1682) in French, Hist. Coll. La., I, 46, 1846.
- Otchipoises. — Hildreth, Pioneer History, 9, 1848.
- Otchipwe. — Baraga, Otchipwe Grammar, title, 1878.
- Otjibwek. — Perrot, Mém., 193, 1864.
- Ottapoas. — Buchanan, North American Indians, 156, 1824.
- Oucahipues. — La Hontan (1703), New Voyage, II, 87, 1735.
- Ouchibois. — Writer of 1761 in Massachusetts Historical Society Collections, 4th Session, IX, 428, 1871.
- Ouchipawah. — Pike (1806) quoted by Schoolcraft, Indian Tribes, III, 563, 1853.
- Ouchipöe. — La Chesnaye (1697) in Margry, Déc., VI, 6, 1886.
- Ouchipoves. — Coxe, Carolana, map, 1741.
- Outachepas. — McKenney and Hall, Indian Tribes, III, 79, 1854.
- Outchibouec. — Jesuit Relations: 1667, 24, 1858.
- Outchibous. — Jesuit Relations: 1670, 79, 1858.
- Outchipoue. — Gallinèe (1669) in Margry, Déc. I, 163, 1875.
- Outchipwais. — Bell in Can. Med. and Surg. Jour., Mar. and Apr., 1886.
- Outehipoues. — La Hontan, New Voyage, I, 230, 1703.
- Schipuwe. — Heckewelder quoted by Barton, New Views, app., 1, 1798 (German form).
- Shepawees. — Lindesay (1749) in New York Documents of Colonial History, VI, 538, 1855.
- Shepewas. — Bradstreet (ca. 1765), New York Documents of Colonial History, VII, 694, 1856.
- Shepuway. — Heckewelder quoted by Barton, New Views, app., 1, 1798.
- Tcipu′. — Dorsey, Kansas Manuscript Vocabulary, B.A.E., 1882 (Kansa name).
- Tschipeway. — Wrangell, Ethnol. Nachr., 100, 1839.
- Tschippiweer. — Walch, map, 1805 (German form).
- Tsipu′. — Dorsey, Osage Manuscript Vocabulary, Bureau of American Ethnology, 1883 (Osage name).
- Uchipweys. — Dalton (1783) in Massachusetts Historical Society Collections, 1st Session, X, 123, 1809.

=== Baawitigong ===
Due to the long association of the Ojibwa with the Sault Ste. Marie region, and more specifically with the Rapids of the St. Mary's River, the common name for the Ojibwa became Baawitigong, meaning "those at the rapids":

- Baouichtigouin. — Jesuit Relations: 1640, 34, 1858.
- Bawichtigouek. — Jesuit Relations: 1640, index, 1858.
- Bawichtigouin. — Jesuit Relations: 1640, index, 1858.
- Paouichtigouin. — Jesuit Relations, III, index, 1858.
- Paouitagoung. — Jesuit Relations, III, index, 1858.
- Paouitigoueieuhak [Baawitigweyaa(wag) (White-waters)]. — Jesuit Relations, III, index, 1858.
- Paouitingouach-irini [Baawitigwajiw-inini(wag) ("Rapids-Mount Man")]. — Jesuit Relations, III, index, 1858.

=== Nii’inawe(g) ===
The term Nii'inawe means "[those who speak] our nation's language" and is a generic term used by the Algonquian peoples to refer to fellow Algonquian peoples.

- Né-a-ya-og′. — Hayden, Ethnog. and Philol. Mo. Val. 235, 1862 (Cree name).

=== Bangii(yaad) ===
The term Bangii means "a little bit", often used to refer to the Métis:

- Bungees. — Henry, Manuscript Vocabulary (Bell copy, Bureau of American Ethnology), 1812 (so called by Hudson Bay traders).

== Exonyms ==
=== Wendat names ===
The general Wendat name for the Ojibwa is "Ehstihaĝeron(on)," which is a translation of "Baawitigong":

- A_{x}shissayé-rúnu. — Gatschet. Wyandot MS., B.A.E., 1881 (Wyandot name).
- Eskiaeronnon. — Jesuit Relations 1649, 27, 1858 (Huron name; Hewitt. says it signifies 'people of the falls').
- Estiaghes. — Albany conf. (1726) in New York Documents of Colonial History, V, 791, 1855.
- Estiaghicks. Colden (1727), New York Documents of Colonial History, IV, 737, note, 1854.
- Estjage. — Livingston (1701), New York Documents of Colonial History, 899, 1854.
- Ontehibouse. — Raymbaut (1641) quoted in Indian Affairs Report 1849, 70, 1850 (probably a misprint).
- Ostiagaghroones. — Canajoharie conf. (1759) in New York Documents of Colonial History, VII, 384, 1856.
- Ostiagahoroones. — Neill in Minnesota Historical Society Collections, V, 397, 1885 (Iroquois name).
- Stiaggeghroano. — Post (1758) quoted by Proud, Penn., II, app., 113, 1798.
- Stiagigroone. — Livingston (1700) in N. Y. Doc. Col. Hist., IV, 737, 1854.

=== French names ===
The general French name for the Ojibwa is "Saulteur(s)", a translation of "Baawitigong". In early French North America, the term "sault" referred to a type of rapids in which the waters appeared to tumble or roll:

- Jumpers. — Neill, Minnesota, 36, 1858 (incorrect translation of Saulteurs into English).
- Leapers. — Hennepin, New Discov., 86, 1698 (incorrect rendering of Saulteurs into English).
- Nation du Sault. — Jogues and Raymbaut in Jesuit Relations 1642, II, 95,1858.
- Salteur. — Bacqueville de la Potherie, II, 48, 1753.
- Santeaux. — Brown, Western Gazette, 265, 1817 (misprint).
- Santena. — Gunn in Smithsonian Report 1867, 400, 1868 (misprint).
- Santeurs. — Dobbs, Hudson Bay, 26, 1744 (misprint).
- Saulteaux. — Beauharnois (1745) in Minnesota Historical Society Collections, V, 432, 1885.
- Saulteurs. — Jesuit Relations 1670, 79, 1858.
- Saulteuse. — Belcourt (ca. 1850) in Minnesota Historical Society Collections, I, 228, 1872.
- Saulteux. — Gallinée (1669) in Margry, Déc., I, 163, 1875.
- Sault Indians. — Vaudreuil (1710) in New York Documents of Colonial History, IX, 843, 1855.
- Sauteaux. — Gamelin (1790) in Am. St. Papers, IV, 94, 1832.
- Sauters. — Schermerhorn (1812) in Massachusetts Historical Society Collections 2d Session, II, 6, 1814.
- Sauteurs. — Jesuit Relations 1667, 24, 1858.
- Sauteus. — Cox, Columbia River, II, 270, 1831.
- Sauteux. — Vaudreuil (1719) in New York Documents of Colonial History, IX, 893, 1855.
- Sautor. — Carver (1766), Trav., 97, 1778.
- Sautous. — King, Journ. to Arct. Ocean, I, 32, 1836.
- Sautoux. — King, Journ. to Arct. Ocean, I, 32, 1836.
- Sothuze. — Dalton (1783) in Massachusetts Historical Society Collections, 1st s., X, 123, 1890.
- Sotoes. — Cox, Columbia R., II, 270, 1831.
- Sotoos. — Franklin, Journ. Polar Sea, 96, 1824.
- Sotto. — Kane, Wanderings in North America, 438, 1859.
- Soulteaux. — Henry, Manuscript Vocabulary (Bell copy, Bureau of American Ethnology), 1812.
- Souteus. — La Chauvignerie (1736) quoted by Schoolcraft, Indian Tribes, III, 556,1853.
- Souties. — American Pioneer, II, 192,1843.

=== Dakota names ===
The general Dakota name for the Ojibwa is "Iyoħaħáŋtoŋ(waŋ)" or "those at the waterfall", which is a loose translation of "Baawitigong":

- Hāhatona. — Featherstonhaugh, Canoe Voy., I, 300, 1847.
- Ĥaĥatonwan. — Iapi Oaye, XIII, no. 2, 6, Feb., 1884 (Sioux name).
- Haĥátoŋwŋ. — Riggs, Dakota Dictionary, 72, 1852 (Sioux name).
- Ĥahatonway. — Matthews, Hidatsa Indians, 150, 1877 (Sioux name).
- Ha^{4}-ha^{4}t-to^{3}ng. — Long, Exped. Rocky Mountains, II, lxxxiv, 1823 (Hidatsa name, incorrectly rendered ‘leapers’).
- Ĥa-há-tu-a. — Matthews, Hidatsa Indians, 150, 1877 (Hidatsa name).
- Ha-ha-twawms. — Neill, Minnesota, 113, 1858.
- Hah-hah-ton-wah. — Gale, Upper Mississippi, 265, 1867.
- Hrah-hrah-twauns. — Ramsey (ca. 1852) in Minnesota Historical Society Collections, I, 501 1872.
- Khahkhahtons. — Snelling, Tales of the Northwest, 137, 1830 (Sioux name).
- Khakhatons. — Ibid., 144.
- Khakhatonwan. — Williamson, Minn. Geol. Rep. for 1884, 107.
- Qa-qán-to n-wa. — Dorsey, oral information, 1886 (Sioux name).
- Ra-ra-to-oans. — Warren (1852) in Minnesota Historical Society Collections, V, 96, 1885.
- Ra-ra-t'wans. — Ramsey in Ind. Aff. Rep. 1849, 72, 1850 (Sioux name).
- Wah-kah-towah. — Tanner, Narr., 150, 1830 (Assiniboin name).

=== Iroquoian names ===
The general Iroquoian name for the Ojibwa is "Dwăkănĕņ", recorded variously as:

- De-wă-kă-nhă'. — Hewitt, Mohawk Manuscript Vocabulary, Bureau of American Ethnology (Mohawk name).
- Dewoganna's. — Bellomont (1698) in New York Documents of Colonial History, IV, 407, 1854.
- Douaganhas. — Cortland (1687), New York Documents of Colonial History, III, 434, 1853.
- Douwaganhas. — Cortland (1687), New York Documents of Colonial History, III, 434, 1853.
- Dovaganhaes. — Livingston (1691), New York Documents of Colonial History, III, 778, 1855.
- Dowaganahs. — Doc. of 1700, New York Documents of Colonial History, IV, 701, 1854.
- Dowaganhas. — Cortland (1687), New York Documents of Colonial History, III, 434, 1855.
- Dowanganhaes. — Doc. of 1691, New York Documents of Colonial History, III, 1776, 1855.
- Dwă-kă-nĕn. — Hewitt, Onondaga Manuscript Vocabulary, B.A. E. (Onondaga name).
- Dwă-kă-nhă'. — Hewitt, Seneca and Onondaga Vocabulary, Bureau of American Ethnology, 1880 (Seneca and Onondaga name).
- Nwă '-kă. — Hewitt, Tuscarora Manuscript Vocabulary, Bureau of American Ethnology, 1880 (Tuscarora name).
- Twă -'kă′-nhă'. — Smith, Cayuga and Oneida Manuscript Vocabularies, Bureau of American Ethnology, 1884 (Cayuga and Oneida name).

=== Athapaskan names ===
- Bedzaqetcha. — Petitot, Montagnais Manuscript Vocabulary, Bureau of American Ethnology, 1869 ("long ears": Tsattine name).
- Bedzietcho. — Petitot, Hare Manuscript Vocabulary, Bureau of American Ethnology, 1869 (Kawchodinne name).

=== Other names ===
- Cabellos realzados. — Duro, Don Diego de Peñalosa, 43, 1882 (the Raised-hair tribe of Shea’s Peñalosa; Cheveux-relevés of the French).
- Cheveux-relevés. — Samuel de Champlain, 1615 (possibly a name for the Odawa).
- Kútaki. — Gatschet, Fox Manuscript, Bureau of American Ethnology, 1882 (Fox name).
- Regači. — St Cyr, oral information, 1886 (Ho-Chunk name; plural, Ne-gátc-hi-ján ).
- Sáhea'e (pl. -o'o). — Cheyenne name. Possibly the same name as an unknown tribe whom the Dakota Sioux call "Šahíya," assumed to mean Cree, to which its diminutive "Šahíyena" is the basis for the name "Cheyenne."

== See also ==
- Algonquin ethnonyms
- Nipissing ethnonyms
- Potawatomi ethnonyms
