= L'Isle-aux-Allumettes =

- Municipality
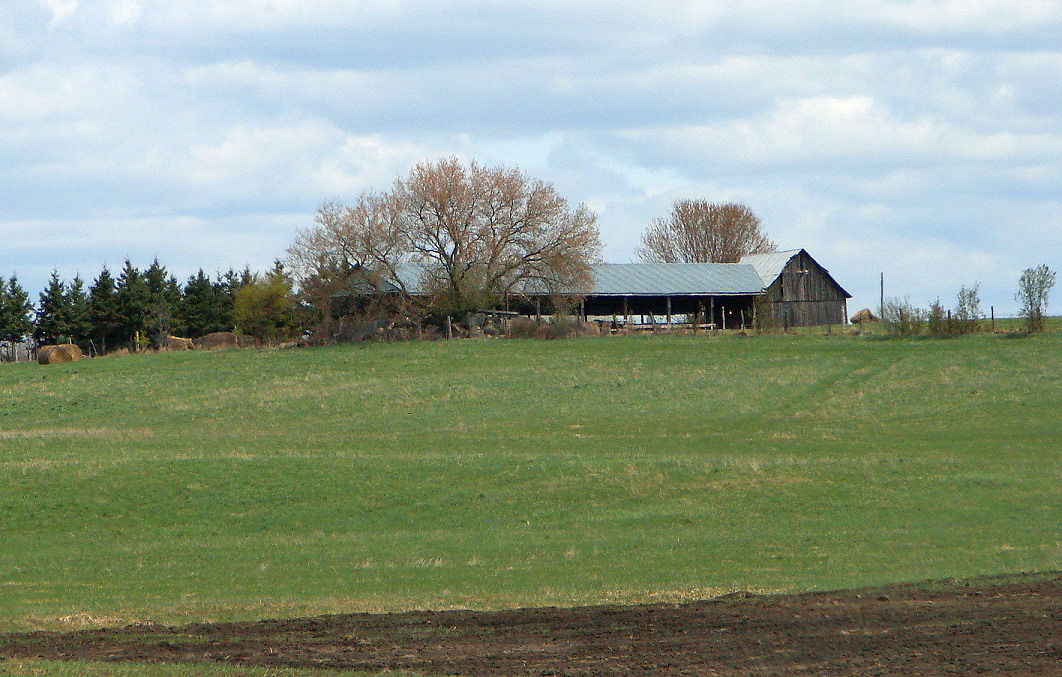

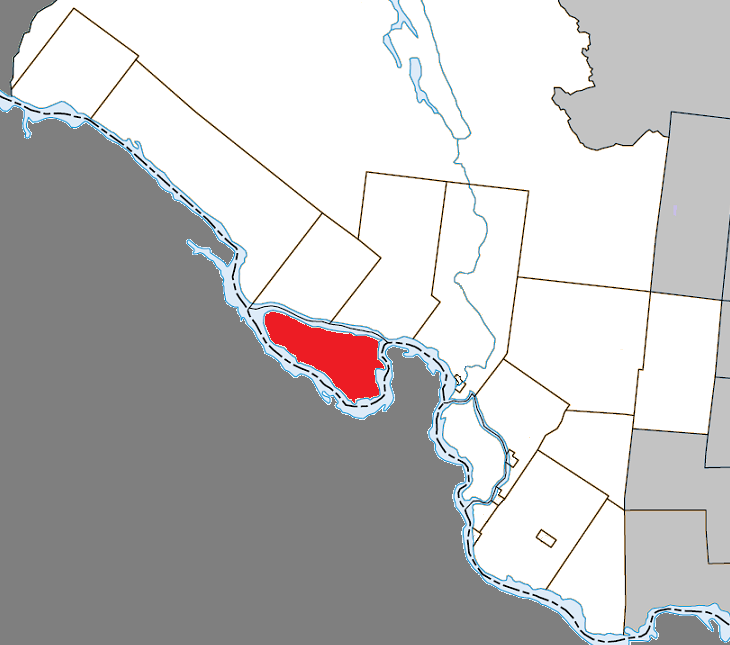
- Location within Pontiac RCM

- Location in SW Quebec
- Coordinates: 45°52′N 77°04′W
- Country: Canada
- Province: Quebec
- Region: Outaouais
- RCM: Pontiac
- Constituted: December 30, 1998

Government
  - Mayor: Corey Spence
  - Federal riding: Pontiac—Kitigan Zibi
  - Prov. riding: Pontiac

Area
  - Total: 210.60 km^{2} (81.31 sq mi)
  - Land: 185.94 km^{2} (71.79 sq mi)

Population (2021)
  - Total: 1,382
  - Density: 7.4/km^{2} (19/sq mi)
  - Pop (2016-21): ▲3.6%
  - Dwellings: 1,124
- Time zone: UTC−5 (EST)
  - Summer (DST): UTC−4 (EDT)
- Postal code(s): J0X 1M0
- Area code: 819
- Highways: R-148
- Website: www.isle-aux-allumettes.com

L'Isle-aux-Allumettes (French pronunciation: [lil oz‿alymɛt]) is a municipality in the Outaouais region, part of the Pontiac Regional County Municipality, Quebec, Canada. The municipality consists primarily of Allumette Island (in French Île aux Allumettes), and also includes Morrison Island, Marcotte Island, and some minor islets, all in the Ottawa River north of Pembroke.

In the past, the island and municipalities have been spelled in French in various ways:

- Isle-des-Allumettes
- L'Île-Allumettes
- Île-aux-Allumettes

== Etymology ==
The name Isle-aux-Allumettes literally means "Island of Matches", and may refer to a box of matches that was left behind. In 1686, Chevalier de Troyes wrote about the island: “A Jesuit passing here another time forgot a box of matches which he carried to make a fire. This is why the Voyageurs gave the name “L’Isle-aux-Allumettes”.

Another theory claims that the place was named for the reeds that grew on the island which were used as matches.

== Geography ==
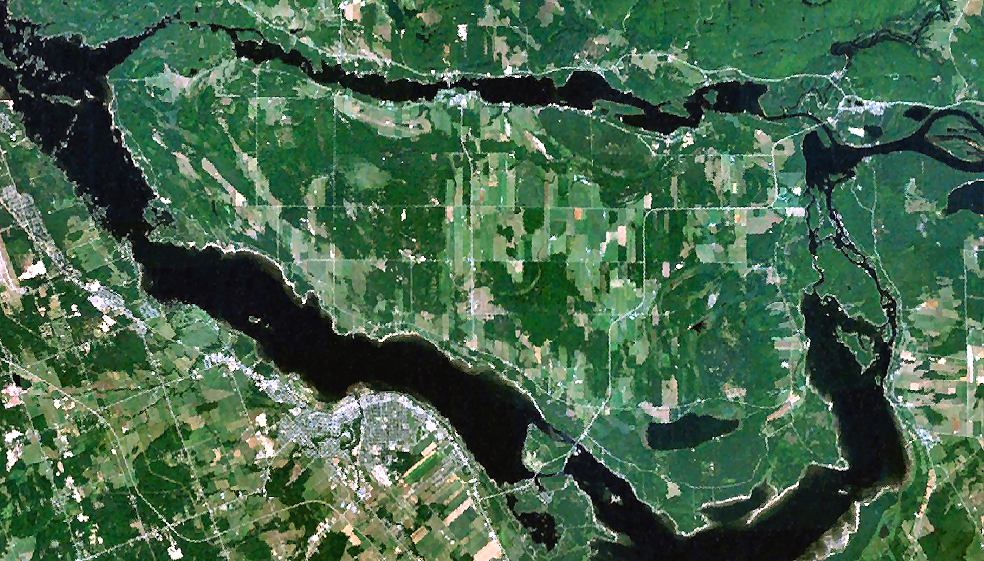
Satellite photo of the island

Allumette Island is 22 kilometres (14 mi) long and 12 kilometres (7.5 mi) wide, making it the largest island within the Ottawa River along its entire course. At this point the Ottawa River has widened into a lake, called Allumette Lake, which is 52 km (32 mi) long and has a total surface area of 120 km^{2} (46 sq mi).

The municipality consists mostly of agricultural land. Its population centres are Chapeau, Desjardinsville, Demers Centre, and Saint-Joseph.

== History ==
The Kichesipirini Algonquins first occupied the site in order to maintain control of trade on the Ottawa River. For this reason, Samuel de Champlain named it Isle des Algoumequins during his trip of 1613. In 1650, this native population was almost entirely exterminated by the Iroquois.

In his memoirs written during the second half of the 17th century, Nicolas Perrot made mention of the "One-Eyed Man's Island otherwise called Matches Island" ("Isle du Borgne autrement ditte l'Isle des Allumettes"). "One-Eyed" was a reference to the disability of Tessouat, an Algonquin chief in the region. The name "Allumettes" was first given to the rapids south-east of the island; a map from 1680 refers to these as Sault des Allumettes (Matches Falls).

It was not until 1818 that Europeans began to settle on the island. They worked mostly as loggers or for the Hudson's Bay Company which had a fur trading post just upstream at Fort William. The preferred transport route was still the river, so most families build their homes on the southside of the island where the church of Saint-Alphonse-de-l'Île-aux-Allumettes Parish was built in 1840. The Île-aux-Allumettes Township was formed in 1847, and its first mayor was Andrew Whelan.

An intense fire destroyed almost all the buildings in 1853 and, thereafter, the population settled more toward the northern part, on the current site of Chapeau village. In 1874, the village of Chapeau separated from the township and became an incorporated municipality, with Patrick Cunningham as the first mayor.

In 1910, the parish of Saint-Joseph-de-l'Île-aux-Allumettes was established on the eastern part of the island, leading to the formation of the Municipality of L'Isle-aux-Allumettes-Partie-Est in 1920.

On December 30, 1998, the municipality of Chapeau Village and the township municipalities of L'Isle-aux-Allumettes and L'Isle-aux-Allumettes-Part-East were merged into the new Municipality of L'Isle-aux-Allumettes.

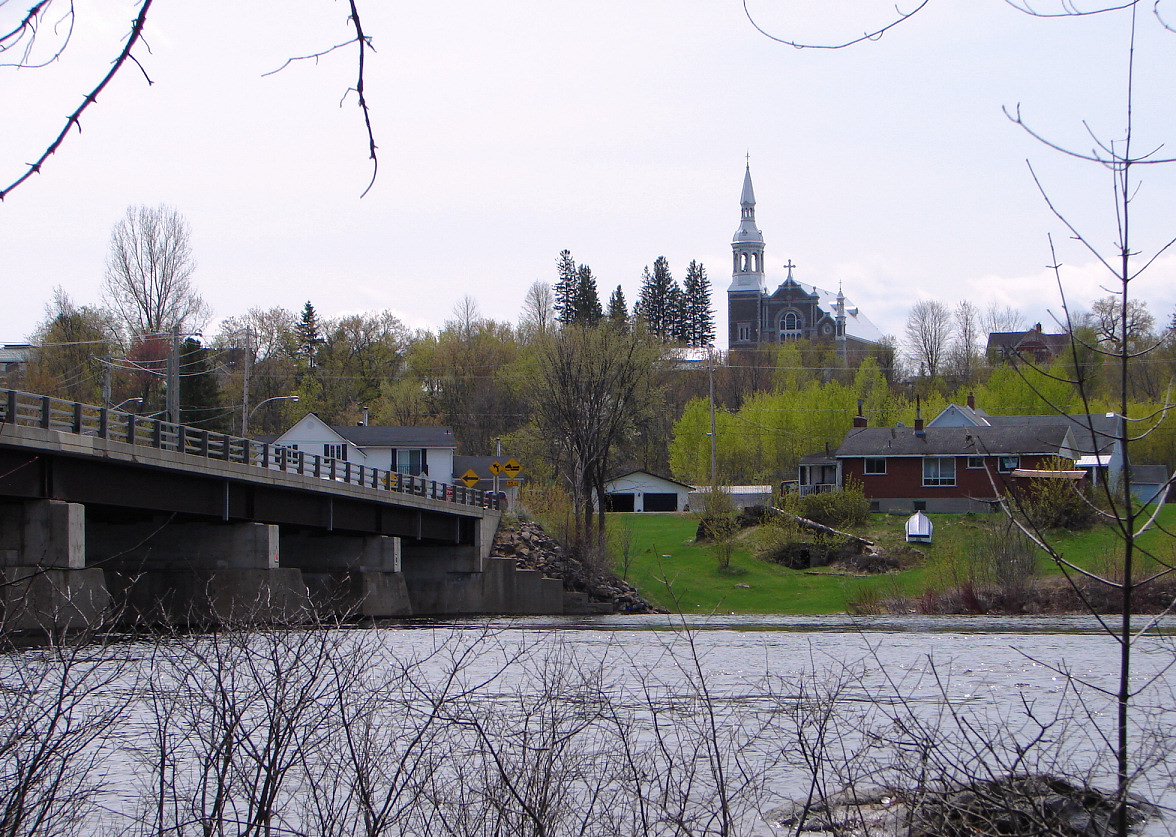
Chapeau

== Demographics ==
=== Population ===
Canada census – L'Isle-aux-Allumettes community profile

	2021	2016	2011
Population	1,382 (+3.6% from 2016)	1,334 (-0.8% from 2011)	1,345 (-6.8% from 2006)
Land area	185.94 km^{2} (71.79 sq mi)	186.02 km^{2} (71.82 sq mi)	185.87 km^{2} (71.76 sq mi)
Population density	7.4/km^{2} (19/sq mi)	7.2/km^{2} (19/sq mi)	7.2/km^{2} (19/sq mi)
Median age	50.0 (M: 48.8, F: 50.8)	50.6 (M: 49.8, F: 51.3)	47.7 (M: 47.3, F: 47.9)
Private dwellings	1,124 (total) 621 (occupied)	1,126 (total)	1,122 (total)
Median household income	$67,000	$54,400	$.N/A

Notes: 2011 Income data for this area has been suppressed for data quality or confidentiality reasons.
References: 2021 2016 2011

Historical Census Data - L'Isle-aux-Allumettes, Quebec

Year	Pop.	±%
1976	1,575	—
1981	1,499	−4.8%
1986	1,430	−4.6%
1991	1,430	+0.0%
1996	1,482	+3.6%

Year	Pop.	±%
2001	1,385	−6.5%
2006	1,443	+4.2%
2011	1,345	−6.8%
2016	1,334	−0.8%
2021	1,382	+3.6%

Population amounts prior to 1998 are total of L'Isle-aux-Allumettes CT, L'Isle-aux-Allumettes-Partie-Est CT, and Chapeau VL.
Source: Statistics Canada

=== Language ===
Mother tongue (2021):

- English as first language: 75.7%
- French as first language: 18.1%
- English and French as first language: 3.6%
- Other as first language: 2.2%

== Local government ==
List of former mayors (since formation of current municipality):

- Jérôme Sallafranque (1998–1999)
- Denzil Spence (1999–2005)
- Brian Adam (2005–2009)
- Winston Sunstrum (2009–2021)
- Corey Spence (2021–present)

== Transportation ==
The main highway on the island, Quebec Route 148, extends easterly through Gatineau to Montreal. At its western terminus in L'Isle-aux-Allumettes, the roadway crosses the Ottawa River and continues as Ontario Highway 148 into Laurentian Valley and Pembroke.

== See also ==
- List of anglophone communities in Quebec
- List of municipalities in Quebec
