= Kichesipirini =

Historical Indigenous people of Canada

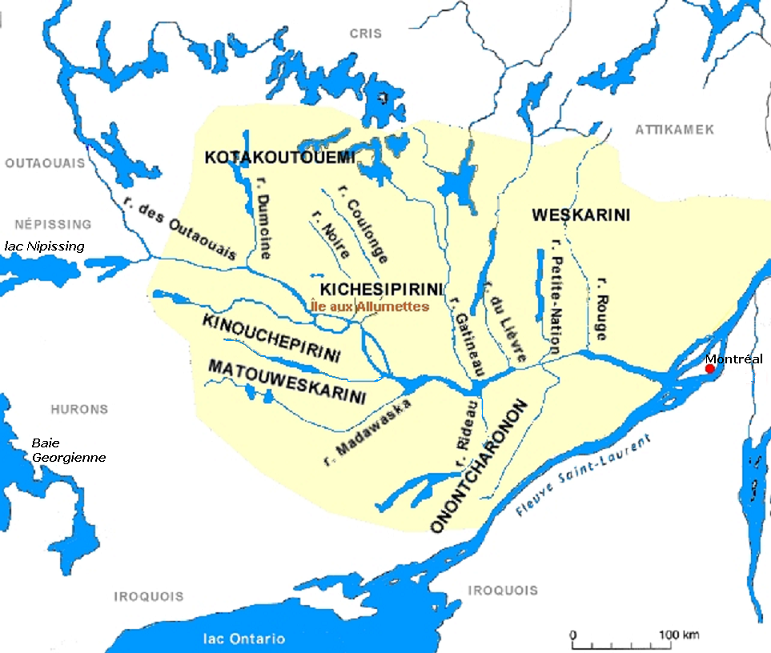
- Kichesipirini territory along the Ottawa River drainage in Quebec

Total population
- Last historical account was from the mid-17th century

Languages
- A dialect of Northern Algonquin language

Religion
- Indigenous religion

The Kichesipirini ("People of the Great River", "Island Indians") were an Algonquin First Nations in Canada based near the Ottawa River in Quebec.

== Name ==
The name Kichesipirini translates into English as "men of the great river," for their words kiche (great), sipi (river), and iriniouck (men). Huron people called them Ehonkeronon. They were also known as Algommequin de l'Isle, Héhonqueronon, Honquerons, Kitchesipiiriniouek, and Nation de l'Isle.

The Ottawa River was called Kitchissippi.

== Territory ==
They lived on L'Isle-aux-Allumettes (Allumette Island) along the Ottawa River in Quebec. Their primary village was located on Morrison Island in the Ottawa River, as well their territory was on both sides of the river in Ontario and Quebec, in the Pontiac Regional County Municipality, Quebec, located just to the east of Morrison Island.

== History ==
=== 17th century ===
They may have been the first Algonquin nation to meet French explorers in the early 17th century. Tessouat (d. 1636), their chief, met Samuel de Champlain in the summer of 1603, and Champlain visited their village again in May 1613.

Because of their position on the river, they were able to charge tolls to French traders and missionaries. Chief Tessouat, noted for having one eye, decided which non-Algonquin people could travel up or down the river.

In 1645, the Kichesipirini and the Hurons entered a peace treaty with the Haudenosaunee; however, the peace was not lasted, and by 1650 they had to flee their homelands. It is unknown where they settled, but likely they joined the Odawa people.
