= Algonquin people =

Indigenous people of Eastern Canada

Algonquins
Omàmiwininì

Regions with significant populations
- Canada (Quebec, Ontario), United States (Upper Michigan, Wisconsin)

Languages
- French, English, Algonquin

Religion
- Midewiwin

Related ethnic groups
- Anicinàpek (Nipissing, Ojibwa, Menominee, Mississaugas, Saulteaux, Odawa, Potawatomi, and Anisininew)

- Person: Anicinàpe (Omàmìwininì)
- People: Anicinàpek (Omàmiwininiwak)
- Language: Anicinàbemowin (Omàmìwininìmowin)
- Country: Omàmìwininìwaki; Anicinàpe Aki (Nitakinan)

Algonquin territory circa 1800 in green

The Algonquin people are an Indigenous people who now live in Eastern Canada and parts of the United States. They speak the Algonquin language, which is part of the Algonquian language family. Culturally and linguistically, they are closely related to the Odawa, Potawatomi, Ojibwe (including Anisininew), Mississaugas, and Nipissing, with whom they form the larger Anicinàpe (Anishinaabeg) group. Algonquins are known by many names, including Omàmiwinini (plural: Omàmiwininiwak, "downstream man/men") and Abitibiwinni (pl.: Abitibiwinnik "men [living] halfway across the water") or the more generalised name of Anicinàpe.

Though known by several names in the past, such as Algoumequin, the most common term "Algonquin" has been suggested to derive from the Maliseet word elakómkwik (IPA: [ɛlæˈɡomoɡwik]): "they are our relatives/allies." The much larger heterogeneous group of Algonquian-speaking peoples, who, according to Brian Conwell, stretch from Virginia to the Rocky Mountains and north to Hudson Bay, was named after the tribe.

Most Algonquins live in Quebec. The nine recognized status Algonquin bands in that province and one in Ontario have a combined population of about 17,002. In addition, there are additional non-status communities, some of which are controversial. Algonquins are original Indigenous People of southern Quebec and eastern Ontario in Canada.

Many Algonquins still speak the Algonquin language, called generally Anicinàpemowin or specifically Omàmiwininìmowin. The language is considered one of several divergent dialects of the Anishinaabe languages. Among younger speakers, the Algonquin language has experienced strong word borrowings from the Cree language. Traditionally, the Algonquins lived in either birch bark or wooden mìkiwàms.

Traditionally, the Algonquins were practitioners of Midewiwin (the Path of the Heart). They believed they were surrounded by many manitòk or spirits in the natural world. French missionaries converted many Algonquins to Catholicism in the 17th and 18th centuries. Today, many Algonquin practice traditional Midewiwin or a syncretic merging of Christianity and Midewiwin.

In the oral history of the Great Anishinaabeg Migration, the Algonquins say they migrated from the Atlantic coast. Together with other Anicinàpek, they arrived at the "First Stopping Place" near Montreal. While the other Anicinàpe peoples continued their journey up the St. Lawrence River, the Algonquins settled along Kitcisìpi (the Ottawa River), a long-important highway for commerce, cultural exchange and transportation. Algonquin identity, though, was not fully realized until after the dividing of the Anicinàpek at the "Third Stopping Place". Scholars have used the oral histories, archeology, and linguistics to estimate this took place about 2000 years ago, near present-day Detroit.

After contact with the Europeans, especially the French and Dutch, the Algonquin nations became active in the fur trade. This led them to fight against the powerful Haudenosaunee, whose confederacy was based in present-day New York. In 1570, the Algonquins formed an alliance with the Innu (Montagnais) to the east, whose territory extended to the ocean. Culturally, Omàmìwininì (Algonquin) and the Mississaugas (Michi Saagiig) were not part of the Ojibwe–Odawa–Potawatomi alliance known as the Council of Three Fires, though they did maintain close ties. Omàmìwininìwak (Algonquins) maintained stronger cultural ties with the Wendat, Abenaki, Atikamekw, and Cree, along with the Innu, as related above.

== History ==
=== French contact ===
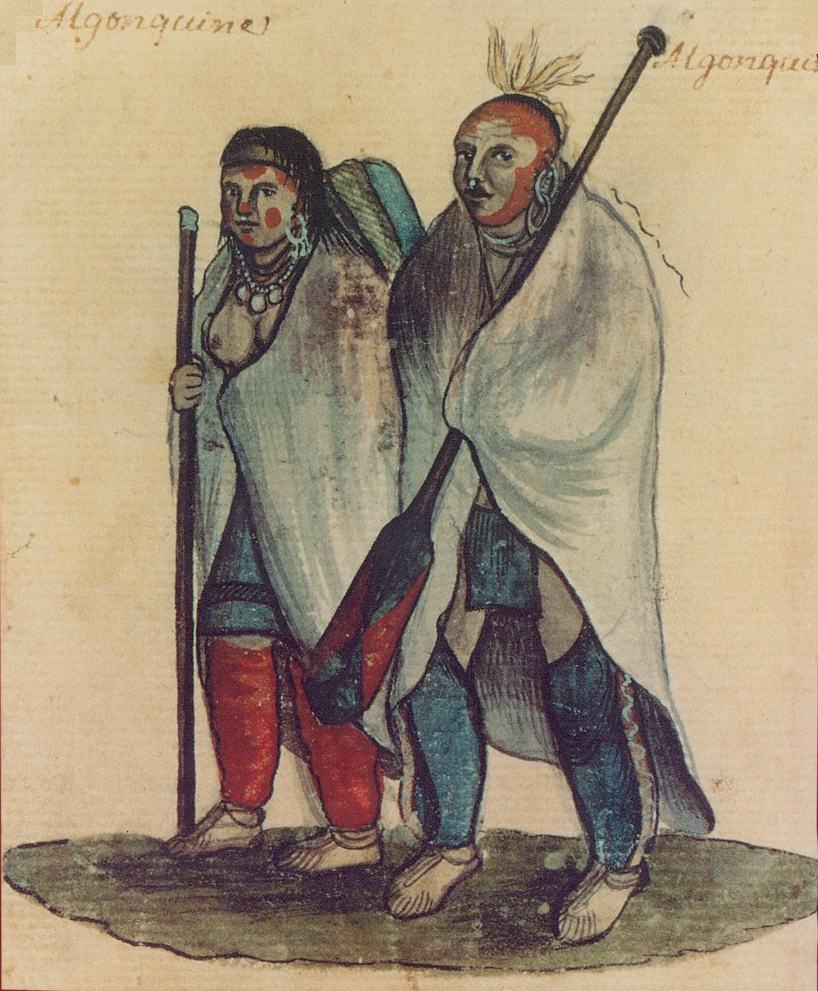
Algonquin couple, 18th-century watercolor. The first Algonquian encountered by the French were the Kitcisìpiriniwak ("Ottawa River Men"; singular: Kitcisìpirini), whose village was located on an island in the Ottawa River; the French called this group La Nation de l'Isle.

Algonquin first met Europeans when Samuel de Champlain came upon a party led by the Kitcisìpirini Chief Tessouat at Tadoussac, in eastern present-day Quebec, in the summer of 1603. They were celebrating a recent victory over the Iroquois, with the allied Montagnais and Etchemins (Malecite). Champlain did not understand that Algonquins were socially united by a strong totem/clan system rather than the European-styled political concept of nationhood. The several Algonquin bands each had its own chief. Within each band, the chief depended on political approval from each of the band's clan leaders. Champlain needed to cultivate relationships with numerous chiefs and clan leaders. From 1603, some of the Algonquins allied with the French under Champlain. This alliance proved useful to the Algonquin, who previously had little to no access to European firearms.

Champlain made his first exploration of the Ottawa River during May 1613 and reached the fortified Kitcisìpirini village at Morrison Island. Unlike the other Algonquin communities, the Kitcisìpiriniwak did not change location with the seasons. They had chosen a strategic point astride the trade route between the Great Lakes and the St. Lawrence River. They prospered through the collection of beaver pelts from Indigenous traders passing through their territory. They also were proud of their corn fields.

At first, the French used the term "Algonquin" only for a second group, the Wàwàckeciriniwak. However, by 1615, they applied the name to all of the Algonquin bands living along the Ottawa River. Because of keen interest by tribes to gain control of the lower Ottawa River, the Kitcisìpiriniwak and the Wàwàckeciriniwak came under fierce opposition. These two large groups allied together, under the leadership of Sachem (Carolus) Charles Pachirini, to maintain the Omàmiwinini identity and territory.

=== French-Indian War/Seven Years' War ===
The Iroquois Confederacy (Haudenosaunee) drove Algonquins from their lands. The Haudenosaunee were aided by having been traded arms by the Dutch, and later by the English. The Haudenosaunee and the English defeated the French and Algonquins in the 1620s, and, led by Sir David Kirke, occupied New France.

In 1623, having realized the occupation of New France demonstrated French colonial vulnerability, the French began to trade muskets to Algonquins and their allies. French Jesuits began to seek Algonquin conversions to Roman Catholicism.

Through all of these years, the Haudenosaunee never attacked the Kitcisìpirinik fortress. But, in 1642, they made a surprise winter raid, attacking Algonquins while most of their warriors were absent, and causing severe casualties. On March 6, 1647 (Ash Wednesday), a large Kanienkehaka (Mohawk) war party attacked the Kitcisìpiriniwak living near Trois-Rivières and almost exterminated them. The Kitcisìpiriniwak were still at Morrison Island in 1650 and inspired respect with their 400 warriors. When the French retreated from Wendat (Huron) country that year, Tessouat was reported to have had the superior of the Jesuit mission suspended by his armpits because he refused to offer him the customary presents for being allowed to travel through Algonquin territory.

Some joined the mission at Sillery, where they were mostly destroyed by an infectious disease epidemic by 1676. Encouraged by the French, others remained at Trois-Rivières. Their settlement at nearby Pointe-du-Lac continued until about 1830. That year the last 14 families, numbering about 50, moved to Kanesatake near Oka. (The families who stayed in Trois Rivieres can be found in the Algonquin census of Trois Rivieres in the mid-19th century).

=== 18th century to present ===
Signature of the Algonquin people on the Great Peace of Montreal (Mark of the Crane)

The Lake of Two Mountains band of Algonquins were located just west of the Island of Montreal, and were signatories to the Great Peace of Montreal in 1701. The Sulpician Mission of the Mountain was founded at Montreal in 1677.

In 1717, the King of France granted the Mohawk in Quebec a tract of land 9 miles long by 9 miles wide about 40 miles to the northwest of Montreal, under the condition that they leave the island of Montreal. Sulpician Missionaries set up a trading post at the village in 1721 and attracted a large number of Haudenosaunee converts to Christianity to the area. The settlement of Kanesatake was formally founded as a Catholic mission, a seigneury under the supervision of the Sulpician Order for 300 Christian Mohawk, about 100 Algonquins, and approximately 250 Nipissing peoples "in their care". Over time the Sulpicians claimed total control of the land, gaining a deed that gave them legal title. But the Haudenosaunee (Mohawks), Algonquins, and Nipissing understood that this land was being held in trust for them.

The Sulpician mission village of Lake of Two Mountains (Lac des Deux Montagnes), west of Montreal, became known both by its Algonquin language name Oka (meaning "pickerel"), and the Mohawk language Kanehsatà:ke ("sandy place"); however, Algonquin also called the village as Ganashtaageng after the Mohawk language name.

Algonquin warriors continued to fight in alliance with France until the British conquest of Quebec in 1760, during the Seven Years' War. After the British took over colonial rule of Canada, their officials sought to make allies of the First Nations, and the Algonquin, along with many other First Nations signed the Royal Proclamation of 1763, which was then ratified in 1764 as the Treaty of Niagara. Subsequently, fighting on behalf of the British Crown, Algonquins took part in the Barry St Leger campaign during the American Revolutionary War.

Following the American Revolutionary War, and later the War of 1812, the Lake of Two Mountains Algonquins found their territory increasingly encroached on by Loyalist settlers. Beginning in the 1820s and 1930s, the lumber industry began to move up the Ottawa valley. Algonquin became increasingly displaced as a result. Beginning in the 1820s, Algonquin Grand Chief Constant Pinesi sent a series of letters petitioning the British Crown for Algonquin Territorial Recognition previously agreed upon in the Treaties of 1701 and 1764, ratified by Algonquins and the British Crown. No responses were forthcoming from the British, and the Algonquins began to be relegated to a string of small reserves beginning in the 1830s.

Algonquins who agreed to move to these reserves or joined other historical bands were federally "recognized". Others maintained their attachment to the traditional territory and fur trading, and chose not to re-locate. These Algonquins were later called "stragglers" in the Ottawa and Pontiac counties with some eventually settling in small towns such as Renfrew, Whitney, and Eganville as the 19th Century progressed. Many of these Algonquins were not recognized as "Status Indians".

The location of the former Lake of Two Mountains Band came to be known as Kahnesatake. As a large majority of the Algonquin population had left the area, with only the Christian Haudenosaunee and a few Algonquins remaining, it became recognized as a Mohawk reserve (though many in the community have at least partial Algonquin Ancestry).

Algonquins living in the northern regions of Algonquin Territory gradually moved to towns such as present day Témiscaming, and Mattawa, amongst others in Ontario and Quebec, as territorial encroachment by settlers, and lumber and resource companies increased throughout the 19th and 20th centuries or various reserves set up in their traditional territories. In recent years, tensions with the lumber industry have flared up again among Algonquin communities, in response to the practice of clear-cutting.

In Ontario, an Algonquin land claim has been ongoing since 1983, encompassing much of the southeastern part of the province, stretching from near North Bay to near Hawkesbury and including Ottawa, Pembroke, and most of Algonquin Provincial Park. The Algonquins never relinquished title to this area. An agreement-in-principle between the Algonquins of Ontario, the Government of Canada and the Government of Ontario was reached in 2015. Many Algonquins dispute both the validity of both this settlement and the organization of the Algonquins of Ontario as a whole.

In 2000, Algonquins from Timiskaming First Nation played a significant part in the local popular opposition to the plan to convert Adams Mine into a garbage dump.

== Economy ==
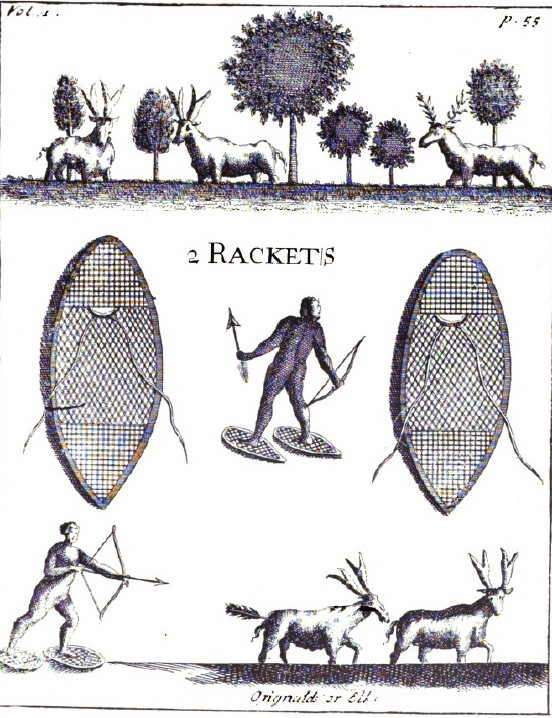
Rackets (snowshoes) used by Algonquin tribes for elk hunting

Historical Algonquin society was largely hunting and fishing-based. Being primarily a hunting nation, the people emphasized mobility. They used materials that were light and easy to transport. Canoes were made of birch bark, sewed with spruce roots and rendered waterproof by the application of heated spruce resin and bear grease. During winter, toboggans were used to transport material, and people used snowshoes to get around. The women used tikinaagan (cradleboards) to carry their babies. It was built with wood and covered with an envelope made of leather or material. The baby was standing up with his feet resting on a small board. The mother would then put the tikinàgan on her back. This allowed the infant to look around and observe his surroundings. The child was kept close to the mother but also had much stimulation.

Algonquian-speaking people also practiced agriculture, particularly south of the Great Lakes, where the climate allows for a longer growing season. Notable indigenous crops historically farmed by Algonquins are the sunflower and tobacco. Around 800CE, Eastern Algonquins adopted maize agriculture from their neighbors in the interior. Even among groups who mainly hunted, agricultural products were an important source of food. They obtained what was needed by trading with or raiding societies that practiced more agriculture. Eastern Algonquins created pots that could withstand not only thermal stress but the mechanical stress of rough use.

Archaeological sites on Morrison Island near Pembroke, within the territory of the later Kitcisìpiriniwak, reveal a 1,000-year-old culture that manufactured copper tools and weapons. Copper ore was extracted north of Lake Superior and distributed down to present-day northern New York. Local pottery artifacts from this period show widespread similarities that indicate the continuing use of the river for cultural exchange throughout the Canadian Shield and beyond.

Beginning at the latest in c. 1 CE, the Algonquin Nation inhabited the islands and shores along Kitcisìpi (Algonquin Language name translating to The Great River, known now as the Ottawa River). By the 17th century European Explorers found them well established as a hunter-gatherer society in control of the river. On Morrison Island, at the location where 5,000-year-old copper artifacts were discovered, the Kitcisìpiriniwak levied a toll on canoe flotillas descending the river.

== Ethnobotany ==
Algonquins of Quebec gather the berries of Ribes glandulosum and Viburnum nudum var. cassinoides as food, and eat and sell the fruit of Vaccinium myrtilloides. They take an infusion of Epigaea repens leaves for kidney disorders and apply a poultice of the gum or needles of Abies balsamea to open sores, insect bites, boils and infections. The needles are a sudatory for women after childbirth and are infused for a laxative tea, while the roots treat heart disease.

== Communities ==
At the time of their first meeting with the French in 1603, the various Algonquin bands probably had a combined population somewhere in the neighborhood of 6,000. The British estimate in 1768 was 1,500. As of 2000, there are close to 8,000 Algonquins in Canada, organized into ten separate First Nations: nine in Quebec and one in Ontario.

=== Historic ===
Algonquian Nations documented (by settlers) as early as 1630:

==== Quebec ====
- Kichesipirini ("people of the great river") — They were the largest and most powerful group of Algonquins. Known variously as: Kitcisìpirini, Kitcisìpiriniwak, Algoumequins de l'Isle-aux-Allumettes, Big River People, Gens d l'Isle, Honkeronon (Wyandot language), Island Algonquian, Island Indians, Island Nation, People from the Island, Kichesippiriniwek, Nation de l'Isle, Nation of the Isle, and Savages de l'Isle. Their main village was on Morrison Island.
- Kinounchepirini ("people of the Pickerel-waters") — Also known as Keinouche, Kinouchebiiriniwek, Kinònjepìriniwak, Kinonche, Pickerel, Pike and Quenongebin. Sometimes they were listed as an Algonquian band, but after 1650 they were associated with the Ottawa and were originally found along the lower Ottawa River below Allumette Island.
- Otaguottaouemin — Also known as Kotakoutouemi or Outaoukotwemiwek. They were located along the Upper Ottawa River above Allumette Island.
- Sàgaiganininiwak ("people of the lake") — Also known as Saghiganirini.
- Saginitaouigama — Also known as Sagachiganiriniwek.
- Weskarini ("people of the deer[-clan]") — Also known as the Wàwàckeciriniwak, La Petite Nation, Little Nation, Ouaouechkairini, Ouassouarini, Ouescharini, Ouionontateronon (Wyandot language), or Petite Nation. Their traditional home land is located on the north side of the Ottawa River along the Lievre River and the Rouge River in Quebec.

==== Ontario ====
- Iroquet — They were known as Hiroquet, Hirocay, Iroquay, Yroquetto, and to the Huron as the Atonontrataronon or Ononchataronon; they lived along Ontario's South Nation River.
- Matàwackariniwak "people of the bulrushed-shore" — Also known as Madawaska, Madwaska, Matouchkarine, Matouashita, Mataouchkarini, Matouechkariniwek and Matouescarini; the Madawaska River in the Upper Ottawa Valley is named after this band.
- Nibachis — Located at Muskrat Lake near present-day Cobden, Ontario.

=== Contemporary ===
==== Status nations in Quebec ====
- Kitigan Zibi Anishinabeg, Kitigan Zibi near Maniwaki (population 3,237)
- Timiskaming First Nation, Notre-Dame-du-Nord, Quebec (population 2,129)
- Nation Anishinabe du Lac Simon, Lac-Simon, Quebec (population 2,149)
- Conseil de la Première Nation Abitibiwinn, Pikogan, Quebec (population 1,059)
- Kebaowek First Nation, Témiscaming, Quebec (population 991)
- Long Point First Nation, Winneway River, Quebec (population 866)
- Algonquins of Barriere Lake, Lac Rapide (population 791)
- Kitcisakik Anicinape Community, Val-d'Or, Quebec (population 494)
- Wolf Lake First Nation, Témiscaming, Quebec (population 232) — formed from three historical bands:
  - Dumoine Lake Band of Algonquin, (historical)
  - Grassy Lake Band of Algonquin, (historical)
  - Lac des Quinze Band of Algonquin, (historical)

==== Status nations in Ontario ====
- Matachewan First Nation, Matachewan, Ontario (population 787) — formed in part by Algonquins
- Temagami First Nation, Temagami, Ontario (population 841) — formed in part by Algonquins
- Wahgoshig First Nation, Black River-Matheson, Ontario (population 332) — formed in part by Algonquins
- Algonquins of Pikwàkanagàn First Nation, Golden Lake, Ontario (population 2,635)

== See also ==
- Eliot Indian Bible
- Great Trail
- Kingdom of Saguenay
- Pieskaret
