= Weskarini Algonquin First Nation =

Native American tribe

The Weskarini Algonquin First Nation, also known as Wàwàckeciriniwak ("people of the deer[-clan]"), the Algonquian Proper, La Petite Nation, Little Nation, Ouaouechkairini, Ouassouarini, Ouescharini, Ouionontateronon (Wyandot language), or Petite Nation, are a group of indigenous peoples in Canada. They have been confused with the Petun in some writings, but are in fact a separate group. Their traditional homeland is located on the north side of the Ottawa River along the Lievre River and the Rouge River in Quebec. They also lived near Petite-Nation River which is so named in reference to the Weskarini.

The Weskarini had good trade relations with the Wyandot (which are mistaken for the Wendat Huron People) in their region before and during the early colonial period.

== Relations with the French ==
At the time of first contact with French settlers, the Weskarini traded at the mouths of the St. Maurice, Dumoine, and Gatineau Rivers. Initially allied with the French during the early colonial period, many Weskarini intermarried with French settlers.

== Conflicts and the Scattering of the People ==
The Weskarini were also allied with the Arendahronon (Rock Tribe/Clan) Huron. These groups often wintered together, and both groups engaged in conflicts with the Iroquois. Many Weskarini eventually moved to Trois-Rivières to seek help from the Jesuits. The Jesuits offered protection only to those who converted to Catholicism. During a major Iroquois offensive in 1652, the main band of Weskarini fled north from the Ottawa River. Many were massacred near their sacred Mont Tremblant, deep inside their ancestral territory.

== Sacred Places ==
Manitonga Soutana: Known as Mont Tremblant, this contemporary French name references the sacred mountain known as Manitou Ewitchi Saga, the mountain of the great god, or Manitonga Soutana, the mountain of the spirits. This sacred place trembles when humans make too many changes to the natural order of things.

Migizi Kiishkaabikaan: Also known as Oiseau Rock or Bird Rock. This rock, located in Oiseau Bay, is covered with many petroglyphs.

== Contemporary Weskarini ==
Today, many Weskarini descendants (some of whom primarily consider themselves “mixed,” which is sometimes expressed in French as “métis” - not to be confused with the completely separate Métis culture that developed in the Red River region of Manitoba. Whereas there are other direct blood descendants who identify solely as Algonquin “Weskarini”) work to rebuild their knowledge of the Algonquin language and shared cultural identity. Some contemporary Weskarini express concerns over the ongoing development of sacred Manitonga Soutana, the destruction of land and water in unceded territory, and the appropriation and trademarking of the Weskarini name by developers in the area.
