= Algonquins of Ontario Settlement Area =

Negotiated land area in Canada

The Algonquins of Ontario Settlement Area covers 36,000 square kilometers of land under Aboriginal title in eastern Ontario, home to more than 1.2 million people.

The Algonquins of Ontario comprise the First Nations of Antoine, Algonquins of Pikwakanagan First Nation, Bonnechere, Greater Golden Lake, Kijicho Manito Madaouskarini (Bancroft), Mattawa/North Bay, Ottawa, Shabot Obaadjiwan (Sharbot Lake), Snimikobi (Ardoch), and Whitney & Area.

In 1994, the group began negotiations with the Government of Ontario and Government of Canada "to resolve this land claim through a negotiated settlement".

== Negotiations ==
=== History ===
In response to British land grabs, the Algonquins first submitted a petition to the governor general in 1772, asking the Government of the United Kingdom to consider people already living on the land when taking and selling parcels. It did not cease and land was continually developed by the Crown without input from the Algonquin representative body, including farm land allocations post-World War II. The Constitution Act, 1982, ratified the "Rights of the Aboriginal Peoples of Canada", including the right to make new land treaties. In 1983, the Algonquins submitted a petition to Edward Shreyer, the then governor of Canada, to regain the land around the Mattawa River.

In 1991, the Government of Ontario accepted the claim for negotiations and the Government of Canada accepted the claim in 1992. Negotiations for the Settlement Area officially began in 1994 when the Statement of Shared Objectives was signed by all parties.

In 2001, negotiations stalled when Ontario and Canada proclaimed that they would return to the table if Algonquin side had a group that represented all people that may exercise Indigenous/First Nation rights on the settlement area. In response, the Algonquins of Ontario, a group consisting of ten Indigenous communities in eastern Ontario, was formed in 2005.

In 2016, the governments of Canada and Ontario signed an agreement in principle, though no timeline was provided. Following this agreement, chiefs from some of Iroquois and Algonquin First Nations claimed that the agreement did not represent the vast majority of their territory, as the proposed deal would transfer 117,500 acres of Crown land to Algonquin ownership, while their claim is to almost 900,000 acres. Additionally, questions were raised about the accuracy of tracing Algonquin ancestry to the members of the Algonquin negotiations team, The Algonquins of Ontario.

As of 2020, negotiations were ongoing.

=== Logistics ===
In negotiations, land within the territory is broken into three categries: Proposed Settlement Lands, Other Algonquin Interests on Crown Land and Recommended Provincial Park/Park Addition.

== Area ==
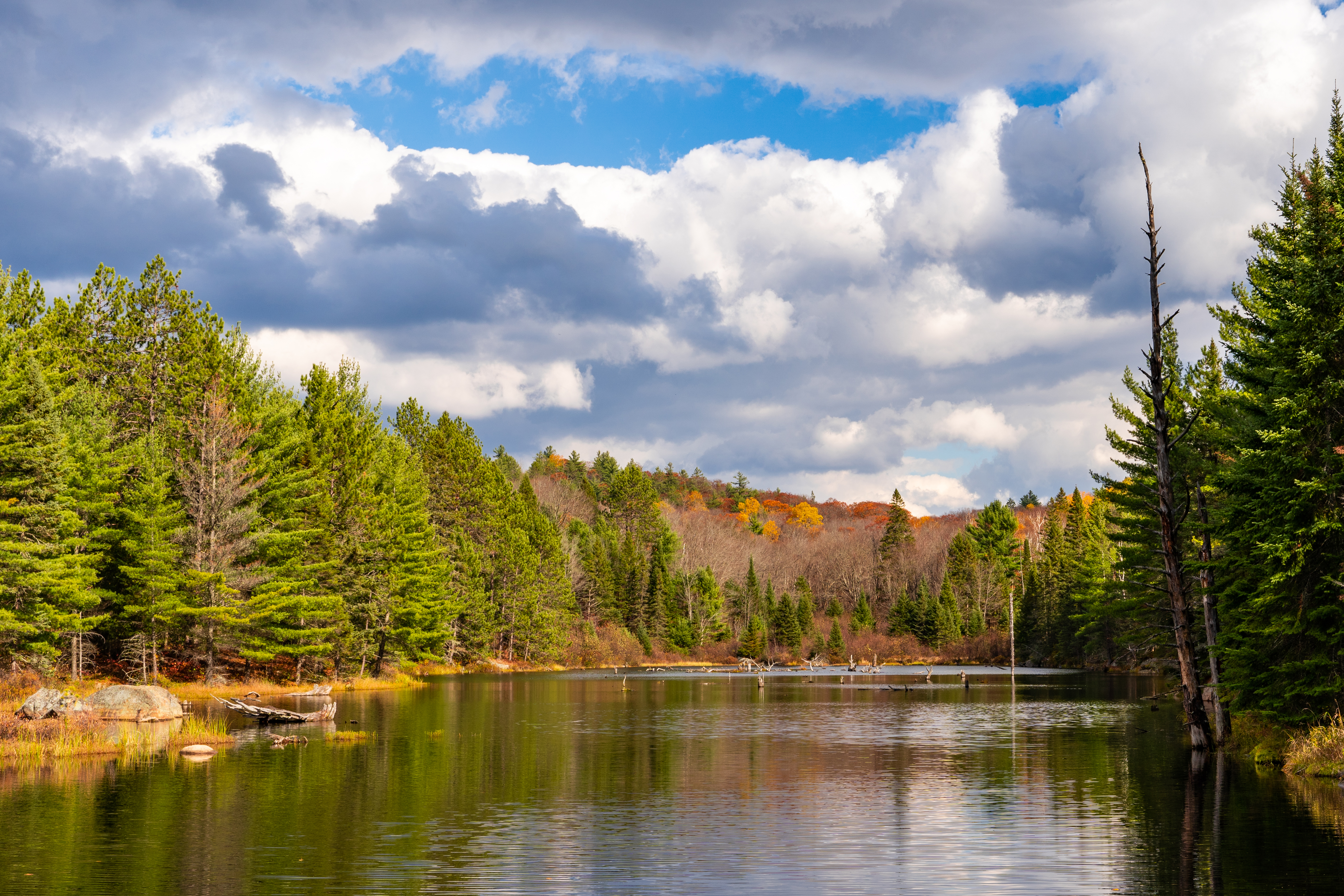
A lake in Algonquin Provincial Park, Ontario, Canada

The settlement area includes parts of the following counties: United Counties of Stormont, Dundas and Glengarry; Unites Counties of Prescott and Russell; County of Lanark; County of Renfrew; County of Frontenac; County of Haliburton; County of Hastings.

Although there are several smaller protected parks within the Settlement Area, the majority of Protected Land is in Algonquin Provincial Park, which spans 7,635 square kilometers.

Alongside numerous flora and fauna, the park notably contains old-growth sugar maple, hemlock and yellow birch forests, which researchers have dated at up to 430 years old using ring counts and up to 610 years old using estimation techniques.
