= Tessouat =

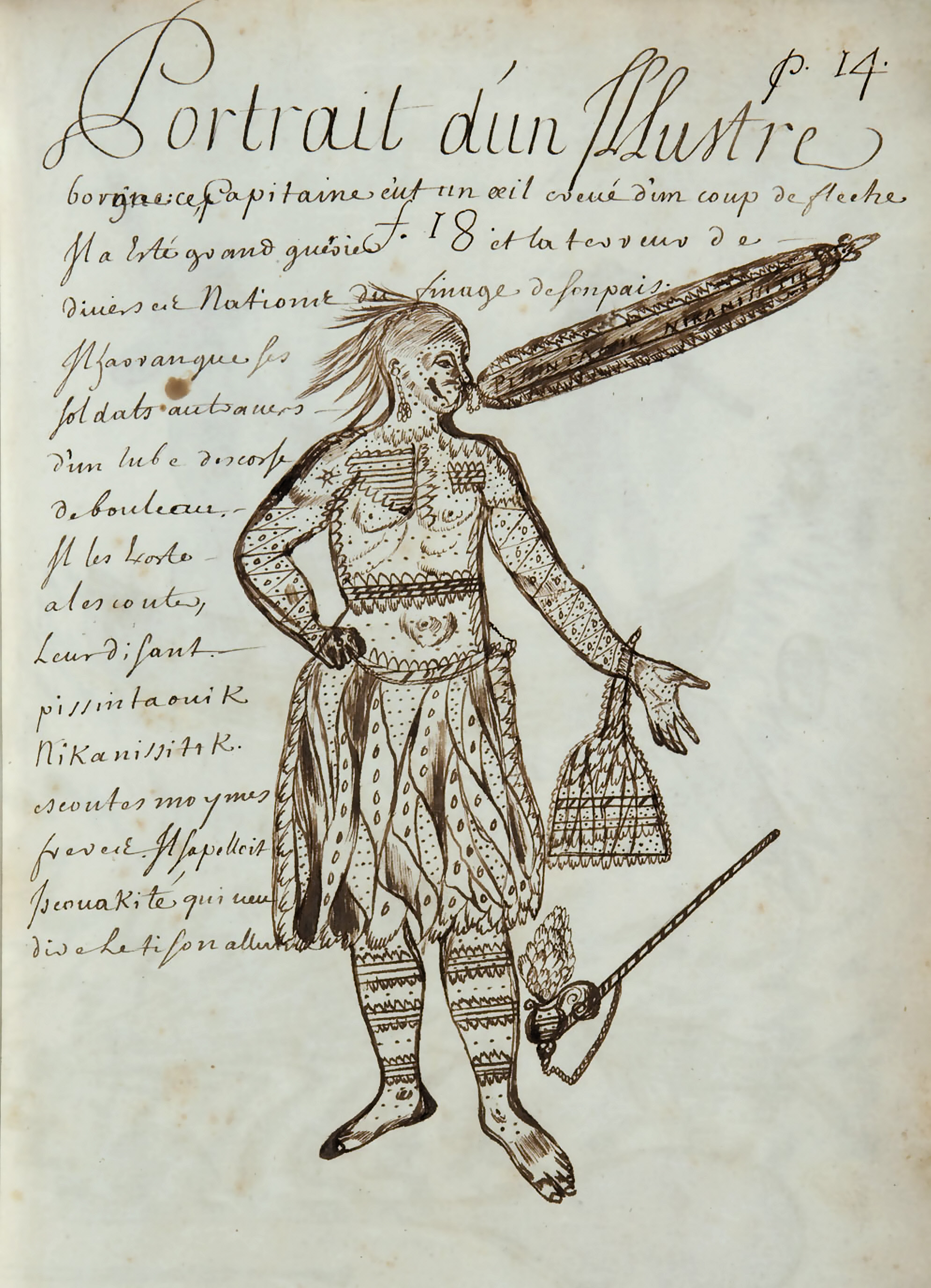
Codex canadensis

Tessouat (Anishinaabe: Tesswehas) (c. ??? – 1636–1654) was an Algonquin chief from the Kitchesipirini nation ("Kitche"=Great, "sipi"=river, "rini"=people: the people from the great river, the Ottawa River). His nation lived in an area extending from Lake of Two Mountains to modern-day Pembroke, Ontario.

Tessouat lived in L'Isle-aux-Allumettes, in a neck of the Ottawa River. He was described by the French settlers as having a strong character. He was also blind in one eye (in French, borgne) and was dubbed "le Borgne de l'isle". His position was highly strategic, as the Ottawa River was the safest way to go from the St. Lawrence River to Hudson Bay and to Huronia, near Georgian Bay. Tessouat took advantage of his position to impose some sort of customs duties on the French fur traders navigating on the Ottawa River, as well as to impose some of his authority. For example, in 1633, he refused to let the Jesuits go to Huronia, fearing he would lose authority in the region. To maintain the economic supremacy of the Kitchisipirini, he made great efforts to keep his French, Wendat (Huron), and Odawa allies from trading with each other directly, preferring that they trade through Algonquin middlemen.

At that time, the Algonquins, Wendats, and several other Great Lakes First Nations were at war with the Iroquois Confederacy. Yet, Tessouat initiated peace talks with the Mohawk nation and, in 1634, they agreed to a peace treaty. The alleged motive behind this political move was to gain access to the Dutch settlers in what is now known the New York State, perhaps in order to be in a better negotiating position with the French traders. Peace with the Mohawks only lasted two years and Tessouat died a few months after bloody fights against the Mohawks.

In 1641, after Tessouat's death, in the fashion of an Algonquian custom, a new Tessouat was reborn. The custom consisted of bringing back to life an important dead chief in a highly spectacular ritual. The new Tessouat was brought to life to save the Kitchesipirini nation, which was by then afflicted by death, caused by the European diseases, and isolated after several losses to the Iroquoian confederation. Strangely enough, the new Tessouat was also blind in one eye. This fact probably contributed to muddle the French, who sometimes did not distinguish the new Tessouat from the old one. To save his nation, the new Tessouat decided to move from the Ottawa River area to a place nearby the French. After going to Sillery (nearby Quebec), where the Wendats refused their hospitality, Tessouat decides to bring his nation to Montreal island, where he agrees to receive the Christian baptism. In 1647, fearing an attack from the Iroquois and suspecting that the French would not defend them, Tessouat and his nation moved again. The new Tessouat finally died at Trois-Rivières, in 1654.
