= List of cinemas in Ottawa-Gatineau =

This is a list of movie theatres that have existed in Ottawa–Gatineau.

== Current cinemas ==
Ottawa

Name	Location	Opening date	Screens			Notes	Image
Name	Location	Opening date	2D	3D	Large	Notes	Image
ByTowne Cinema	325 Rideau St.	1980s	1	NA	NA	The ByTowne Cinema is a one-screen repertory movie theatre located in Ottawa, Ontario, The cinema is one of Ottawa's main venues for independent and foreign films. The 650-seat cinema is located on Rideau Street at Nelson, several blocks east of the Rideau Centre. It was closed on December 24, 2020, with a final week of screenings shown on February 26 to March 7, 2021. The cinema reopened under new ownership on September 8, 2021.	
Canadian Film Institute - Primary Auditorium	395 Wellington St.	~1985	1	—N/a	—N/a	Auditorium in the Library and Archives Canada Building.	
Canadian Film Institute - River Building Theatre	43 Campus Ave. (corner of University Dr.), Carleton University	2015	1	—N/a	—N/a	400 seats with living-wall foyer and patio on the Rideau River.	
Canadian Film Institute - Club Saw	67 Nicholas St.		1	—N/a	—N/a	Can accommodate 150 people, has a bar, a state-of-the-art sound system with video, 16mm, and 35mm projectors. Functions as a community gathering place for live events as well.	
Cineplex Odeon Barrhaven	131 Riocan Avenue	October 21, 2005	2	5	—N/a	Currently the smallest Cineplex Entertainment cinema in the National Capital Region. This cinema offers advance seat selection at no extra charge. The long-term plan is to retrofit all 7 theatres with reclining leather seats and begin to offer alcohol service in the lobby.	
Cineplex Cinemas Ottawa	3090 Carling Avenue	July 12, 1998	5	6	1 (UltraAVX 2D/3D)	Originally opened by Famous Players as Coliseum Ottawa, this was Ottawa's first modern megaplex when it opened in 1998. The Britannia Drive-In (1949-1997) and Britannia 6 (1977-1998) were demolished to make way for the new theatre. It is home to the city's first Xscape Entertainment Centre, which opened in the summer of 2013. As part of the effort to simplify their brand, Cineplex Entertainment rebranded the building as Cineplex Cinemas Ottawa. The cinema has since been completely retrofitted with fully reclining leather seats in all theatres, as well as alcohol service (beer, wine and cider) in the atrium and advance seat reservation free of charge.	
Cineplex Cinemas Lansdowne and VIP	325 Marche Way, Unit 107	March 27, 2015	2	7 (4 V.I.P. 19+)	1 (Dolby Atmos UltraAVX 3D with D-BOX Motion Seats)	Empire Theatres originally announced plans to open a theatre in the soon-to-be redeveloped Lansdowne Park. Landmark Cinemas took control of the future on-paper-only lease in late October 2013. Cineplex Entertainment would eventually claim ownership of the space and proceeded to construct a 3-storey, 10-screen theatre in the Central-North area of the redeveloped Lansdowne Park. This is the first Cineplex VIP location in the National Capital Region and the first cinema in Ottawa to have adults-only screens. The first floor features a modernised box office consisting of only self-serve kiosks with customer service assistants on standby as well as a large Xscape Entertainment Centre, in addition to a food service area consisting of Poptopia, YoYo's Yogurt Cafe and Starbucks Coffee. The second floor consists of a concession stand and 5 digital screens, 3 of which are 3D-compatible. The third floor contains the a Dolby Atmos UltraAVX screen, with 3D compatibility, multiple rows of D-BOX motion seats at the back of the theatre and its own dedicated concession stand which also includes full alcohol service. The third floor also includes a dedicated 19+ VIP area which includes a full-service bar and restaurant lounge, 4 VIP screens, a dedicated concession stand and premium personal restrooms. The entire third floor is equipped with partial reclining leather seats (with the exception of the D-BOX Motion Seats) and the entire theatre offers advance seat selection at no extra charge. Every ticket includes 3 hours of free underground parking which can be validated at the Xscape Entertainment Centre on the first floor.	
Ciné-Starz Orléans	250 Centrum Blvd, Orleans	Late 1980s	6	?	?	Opened as Cineplex Odeon Orleans Town Centre in the late 1980s. It was sold to Empire Theatres in 2005 as a condition of the Cineplex and Famous Players merger. Empire closed this location in 2009 to focus on its new Orleans location. Mayfair rebuilt this theatre (with 3 active screens) and obtained a lease from December 2011 to February 2013. The location was eventually taken over by the Ciné-Starz chain, with renovations completed on 3 theaters that had been left idle when the location was run by Mayfair, to bring the theater to its current configuration of 6 screens. It currently functions as a second-run theater.	
Landmark Cinemas 24 Kanata	801 Kanata Avenue	September 3, 1999	23	?	1 (Digital IMAX 2D/3D)	Constructed by AMC Theatres, sold to Empire Theatres in 2012 and bought by Landmark in 2013. Landmark Cinemas Kanata is the largest cinema complex in Ottawa with 24 screens, one of which is a digital IMAX 3D screen. The cinema has since been retrofitted with fully reclining leather seats and advance seat selection free of charge.	
Landmark Cinemas 10 Orleans	3752 Innes Road	2013	9	?	1 (Extra/Extra 3D)	Constructed by Empire Theatres in 2008 and bought by Landmark in 2013. Features a former Empire Extra 3D theatre, now branded as simply Extra 3D. The cinema has since been retrofitted with fully reclining leather seats and advance seat selection free of charge.	
Mayfair Theatre	1074 Bank Street	1932–	1	—N/a	—N/a	Today it is Ottawa's premier venue for second run films. It has gradually phased out its repertoire programming over the years, but still continues its tradition of screening the cult classic The Rocky Horror Picture Show every Halloween.	
Ottawa Family Cinema	Rideau Community Hub, 815 St-Laurent Boulevard	1977-	—N/a	1	—N/a	A volunteer-run, not-for-profit cinema, in operation since 1977, that plays second-run movies on Saturdays (children's theme) using a modern Dolby 3D digital projector and Dolby Digital 7.1 sound. 700-seat capacity. Door prizes and special holiday event performances.	
Imagine Cinemas Ottawa	St. Laurent Shopping Centre 1200 St. Laurent Blvd	1967–	5	Dropped	—N/a	A second run theater in the St. Laurent Shopping Centre. This five-screen cinema, originally opened as a single screen cinema, known as the St. Laurent Theatre, opened in 1967 and was a first run cinema. It was later converted to two screens and later to five screens, by taking over unoccupied space in the St. Laurent Shopping Centre. It was closed in 2001 and reopened as the Rainbow in 2005. The cinema is currently owned by Ciné Starz since February 28, 2020.	
Scotiabank Theatre Ottawa	2385 City Park Drive	May 19, 1999	9	6	1 (IMAX 2D/3D)	One of Canada's busiest theatres by attendance. Owned and operated by Cineplex Entertainment and the only Cineplex-owned cinema in Ottawa to feature a digital IMAX 3D screen. It is home to the city's third Xscape Entertainment Centre, which opened in the fall of 2017 and features Canada's first D-Box VR theatre attraction. The cinema was originally known as SilverCity Gloucester before being rebranded as part of the simplification of Cineplex Entertainment brand cinemas. The cinema has also started to offer alcohol service (beer, wine and cider) in the lobby and advance seat selection free of charge. Work started on August 19, 2019, to retrofit all 16 theatres with reclining leather seats.	
Cineplex Odeon South Keys Cinemas	2214 Bank Street	1995	7	5	—N/a	A modern multiplex built by Cineplex Odeon in the city's south end. This is the first cinema in the Ottawa are to offer Stadium seating in its theatres. This is the only multiplex cinema in Canada showing first-run movies from 10 am every day. The long-term plan is to retrofit all 12 theatres with reclining leather seats and begin to offer alcohol service in the lobby.	

Gatineau

Name	Location	Opening date	Screens	Arcade	Notes	Image
Cinéma 9	Boulevard Maloney & De l'Hopital	Mid-1990s	9	Yes	Plays usually the French version of movies since StarCite in Hull was opened.	—N/a
IMAX	Canadian Museum of History	?	2	No	Both the largest screen and the only 70mm film IMAX theatre in the Ottawa-Gatineau region. A recent renovation has split the space into two screens, one of which can only play 70mm IMAX 2D features while the other can also play IMAX Dome and IMAX 3D features. The dome itself is designed to be mechanically retracted into the ceiling to permit the broadcast of traditional IMAX 2D and IMAX 3D features.	—N/a
StarCité Hull	Le Plateau	Late 1990s	16	Yes	Formerly owned by Famous Players, it was sold along with 6 other Quebec locations to Fortune Cinemas in 2006 to satisfy a regulatory requirement to complete the merger with Cineplex Entertainment. In 2010, Cineplex Entertainment acquired the assets of the bankrupt Fortune Cinemas chain, including StarCite Hull and the 6 other former Cineplex theatres previously divested.	—N/a

== Defunct ==
Ottawa

Name	Location	Dates	Screens	Notes	Image
Airport Drive-In	Uplands Drive at Hunt Club Road	1970–1997	3	It opened on May 15, 1970, and closed in the fall of 1997. It had 3 screens and could hold approximately 1160 cars. It has been torn down and is now a parking lot for a national airport shuttle service.	
Aladdin Drive-In	4004 Albion Road	1951–1995	1	Opened July 13, 1951. It had room for approximately 480 cars. It is now an empty field and, as of 2023, remains the only Ottawa drive-in location not to be re-developed.	
Auto Sky Drive-In	Fisher and Baseline Road	1948–1981		Opened on July 29, 1948. After the drive-in closed, a housing development was built on the vacant land.	
The Avalon	Bank Street in the Glebe	1928–1956	1	November 17, 1928–July 1947. The Avalon had 876 seats. Renamed Glebe August 22, 1947 – October 17, 1956. Now a hardware store.	
Bennett's Vaudeville Theatre	Sparks Street just west of Bank	1906-1921	1	In 1907, it became the first place in Ottawa to regularly show films.	
Britannia Drive-In	3090 Carling Avenue	1948–1997	2	Opened on July 15, 1948 with one screen at the North end of the property and a smaller screen added to the South end of the lot sometime between 1965 and 1976. It was the last Drive-In in Ottawa when it closed in 1997. The Cineplex Ottawa (formerly Coliseum) is built on its location.	
Britannia 6	3090 Carling Avenuehttps://ottawastart.com/dark-clouds-hang-over-the-auto-sky-a-history-of-ottawas-first-drive-in-movie-complex/	1977–1998	6	The theatre was built on the land to the West of the North Drive-in screen and its parking lot was built to the North and the East of the North Drive-in screen. The building was torn down after the Coliseum (now Cineplex Ottawa) opened.	
Capitol Cinema	90 Bank Street	1920–1970	1	Originally opened as Loews Theatre, the Capitol was Ottawa's largest and most ornate cinema for many decades. It opened in 1920 and was demolished in 1970. it had approximately 2,528 seats, the most ever for an Ottawa theatre. Live theatrical productions (e.g. A Midsummer Night's Dream) and live musical performances such as Louis Armstrong, the Who (Bootleg recording on October 15, 1969, is around), the Paul Butterfield Blues Band, Jimi Hendrix and Cream (among many others) took place on its stage. Its auditorium was often used for political conventions. In 1964 there were plans to split it into 2 screens but this never happened. When the National Arts Centre was built, there was no longer any need for the Capitol's stage and auditorium to be used for live theatre or concerts.	
Capitol Square Cinemas	230 Queen Street	1972–1999	3	The Capitol Square 3 opened around 1972 and closed in 1999. It was operated by Famous Players.	
Eastview Theatre	Montreal Road (on same site as the Vanier Cinema)			Closed as a cinema in the 1950s, the building was used as a post office and then as an electrical parts store until demolished in the 1960s to be replaced in the 1970s by the building that housed the Vanier Cinema.	
Elgin Theatre	216 Elgin Street	1937–1994	1, later 2	The Elgin opened in 1937 and 10 years later, a second theatre named the Little Elgin was opened next to it in the same building. Before closing in 1994, the two theatres were called the Elgin 1 and Elgin 2. The Elgin/Little Elgin was the first twin movie theatre in Canada.	
Elmdale Theatre	1196 Wellington Street West	1947–1994	1	It opened on September 9, 1947, and was twinned (bowling-alley style) on October 23, 1981. It closed on August 25, 1994. It is now a church of the Pentecostal Assemblies of the World congregation.	
Family Theatre	204 Queen Street	1910 to 1925 ?	1	Closed and demolished.	
Landmark Cinemas	World Exchange Plaza, 111 Albert Street, 3rd Floor	1991–2013	7	Opened as Cineplex Odeon Exchange Centre Cinemas with an unknown number of theatres in 1991, it expanded to seven theatres in 1994 with a mix of mainstream and independent films. It was sold to Empire Theatres in 2005 as a condition of the Cineplex and Famous Players merger. Empire Theatres ran the theatre until late October, 2013 when its assets were purchased by Cineplex Entertainment and Landmark Cinemas. Landmark Cinemas procured the lease for the location and reopened the cinema on October 31, 2013; however, they let the lease for the space expire on December 31, 2013. Despite rumours that a different theatre operator would reopen the location as a cinema, which were fuelled by the impending 2018 opening of the OC Transpo Confederation Line (Line 1) and its direct integration into the World Exchange Plaza via Parliament LRT Station, the landlord decided to renovate the former theatre and lobby spaces. On January 24, 2017, it was announced that Klipfolio dashboard would open corporate offices in the place of the old cinema.	
Flower Theatre	128 Sparks Street	1914 - 1918	1	Owned by N.L. Nathanson. It is said to have had a retractable roof. In 1918, Nathanson sold it to Paramount, who renamed it The Strand.	
Français Theatre	On the West side of Dalhousie Street between George Street and York Street.	1913-07-23 to 1961		R. E. Maynard owned the Français, which had 999 seats. It opened in 1913. It was very popular with the kids during Saturday afternoon performances. They called the theatre "Frog". It served as Ottawa's French language cinema, until the 1960s (1961) when it was closed for repairs for many years and eventually demolished to make way for the construction of a Holiday Inn.	
Gaiety Theatre	45 Rideau Street	Closed in late 1912.		According to the Ottawa Journal, 20 April 1912 the Gaiety Theatre and lot were sold to Mr. D. Chambers, furnisher, of 55 Rideau St. for $2,500 for the purposes of extending his store.	
Gloucester Five	Gloucester Centre, 1980 Ogilvie Road	Closed in late March 2001.	5	Each of this cinema's auditoriums was named instead of numbered. According to an article in the Ottawa Citizen of March 21, 2001, the Gloucester Five's closure was largely due to its proximity to Silvercity Gloucester.	
Imperial Theatre	325 Bank Street	1914–1955	1	The Imperial Theatre, opened on August 24th, 1914, was celebrated for its grandeur. Referred to as ‘Canada’s most gorgeous,’ it boasted luxurious features like padded opera seats. Harry Brouse, its founder, was a prominent figure in Ottawa's theater scene. However, the rise of television led to its decline, and by 1955, the once-thriving theater closed its doors permanently. Is currently home to Barrymore's.	
Linden Theatre	5 Beechwood Avenue	1947–1968		Became the Towne Cinema in the 1970s and was eventually converted into a sports equipment store and then a drug store. For 25 cents on weekends, one could see five movies (usually horror, comedy or western).	
Mall Theatre	116 Sparks Street	1915–1973	1	Originally The Centre Theatre which had 998 seats. It had no stairs to reach the upper seats, just ramps. During the second World War, a royal box was set up for Queen Juliana of the Netherlands, which was occupied by Nazi Germany. In June 1968 the theatre was renamed Mall and shown adult movies.	
Nelson Cinema	325 Rideau Street	1947–September 18, 1988	1	The Nelson Cinema occupied 940 seats. It closed in 1988 and was renovated and re-opened in 1989 as The ByTowne Cinema.	
Odeon Theatre	on West side of Bank Street between Slater Street and Laurier Avenue.			A coal gas explosion in an office building behind the Odeon happened on October 25, 1958, killing two and destroying the back end of the theatre only hours before the cinema was to have been filled with children for a Saturday morning viewing of films for school safety patrols. As many as 600 could have been killed, or seriously injured, had this been a working day.	
Phoenix	413 Bank Street	Closed in 1991	1	Operated by Cineplex Odeon, this theatre specialized in foreign films such as La historia official. The theatre was demolished shortly after it closed, and has been a gravel parking lot ever since (see Rialto listing below). Also known as Clarey and Fern.	
Place de Ville Cinemas	Place de Ville's underground shopping complex, 300 Sparks Street	1971–1996	2	Operated by Famous Players. According to an Ottawa Citizen article of August 14, 1999, these theatres still exist but remain empty and unused. In the fall of 2010 the former cinema space was occupied by an exhibition company and public exhibits such as the Titanic and Body Works were on display. The theatre is rumoured to re-open with the impending operation of the OC Transpo Confederation Line (Line 1) bringing many prospective customers directly to the underground complex of Place de Ville, which is directly connected to the future Lyon LRT Station.	
Queensway Drive-In	Montreal Road & Queensway East	1963–1986	2	Opened August 29th 1963. Now the site of an industrial park. Made famous in Bryan Adams song Summer Of 69.	
Regent Theatre	Bank and Sparks	1916–1972	1	Currently the site of the Bank of Canada complex. In 1928 became the first theatre in Ottawa to play films with sound. It had 1056 seats.	
Rexy Theatre	136 Lorne Street / 777 Somerset Street West	Closed		Opened as the Rex Theatre in 1914, in one of Ottawa's blue-collar neighbourhoods west of downtown, this theatre had the unusual distinction of being located on a residential side street. Originally a small 300-seat nickelodeon, in 1927 it was renamed Rexy Theatre and completely remodelled into an atmospheric theatre. Seating was then expanded to 750 and a new front entrance was added on the main Somerset Street West, through the purchase of a retail space in an adjacent building. It catered to the neighbourhood with B-movies and kids' serials until TV took its toll. The Rexy Theatre closed in 1954 and was demolished in 1956. The entrance was moved to 777 Somerset West in 1925.	
Rialto	413 Bank Street	1943–1991	1	Opened by Odeon Theatres in 1943. Through the 1970s it fell into hard times, and was known colloquially as "the Rat Hole" due to a rodent infestation. It was purchased by Cineplex Odeon, renamed "The Phoenix," closed and quickly demolished in 1991. As of August 2017, it was a parking lot on Bank Street.	
Rideau Centre Cinemas	Rideau Centre, 50 Rideau Street	1983–2013	3	Opened as Famous Players Rideau in 1983, it was sold to Empire Theatres in 2005 as a condition of the Cineplex and Famous Players merger. It was located on the top level of the Rideau Centre and targeted the teenage demographic, showing mostly PG-13 first-run movies. Empire ceased operations at this theatre on March 21, 2013, shortly before the massive Rideau Centre expansion and redevelopment began. As part of the renovations the entire theatre space was gutted and is now used as the second floor of retail store La Maison Simons.	
Rideau Theatre	160 Rideau Street	1915–1982	1	Located on Rideau Street immediately to the west of where Dalhousie St. once ended. The building still stands and is divided into various retail stores and the theatre space is now occupied by the Bourbon Room nightclub. The long rectangular lobby of the Rideau Theatre was originally the Palace Theatre. The Palace Theatre became the lobby of the Rideau Theatre when a new auditorium was built behind the original Palace Theatre.	
Somerset Theatre	386 Somerset Street West	1937–2000	1	It was demolished soon after closure to accommodate an expansion of a supermarket and its parking complex.	
Star-Top Drive-In	1400 Cyrville Road	1951–1975		Opened on August 31, 1951 on Cyrville Road. It closed in 1974 and the land is now used for an industrial park.	
Strand Theatre (1918)	128 Sparks Street	1918–1921	1	Was opened originally, by N.L. Nathanson, as the Flower Theatre (1914 - 1918). In 1918, Nathanson sold it to Paramount, who renamed it The Strand.	
Strand Theatre (1950)	1265 Bank Street	1950–1954	1	After closing it became a bingo parlour, which was demolished in 2002 and replaced by a donut shop.	
Vanier Cineplex	150 Montreal Road	1980–1990s	7	This Cineplex Odeon theatre was located in a small shopping mall. It was a second-run theatre before closing in the mid 1990s.	
Westboro Theatre	381 Richmond Road	1941–1955		Now home to the Ottawa Carleton Mortgage Inc.	
Westgate Cinema	Westgate Shopping Centre, 1309 Carling Avenue	1980–2000	3	Opened on November 14th, 1980. Located on the second floor of the mall, the theatre showed first run movies for most of its existence and second run movies for two dollars before it closed in 2000. Currently occupied by a software development company that still uses one of the cinemas for meetings and presentations.	

Gatineau

Name	Location	Years active	Screens	Arcade	Notes	Image
Ciné-Parc Templeton	1779 Boulevard Maloney Est	Early 1990s-2019	2	No	A drive-in theater that featured both English and French films playing simultaneously on 2 separate screens. The theater announced its closure prior to the 2019 season, with equipment being transferred to a theater located in Val-Morin.	—N/a
Cinéma Place-Cartier	119 Place du Portage	1937–1991	?	No	It was the grandest cinema in the Outaouais. It was sold by Famous Players in 1968 and became a pornography theatre before it was purchased by the City of Hull in order to put it out of business. Currently the offices of a training company.	—N/a
Cinéma Place-Cartier	425 Boulevard St. Joseph	?–Early 1980s	?	No	Exploitation grindhouse.	—N/a
Cinéma l'Amour	569 Boulevard St. Joseph	?–Early 1980s	?	No	Pornography cinema.	—N/a
Cinéma de Paris	185 rue Laval	1949–1986	?	No	Now Mon Chez Nous.	—N/a
Ciné-Starz Gatineau	Les Promenades de l'Outaouais	?–2013	4	Yes	—N/a	—N/a
Cinéma Aylmer	Galeries d'Aylmer	?–2020	4	Dropped	The location functioned as an independent first-run theater for approximately 20 years. It was shut down during the Covid-19 pandemic, with the owners citing changes in the film industry.	—N/a
Pussycat Cinema	424 Boulevard St. Joseph	?–Early 1980s	?	No	Pornography cinema.	—N/a

== See also ==
- List of cinemas in Toronto
