= Defence Public Affairs Learning Centre =

Canadian military training institution

The Defence Public Affairs Learning Centre (DPALC) is a Canadian military training institution that provides Department of National Defence and Canadian Armed Forces personnel with specialized military public affairs and communications training. It is part of the Assistant Deputy Minister (Public Affairs) organization and executes its mandate under the authority of the Canadian Defence Academy.

== Mission ==
The mission of the DPALC is to give defence personnel, especially Canadian Armed Forces members, the training and expertise they need to connect effectively with Canadians, and to develop a cadre of professional Public Affairs Officers in the Canadian Armed Forces.

== History ==
Prior to the establishment of the DPALC, Canadian Armed Forces Public Affairs Officers (a distinct Canadian military tri-service occupation) were trained at the United States Department of Defense's Defense Information School (DINFOS) at Fort George G. Meade, Maryland and then received on-the-job training.

In 1992, due to a requirement for more Canada-specific training, the training was repatriated. For several years, Public Affairs Officers were trained through an eight-week joint venture between the Canadian Armed Forces and Ryerson Polytechnic University in Toronto. In the mid-1990s, the Canadian Armed Forces again began sending members to DINFOS, but this time offered a large portion of the training in Canada. In 2004, a business case was done to establish a Canadian military public affairs training centre.

The DPALC officially opened in May 2006. Upon its establishment, the Centre ran two courses for Canadian Armed Forces members: a four-month Basic Public Affairs Officers Course and the two-week Defence Public Affairs Course (now called the Unit Public Affairs Representative Course). The Defence Public Affairs Course, which was originally established in 1983, is one of the Canadian Armed Forces’ longest running courses.

== Training ==
The DPALC delivers various structured, standardized and bilingual (French and English) training programs both in-house and through distance learning and varying in length from one day to one year. The Centre trains Regular and Reserve Force Public Affairs Officers, Unit Public Affairs Representatives, military and civilian executive-level spokespeople, social media practitioners, military imagery technicians and other external and international partners.

The DPALC's main courses are:

- Basic Public Affairs Officer Course
- Reserve Basic Public Affairs Officer Course
- Public Affairs Non-Commissioned Members Course
- Unit Public Affairs Representative Course
- Social Media Primer
- Designated Spokesperson Training

The DPALC also provides public affairs training to allied nations through the Directorate - Military Training & Cooperation and supports the Canadian Forces College in Toronto, the National Security Program and the Joint Command and Staff Program.

Training programs cover a wide range of topics, including public affairs planning, communications products and tools, journalism and media studies, media relations, crisis communications, public affairs in an operational setting, community relations, issues management, standard operating procedures, internal communications, video production, photojournalism, new media and social media, environmental analysis, public affairs policy, resource management, strategic communications and event planning.

== Facilities & Staff ==
The Centre is currently located in Gatineau, Quebec in the historic National Printing Bureau building. Facilities include three large classrooms, several breakout rooms, two television studios, two radio studios, editing suites, a control room, a small library, two kitchens and offices. The Centre is headed by a lieutenant-colonel or commander who commands a staff of about 25 military and civilian personnel.
