= Maloney Boulevard =

Boulevard Maloney
- Quebec Route 148
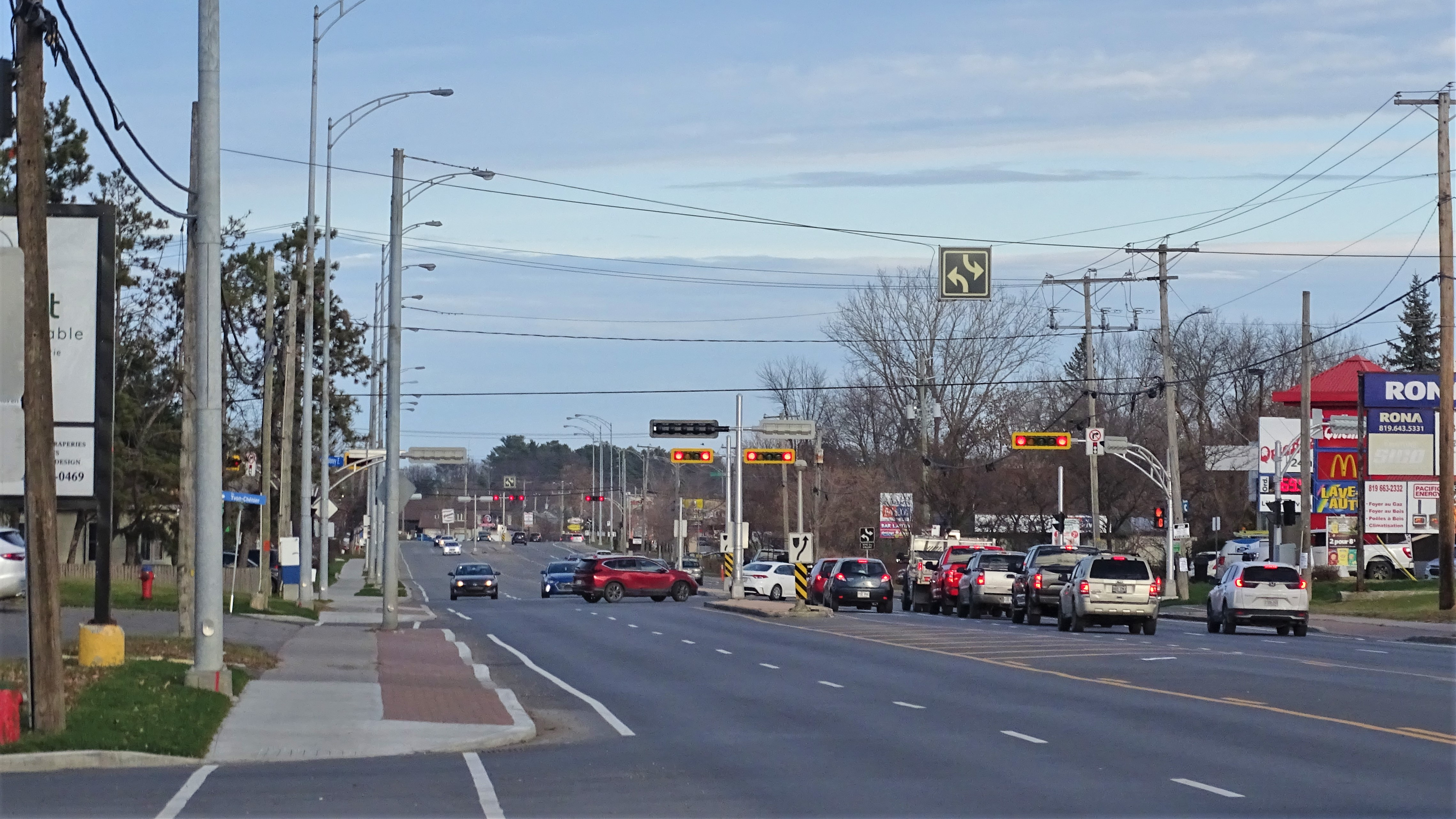
- Boulevard Maloney East looking east towards Boulevard Lorraine
- Maintained by: Transports Québec
- Length: 9.5 mi (15.3 km)
- From: Autoroute 50
- To: Chemin de Montréal Ouest

Boulevard Maloney is one of Gatineau's main commercial roads. It starts at Autoroute 50 via an incomplete interchange and ends at the boundary with the former city of Masson-Angers. It is also known as Route 148. However, one may notice a blue shield sign of the highway on the westbound lane at Boulevard Gréber even if it is not the highway itself as the western portion previous terminated at Maloney before more extensions (as a by-pass for the Gatineau sector) towards Masson-Angers were made in 1986 (and eventually the connection with the eastern segment in Lachute in 2010). Route 148 continues further east through Buckingham towards Laval. Prior to the construction of A-50, was the main roadway through the urban community towards Montreal, the Papineau region and the Laurentides.

== East/West arterial ==
This road has a western section called Boulevard Maloney Ouest and an eastern called Boulevard Maloney Est. Rue Main is the dividing arterial of the Ouest-Est section. Addresses are climbing towards the west and towards the east of this street.

== Features ==
Most of the road is filled with numerous big-box stores, strip malls or other commercial businesses. Near Boulevard Gréber in the western end of this road is Les Promenades Gatineau, the National Capital Region's second largest shopping mall which is home to Simons, Librarie Renaud-Bray, Sports Experts, Costco, Hudson's Bay and many more stores. There are other small malls, big box stores, and strip plazas all along the road. Stores in the vicinity include SuperC, Walmart, Canadian Tire, Provigo, Metro, Jean Coutu, Simons, Winners, The Bay, Costco, Maxi, Uniprix, Toys "R" Us, Best Buy, Brault et Martineau, Linen Chest, The Home Depot & Bureau en Gros.

The route is also home to several car dealerships such as Ford, Chevrolet, Toyota & Chrysler. It also has a cinema theater called Cinema 9 along with a Nickel’s restaurant.

There is an important pulp and paper mill owned by Resolute Forest Products located at the crossing of Boulevard Maloney and Rue Main.

The Centre Sportif de Gatineau opened in early 2010 near the Felix-Leclerc campus of the Cégep de l'Outaouais. The complex was planned several years before but various issues and delays pushed back the project.

== Speed Limits ==
The speed limit on this road is mostly 70 km/h (43 mph) with 4 lanes of traffic. There are some sections with a speed limit of 50 km/h (31 mph), while at its eastern end the speed limit jumps to 90 km/h (50 mph) as it enters a rural area between the former cities of Gatineau and Masson-Angers.

== Commuter Route ==
The route itself is one of the most important commuter routes in the old city of Gatineau as it links one end of the sector to another. Communities located alongside the route include Les Promenades, Saint-Richard (near Montee Paiement), Saint-Maria Goretti (near Labrosse) and Cheval Blanc (near Lorrain).

It also provides easy access to Highway 50 towards downtown Gatineau and Ottawa. Due to the importance of this route, traffic tie-ups and congestion can occur particularly near the access to the 50.

== Rapibus ==
Rapibus, STO's bus rapit transit system, travels parallel to the railroad right of way that is located on the north side of this road, before diverging just east of Montée Paiement. Construction was completed in 2013. De La Gappe, Les Promenades, De La Cité stations can all be found along Boulevard Maloney.

== Neighbourhoods ==
- Touraine
- Le Baron/Du Barry
- Pointe-Gatineau
- Le Carrefour
- De l'Hôpital
- Tecumseh
- Saint-Richard
- Notre-Dame/Ste-Maria Goretti
- Achbar
- Lorrain/Cheval Blanc
- La Sablonnière

== See also ==
- List of Gatineau roads
