= Collège Nouvelles-Frontières =

Private high school in Gatineau, Québec, Canada

Location
- 250 Rue Gamelin; Gatineau, Quebec, J8Y 1W9; Canada
- Coordinates: 45°26′37″N 75°44′56″W

Information
- School type: Private High School
- Motto: Créateur de passions
- Established: c. 1997-1998
- Status: Open
- Director: Roxane Saumier
- Grades: Grades 7 to 12
- Gender: Mixed
- Language: French
- Team name: Arsenal
- Website: https://collegenf.ca

Collège Nouvelles-Frontières is a private secondary school, founded in 1998, located in the Outaouais region, in the province of Quebec, Canada. It is located on Rue de Gamelin near the Hull Hospital.

== History ==
Due to demand from parents in Collège Saint-Alexandre since 1992, the school was originally founded in 1997 as Collège préuniversitaire Saint-Alexandre to give students preuniversitary classes. In October 2000, the school rebranded to Collège préuniversitaire Nouvelles-Frontières. Due to big demand for a privatized secondary school in the region, the school administrators decided to start a new secondary section in the school. They moved inside the old D'Arcy McGee school and the college section has moved to another address.

In 2013, the school has become part of the schools in the region to adopt the educational use of the iPad in school hours. In 2022, it invested into expanding the school.
