= Winterlude =

Annual winter festival held in Ottawa, Ontario and Gatineau, Quebec

Coordinates: 45.42°N 75.69°W

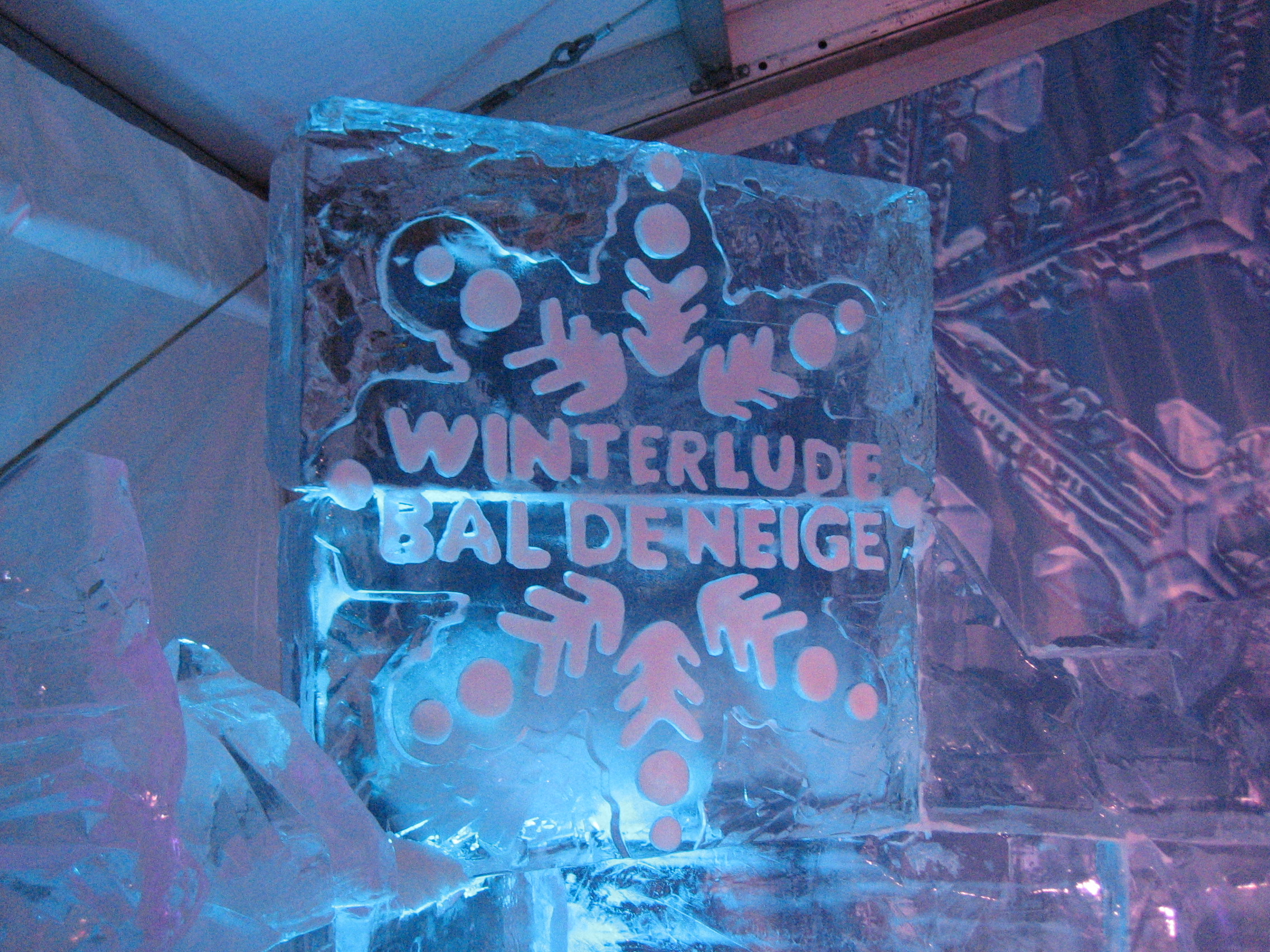
- An ice sculpture bearing the Winterlude logo.
- Genre: Winter festival
- Frequency: Annually
- Venue: Confederation Park; Jacques Cartier Park; Rideau Canal Skateway
- Locations: Ottawa, Ontario; Gatineau, Quebec
- Country: Canada
- Inaugurated: 1979
- Previous event: January 30 – February 16, 2026
- Next event: January – February, 2027 (dates TBD)
- Organiser: Canadian Heritage
- Website: Winterlude

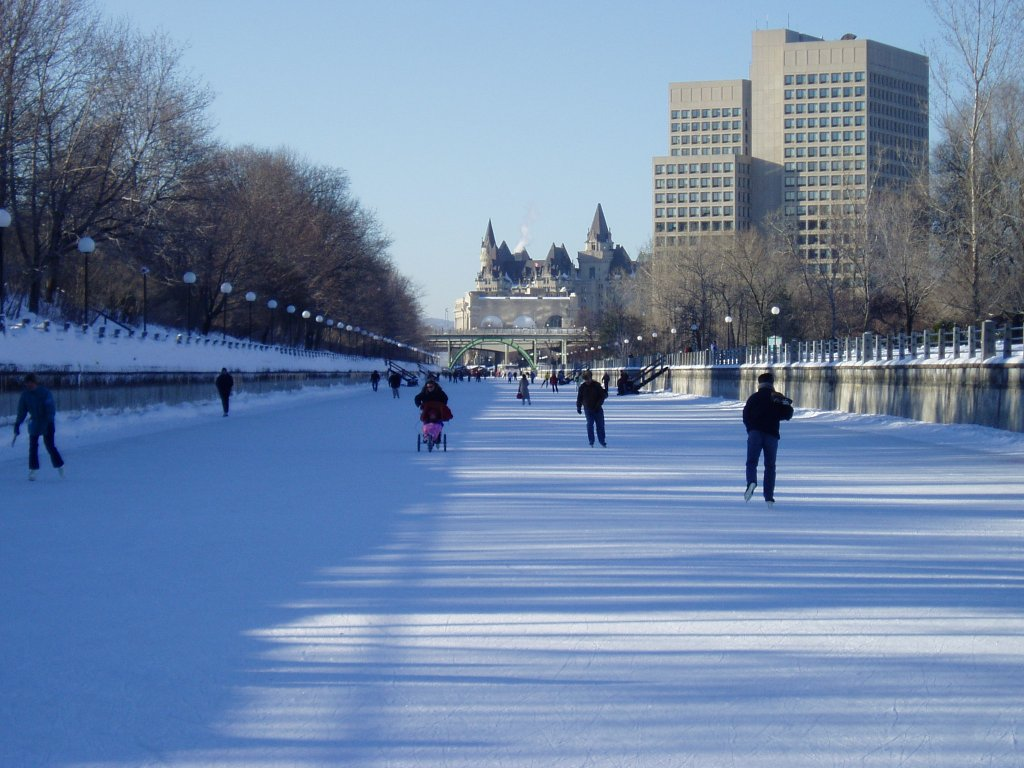
People ice skating on the Rideau Canal in Ottawa, January 2005.

Winterlude is an annual winter festival held in Ottawa, Ontario and Gatineau, Quebec (collectively known as the National Capital Region).

Winterlude is run by the Department of Canadian Heritage and was started in 1979. The event is one of Ottawa's most important tourist draws, attracting hundreds of thousands of visitors each year. In 2007, it set a new attendance record of estimated 1.6 million visits to one of the four Winterlude sites, and that record still stands as of 2024. BizBash has recognized Winterlude as one of the top 100 annual attractions in Canada and the United States.

== Activities ==
=== Attractions ===
The focal point of Winterlude is the Rideau Canal Skateway which at 7.8 kilometres (approximately 5 miles) is the largest skating rink in the world.

Another primary site is the Snowflake Kingdom, which is located in Jacques-Cartier Park in Gatineau. This site is turned into a massive "snow park" with ice slides and snow sculptures and also hosts numerous events and activities for children.

Confederation Park, better known as Crystal Garden, is the site for the ice sculpture competition, the ice lounge and musical concerts. Marion Dewar Plaza at City Hall (across from Confederation Park) is the site of the Rink of Dreams, an ice-skating rink that hosts skating shows, DJ dance parties and interactive art displays throughout the Festival. Dow's Lake also has a large skating area and hosts various activities.

Related activities include special exhibits at numerous Ottawa museums, special events in the ByWard Market, Sparks Street, and a variety of other events throughout the city.

The festival features mascots called "Ice Hogs," fictional groundhog-like creatures. Legend has it they emerged during the last Ice Age from a magical ice vortex. Their presence brings a touch of magic to Winterlude, delighting both young and old who appreciate the winter season.

Corridas Several racing events are held in conjunction with Winterlude. The Gatineau Loppet, inaugurated in 1979, is an internationally recognized cross-country ski race that takes place in Gatineau Park. The event also holds snowshoe and Fatbike races. Since 1984, the Winterlude Triathlon has also been part of the festival. The format and location of the winter triathlon has changed frequently over the years. The race currently consists of a 8 km skate across the Rideau Canal, a 5 km run along Colonel By Drive, and a 6 km ski at Mooney's Bay Park. Other race events include "bed racing" and "ice dragon boat" racing.

== Duration ==
Winterlude spans three weekends, usually in February, and typically concludes on Family Day, which falls on a Monday. Between the first and second weekends, and the second and third weekends, there are very few events scheduled from Monday to Thursday. This results in a less crowded skating rink and pristine ice conditions, with only around a thousand skaters sharing it compared to larger numbers on weekends. Skate changing shacks and food catering kiosks along the skateway remain open during the weekdays.

The weather in Ottawa is notoriously unpredictable, and Winterlude often is hampered by warm temperatures. Mild weather is the bane of the Canal, as proper ice conditions require -10 °C/14 °F for proper freezing. The length of the skating season (which often extends past Winterlude) is therefore unpredictable. However, most events are usually not affected other than premature melting of ice and snow sculptures. The average length to which the canal is open for skating is 50 days, but varies greatly. In the 2001–2002 season there was a (then) record low 34 days of skating. The very next season, 2002–2003, the canal was open for a near-record high 72 days. The longest skating season was 1971–1972, lasting 95 days. The shortest (excluding the 2022–2023 season in which the canal did not open at all) was 2023–2024, lasting just 10 days. However, the very next season lasted 52 days, again showing the unpredictable nature of the climate.

== Gallery ==
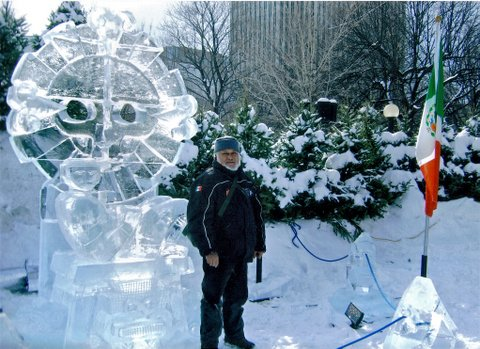
Mexican ice sculptor Abel Ramírez Águilar with his creation.

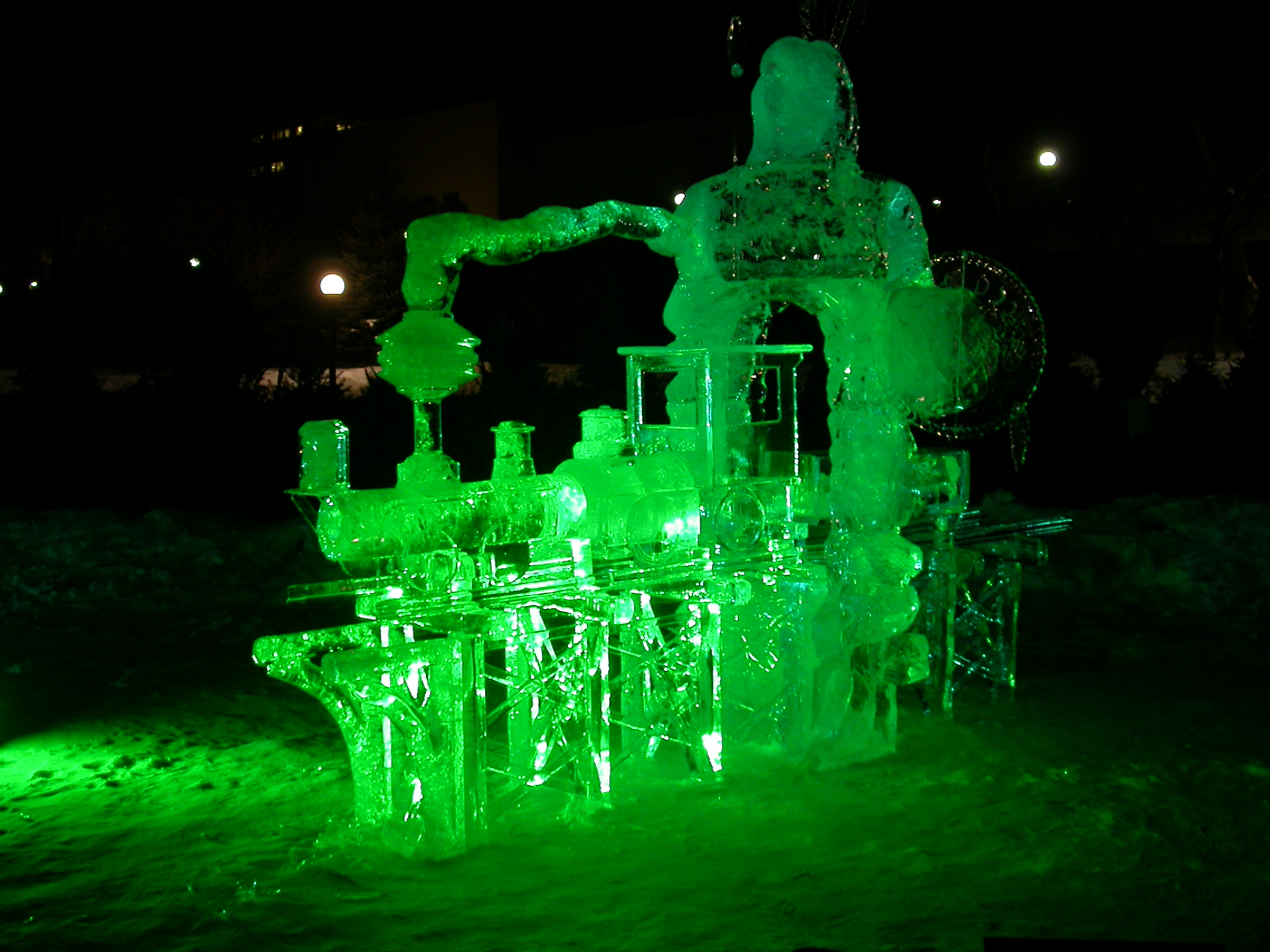
Confederation Park ice sculptures lit nightly.

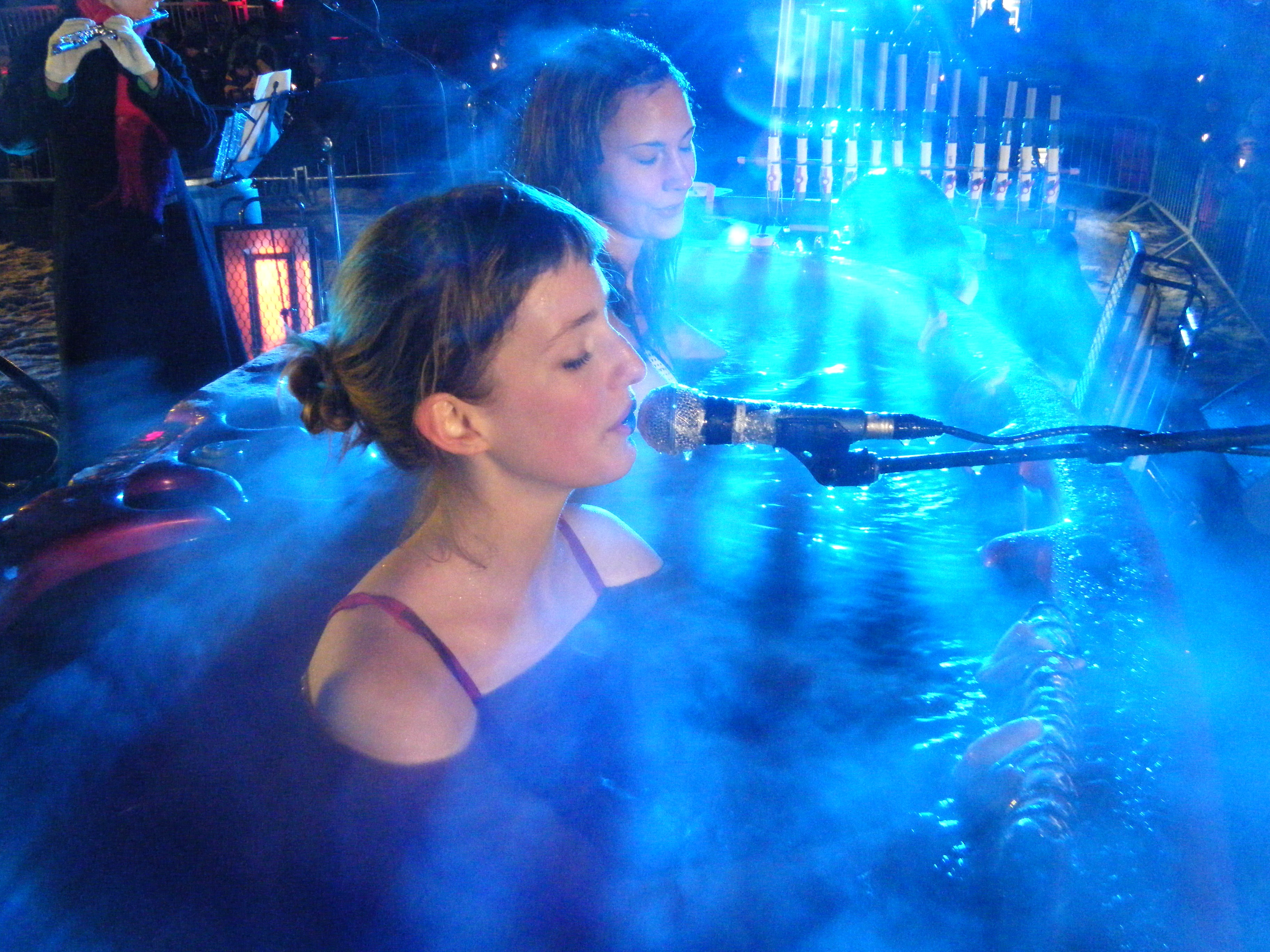
H2Orchestra performs outside Canadian Museum of Civilization.

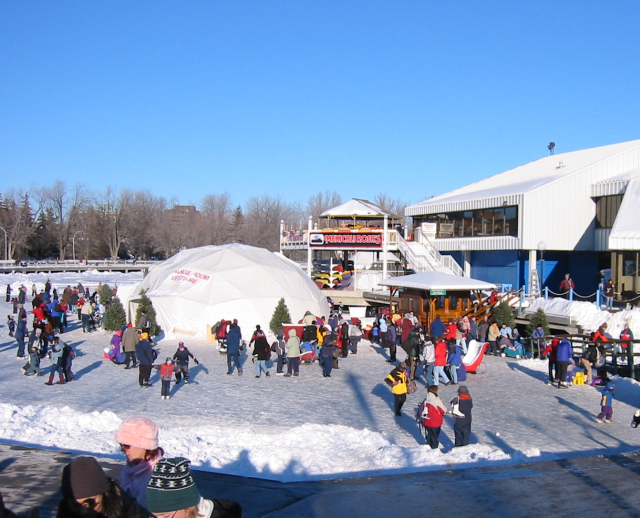
Skating at Dow's Lake.

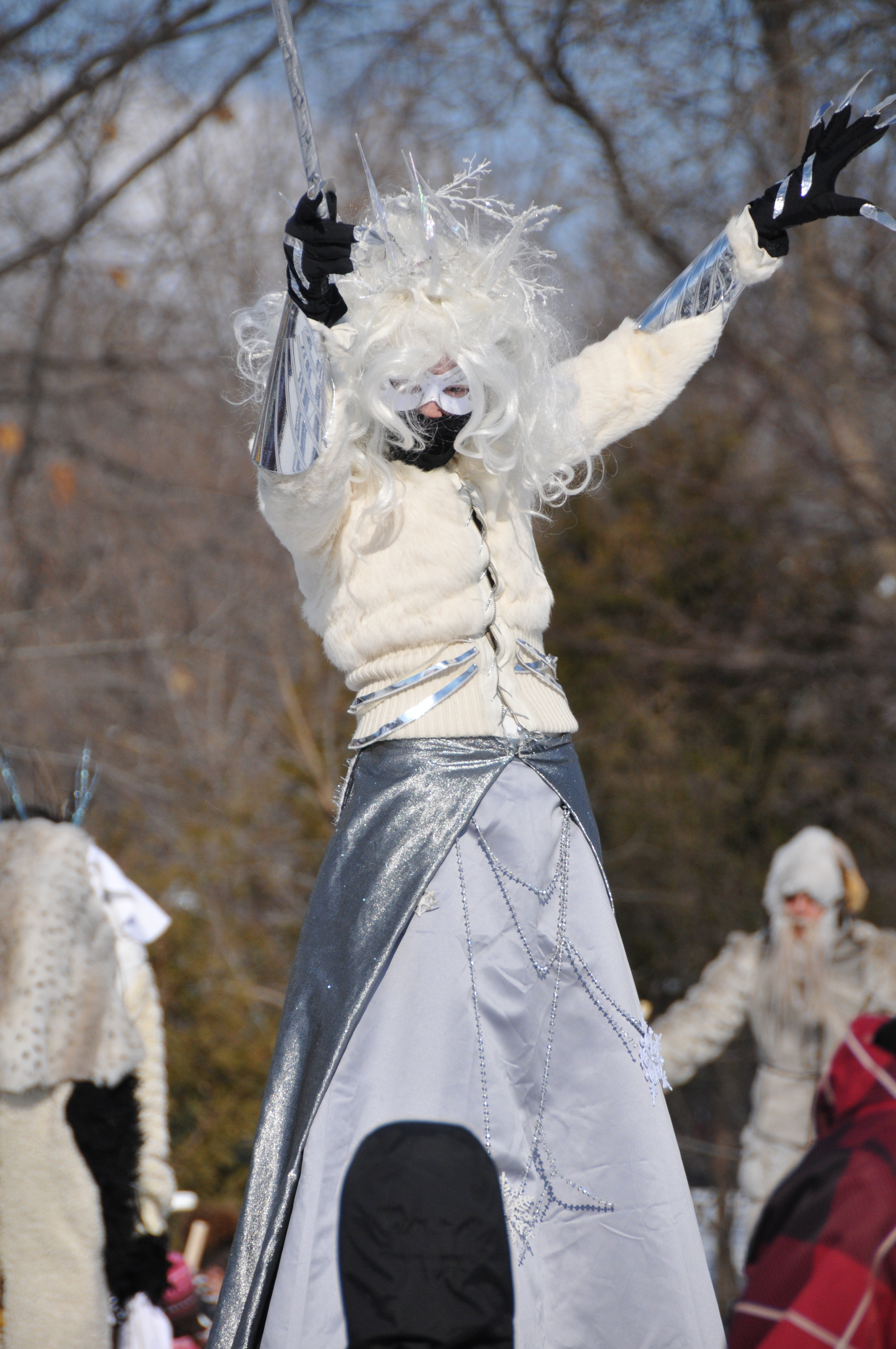
Stilt performance at Jacques-Cartier Park.

== See also ==
- Winter festival
