= Gatineau =

- City
- Ville de Gatineau
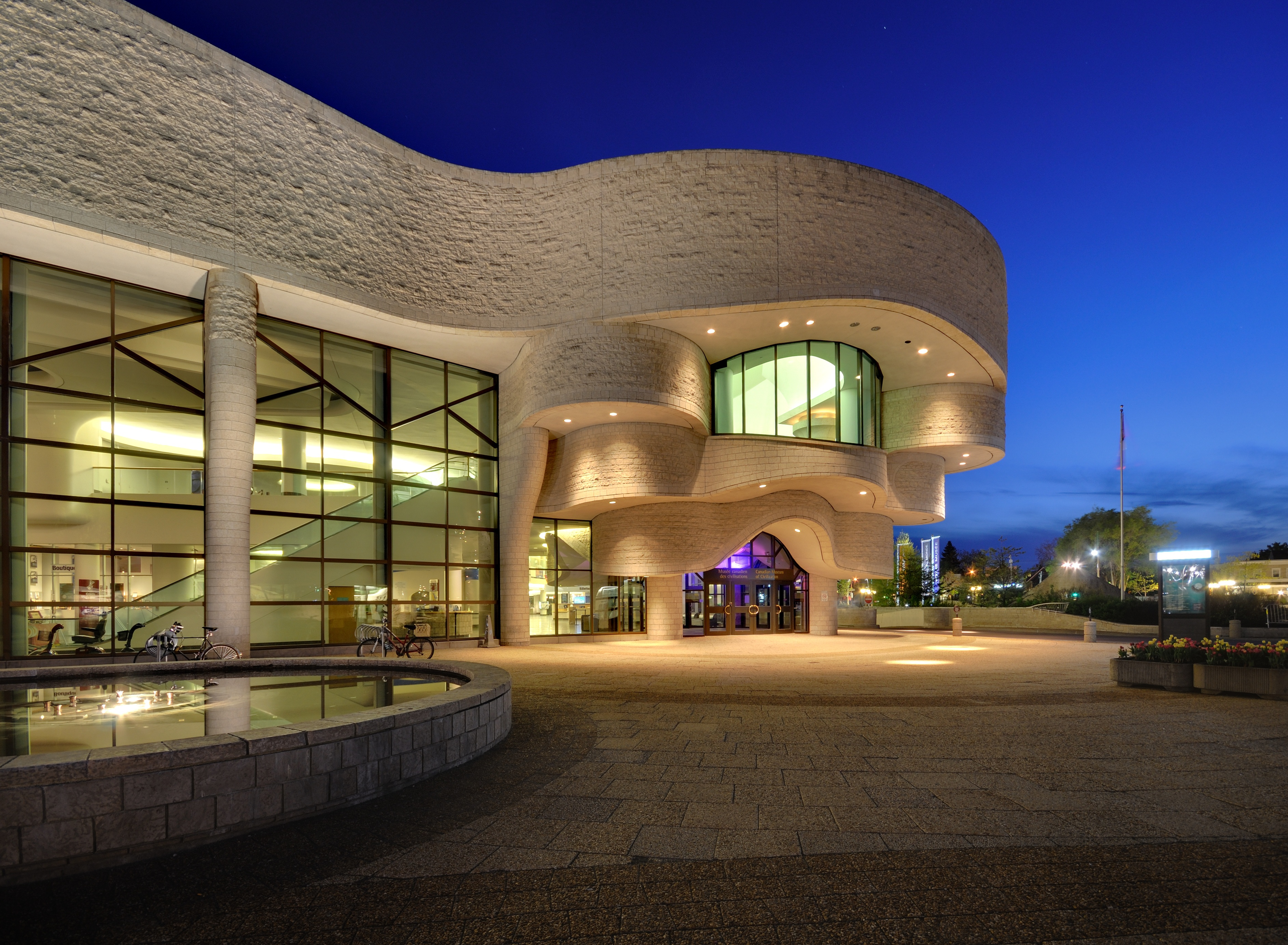
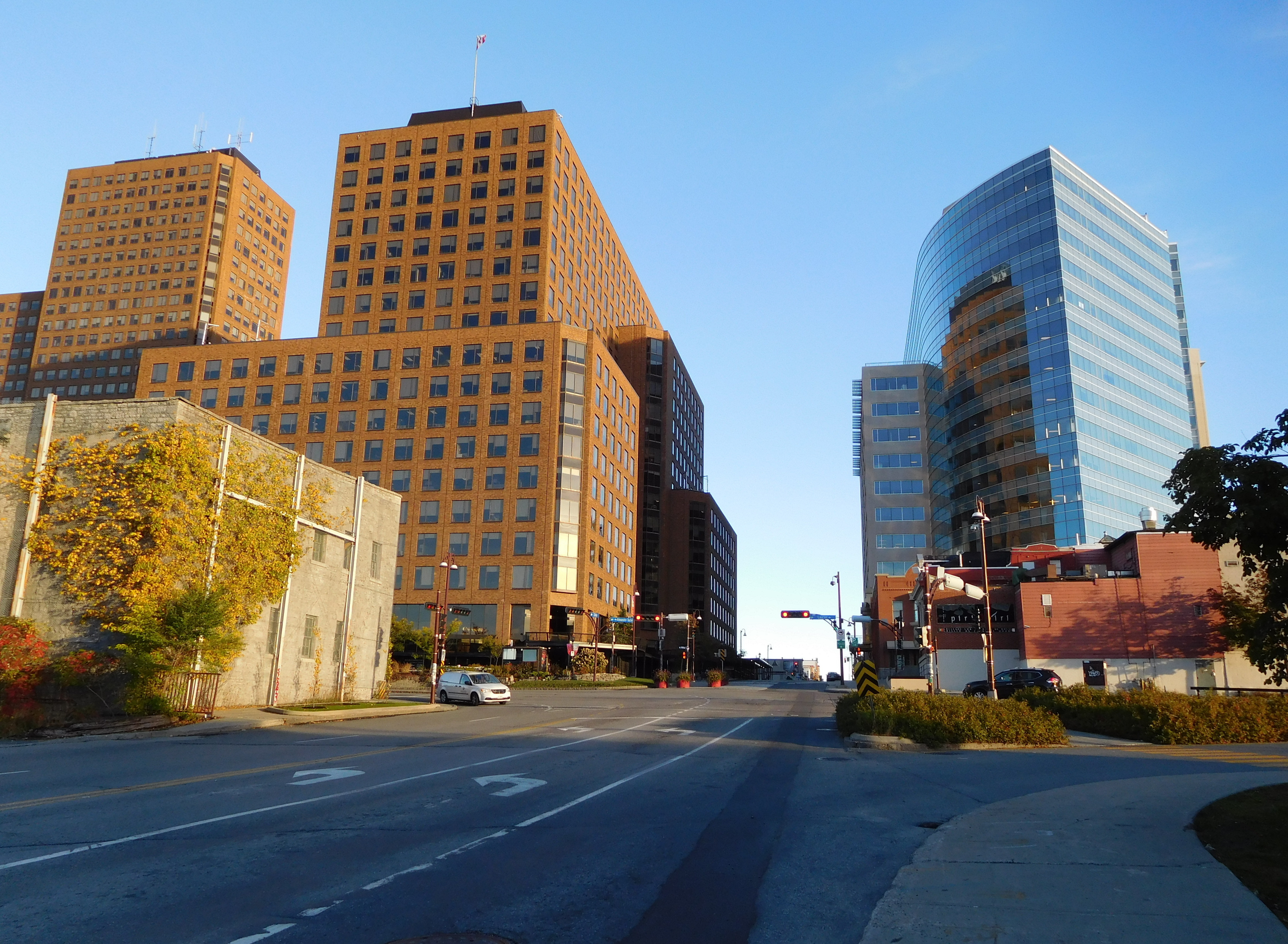
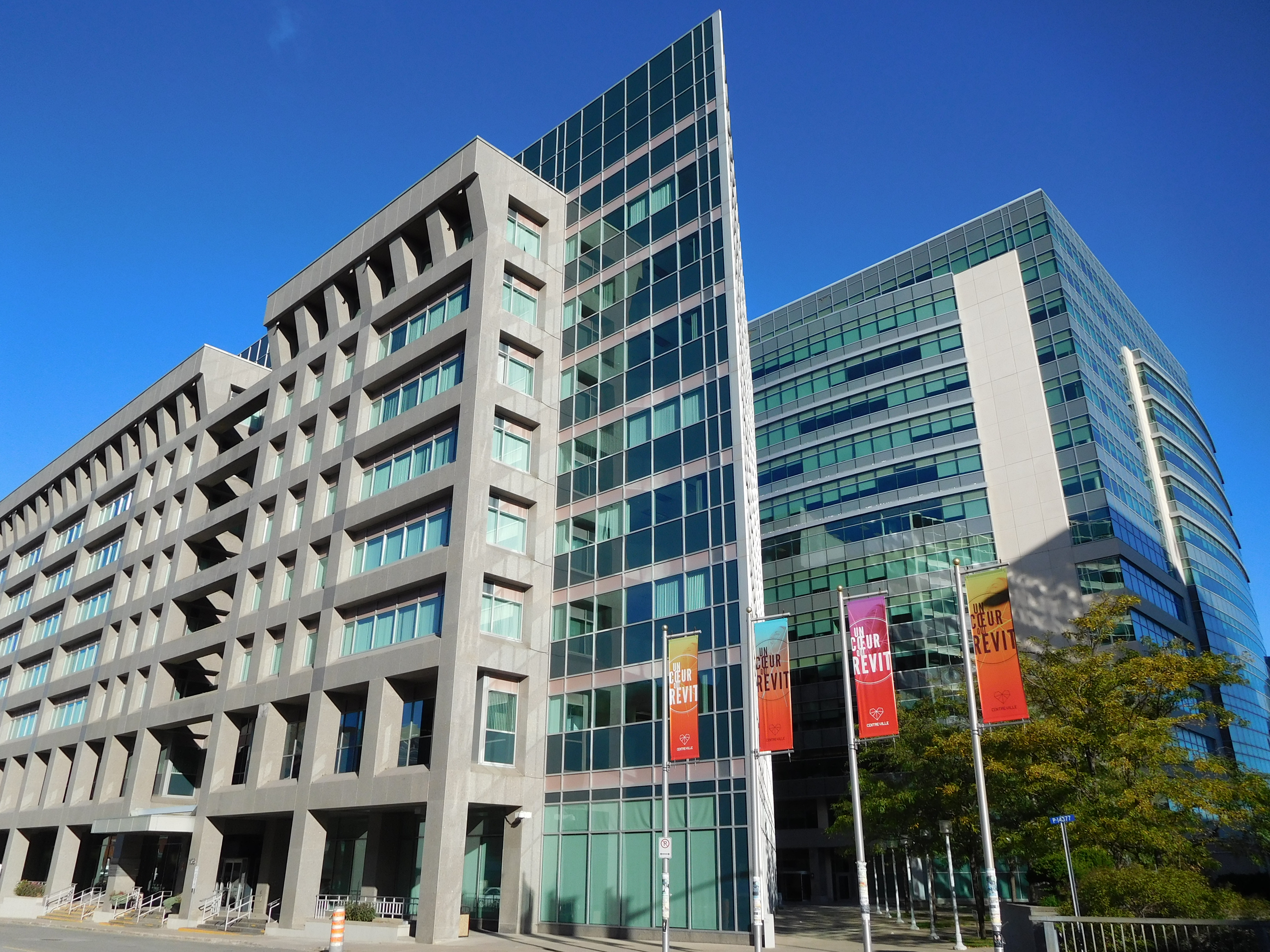
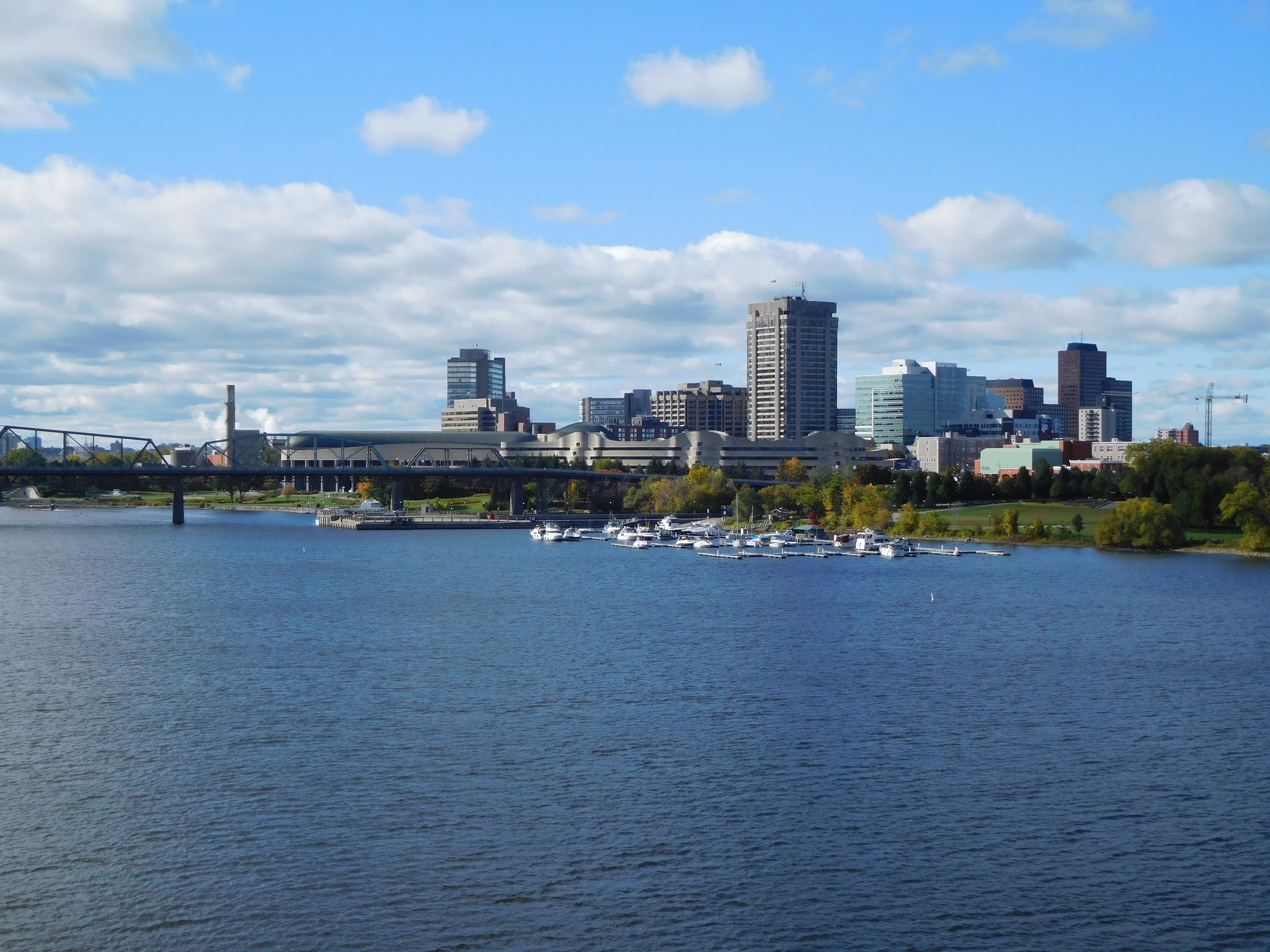
- Clockwise from top left: Canadian Museum of History, downtown, Ottawa River, Macdonald-Cartier Bridge, and Rue de l'Hôtel-de-Ville.

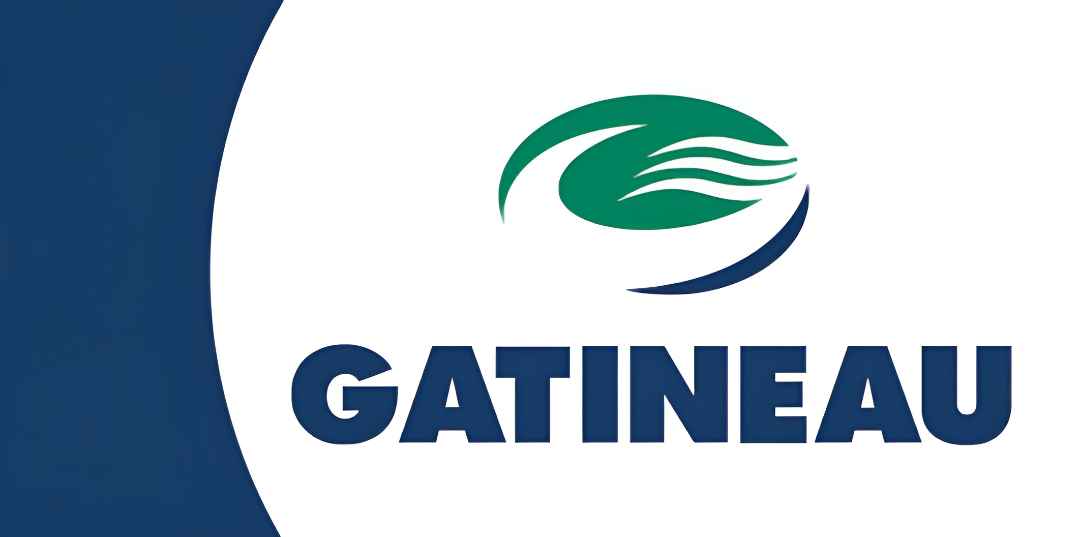
- Flag Logo
- Nickname: G-town
- Motto(s): Fortunae meae, multorum faber ("Maker of my fate and that of many others")
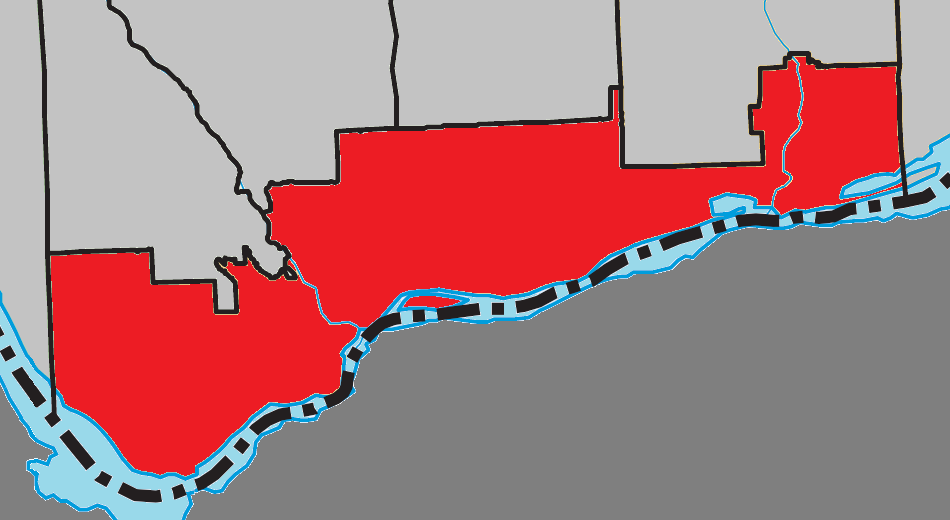
- Location of Gatineau (red) with adjacent municipalities

- Location of Gatineau in Quebec
- Coordinates: 45°29′N 75°39′W
- Country: Canada
- Province: Quebec
- Region: Outaouais
- RCM: None
- Established: 1806
- Constituted: 1 January 2002

Government
  - Type: Gatineau City Council
  - Mayor: Maude Marquis-Bissonnette
  - Federal riding: Gatineau / Hull—Aylmer / Pontiac—Kitigan Zibi / Argenteuil—La Petite-Nation
  - Prov. riding: Chapleau / Gatineau / Hull / Papineau / Pontiac

Area
  - City: 381.30 km^{2} (147.22 sq mi)
  - Land: 341.84 km^{2} (131.99 sq mi)
  - Urban: 549.49 km^{2} (212.16 sq mi)
  - Metro: 8,046.99 km^{2} (3,106.96 sq mi)

Population (2025)
  - City: 300,045 (18th)
  - Density: 851.4/km^{2} (2,205/sq mi)
  - Urban: 1,068,821 (6th)
  - Urban density: 1,945.1/km^{2} (5,038/sq mi)
  - Metro: 1,488,307 (4th)
  - Metro density: 185/km^{2} (480/sq mi)
  - Pop 2011–2016: ▲5.4%
  - Dwellings: 125,608
- Time zone: UTC−5 (EST)
  - Summer (DST): UTC−4 (EDT)
- Postal code(s): J8L, J8M, J8P, J8R, J8T, J8V, J8X to J8Z, J9A, J9H to J9J, various K1A (Government Offices)
- Area codes: 819, 873, 468
- GDP Per Capita: CAD$ 38 079 (2018)
- Website: www.gatineau.ca

Gatineau (/ˈɡætɪnoʊ/ GAT-in-oh; French: [ɡatino]) is a city in southwestern Quebec, Canada. It is located on the northern bank of the Ottawa River, directly across from Ottawa, Ontario. Gatineau is the largest city in the Outaouais administrative region of Quebec and is also part of Canada's National Capital Region. As of 2021, Gatineau is the fourth-largest city in Quebec with a population of 291,041. Gatineau is also part of the Ottawa-Gatineau census metropolitan area with a population of 1,488,307, making it the fourth largest in Canada.

Gatineau is coextensive with a territory equivalent to a regional county municipality (TE) and census division (CD) of the same name, whose geographical code is 81. It is the seat of the judicial district of Hull.

It is also the most bilingual (French-English) city in Canada.

== Toponomy ==
In 1613, during his first passage on the Ottawa River, the great explorer Samuel de Champlain was the first European to speak of "the river that comes from the north", traveled for millennia by Aboriginals; de Champlain did not name it. In 1721, Canadian surveyor Noël Beaupré recorded the river; Beaupré also did not give it a name. In short, the name Gatineau was not used in New France.

In fact, it was not until 1783 that the river was mentioned as Lettinoe in a report by Lieutenant David Jones to the Governor of Quebec, Sir Frederic Haldimand. In 1817, a map by Theodore Davis shows Gatteno, a name taken up with Gatino, Gateno and Gattino on plans by Philemon Wright, the founder of Hull Township, and by Lieutenant-Colonel John By, the engineer responsible for building the Rideau Canal.

It was not until 1821 that the name Gatineau first appeared on a map of Nepean Township, Ontario. The same name appears again on William Henderson's map of 1831, and on another drawn 30 years later by surveyor Thomas Devine. Thereafter, the river was always referred to as the Gatineau.

There are two hypotheses to explain the origin of the city's name. It would be either of Indigenous origin or of French origin:

1. The name of the river and the city would come from the Anishinaabemowin (language of the Algonquin Anishinaabeg) Tenagatino Zibi, according to the elders of Kitigan Zibi.
2. In his 1889 article published in the Echo de la Gatineau, Benjamin Sulte wrote: "One hundred years ago, the Gatineau family was extinct, or thereabouts; it is hardly likely that we waited for its disappearance to consecrate the memory of the three or four fur traders it produced. The custom must have been established during the lifetime of these men, and because they traded in these places. Of the latter fact, for instance, I am not certain." In his own words, Sulte writes that he is creating a myth and that the story that the Gatineau family gave the river its name is a myth, invented by Sulte himself. According to Sulte, the name Gatineau comes from the Gastineau family - not Gatineau - one of its members, Nicolas Gastineau sieur Duplessis (1627-1689).

== History ==
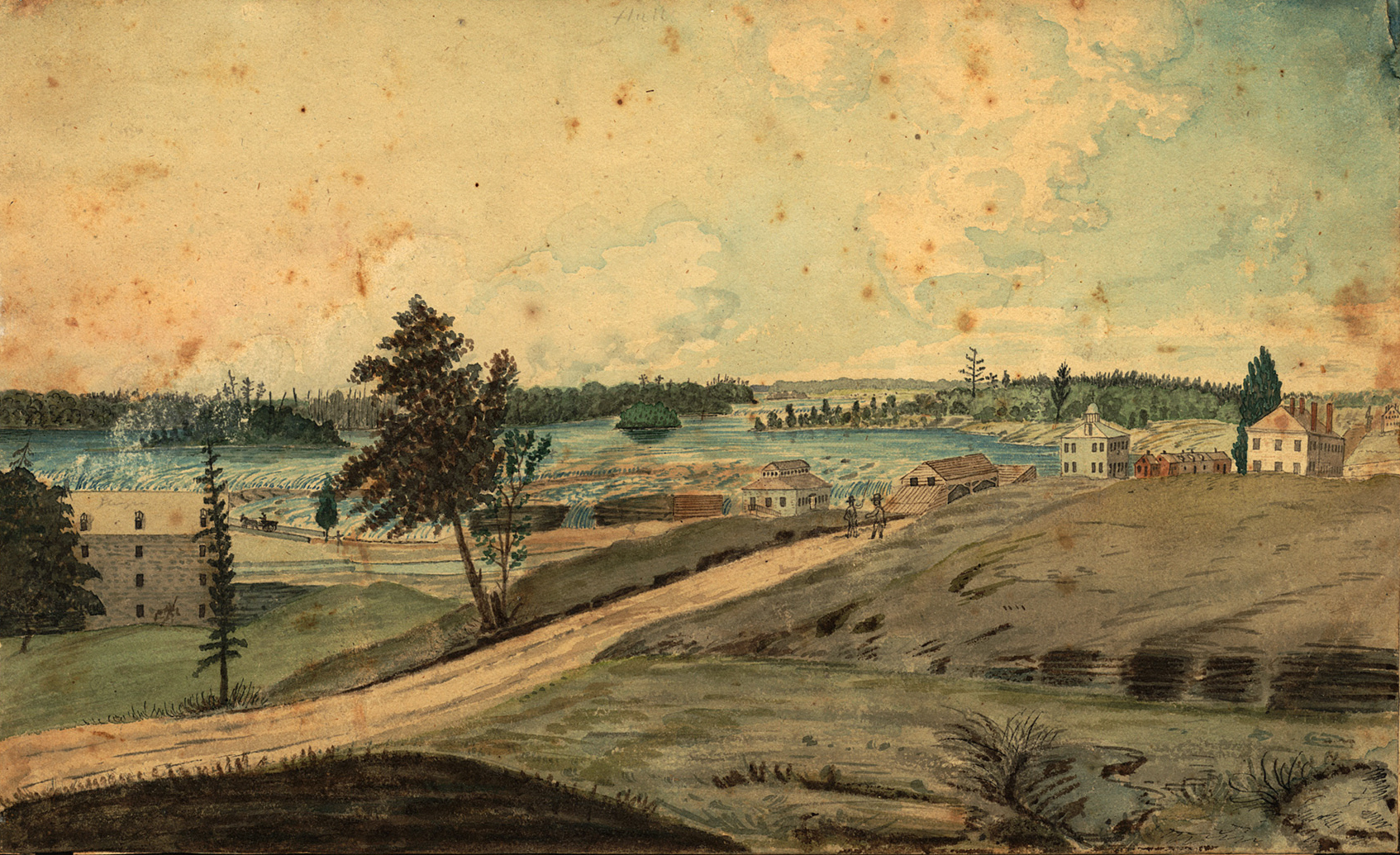
Hull (Lower Canada) on the Ottawa River; at the Chaudier [sic] Falls, 1830, by Thomas Burrowes. Chaudière Falls and Bytown are visible in the background.

Prior to European settlement, the Gatineau area was inhabited by the Algonquin people which is part of the larger Anishinaabe. The current city of Gatineau is centred on an area formerly called Hull. It is the oldest European colonial settlement in the National Capital Region, but this area was essentially not developed by Europeans until after the American Revolutionary War, when the Crown granted land through the Leaders and Associates program of the Lower Canada Executive, which brought settlement in the Ottawa Valley.

Hull was founded on the north shore of the Ottawa River in 1800 by Philemon Wright at the portage around the Chaudière Falls, just upstream (or west) from the confluence of the Gatineau and Rideau rivers with the Ottawa River. Wright brought his family, four other families, and 25 (or 33, according to Philemon's own conflicting reports) labourers with the hope of establishing an agricultural community. However, by 1806, Wright and his family took advantage of the large forest stands and began the Ottawa River timber trade, floating the first square timber raft down the Ottawa River to Québec City. For a while, the industry was under a monopoly known as the Gatineau Privilege. The original settlement was called Wright's Town, Lower Canada, and was later renamed as Hull, when it was incorporated in 1875. Bytown, founded in 1832, stood across the river from Wright's Town. In 2002, after amalgamation, Hull became part of a larger jurisdiction named the City of Gatineau.

In 1820, before immigrants from Ireland and Great Britain arrived in great numbers, Hull Township had a population of 707; these included 365 men, 113 women, and 229 children. The high number of men were related to workers in the lumber trade. In 1824, there were 106 families and 803 persons. During the rest of the 1820s, the population of Hull doubled, with the arrival of Protestant immigrants from Ulster, now Northern Ireland. By 1851, the population of the County of Ottawa was 11,104, of which 2,811 lived in Hull. By comparison, Bytown had a population of 7,760 in 1851. By 1861, Ottawa County had a population of 15,671, of which 3,711 lived in Hull.

Gradually, French Canadians also migrated to the township; their proportion of the population increased from 10% in 1850, to 50% in 1870, and 90% in 1920. Industrial development in the mid-19th century attracted large numbers of French-Canadian workers to Hull.

The Gatineau River, like the Ottawa River, was a basic transportation resource for the draveurs, timber rafters who transported logs via the rivers from lumber camps to downriver destinations. (The Gatineau River flows south into the Ottawa River, which flows east to the St. Lawrence River near Montreal.) The log-filled Ottawa River, as viewed from Hull, was featured on the back of the Canadian one-dollar bill; the paper money was replaced by a dollar coin (the "loonie") in 1987. The last of the dwindling activity of the draveurs on these rivers ended a few years later.

Very little remains of the original 1800 settlement of Hull because the oldest sectors of the town were destroyed by several fires, especially the destructive fire in 1900. The fire also seriously damaged the pont des Chaudières (Chaudière Bridge), but the bridge was rebuilt to join Ottawa to Hull at Victoria Island.

In the 1940s, during World War II, Hull, along with various other regions within Canada, such as Saguenay–Lac-Saint-Jean, and Île Sainte-Hélène, was the site of prisoner-of-war camps. Hull's prison was identified only by a number, as were Canada's other war prisons. The prisoners of war (POWs) were organized by nationality and status: civilian or military status. In the Hull camp, POWs were mostly Italian and German nationals who were detained by the government as potential threats to the nation during the war. As a result of the Conscription Crisis of 1944, Canadians who had refused conscription were also interned in the camp. The prisoners were required to perform hard labour, which included farming and lumbering the land.

During the 1970s and early 1980s, the decaying old downtown core of Hull was redeveloped. Old buildings were demolished and replaced by a series of large office complexes. In addition, some 4,000 residents were displaced, and many businesses uprooted along what was once the town's main commercial area.

On 11 November 1992, Ghislaine Chénier, Mayor by interim for the city of Hull, unveiled War Never Again, a marble stele monument that commemorates the cost of war for the men, women and children of Hull.

== Geography ==
Gatineau is located in southwestern Quebec, on the northern bank of the Ottawa River. It is situated at an elevation of around 50 metres (160 feet) The Gatineau Hills are the foothills of the Laurentian Mountains and located in the region. It is also the location of the third largest urban park in the world. They supply great skiing and snowboarding opportunities within minutes of the city. Gatineau is situated close to where the Canadian Shield and the Saint Lawrence Lowlands intersect. The area has several major fault lines and small earthquakes do occur somewhat regularly, on average, there are at least one earthquake of intensity III or higher once every three years in Ottawa-Gatineau. The most memorable being the 2010 Central Canada earthquake that occurred in Quebec. The epicentre was situated approximately 56 kilometres (35 miles) north of Ottawa, Ontario, in the municipality of Val-des-Bois, Quebec.

The city has numerous parks and green spaces. Gatineau Park, which occupies almost 360 square kilometers of forest, has beaches and facilities for hiking, biking and cross-country skiing. The Ottawa and Gatineau Rivers flow through Gatineau and Gatineau offers boat rides on the Ottawa River. Gatineau Park has 165 km of pathways and more than 200 km of groomed cross-country ski trails, making it one of the largest trail networks in North America.

=== Hydrography ===
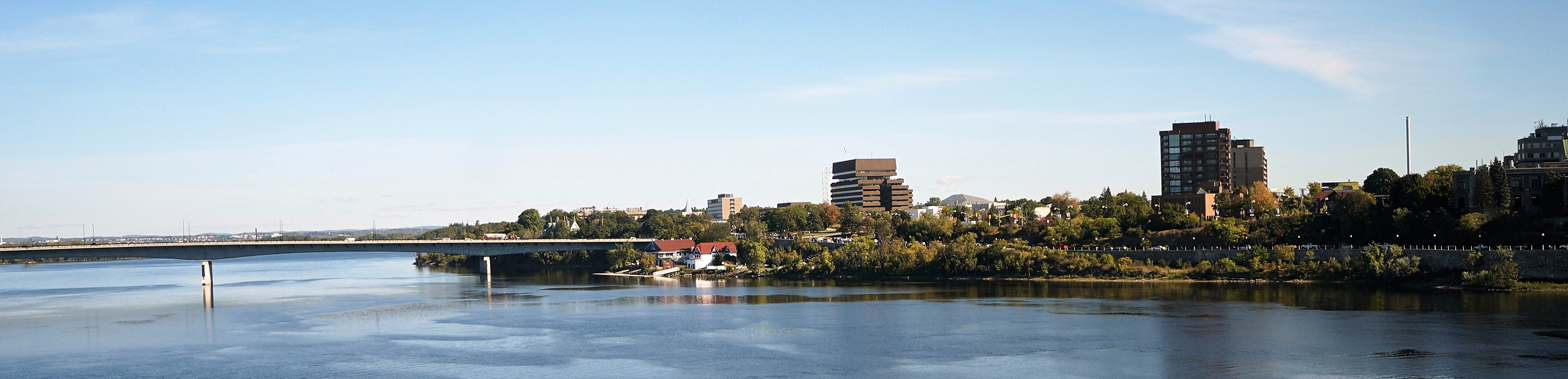
Portage Bridge over the Ottawa River

Gatineau's entire territory is drained by the Ottawa River, the main tributary of the St. Lawrence. The river marks the city's southern boundary. To the southwest, it widens to form Lac Deschênes. The city is also crossed by several rivers: the Gatineau, the Lièvre and the Blanche. The territory is also criss-crossed by a dozen streams, including the ruisseau de la Brasserie, which forms an island in the downtown area.

There are several lakes in Gatineau, the most notable of which are Lac Leamy, Lac Beauchamp, Lac des Fées, Lac de la Carrière and Lac Pink. Pink is one of the few meromictic lakes in North America.

=== Climate ===
Gatineau has a humid continental climate (Köppen Dfb) with four distinct seasons and is between Zones 5a and 5b on the Canadian Plant Hardiness Scale. The climate in Gatineau is cold and temperate. Gatineau receives significant precipitation, even during the driest month. The average temperature in this city is 6.5 °C (43.7 °F).

Summer lasts from the end of June to the end of September. The precipitation peaks in June, with an average of 102 mm. From 21 May to 18 September, the warm season lasts 3.9 months, with an average daily high temperature above 20 °C. July is the hottest month in Gatineau, with average highs of 26 °C and lows of 15 °C.

The cold season lasts 3.2 months, from 3 December to 11 March, with an average daily high temperature of less than 1 degree Celsius. January is the coldest month in Gatineau, with an average low of -15 °C and a high of -5 °C.

Climate Data for Gatineau
| | January | February | March | April | May | June | July | August | September | October | November | December |
|---|---|---|---|---|---|---|---|---|---|---|---|---|
| Avg. Temperature °C (°F) | -9.8 °C (14.3) °F | -8.2 °C (17.2) °F | -2.8 °C (26.9) °F | 5.1 °C (41.1) °F | 13 °C (55.4) °F | 17.9 °C (64.3) °F | 20.8 °C (69.4) °F | 19.9 °C (67.9) °F | 16.2 °C (61.2) °F | 8.9 °C (48) °F | 2.1 °C (35.7) °F | -5.2 °C (22.6) °F |
| Min. Temperature °C (°F) | -14 °C (6.7) °F | -12.5 °C (9.5) °F | -7.1 °C (19.3) °F | 0.5 °C (32.9) °F | 8.1 °C (46.7) °F | 13.4 °C (56.1) °F | 16.5 °C (61.7) °F | 16.1 °C (60.9) °F | 12.5 °C (54.5) °F | 5.9 °C (42.7) °F | -0.5 °C (31.1) °F | -8.3 °C (17) °F |
| Max. Temperature °C (°F) | -5 °C (23.1) °F | -2.9 °C (26.8) °F | 2.4 °C (36.3) °F | 10.6 °C (51.2) °F | 18.5 °C (65.4) °F | 23 °C (73.4) °F | 25.5 °C (78) °F | 24.4 °C (75.9) °F | 20.8 °C (69.4) °F | 12.7 °C (54.9) °F | 5.5 °C (42) °F | -1.5 °C (29.3) °F |
| Precipitation / Rainfall mm (in) | 78 (3) | 63 (2) | 74 (2) | 94 (3) | 92 (3) | 102 (4) | 101 (3) | 92 (3) | 97 (3) | 102 (4) | 87 (3) | 86 (3) |
| Humidity(%) | 76% | 72% | 69% | 63% | 65% | 70% | 70% | 72% | 74% | 75% | 78% | 79% |
| Rainy days (d) | 9 | 7 | 8 | 8 | 9 | 9 | 9 | 8 | 8 | 9 | 9 | 9 |
| avg. Sun hours (hours) | 4.0 | 4.8 | 6.3 | 7.9 | 9.2 | 10.2 | 10.6 | 9.2 | 7.3 | 5.4 | 3.9 | 2.9 |

Data: 1991 - 2021 Min. Temperature °C (°F), Max. Temperature °C (°F), Precipitation / Rainfall mm (in), Humidity, Rainy days. Data: 1999 - 2019: avg. Sun hours

December has the highest relative humidity (78.52%). April is the month with the lowest relative humidity (63.29%). The wettest month is December (12.07 days), while February (9.43 days) is the driest.

=== Metropolitan area ===
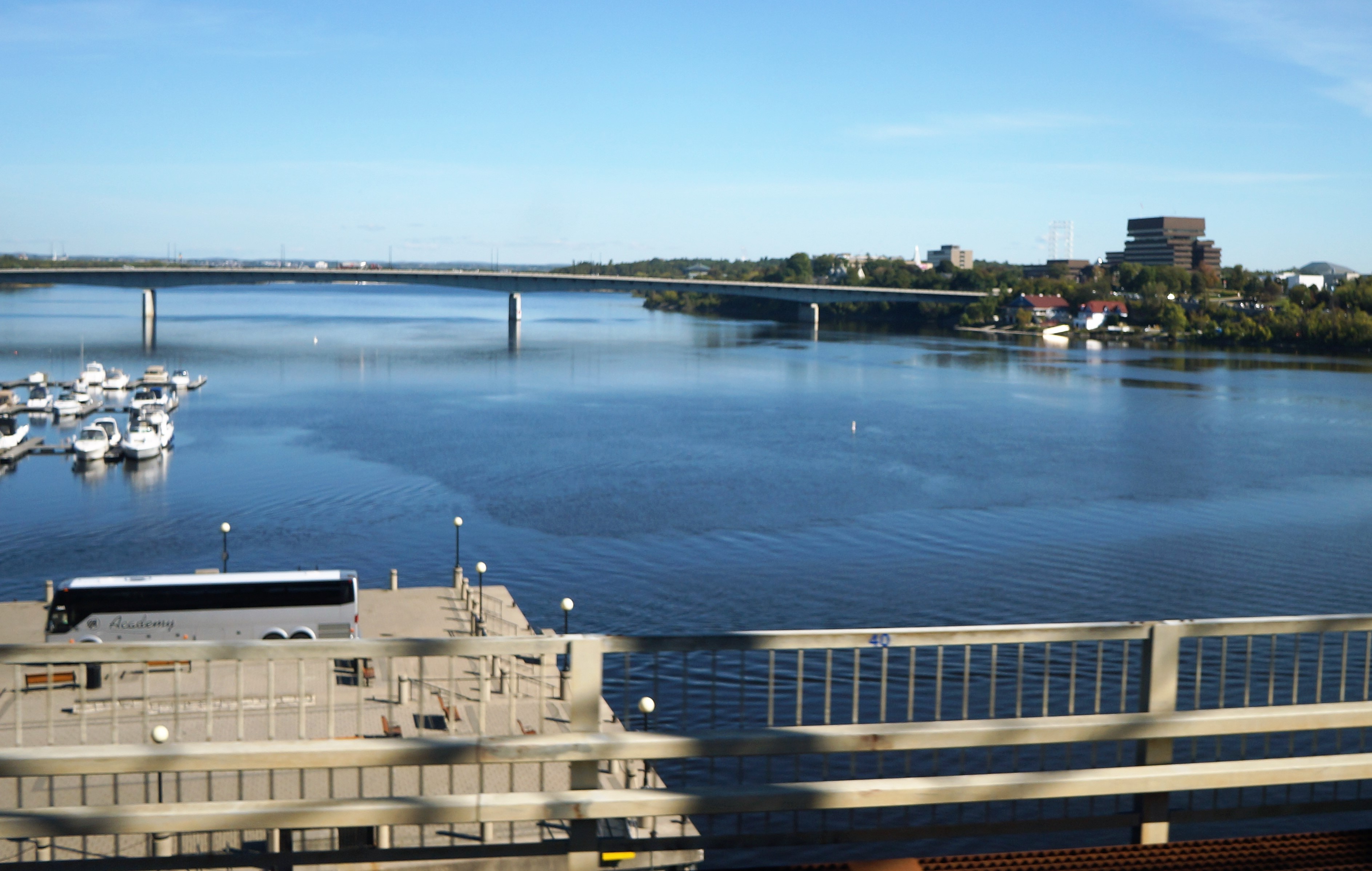
View of Ottawa-Gatineau from the Portage Bridge

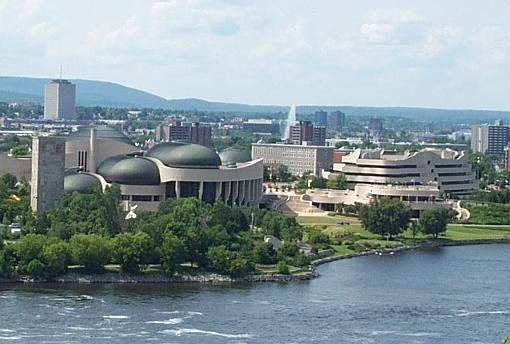
Canadian Museum of History in Gatineau

Gatineau is one of the two major parts of the National Capital Region (Région de la capitale nationale), also known as Canada's Capital Region and Ottawa–Gatineau; it is an official federal designation encompassing the Canadian capital of Ottawa, Ontario, the adjacent city of Gatineau, Quebec, and surrounding suburban and exurban areas. It includes larger urban communities such as Clarence-Rockland, Russell, North Grenville, Val-des-Monts and Cantley. It also includes smaller villages such as Bowman, Denholm, Lochaber and Val-des-Bois.

The National Capital Region has numerous attractions, including festivals, national museums, architecture, sports and entertainment. Gatineau is home to the Canadian Museum of History, one of Canada's most visited museums, designed by the architect Douglas Cardinal, a leading figure in contemporary Indigenous architecture.

==== Amalgamation ====
As part of the 2000–06 municipal reorganization in Quebec, the five municipalities that constituted the Communauté urbaine de l'Outaouais (Outaouais urban community) were merged on 1 January 2002 to constitute the new city of Gatineau. They were:

- Aylmer
- Buckingham
- Hull
- Gatineau
- Masson-Angers

Although Hull was the oldest and most central of the merged cities, the name Gatineau was chosen for the new city. The historic municipality of Gatineau had more residents than Hull, and this name was strongly associated with the area: it was the name of the former county, valley, hills, and park and the main river within the new city limits.

After the 2003 election, the new Liberal government of Jean Charest passed Bill 9, which created a process by which former municipalities could be reconstituted. Contrary to Charest's election promise of full de-amalgamation, Bill 9 restored only selected powers to the de-merged cities (e.g., animal control, garbage pickup, local street maintenance, some cultural facilities). The bigger expenses (e.g., police, fire, main streets, expansion programs) and the majority of the taxes remained in the hands of urban agglomerations. These are controlled by the central merged city because their larger populations give them greater voting weight. In order to hold a referendum on de-amalgamation, 10% of the eligible voters in each former municipality would have to sign a "register".

Residents of Aylmer, Buckingham, Hull and Masson-Angers all surpassed this threshold and sought referendums on de-merge. A simple majority of "yes" votes, based on a turnout of at least 35% of voters, is needed to de-merge. All of the above jurisdictions had the required turnout. A majority of voters in each jurisdiction rejected the de-merger.

Division of population by sector in the city of Gatineau.
| Gatineau | 45.4% |
| Hull | 29.2% |
| Aylmer | 15.9% |
| Buckingham | 5.1% |
| Masson-Angers | 4.3% |

| Former municipality | # of Yes votes | Yes vote (%) | Total votes | Turnout (%) |
|---|---|---|---|---|
| Aylmer | 7,412 | 26.48 | 12,844 | 45.89 |
| Buckingham | 1,779 | 20.27 | 4,302 | 49.02 |
| Hull | 7,820 | 15.71 | 19,885 | 39.94 |
| Masson-Angers | 2,563 | 34.8 | 3,900 | 52.88 |

North American telephone customers placing calls to Gatineau may not recognise the charge details on their bills. The incumbent local exchange carrier, Bell Canada, continues to split Gatineau between five rate centres which have never been amalgamated. The city centre, the core of the pre-merger city of Hull, shares a rate centre with the pre-2001 territory of Ottawa, plus a few close-in suburbs. The "Gatineau" rate centre only serves the pre-merger city of Gatineau. Local calling was not possible between some portions of the "megacity" of Gatineau for some years after the merger.

=== Neighbourhoods ===
Gatineau is divided into five sectors: Hull, Aylmer, Gatineau, Masson-Angers and Buckingham.

== Demography ==
Historical populations
| Year | Pop. | ±% |
|---|---|---|
| 1941 | 2,822 | — |
| 1951 | 5,771 | +104.5% |
| 1956 | 8,423 | +46.0% |
| 1961 | 13,022 | +54.6% |
| 1966 | 17,727 | +36.1% |
| 1971 | 22,321 | +25.9% |
| 1976 | 73,479 | +229.2% |
| 1981 | 74,988 | +2.1% |
| 1986 | 77,708 | +3.6% |
| 1991 | 92,284 | +18.8% |
| 1996 | 100,684 | +9.1% |
| 2001 | 102,898 | +2.2% |
| 2006 | 242,124 | +135.3% |
| 2011 | 265,349 | +9.6% |
| 2016 | 276,245 | +4.1% |
| 2021 | 291,041 | +5.4% |

In the 2021 Census of Population conducted by Statistics Canada, Gatineau had a population of 291,041 living in 126,476 of its 133,225 total private dwellings, a change of 5.4% from its 2016 population of 276,245. With a land area of 341.84 km^{2} (131.99 sq mi), it had a population density of 851.4/km^{2} (2,205.1/sq mi) in 2021.

According to the 2011 census, the city of Gatineau had a population of 265,349. This was an increase of 9.6% compared to 2006. Most of the population live in the urban cores of Aylmer, Hull and the former Gatineau. Buckingham and Masson-Angers are more rural communities. Gatineau is the fourth largest city in Quebec after Montreal, Quebec City, and Laval.

The Quebec part of Ottawa-Gatineau Census Metropolitan Area (CMA) – which includes various peripheral municipalities in addition to Gatineau – had a total population of 314,501. Between 2001 and 2006, there was a net influx of 5,205 people (equivalent to 2% of the total 2001 population) who moved to Gatineau from outside of the Ottawa – Gatineau area. There was also a net outmigration of 630 anglophones (equivalent to 2% of the 2001 anglophone population). Overall, there was a net influx of 1,100 people from Quebec City, 1,060 from Montreal, 545 from Saguenay, 315 from Toronto, 240 from Trois-Rivières, 225 from Kingston, and 180 from Sudbury.

=== Ethnicity ===
The 2001 census found that 4.3% of the population self-identified as having a visible minority status; among others, these include about 1.3% who self-identified as Black, about 1.0% self-identifying as Arab, 0.5% as Latin American, 0.4% as Chinese, 0.3% as Southeast Asian, 0.2% as South Asian, and about 0.1% as Filipino. (Statistics Canada terminology is used throughout.) First Nations comprise 2.7% of the population. The area is home to more than five thousand recent immigrants (i.e. those arriving between 2001 and 2006), who now comprise about two percent of the total population. 11% of these new immigrants have come from Colombia, 10% from China, 7% from France, 6% from Lebanon, 6% from Romania, 4% from Algeria, 3% from the United States and 3% from Congo.

The cultural diversity of the city of Gatineau is noteworthy. The city welcomes between 800 and 1,000 newcomers to Canada each year. They come from some 60 countries and enrich the Gatineau identity.

Canadians were able to self-identify one or more ethnocultural ancestries in the 2001 census. (Percentages may therefore add up to more than 100%.) The most common response was Canadian/Canadien; as the term "Canadian" is as much an expression of citizenship as of ethnicity, these figures should not be considered an exact record of the relative prevalence of different ethnocultural ancestries. 43.1% of respondents gave a single response of Canadian/Canadien while a further 26.5% identified both Canadian/Canadien and one or more other ethnocultural ancestries. With regards to language, 10.4% of respondents gave a single response of French, 1.1% gave a single response of Portuguese, 1.0% gave a single response of Irish, 0.9% gave a single response of Lebanese, 0.8% gave a single response of English, 0.7% gave a single responses of Québécois and 0.7% gave a single response of North American Indian. According to Statistics Canada, counting both single and multiple responses, the most commonly identified ethnocultural ancestries were: 70.7% North American, 37.8% French, 14.3% British Isles, 4.5% Aboriginal, 4.0% Southern European, 3.8% Western European, 1.9% Arab, 1.7% Eastern European, 1.0% East and Southeast Asian, 0.8% African, 0.7% Latin, Central and South American, 0.7% Caribbean and 0.5% Northern European.

Panethnic groups in the City of Gatineau (2001−2021)
| Panethnic group | 2021 | | 2016 | | 2011 | | 2006 | | 2001 | |
| Panethnic group | Pop. | % | Pop. | % | Pop. | % | Pop. | % | Pop. | % |
|---|---|---|---|---|---|---|---|---|---|---|
| European (Note: Statistic includes all persons that did not make up part of a visible minority or an indigenous identity.) | 219,350 | 76.77% | 224,670 | 82.64% | 225,670 | 86.24% | 217,290 | 90.55% | 97,250 | 94.98% |
| African | 27,145 | 9.5% | 16,670 | 6.13% | 10,165 | 3.88% | 5,715 | 2.38% | 1,040 | 1.02% |
| Indigenous | 11,705 | 4.1% | 10,420 | 3.83% | 9,065 | 3.46% | 6,270 | 2.61% | 1,355 | 1.32% |
| Middle Eastern (Note: Statistic includes total responses of "West Asian" and "Arab" under visible minority section on census.) | 11,370 | 3.98% | 9,180 | 3.38% | 7,045 | 2.69% | 4,210 | 1.75% | 1,320 | 1.29% |
| Latin American | 5,595 | 1.96% | 4,170 | 1.53% | 3,855 | 1.47% | 2,415 | 1.01% | 370 | 0.36% |
| East Asian (Note: Statistic includes total responses of "Chinese", "Korean", and "Japanese" under visible minority section on census.) | 3,865 | 1.35% | 2,830 | 1.04% | 2,500 | 0.96% | 1,785 | 0.74% | 335 | 0.33% |
| Southeast Asian (Note: Statistic includes total responses of "Filipino" and "Southeast Asian" under visible minority section on census.) | 2,965 | 1.04% | 1,805 | 0.66% | 1,725 | 0.66% | 1,430 | 0.6% | 225 | 0.22% |
| South Asian | 1,840 | 0.64% | 955 | 0.35% | 795 | 0.3% | 455 | 0.19% | 225 | 0.22% |
| Other/Multiracial (Note: Statistic includes total responses of "Visible minority, n.i.e." and "Multiple visible minorities" under visible minority section on census.) | 1,885 | 0.66% | 1,155 | 0.42% | 845 | 0.32% | 400 | 0.17% | 265 | 0.26% |
| Total responses | 285,715 | 98.17% | 271,850 | 98.41% | 261,665 | 98.61% | 239,980 | 99.11% | 102,385 | 99.5% |
| Total population | 291,041 | 100% | 276,245 | 100% | 265,349 | 100% | 242,124 | 100% | 102,898 | 100% |
Note: Totals greater than 100% due to multiple origin responses

=== Language ===
The following statistics refer to the Quebec portion of the Ottawa–Gatineau CMA (as it was defined in the 2021 census). Counting both single and multiple responses, French was a mother tongue for 78.27% of residents in 2021, English for 16.96%, Arabic for 2.74%, Portuguese for 0.85% and Spanish for 2.0%. (Figures below are for single responses only.)

| Mother tongue | Population | Percentage |
|---|---|---|
| French | 204,290 | 71.1% |
| English | 33,825 | 11.8% |
| Arabic | 7,880 | 2.74% |
| Portuguese | 2,465 | 0.85% |
| Spanish | 5,730 | 2.00% |
| Mandarin | 1,715 | 0.60% |
| Serbo-Croatian | 1,195 | 0.42% |
| Romanian | 1,040 | 0.36% |
| German | 45 | 0.02% |
| Berber | 780 | 0.27% |
| Polish | 470 | 0.16% |
| Italian | 445 | 0.2% |
| Haitian Creole | 1,200 | 0.42% |
| Russian | 1,815 | 0.63% |
| Kirundi | 915 | 0.32% |
| Persian | 475 | 0.17% |
| Lao | 105 | 0.04% |
| Bosnian | 245 | 0.09% |
| Dutch | 115 | 0.04% |
| Serbian | 705 | 0.25% |
| Kinyarwanda | 735 | 0.26% |
| Hungarian | 120 | 0.04% |

Canada Census Mother Tongue - Gatineau, Quebec
| Census | Total | French | | | English | | | French & English | | | Other | | |
| Year | Responses | Count | Trend | Pop % | Count | Trend | Pop % | Count | Trend | Pop % | Count | Trend | Pop % |
| 2021 | 287,510 | 204,290 | ▼0.50% | 71.1% | 33,825 | ▲10.32% | 11.8 | 8,640 | ▲86.40% | 3% | 34,165 | ▲16.7% | 11.9% |
| 2016 | 273,265 | 205,335 | ▲0.9% | 75.14% | 30,660 | ▲5.5% | 11.22% | 4,635 | ▲4.9% | 1.69% | 29,275 | ▲22.72% | 10.7% |
| 2011 | 263,255 | 203,360 | ▲6.22% | 77.24% | 29,060 | ▲14.56% | 11.04% | 4,415 | ▲65.3% | 1.6% | 23,855 | ▲16.33% | 9.06% |
| 2006 | 239,980 | 191,445 | ▲4.35% | 79.77% | 25,365 | ▲3.57% | 10.56% | 2,670 | ▼20.93% | 1.11% | 20,505 | ▲42.6% | 8.54% |
| 2001 | 224,755 | 183,455 | ▲3.6% | 81.6% | 24,115 | ▲5.18% | 10.7% | 2,810 | ▼4.9% | 1.25% | 14,380 | ▲30.9% | 6.39% |
| 1996 | 215,995 | 177,065 | n/a | 81.97% | 23,995 | n/a | 11.1% | 3,005 | n/a | 1.39% | 10,985 | n/a | 5.08% |

=== Religion ===
According to the 2021 census, religious groups in Gatineau included:

- Christianity (178,850 persons or 62.6%)
- Irreligion (88,125 persons or 30.8%)
- Islam (14,840 persons or 5.2%)
- Buddhism (1,165 persons or 0.4%)
- Hinduism (535 persons or 0.2%)
- Judaism (405 persons or 0.1%)
- Indigenous Spirituality (200 persons or 0.1%)
- Sikhism (185 persons or 0.1%)
- Other (1,410 persons or 0.5%)

About 83% of the population identified as Roman Catholic in 2001, while 7% said they had no religion and 5% identified as Protestant (1.3% Anglican, 1.3% United, 0.7% Baptist, 0.3% Lutheran, 0.2% Pentecostal, 0.2% Presbyterian). About 1% of the population identified as Muslim, 0.5% as Jehovah's Witnesses, 0.3% as Buddhist, and 0.2% as Eastern Orthodox.

=== Immigration ===
Immigrants by country of birth (2016 Census)
| Rank | Country | Population |
|---|---|---|
| 1 | Haiti | 2,530 |
| 2 | Lebanon | 2,450 |
| 3 | France | 2,050 |
| 4 | Morocco | 1,985 |
| 5 | Democratic Republic of the Congo | 1,710 |
| 6 | Colombia | 1,710 |
| 7 | China | 1,530 |
| 8 | Algeria | 1,435 |
| 9 | Portugal | 1,275 |
| 10 | Philippines | 1,095 |

There are a total of 44,180 immigrants (by status) in Gatineau (or 15.5% of the whole population) and 5,300 non-permanent residents.

== Economy ==
Originally, Gatineau's economy was based almost entirely on pulp and paper. However, a number of federal and provincial government offices are located in Gatineau, due to its proximity to the national capital, and its status as the main town of the Outaouais region of Quebec.

A policy of the federal government to distribute federal jobs on both sides of the Ottawa River led to the construction of several massive office towers to house federal civil servants in downtown Gatineau; the largest of these are Place du Portage and Terrasses de la Chaudière, occupying part of the downtown core of the city. Some government agencies and ministries headquartered in Gatineau are the Public Works and Government Services Canada, Aboriginal Affairs and Northern Development Canada, Environment Canada, Transportation Safety Board of Canada.

The following federal government departments have their main offices in Gatineau:

- Aboriginal Affairs and Northern Development Canada
- Canadian Heritage
- Employment and Social Development Canada
- Environment Canada (includes offices of Parks Canada)
- Public Works and Government Services Canada

The following agencies have their main offices in Gatineau.

- Transportation Safety Board of Canada
- Passport Canada (under Citizenship and Immigration Canada)
- Competition Bureau, the Canadian Patent Office and the Canadian Radio-television and Telecommunications Commission (under Innovation, Science and Economic Development Canada)

In addition to housing a significant portion of federal government offices, Gatineau is also an important regional centre for the Outaouais region. The city serves as the location for the Superior Court of the District of Gatineau, which encompasses all neighboring municipalities. It also houses two of the region's major hospitals as well as numerous provincial colleges.

Other important economic sectors are health care, tourism, education, small business and the provincial public service. The health care and education sectors are particularly important because they represent the region's largest sources of permanent employment outside the federal government. The provincial public service also has a strong presence in the city, due to its status as the region's principal city. There are two hospitals in the city, one in the Hull sector and the other in the Gatineau sector, as well as numerous other clinics and health centers. There are also numerous primary and secondary schools scattered throughout the city. They are managed by four school boards, three of which are French-speaking and one English-speaking. The city is also a major tourist region, with over a million tourists a year visiting the city's museums, parks, lakes and other outdoor attractions.

The Gatineau-Ottawa metropolitan region has over 1,900 technology companies, employing close to 80,000 workers. There are also over 65 research centers and six universities with over 160,000 students (20% of whom are enrolled in science, engineering, and technology programs).

Gatineau's economy relies on a few important sectors. A majority of jobs are accounted for between the federal government, construction and service industries. There is however a large effort to modernize the economy in the region through recent initiatives in the entrepreneurial and innovation ecosystem. The Innovation Gatineau Institute is a regional innovation centre that boasts co-working space as well as startup incubation and acceleration programs to spur innovative business creation. In 2020, The Honourable Mélanie Joly, Minister of Economic Development and Official Languages, visited the Outaouais region to announce a total of $1,553,448 in financial assistance. This funding will help expand the entrepreneurial ecosystem.

== Arts and culture ==
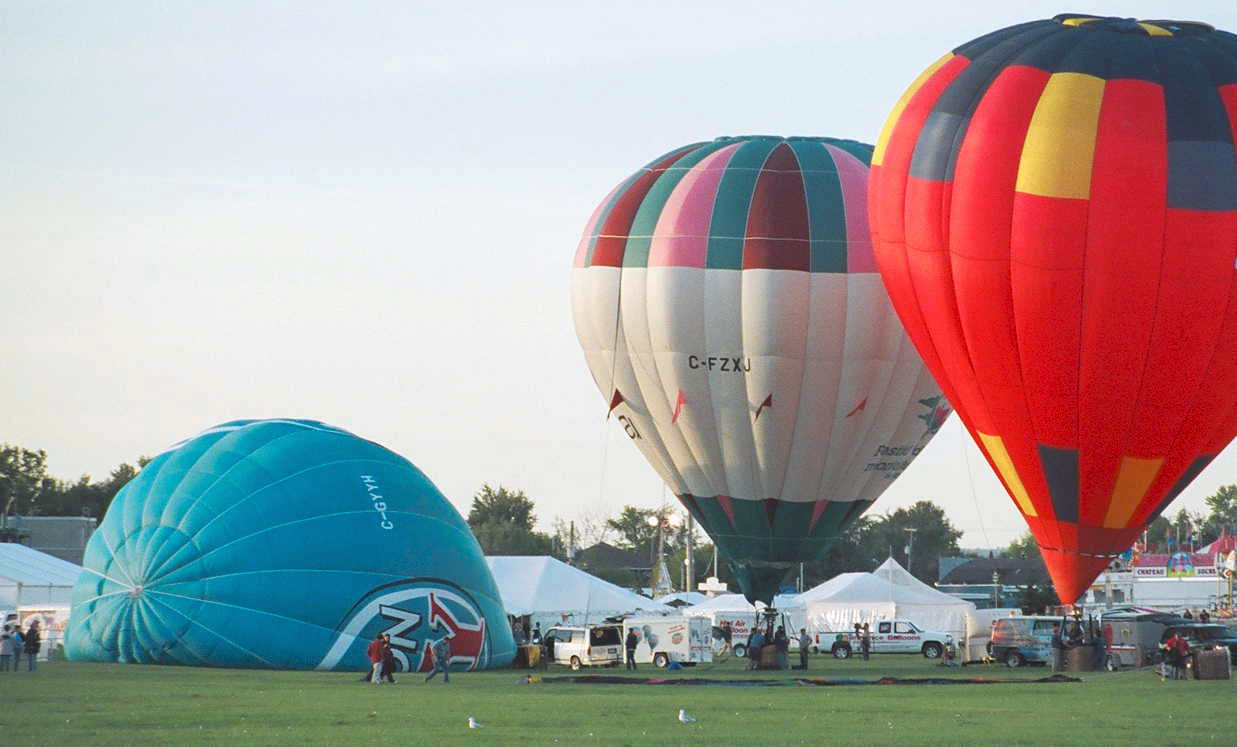
Filling balloons in Jacques Cartier Park for the Gatineau Hot Air Balloon Festival

Gatineau is home to many attractions and cultural events. It is home to national museums such as the Canadian Museum of History and the Canadian Children's Museum. Nightlife within the city of Gatineau is mostly centered in the "Vieux-Hull" sector behind the Federal office complexes of downtown. The area features many bars and restaurants within walking distance from Ottawa. It is a popular spot for young Ontarians as the legal drinking age in Quebec is 18 (as opposed to 19 in Ontario).

=== Shopping ===
Gatineau is home to Les Promenades, which is located at the intersection of Gréber and Maloney Boulevards, one of the city's busiest intersections; it is also just off Autoroute 50. It is the city's largest shopping mall by retail space and by shoppers.

=== Arenas and Performing arts ===
La maison de la culture is a multidisciplinary complex housing the Salle Odyssée. This 830-seat auditorium is the city's main performance venue. The complex also houses the Art-Image exhibition center, the municipal library and many other cultural activities, such as dance and the Gatineau archives.

The newest multidisciplinary complex is called the Centre Slush Puppy. A 4,000-seat arena, including three community ice rinks managed by the non-profit organization Vision Multisports Outaouais, the management model is based on the signing of a 45-year emphyteutic lease. The building will be transferred to the City at the end of the lease. This arena not only hold the QMJHL hockey team Les Olympiques, but also host larger artists such as Flo Rida.

=== Festivals ===
The Casino du Lac-Leamy is also one of the largest tourist attraction in the city. In August, the Casino hosts an international fireworks competition which opposes four different countries with the winner being awarded a Prix Zeus prize for the best overall show (based on several criteria) and can return in the following year. At the beginning of September, on Labour Day weekend, Gatineau hosts an annual hot air balloon festival which fills the skies with colourful gas-fired passenger balloons. One of Gatineau's urban parks, Jacques Cartier Park, is used by the National Capital Commission during the popular festival, Winterlude. In December, the Gatineau Playground Festival takes place at Complex Branchaud-Brière in Gatineau. This one-of-a-kind event provides children and adults with 67,000 square feet of gaming, sports, go-karts, trampolines, and other activities.

=== Music ===
As Gatineau is the smaller of the two cities in its CMA, most major artists perform in Ottawa. However, since the construction of the Centre Slush Puppy, there has been a demand for more events. The first of which was Flo Rida; the rapper almost sold out the 5,000 capacity arena, with around 3,000 tickets sold.

Gatineau is home to numerous French-speaking and English-speaking artists. Two of notable French artists are Eva Avila and Martin Giroux.

=== Parks ===
There are many parks in Gatineau. Some of these parks are well gardened playgrounds or resting spaces while others, like Lac Beauchamp Park, are relatively wild green areas which often merge with the woods and fields of the surrounding municipalities. Streams of all sizes run through these natural expanses. Most of the city is on level ground; however, the Northern and Eastern parts lie on the beginnings of the foothills of the massive Canadian Shield, or Laurentian Mountains. These are the "Gatineau Hills", and are visible in the background of the companion picture.

Gatineau is also the home of the third largest urban park in the world.

== Sports ==
- Gatineau Fusion of the NRL (National Ringette League)
- Gatineau Olympiques of the QMJHL (Quebec Maritimes Junior Hockey League)
- Gatineau Jr. Olympiques (also known as Gatineau Junior Express) are a Canadian Junior ice hockey team based in Gatineau, Quebec. They play in the National Capital Junior Hockey League (NCJHL) since 2006.
- Gatineau Vikings, Canadian football team
- Tyran de Gatineau, a junior elite baseball team of the Ligue de Baseball Junior Élite du Québec.
- L'Intrépides de Gatineau, are a Midget AAA hockey team.
- La Machine de l'Outaouais: a Kin-Ball team of the Ligue Senior élite de Kin-Ball du Québec.
- Évènements Nordiques Gatineau Nordic Events (ENGNE) representing the regions cross country ski community
- Beginning in 2010, the city began hosting an elite women's two-race professional road cycling event, the Grand Prix Cycliste Gatineau, consisting of an individual time trial and a mass-start road race on separate days. Both races are rated 1.1 by the Union Cycliste Internationale, making them the highest ranked women's road cycling events in North America. As of 2020, the race reorganized as the Tour de Gatineau, with the individual time trial portion now known as the Chrono Féminin de Gatineau.

== Government ==
City logo used from 2002 to 2024.

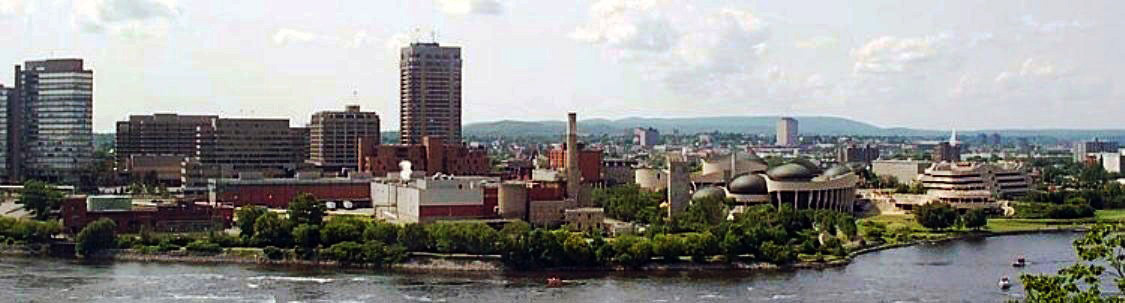
Gatineau

The Gatineau City Council (French: Conseil municipal de Gatineau) is the city's main governing body. It comprises the Mayor of Gatineau and 19 city councillors. The city serves as the seat of the judicial district of Gatineau, which encompasses the entirety of the city of Gatineau as well as several outlying municipalities such as Chelsea, Cantley and Pontiac. The superior court serving the Outaouais region is located in Gatineau across from City Hall on the corner of Laurier and Hôtel-de-Ville. Most of the law firms that represent local businesses throughout the region are also based in Gatineau.

Gatineau federal election results
| Year | Liberal | | Conservative | | Bloc Québécois | | New Democratic | | Green | |
|---|---|---|---|---|---|---|---|---|---|---|
| 2021 | 51% | 69,519 | 11% | 15,772 | 20% | 27,674 | 11% | 14,521 | 2% | 2,687 |
| 2019 | 53% | 76,367 | 10% | 14,324 | 18% | 26,401 | 12% | 17,330 | 5% | 7,874 |

Gatineau provincial election results
| Year | CAQ | | Liberal | | QC solidaire | | Parti Québécois | |
|---|---|---|---|---|---|---|---|---|
| 2018 | 35% | 39,861 | 34% | 39,242 | 16% | 18,277 | 10% | 11,473 |
| 2014 | 13% | 16,126 | 59% | 71,916 | 8% | 9,695 | 18% | 22,352 |

=== Police and law enforcement ===
With more than 250 officers, the Service de police de la Ville de Gatineau (SPVG) provides day-to-day policing for the city, in collaboration with other agencies such as the Sûreté du Québec and the Royal Canadian Mounted Police assisting as necessary. They are also responsible for patrolling sections of the highways located within the city limits, including Autoroute 50 and Autoroute 5. The SPVG is equipped with a CID unit, marine unit, drugs unit, gang suppression unit, and a tactical unit (Groupe d'intervention, or GI). Patrol officers are armed with Smith & Wesson M&P .40 calibre pistols. The SPVG uses the same vehicles as similar police forces throughout North America.

==== Crime ====
Ottawa and Gatineau have some of the lowest crime rates in Canada. In 2022, the national crime rate in Canada increased by 5% to 5,668 crimes per 100,000 people.

With a crime rate of 4,019 crimes per 100,000 people, Ottawa ranks 27th out of 35 cities in Canada. Gatineau is the 28th most dangerous city in Canada, with a crime rate of 3,737 crimes per 100,000 people.

== Infrastructure ==
The Gatineau-Ottawa Executive Airport is Gatineau's municipal airport, capable of handling small jets. There are Canada customs facilities for aircraft coming from outside Canada, a car rental counter and a restaurant. The airport has a few regularly scheduled flights to points within Quebec; however, most residents of Gatineau use the nearby Ottawa Macdonald–Cartier International Airport or travel to Montréal–Pierre Elliott Trudeau International Airport in Montreal.

=== Public transport ===
Ottawa and Gatineau have two distinct bus-based public transit systems with different fare structures, OC Transpo and the Société de transport de l'Outaouais. Tickets are not interchangeable between the two, however passes and transfers from one system to the other do not require payment of a surcharge on any routes. There is a proposed tramway system that would connect Gatineau to Bayview and Rideau Centre Stations in Ottawa.

=== Roads ===
Gatineau has some bike lanes.

Many Gatineau highways and major arteries feed directly into the bridges crossing over to Ottawa, but once there the roads lead into the dense downtown grid or into residential areas, with no direct connection to The Queensway. This difficulty is further magnified by the lack of a major highway on the Quebec side of the Ottawa River connecting Gatineau to Montreal, the metropolis of the province; most travellers from Gatineau to Montreal first cross over to Ottawa, and use Ontario highways to access Montreal. However, it is expected that since Autoroute 50 has been completed, the new link between Gatineau and the Laurentides popular tourist area may serve as part of a Montreal by-pass by the north shore for Outaouais residents.

== Education ==
The education system in Quebec is different from other systems in Canada. It consists of six years of primary schooling and five years of secondary schooling; after this, students may choose to attend an additional school called CEGEP, or Collège d'enseignement général et professionnel. Obtaining a DEC (diplôme d'études collégiales) is one way students may gain access to the province's universities. Another is by gaining at least two years of work experience. CEGEPs offer both pre-university (two-year) and technical (three-year) programs.

With 28.3% of its population over 20 years of age having completed university studies, Gatineau is well ahead of the rest of Canada. Gatineau also has one of the highest bilingualism rates, with 63.5% of its population fluent in both English and French.

The city of Gatineau, within its Hull neighborhood, houses the main campus of the Université du Québec en Outaouais (UQO), part of the Université du Québec network. The UQO counts over 5,500 students, mostly within its multiple social science programs. It is world-renowned for its cyber-psychology laboratory. Faced with a limited number of domains of study, many Quebec students attend other universities, either in Ottawa or Montreal. Every year, the UQO hosts the Bar of Quebec course for certification of new lawyers.

Gatineau is also the home of two CEGEPs, including the francophone Cégep de l'Outaouais (with three campuses across the city) and the anglophone Heritage College.

The main French-language school boards in Gatineau are the Commission scolaire des Portages-de-l'Outaouais, the Commission scolaire au Coeur-des-Vallées, and the Commission scolaire des Draveurs. There are also four private high schools: the all-girl Collège Saint-Joseph, the Collège Saint-Alexandre, and École secondaire Nouvelles-Frontières and le Centre académique de l'Outaouais (CADO). Elementary and secondary education in English is held under the supervision of the Western Quebec School Board.

Since 1995, the National Autonomous University of Mexico (UNAM) has a campus in Gatineau. A military training centre, Defence Public Affairs Learning Centre, is also located in Gatineau.

=== Campus médical Outaouais ===
In 2019, McGill University announced the construction of a new campus for its Faculty of Medicine in the Outaouais region; the undergraduate medical education program will be run in French and it will allow students to complete their undergraduate medical training entirely in the Outaouais. Official communication with politicians has been ongoing since 2016. The new facility will be erected above the emergency room at the Gatineau Hospital, part of the Centre intégré de santé et de services sociaux de l'Outaouais, in addition to new offices for the associated Family Medicine Unit for residency training. Although the preparatory year for students entering the undergraduate medical education program from CEGEP was initially planned to be offered solely at the McGill downtown campus in Montreal, collaboration with the Université du Québec en Outaouais finally made it possible to offer the program entirely in Gatineau.

== Media ==
Gatineau is the city of licence for several television and radio stations serving the National Capital Region, which is a single media market. Many of the Ottawa-Gatineau region's TV and FM broadcast stations transmit from Camp Fortune just north of Gatineau. All of the stations licensed directly to Gatineau broadcast in French.

Weekly newspapers published in Gatineau include Le Bulletin d'Aylmer (bilingual) and The West Quebec Post. Although Gatineau does not have its own daily newspaper, it is served by daily newspapers published in Ottawa, including the French Le Droit and the English Ottawa Citizen and Ottawa Sun.

The Canadian Radio-television and Telecommunications Commission, the Canadian regulatory agency for broadcasting, is based in Gatineau at Terrasses de la Chaudière.

== Notable people ==
- Phillippe Aumont, baseball player
- Eva Avila, singer
- Marc-André Barriault, mixed martial arts fighter
- Daniel Brière, ice hockey player
- Frederic Brunet, ice hockey player
- Antoine Cyr, Olympic cross country skier
- Nicolas Dansereau, professional wrestler
- Andrew Leamy (1816–1868), a pioneer industrialist and community leader in Lower Canada
- Dave Leduc, Lethwei world champion
- Champlain Marcil (1920–2010), photojournalist
- Jean-Gabriel Pageau, ice hockey player
- Stéphane Richer, ice hockey player
- Denis Savard, ice hockey player
- Maxim Tissot, soccer player
- Philemon Wright (1760–1839), founder of Hull

== See also ==
- Chemin de fer de l'Outaouais
- Hull–Chelsea–Wakefield Railway
- List of anglophone communities in Quebec
- List of cities in Quebec
- List of crossings of the Ottawa River
- List of mayors of Gatineau
- List of regional county municipalities and equivalent territories in Quebec
- Municipal reorganization in Quebec
- Sainte-Rose-de-Lima Church, Gatineau
- Twin cities
