= Elgin Theatre (Ottawa) =

Former cinema in Ottawa, Canada

Coordinates: 45.418885°N 75.691590°W

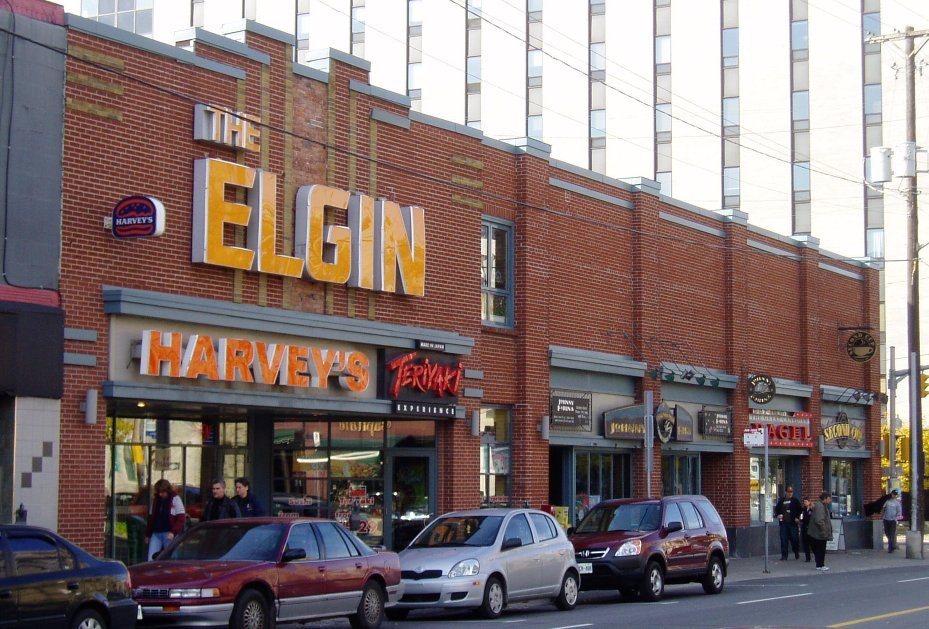
The former Elgin Theatre building, today home to a number of restaurants.

The Elgin Theatre was a historic movie theatre located at the corner of Lisgar and Elgin Street in Ottawa, Ontario, Canada. The 750 seat cinema opened in 1937, with the first film shown being Stand-In. For several decades it was one of Ottawa's premier theatres, and in 1947 it was the location of the world premiere of Mary Pickford's Sleep, My Love.

Owner Nat Taylor, of 20th Century Theatres, opened a second screen on an adjacent patch of land in December 1947. It earned the nickname of "Little Elgin". This makes Elgin the second such dual-screen theatres in Canada, a few months after the Hollywood Theatre in Toronto. In 1957, Taylor became frustrated of having to replace still-profitable films with new releases. For this reason, he put older releases on the second theatre while keeping new releases for the first one. This was the first time a choice was offered at a North American cinema box office, and Taylor is credited as the inventor of the multiplex. Taylor would go on to build ever larger multiplexes, and eventually form the Cineplex Odeon Corporation.

The Elgin eventually became part of the Famous Players cinema chain. In 1994 the company announced that it would be closed. The building was in disrepair, and ironically small downtown theatres were of little use in the era of megaplexes that the Elgin had launched. Despite community efforts and a petition signed by 3,500 to get the company to reconsider, the cinema was shuttered in November 1994. The final film shown in Theatre 1 was Quiz Show. The final film shown in Theatre 2 was an adaptation of the novel Whale Music. There was considerable debate about what to do with the building. The Great Canadian Theatre Company expressed a desire to move into the location, but Ottawa City Council did not support this idea. Eventually the theatre was redeveloped into a cluster of restaurants.

The theatre is closed and now accommodates multiple restaurants:

- Harvey's
- Kinton Ramen (previously Teriyaki Experience/Quiznos/Prince Shawarma/Shawarma Andalos)
- Starbucks (Previously Second Cup)
- Johnny Farina's

== See also ==
- List of Ottawa-Gatineau cinemas
