= Jacques-Cartier Park (Gatineau) =

Park in Gatineau, Quebec, Canada

Coordinates: 45.438318°N 75.707989°W

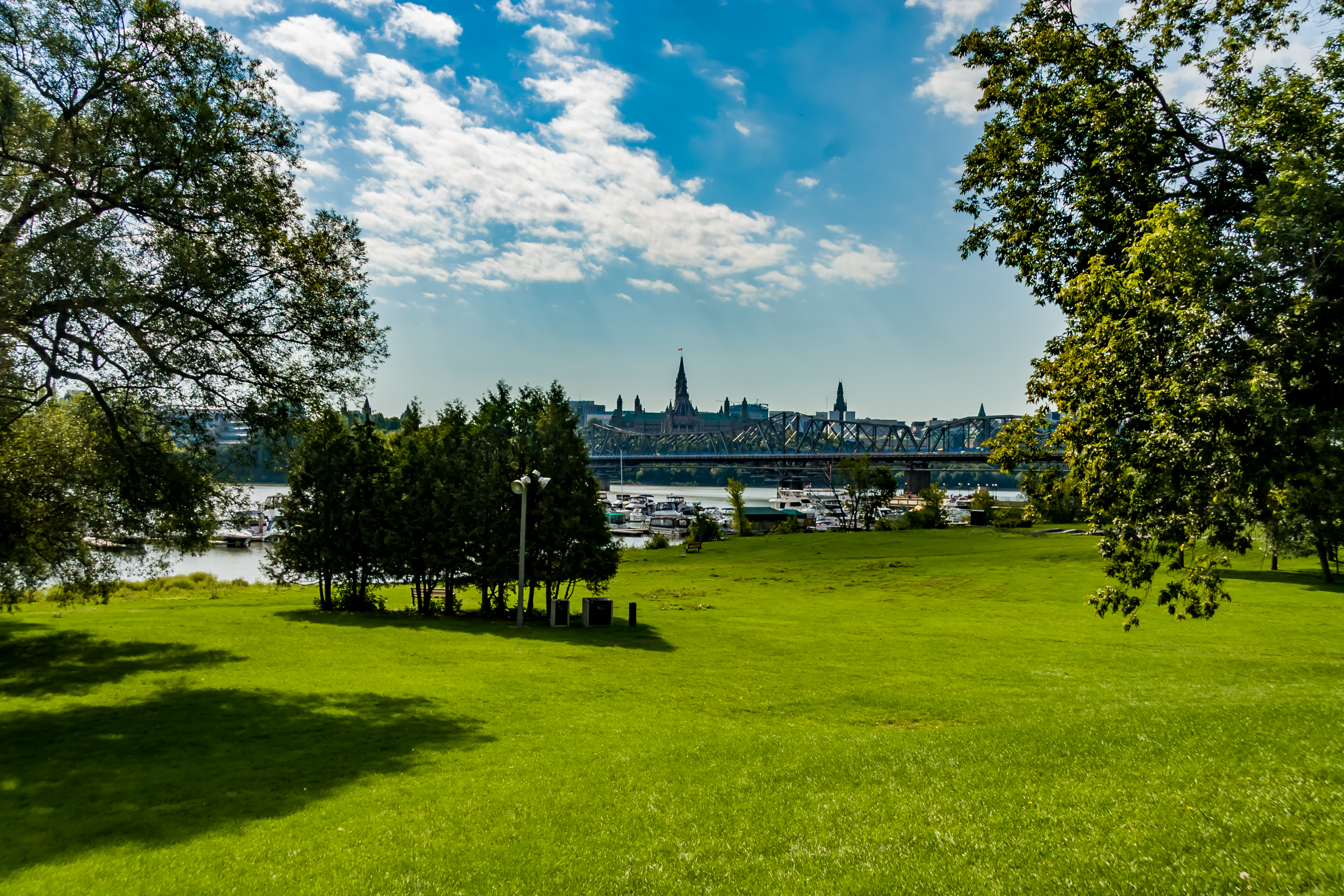
Jacques-Cartier Park, with Parliament Hill in the background

Jacques-Cartier Park is a park in Gatineau, Quebec, Canada, along the Ottawa River. The park is more than 22.68 hectares large and is located at the base of the Alexandra Bridge, facing the National Gallery of Canada in Ottawa. It is named for French explorer Jacques Cartier, who arrived at the mouth of the Ottawa River while he was looking for the Northwest Passage.

The National Capital Commission (NCC) uses the site to run one of its popular annual events, Winterlude, every February. It is also a busy site on Canada Day, offering activities such as music and dance shows throughout the day, entertainment and activities for children, and demonstrations by the Canadian Forces SkyHawks parachute team.

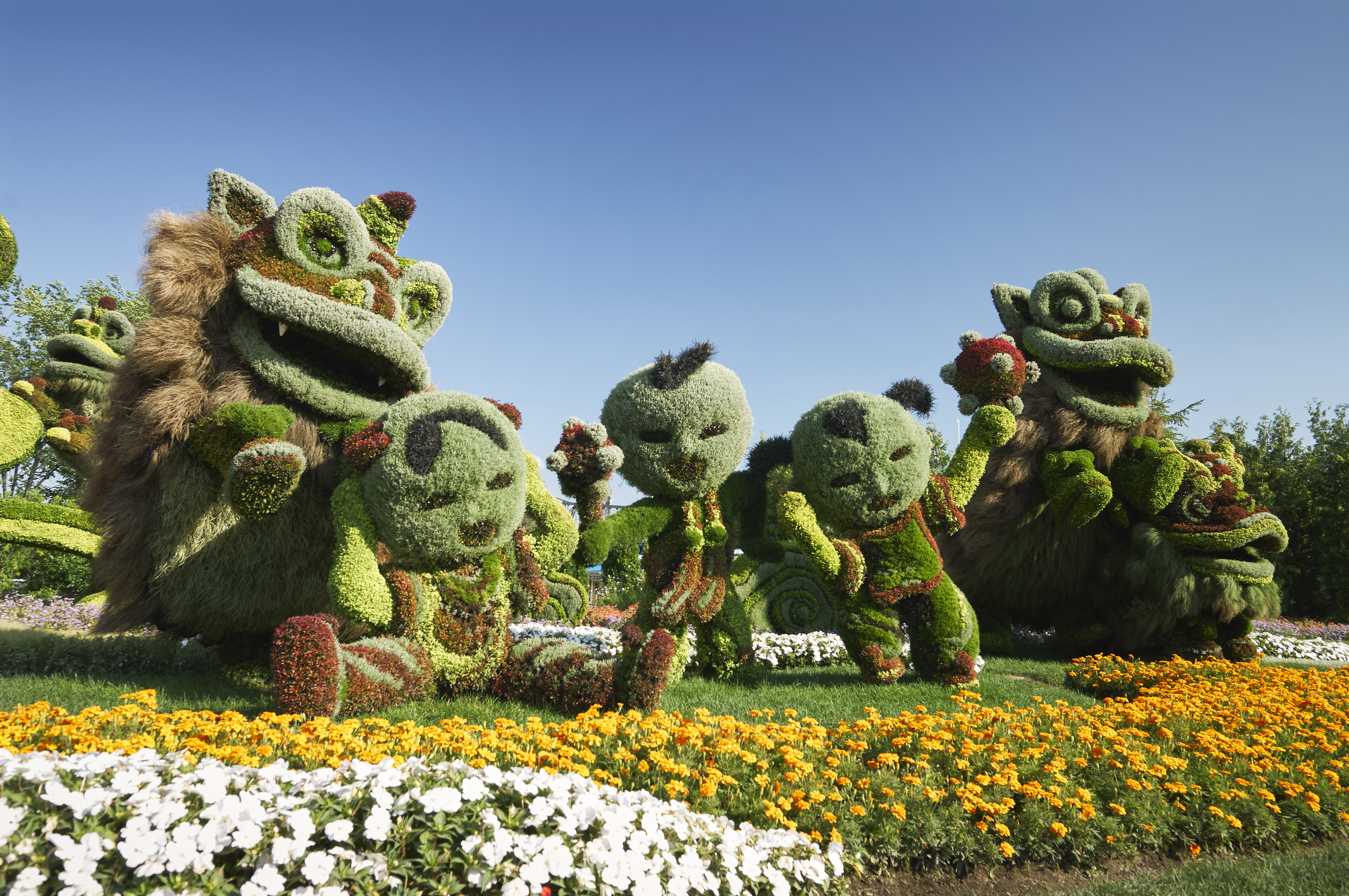
Les Neuf Lions à Gatineau (2017)

Christiana's House/Maison Charron, the oldest surviving house in Hull, and the oldest house in the Ottawa Valley (circa 1804–1815) is located in the park. It was restored by the NCC in 1985 and is used for various activities. The Gilmour Hughson Building is also located in the park, at the north end.
