= Rapibus =

Bus transit system in Gatineau, Quebec

Overview
- Locale: Gatineau, Quebec, Canada
- Transit type: Bus rapid transit
- Number of lines: 7
- Number of stations: 12
- Website: Stations Rapibus

Operation
- Began operation: 2013
- Operator: Société de transport de l'Outaouais

Technical
- System length: 12 km (7.5 mi)

The Rapibus is a bus rapid transit system for the Société de transport de l'Outaouais (STO) in the city of Gatineau, Quebec. Construction was completed in the summer of 2013 with service beginning in the fall. The Rapibus aims to speed up the service for commuters in growing sub-divisions in the northern and eastern areas of the city by alleviating the congestion on key arteries currently served by bus-designated lanes. A direct link to Ottawa is included.

== Development process ==
In the 1990s, the STO and the Communauté Urbaine de l'Outaouais had initiated plans to improve public transit in the Outaouais urban community as traffic problems were growing in several areas particularly in the eastern end of the city in the Quebec Autoroute 50 corridor as well as other bridges spanning the Gatineau and Ottawa Rivers. At that time, the CUO privileged existent railway corridors including the Canadian Pacific line in Hull and Gatineau for a future rapid transit corridor which would by-pass some the most congested areas of the city.

Plans were also made for improved inter-provincial crossing to Ottawa. Before newer studies were made, several new bus lanes were added on Boulevards Gréber, Fournier, Maisonneuve and Alexandre-Taché as well as the Portage Bridge in order to speed up the service in the late 1990s and 2000s. Environmental assessments began in the 2000s but government funding was not immediately available by both the federal and provincial levels.

It was in 2005 that the project started evolving faster as Marc Bureau, defeated Yves Ducharme for mayor of Gatineau in the municipal elections. During his campaign, Bureau listed the Rapibus system as one of his top priorities. A few months after his election win, talks between the City of Gatineau and the Quebec government in order to strike a deal for the amount of funding for the project. Some members of the Gatineau City Council, Mayor Bureau, STO administration staff and Cabinet Ministers of the Quebec provincial government including former Finance Minister Michel Audet and Transport Minister Michel Després along with Treasury Board President Monique Jérôme-Forget met in Quebec City on December 6, 2006, to discuss about the deal and how much each level will spend. Following the meeting, Bureau indicated some optimism about a future deal that would guarantee a $150 million funding by the government. However, the Minister responsible for the Outaouais region Benoît Pelletier told reporters in February 2007 that it would be difficult to realize the project in a short period and no funding was announced in the 2007 Quebec budget on February 20, 2007, prior to the provincial elections. Quebec Premier Jean Charest later promised during the electoral campaign that the project will be completed for 2010 while pledging $75 million for the project.

While awaiting government funding, the STO led by president and Gatineau councillor Louise Poirier launched in late-February 2007 a radio and television campaign promotion about the project to help attract more support from the local residents.

After the provincial elections, the Charest government tabled a second budget which included significant funding for the project which passed the National Assembly on June 1, 2007. An official announcement was made on October 26, 2007 during a press conference with Poirier, Pelletier, new Quebec Transport Minister Julie Boulet and federal Transport minister and former STO president Lawrence Cannon. The Quebec government would invest $146 million while the city of Gatineau will fund the remainder of the costs ($49 million), while there are no direct federal government funding for the project. The initial proposed date for the inauguration of the Rapibus system was 2007; however, it was pushed back for 2010 because of various issues that slowed the process. Multiple environmental assessments were made, as portions of the route would pass through greenspace areas such as Lake Leamy park near the Casino and also near Lake Beauchamp Park in the east end of the city. Construction was set to start in late 2008 or early 2009 with the completion expected by fall 2010; however, it was delayed by a year. Construction of the Rapibus began in late 2009, with completion set for 2013. Groundbreaking on the project occurred on November 30, 2009, at the site of the future Montcalm Station.

== Features ==
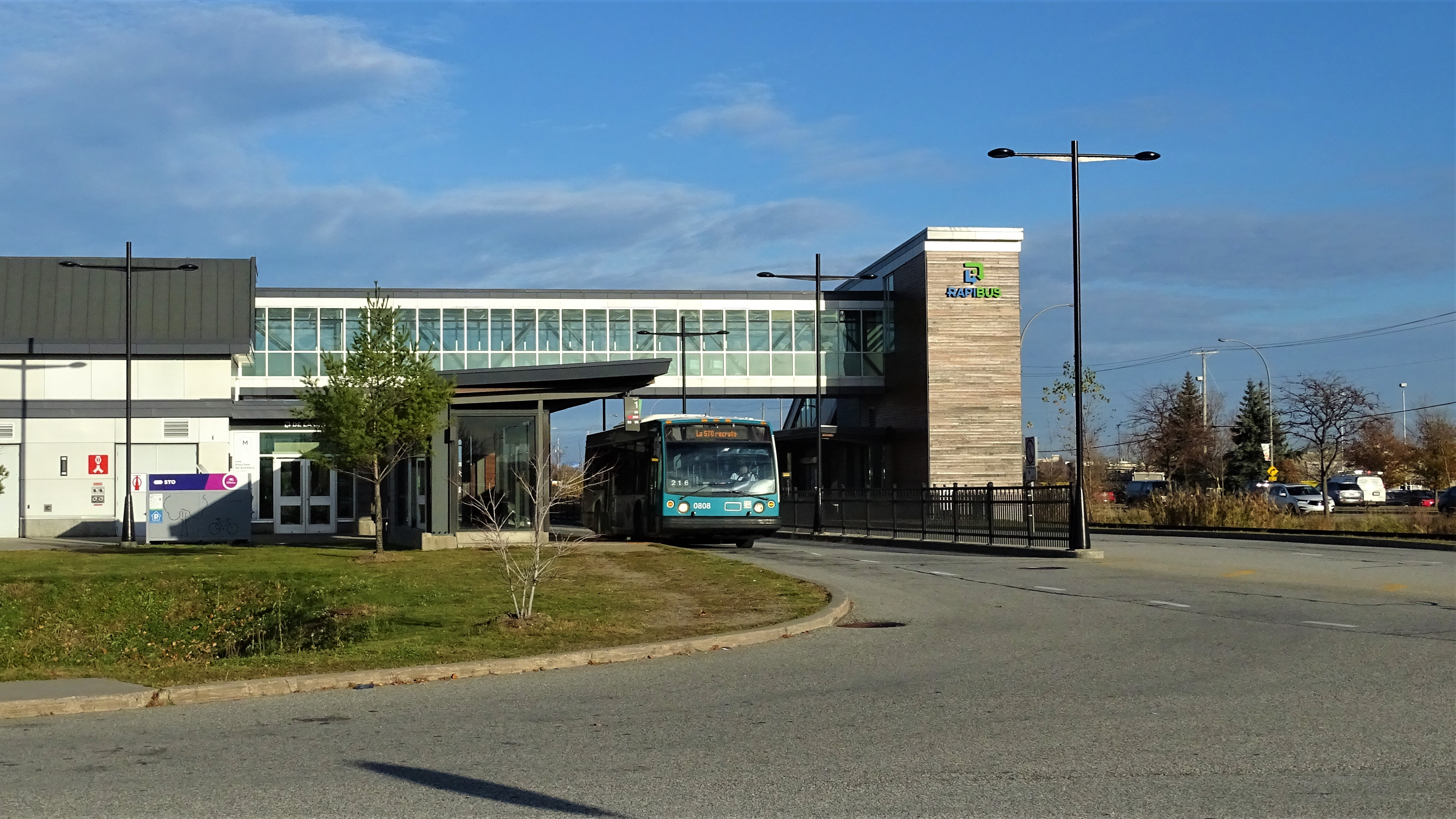
Station La Cité

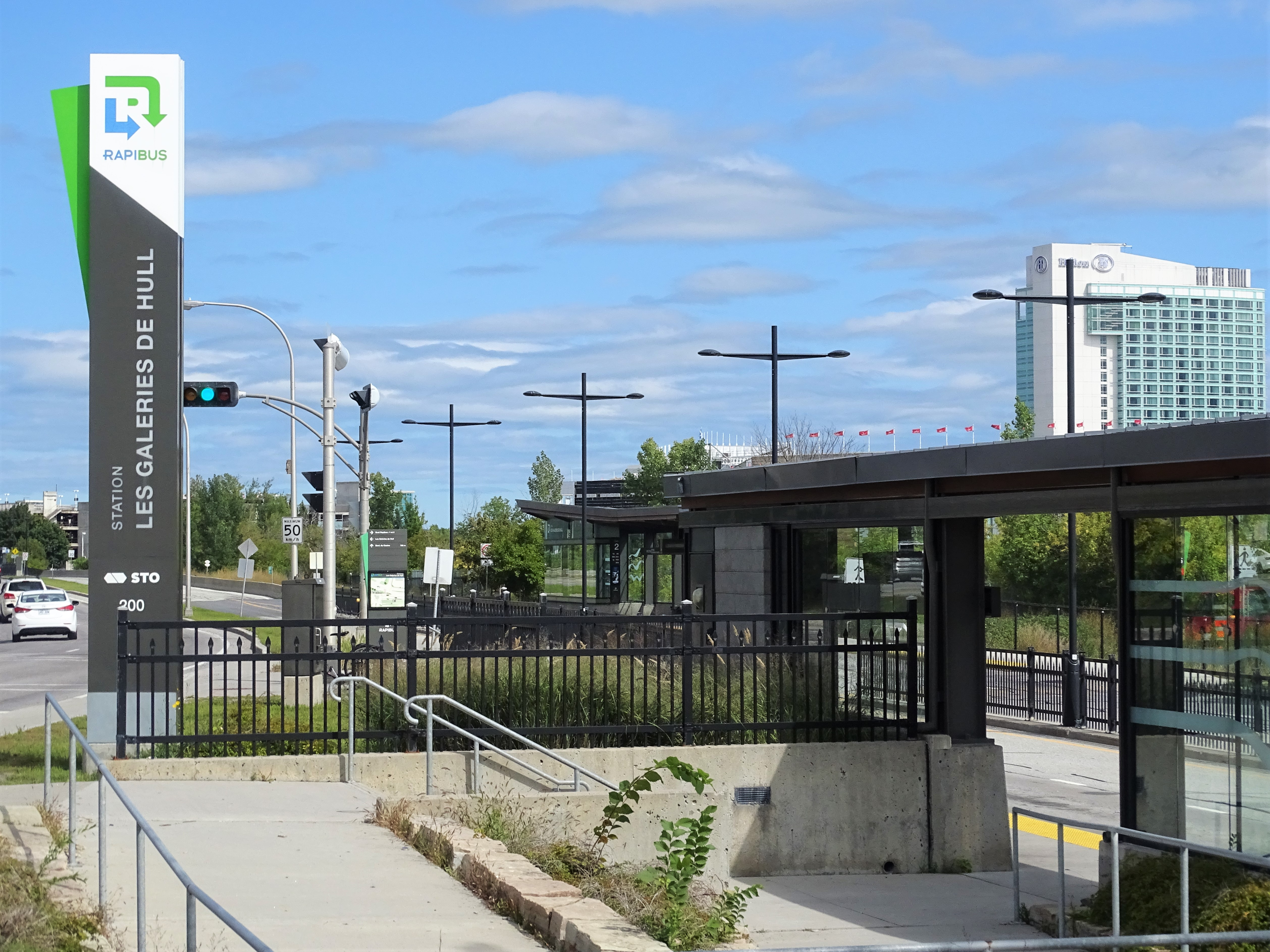
Station Les Galeries de Hull

The Rapibus is similar to the Ottawa transitway. As with the Transitway, it is reserved for high occupancy articulated buses and other STO vehicles including Para-Transit service, inspectors and emergency vehicles. The busway (which will most likely be converted to light rail some time after the year 2031) currently begins in the east-end of the city in the vicinity of Labrosse and Saint-René Boulevards and follows the Quebec Gatineau Railway track (alongside boulevards Maloney and de la Carrière) towards downtown Hull. A bridge over the Gatineau River was expanded to accommodate the rapid transit lane as well as bike trails alongside near Lake Leamy.

As the project was announced, the City mentioned that the Rapibus will transformed significantly the City while Bureau added it was the government's biggest contribution for a project in the region. Bureau and Poirier added that it will encourage several projects along the busway including new work locations as well as housing while reducing significantly greenhouse emissions and increase by 15 to 25% the ridership. Several projects are already located, are under construction or planned. The main features that will be served by the system will include, the largest shopping centre in Gatineau, Les Promenades de l'Outaouais, the Cégep de l'Outaouais (Gatineau campus), Les Galeries de Hull shopping centre, the Casino du Lac-Leamy, the Maison de la Culture, A new power centre which includes a new Wal-Mart mega-store (the largest in Quebec) as well several big-box stores near the De la Gappe station location while near De la Cité Station, a large sports complex has been approved and slated for completion by 2009.

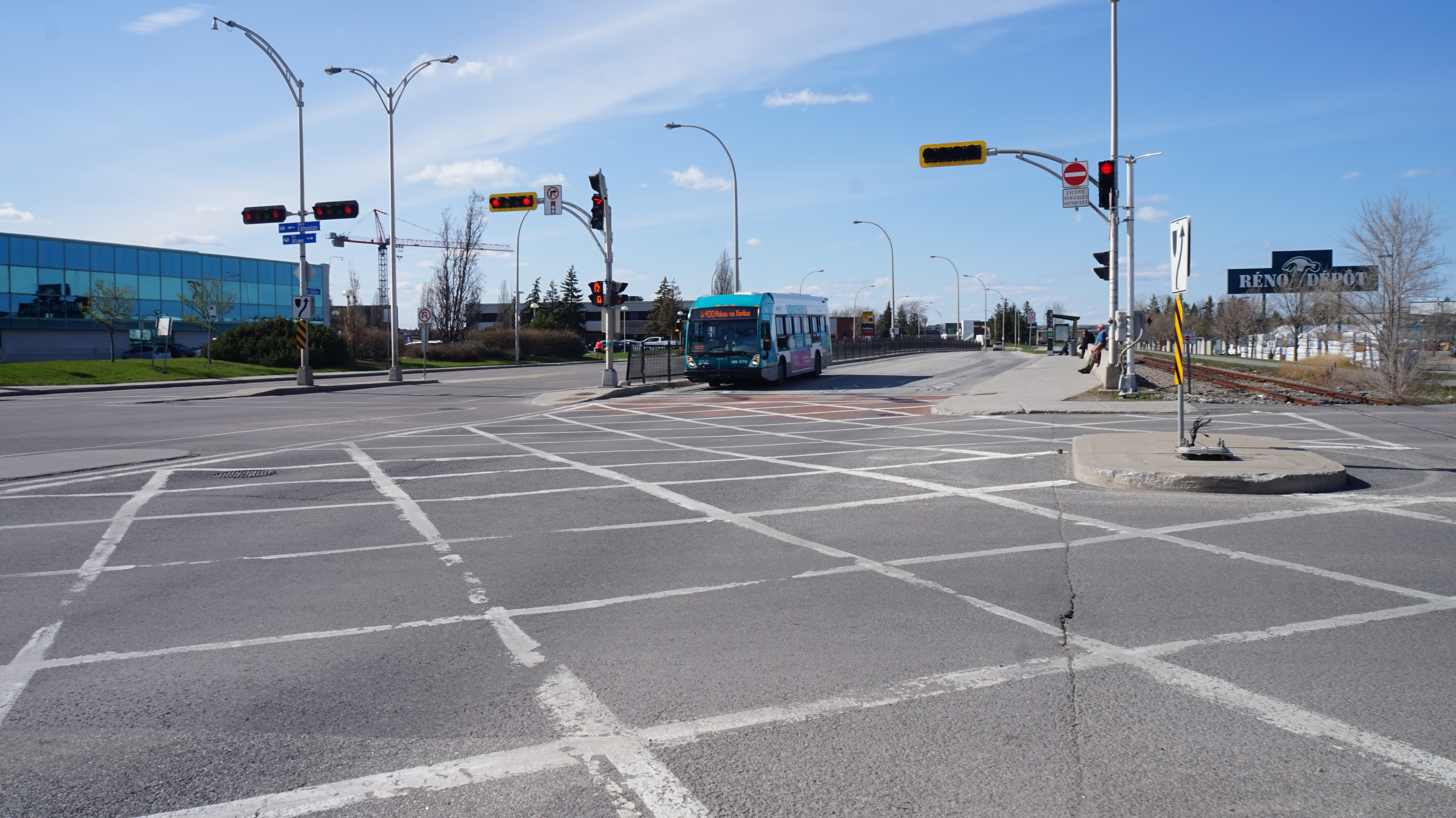
Station Lac Leamy

Meanwhile, in the Hull sector, the Université du Québec en Outaouais is planning to merge both of its Hull campuses and will be expanded further east to near the Rapibus terminus on Saint-Joseph Boulevard with the addition of several buildings for the faculties located outside the Alexandre-Taché campus (mainly the faculties at the Lucien-Brault campus located just a few blocks to the north).

When fully completed, the main segment of the line will run from the Lorrain Boulevard area in the Gatineau sector and along the CFQG line to near the intersection of Alexandre-Taché and Saint-Joseph Boulevards behind the Salaberry Armoury and just east the Université du Québec en Outaouais. Initial plans had the line terminate near Montcalm Street and Quebec Autoroute 50. A second segment will run along portions the Hull-Chelsea-Wakefield Railway from La Carrière Boulevard to Freeman Road. The total length of the completed busway will be approximately 17 kilometers and the current price tag of the project is estimated at around $195 million.

== Transit stations ==
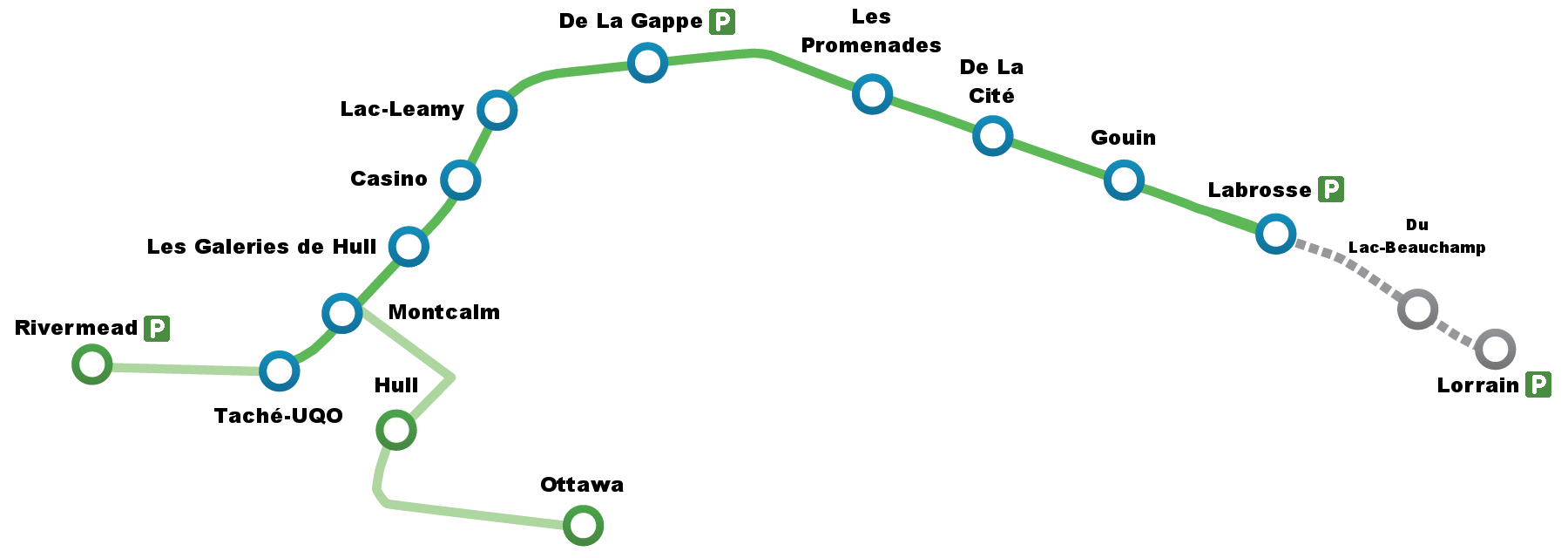
Rapibus Map

There are 12 Rapibus stations on the system's main segment, including two which opened on August 28, 2023. The Taché-UQO station was initially not included in these plans, but it was later added prior to opening, with two Rapibus routes serving it. Several stations will be accommodated by park and ride facilities.

=== Main segment ===
- Taché-UQO: It is the southernmost station of the main Rapibus segment, but it is not a terminus. As the name implies, it is located at 100 Alexandre-Taché Boulevard, near the Université de Québec en Outaouais. Two Rapibus routes serve this station at the northern and southern stops: route 800 with the Allumettières terminus is available from 6:15 AM to 10:54 PM, while route 18 with the Tunney's Pasture terminus is available during peak periods only. Both routes travel throughout the entire Rapibus corridor to the Lorrain terminus. Additionally, several non-Rapibus routes serve the western and eastern stops at Taché-UQO.
- Montcalm: It is located near Rue Montcalm and A-50. In addition to the two Rapibus routes from Taché-UQO, route 400 with the Mackenzie King terminus does not serve Taché-UQO, but otherwise serves Montcalm and the entire Rapibus corridor to the Lorrain terminus.
- Les Galeries de Hull: It is located east from the Les Galeries de Hull mall, with a 5-minute walking distance. The mall also has western bus stations, which do not have Rapibus service.
- Casino: This station is located at the Casino du Lac-Leamy.
- Lac-Leamy: Located at the junction of the Québec Gatineau Railway and the Hull-Chelsea-Wakefield steam train line west of the Gatineau River. Buses leaving this station for eastbound Rapibus service must travel on a single lane bridge.
- De La Gappe: Located near the junction of Quebec Autoroute 50 and Maloney Boulevard near the site of a power center, including a Wal-Mart. Buses leaving this station for westbound Rapibus service must travel on a single lane bridge.
- Les Promenades: It is located to the north of the Promenades de l'Outaouais shopping centre, with a 3-minute walking distance. The mall also has southern bus stations, which do not have Rapibus service.
- De La Cité: Located near Maloney and La Cité Boulevards. Nearby venues include the CEGEP de l'Outaouais Gatineau campus, the Maison de la Culture entertainment centre, the Centre Slush Puppie sports complex, the Cinéma 9 movie theatre, and a Nickels Grill & Bar restaurant. This station is the western terminus of route 97.
- Gouin: It is located near Maloney Est and Montée Paiement. Nearby retailers include Village des Valeurs and U-Haul, while restaurants include St-Hubert and a McDonald's with PlayPlace.
- Labrosse: Located near Labrosse Boulevard between Maloney and Saint-René Boulevards, just south of the Jean-Rene Monette Park and Ride facility. Until August 28, 2023, this was the eastern terminus of the Rapibus.
- Du Lac-Beauchamp: This station opened on August 28, 2023.
- Lorrain: It is the eastern terminus of the Rapibus since August 28, 2023.

=== Transit terminals not located on the Rapibus corridor ===
- Freeman: Located near Saint-Joseph Boulevard and Freeman Road near the existent Freeman Park and Ride facility.

== Future segments ==
The STO is considering a westward extension of the Rapibus to the Aylmer sector, as well as a link to Ottawa near Tunney's Pasture. For eastward transit, the STO is considering the du Cheval-Blanc and de l'Aéroport stations, which are currently under study, to the east of the Lorrain terminus.

On December 9, 2007, Gatineau Councillor Alain Riel told Le Droit that the Rapibus should be extended westward towards Aylmer along the Boulevard des Allumettières corridor until Boulevard Saint-Raymond citing concerns that residents living in nearby Le Plateau and newer communities in Aylmer near the new road will abandon public transit for car usage. He also did not rule out the introduction of a former proposed transit corridor called Via-Bus that was intended to run along a former defunct railway corridor south of Chemin d'Aylmer to downtown Hull but was abandoned due to fierce opposition by residents of Val-Tétrault in the Hull sector. The former railway corridor has since been replaced by an NCC bikeway connecting the Aylmer Marina to the Lady Aberdeen Bridge at the Gatineau River.

== OC Transpo network connection ==
In the 2000s, the City of Ottawa had examined plans to extend its O-Train light rail network towards Gatineau from Bayview station where it would connected to the existing segment. The train would have used the Prince of Wales Bridge and end at the Casino du-Lac Leamy while providing service to the Université du Québec en Outaouais which also has expansion plans in the upcoming years. In 2007, following the cancellation of the north-south light rail expansion to downtown and Barrhaven Centre, a Transportation Task Force Committee led by former Liberal minister David Collenette examined the future of public transit in the region and had proposed a rail line from Bayview to Wakefield via the Casino (where a second line would end) with another line going from downtown Gatineau to Masson-Angers that will follow both existing railways in the Gatineau and Hull sectors as well as all the Rapibus. The City of Gatineau, including mayor Bureau had stated that it would concentrate first on developing the bus network before considering adding rail service in the long range.

The Rapibus project went ahead without a direct bridge link towards Ottawa although environmental assessments for the Prince of Wales Bridge were made possible as part of plans related to interprovincial bridge crossings which will examine possible futures links between Gatineau and Ottawa. A study for an interprovincial transit bridge crossing was canceled in February 2007 in the fallout of the cancellation of the light-rail expansion project. However, later in the year the city of Ottawa resurfaced the possibility of a new Environmental study in the summer of 2007, for inter-provincial links and connections with the Rapibus as part of several recommendations made and funding requests towards higher levels of government for future transportation infrastructures. These projects were the top priorities by Ottawa City Council and mayor Larry O'Brien. That possibility was again mentioned when new corridors for potential bridges were added. According to the city of Ottawa, there was an increase of 25% of people heading from Gatineau to Ottawa over the past 10 years.

In a previous transit expansion plan, slated to be fully implemented by the completion of the original north-south light rail expansion in 2009, OC Transpo planned to add a 90-series route linking the Montcalm Station to Orléans thus adding a connection between OC Transpo and Gatineau's rapid transit system.

== Rollout problems ==
The new system went active on October 19, 2013. Problems were reported. In the first three weeks, four collisions with vehicles occurred along the corridor, all of them caused by motorists running red lights.

Some customers complained that their new commute times increased by as much as 35 min per day though travel times to other areas including the Casino du Lac Leamy and nearby government offices and shopping centres as well as the CEGEP de l'Outaouais (Hull) decreased. Some commuters protested to express frustration.

== See also ==
- Bus rapid transit
- O-Train
- Ottawa Rapid Transit
- Prince of Wales Bridge
- Public transport in Canada
