= Plateau Boulevard =

Collector roadway in Gatineau, Québec

Boulevard du Plateau

Route information
- Length: 5.04 km (3.13 mi)

Location
- Country: Canada
- Province: Quebec

Highway system
- Quebec provincial highways; Autoroutes; List; Former

Boulevard du Plateau is a collector roadway located in Gatineau (specifically in Le Plateau), Quebec, beside Route 148. The boulevard starts at Chemin Vanier in Aylmer and ends at Boulevard Saint-Raymond and Route 148.

It is home to the new D'Arcy McGee English high school, which recently moved from its former location near the Hull Hospital, several kilometres away,

This roadway, which was fairly quiet until the mid-1990s, became very busy after 2000, when the community began to grow rapidly. The increasing number of residents, was one of the reasons that retail and commercial development has exploded, similar to the likes of Barrhaven's Marketplace district as well as the Kanata Centrum and the Holy Trinity/Avalon district of Orleans.

Since the late 1990s, Maxi, SuperC, Reitmans, Moores, Wal-Mart Canada, Rona and Bureau en Gros stores have been built in rapid succession, A large 16-theatre movie complex, known as StarCité Hull, was also built, the largest of its kind in Gatineau.

Local residents have expressed concerns about the growing number of superstores in the area and have asked the city to slow the expansion of the commercial district, as traffic has been getting increasingly congested during shopping hours. However, there is still ample open space left for development that allows for more stores in the future since the road has been completed. In addition, the nearby Boulevard des Allumettières (formerly Boulevard de l'Outaouais), also known as the Highway 50/148 extension, gives eastern residents of the city much faster and easier access to the big-box stores in the area which would add to traffic congestion. Boulevard des Grives has been extended to the 148 to help reduce congestion.

As of 2006, community has entered the Aylmer sector, and its population is expected to approach the 15,000-20,000 range.

== See also ==
- List of Gatineau roads
