= Fournier Boulevard =

Boulevard Fournier is a main route in the city of Gatineau, Quebec that connects the Gatineau and Hull sectors. It starts as the extension of Boulevard Greber in the old city of Gatineau and ends at the entrance of the downtown core where it becomes Boulevard Maisonneuve which connects the Portage Bridge towards Ottawa. It was once part of Route 148 until the Quebec Ministry of Transportation rerouted the provincial highway onto Autoroute 50 and Autoroute 5 as a concurrency.

The road crosses right in the middle of Lac Leamy Park one of the key greenspaces of the city. A road connects Fournier to the Lake and its beaches itself. Several bike paths connect the boulevard to the lake or Jacques Cartier Park and downtown Gatineau and Ottawa.

The artery was named after Alphonse Fournier.

== Lady Aberdeen Bridge ==
The Lady Aberdeen Bridge that crosses the Gatineau River is the oldest bridge connecting the former city of Gatineau to the former City of Hull. Previously only a two-lane bridge, it was built at the beginning in 1894 and named the Gatineau Bridge.

It was renamed Lady Aberdeen for the wife of former Governor General of Canada John Hamilton-Gordon, 1st Marquess of Aberdeen and Temair, Ishbel Maria Marjoribanks when she nearly drowned near the bridge while returning from a meeting at the nearby Saint-François-de-Sales church, and was rescued by local villagers.

It was replaced in 1931 by the current structure by the Dominion Bridge Company. However, due to the population growth in the Pointe-Gatineau sector, a second bridge that is used for southbound commuters was built. Recently, the city of Gatineau was concerned about the structure of the older portion of the bridge and is doing repairs to solidify it. It imposed a weight restriction on the area prompting heavy trucks to travel on Autoroute 50.

Major reconstruction of the old structure started in 2006 and continued for most of 2007. In 2007, the construction forced the shut down of the northbound lanes towards Pointe-Gatineau, diverting the traffic towards the southbound structure with one lane in each direction except during peak periods where it is closed to northbound traffic in the morning and southbound traffic in the afternoon. Cyclist and pedestrian traffic are forced to use the western sidewalk and a narrow lane beside it. Part of the Route Verte provincial bicycle network, TV station CHOT-TV discussed during a news report safety issues during the construction period due to the high risk of accidents between cyclists and vehicles as one of the collisions during the summer was a fatal one.

== Transit Priorities ==
It is also the main route used by STO buses traveling to and from downtown Gatineau and the old Gatineau sector and there are bus lanes along most of the stretch. Those lanes were necessary due to the very high flow of traffic (sometimes there is much congestion), since this road is used as an alternative to Autoroute 50. Express routes and some regular routes travels on Fournier, but express routes do not serve the stops due to a closed-doors policy that speed up travel time for express users. On both sides of the bridges, there are transit signal priorities in which buses can cross the intersection before the green light preventing to be caught in line-ups.

The measures are in place until the STO's Rapibus, which will follow the Quebec-Gatineau Railway Line, will be in operation starting in 2010.

== See also ==
- List of bridges in Canada
- List of Gatineau roads
