= List of Gatineau roads =

This list contains the main roads throughout the city of Gatineau.

== Autoroutes ==
- Autoroute 5 (Autoroute de la Gatineau)
- Autoroute 50 (Autoroute Guy-Lafleur)

== Avenues ==
- Avenue de Buckingham
- Avenue Gatineau

== Boulevards ==
- Boulevard Alexandre-Taché
- Boulevard de la Carrière
- Boulevard de la Cite
- Boulevard de la Cité-des-Jeunes
- Boulevard de la Gappe
- Boulevard de l'Hopital
- Boulevard de l'Outaouais (renamed Boulevard des Allumettières)
- Boulevard de Lucerne
- Boulevard des Allumettières (Route 148) (merger of Boulevard Saint-Laurent, Boulevard de l'Outaouais and Chemin McConnell)
- Boulevard des Grives
- Boulevard des Hautes-Plaines
- Boulevard des Trembles
- Boulevard du Casino
- Boulevard du Mont-Bleu
- Boulevard du Plateau
- Boulevard Fournier
- Boulevard Gréber
- Boulevard Labrosse
- Boulevard La Vérendrye
- Boulevard Lionel-Emond
- Boulevard Lorrain (Route 366)
- Boulevard Maisonneuve
- Boulevard Maloney (Route 148)
- Boulevard Montclair
- Boulevard Riel
- Boulevard Sacré-Coeur
- Route 105
- Boulevard Saint-Raymond (Route 148)
- Boulevard Saint-René
- Boulevard Wilfrid-Lavigne

== Chemins (Roads) ==
- Chemin d'Aylmer
- Chemin de Masson
- Chemin de Montréal
- Chemin de la Savane
- Chemin des Erables
- Chemin des Terres
- Chemin Cook
- Chemin Eardley
- Chemin Freeman
- Chemin McConnell (portions were merged into Boulevard de l'Outaouais, now called Boulevard des Allumettières)
- Chemin Klock
- Chemin Perry
- Chemin Pink
- Chemin Tache
- Chemin Vanier

== Promenades (Parkways) ==
- Promenade de la Gatineau
- Promenade du Lac-des-Fées

== Rues (Streets) ==
- Rue du Centre
- Rue Davidson
- Rue Front
- Rue Gamelin
- Rue Georges
- Rue Goulet
- Rue Jacques-Cartier
- Rue Jean-Proulx
- Rue Laurier
- Rue MacLaren
- Rue Main
- Rue Montcalm
- Rue Notre-Dame
- Rue Principale
- Rue Roméo-Gendron
- Rue Saint-Louis (Route 307)

== Auto bridges ==
- Alexandra Bridge
- Alonzo Wright Bridge
- Champlain Bridge
- Chaudière Bridge
- Des Draveurs Bridge
- Lady Aberdeen Bridge
- Macdonald-Cartier Bridge
- Portage Bridge

== Other arteries ==
- Montée Paiement
- Place Samuel-de-Champlain
- Prince of Wales Bridge
