= Janine Leroux-Guillaume =

Canadian artist (1927–2018)

- Born: 1927; Saint-Hermas, Quebec, Canada
- Died: January 30, 2018; Montreal, Quebec, Canada
- Known for: Master printer
- Spouse: Pierre Guillaume

Janine Leroux-Guillaume (1927 – 30 January 2018) was a Canadian master printer and worked in other media including painting, collage and sculpture.

== Career ==
Leroux-Guillaume was born in Saint-Hermas, Quebec, and studied engraving at the School of Graphic Arts in Montreal and at the École des beaux-arts de Montréal with Madame Charlebois and Albert Dumouchel. She graduated from the École des beaux-arts de Montréal in 1954.

Afterwards, Leroux-Guillaume travelled in Europe and studied at the Atelier Lacourière in Paris in 1959. She exhibited her work in Ljubljana, Yugoslavia, in 1960 and at the Montreal Museum of Fine Arts, the Society of Canadian Painter-Etchers and Engravers, also at Winnipeg, Hamilton, and Toronto.

Leroux-Guillaume also illustrated poetry books. In 1964 she received a scholarship from the Department of Education of Quebec. Her work is included in the collections of the National Gallery of Canada, the Musée d'art contemporain de Montréal, the Musée national des beaux-arts du Québec and McMaster University in Hamilton. She taught plastic arts for the Catholic School Commission for a number of years also engraving at the École des beaux-arts de Montréal.

Leroux-Guillaume died in Montreal, Quebec on 30 January 2018, two days after the opening of a retrospective exhibition of her work at the Center d'art Diane-Dufresne, in Repentigny in 2018.
