= Cité-des-Jeunes Boulevard =

Major road in the city of Gatineau, Quebec

Boulevard de la Cité-des-Jeunes is a major road in the city of Gatineau, Quebec. It begins on the northwestern outskirts of the city, where Chemin de la Mine becomes Boulevard de la Cité-des-Jeunes, and runs mainly to the southeast, along the eastern boundary of Gatineau Park. The Boulevard later becomes Promenade du Lac des Fees after meeting with Boulevard Saint-Raymond near the hospital. From the south end and travelling in the other direction, the roadway begins at Boulevard Saint-Joseph as two one-way streets (Duquesne and Graham), becomes Promenade du Lac des Fees followed by Boulevard de la Cité-des-Jeunes and chemin de la Mine, which ends at Chemin Notch inside Gatineau Park.

There is a French-language high school (École secondaire (Secondary School) Mont-Bleu – previously known as Polyvalente Mont-Bleu) and two CEGEPs (Heritage College and CEGEP de l'Outaouais) all within short distances of each other. The Asticou Centre is also close by. It was named Cité-des-Jeunes (French for 'City of Youths') in the 1960s when the Polyvalente de Hull, which existed from 1966 to 1974, was built. Asticou Centre now occupies the buildings.

It is a somewhat scenic route for much of its length, as on one side of the road is the beautiful Gatineau Park.

There are many apartment buildings on the east side of the road, many of them occupied by students of the CÉGEP. It is predominantly a residential area, though there is a Metro supermarket, a few strip malls, and a Subway Restaurants location. There are very few other structures on the western side of the road besides the schools, although a small sports complex is located beside the Mont-Bleu school.

There are many bike and walking paths along Cité-des-Jeunes and through Gatineau Park. Gatineau park is also a popular place for cross country skiing.

== Neighbourhoods ==
- Lac des Fees
- Parc de la Montagne
- Mont-Bleu
- Hautes Plaines

== See also ==
- List of Gatineau roads
