= Boulevard de Maisonneuve =

Boulevard de Maisonneuve may refer to:

- De Maisonneuve Boulevard in Montreal
- Boulevard Maisonneuve in Gatineau
