= Alexandre-Taché Boulevard =

Road in Gatineau, Quebec

Boulevard Alexandre-Taché

Location
- Country: Canada
- Province: Quebec

Highway system
- Quebec provincial highways; Autoroutes; List; Former

Boulevard Alexandre-Taché is an east–west road located in the city of Gatineau, Quebec. It is named in honour of former member for the Hull electoral district, Alexandre Taché, who served for 15 years with the Union Nationale when the political party was in power under the leadership of Maurice Duplessis.

The road starts at the western limits of the Hull sector with Aylmer just west of Boulevard Saint-Raymond south of the Manoir des Trembles community. (West of that point, the roadway is known as Chemin d'Aylmer) It travels eastward through the neighbourhoods of Val-Tétrault and Saint-Jean-Bosco while it passes by the southern edge of Gatineau Park, where its parkway begins. It ends at the entrance of the Chaudière Bridge, in front of les Terrasses de la Chaudière office complex, where it becomes Rue Laurier.

It is a very important route for commuters during rush hours, which frequently causes congestion, especially on the one-lane westbound section between the Université du Québec en Outaouais and Boulevard Saint-Joseph during the afternoon and near the Chaudière Bridge in the morning, as only one lane is available for regular vehicles eastbound.

== Features ==
This road is home to the Université du Québec en Outaouais's Alexandre-Taché Campus and would be expanded over the next years when new buildings will be built. The route is also home of the region's music conservatory.

At the intersection of the Chaudière Bridge is the old E.B Eddy plant, a historic landmark for the region's wood pulp and lumber industries during the past century and a half. Domtar, the main industry company after acquiring E.B Eddy is currently occupying several mills across the intersection and right along the bridge corridor.

== Transit priorities ==
Most of the route contains bus lanes which are used by the STO buses during rush hour. The section between Boulevard Saint-Joseph and Rue Montcalm contains a feature similar to the Champlain Bridge, where the center lane (which is usually for westbound traffic) is available for buses and taxicabs heading eastbound during the morning commute. Illuminated signs direct the traffic on that particular lane. Formerly, traffic cones were used to prevent eastbound traffic from using that lane in the morning. Initially, buses would have used a transit corridor called Via-Bus. However, residents opposed the project and it was subsequently postponed indefinitely. There are also future plans to add an O-Train link that would serve the boulevard near the university but the city of Gatineau has opposed the project.

== Former Route 148 ==
It was formerly known as Route 148, before the construction of an Aylmer By-Pass called Boulevard des Allumettières (formerly Boulevard de l'Outaouais).

== Neighbourhoods ==
- Manoir des Trembles
- Val-Tetrault
- St-Jean Bosco/Wrightville
- Île de Hull/Vieux-Hull
- Downtown

== See also ==
- List of Gatineau roads
