= Quebec Autoroute 5 =

Highway in Quebec

Autoroute 5
- Autoroute de la Gatineau
- A-5 highlighted in red

Route information
- Maintained by Transports Québec
- Length: 33.8 km (21.0 mi)
- Existed: 1964–present

Major junctions
- South end: King Edward Avenue in Ottawa, ON
- A-50 / R-148 in Gatineau
- North end: R-105 / R-366 in La Pêche

Location
- Country: Canada
- Province: Quebec
- Major cities: Gatineau, La Pêche, Chelsea

Highway system
- Quebec provincial highways; Autoroutes; List; Former
← A-973	→ A-10

Autoroute 5 (A-5, also known as the Autoroute de la Gatineau) is a short controlled-access Autoroute in the Outaouais region of western Quebec. It connects the central urban area of Gatineau (formerly Hull) with the recreational areas of Gatineau Park and the exurban rural areas of Chelsea and La Pêche. The southern terminus provides access to the Macdonald-Cartier Bridge, which continues into downtown Ottawa. The A-5 generally has four lanes of traffic (two per direction) with the exception of southernmost section across the Macdonald-Cartier Bridge where A-5 widens to six lanes (three per direction).

Part of Route 148 overlapped A-5 from Autoroute 50 to Boulevard Saint-Raymond until completion of Boulevard des Allumettières in 2007. With the completion of Boulevard des Allumettières, Route 148 was rerouted onto the southern leg of Autoroute 50 and then west towards Aylmer on Boulevard des Allumettières. Autoroute 5 is the only Quebec A-class Autoroute to have only 1 digit in its name.

== Route description ==
Autoroute 5 begins at the Ontario-Quebec border on the MacDonald-Cartier Bridge, which is 6 lanes wide. Upon hitting land, Autoroute 5 loses 2 lanes and interchanges with Boulevard Maisonneuve/Boulevard Fournier and Autoroute 50 in quick succession. It then curves northwest, interchanging with Boulevard du Casino, providing access to Casino du Lac-Leamy. Autoroute 5 services Gatineau with two more interchanges before leaving the urban area, where a grass median forms. Autoroute 5 then interchanges with Chemin Old Chelsea and Chemin Scott, which provide access to Gatineau Park as well as Chelsea. The expressway then meanders through forested land, largely parallel to Route 105. At Exit 28, Route 105 joins Autoroute 5 in a concurrency until the end of Autoroute 5, which occurs 3.5 km later, bypassing the hamlet of Wakefield. Autoroute 5 gradually loses its median and center divider before ending at a T-intersection, where Route 105 continues east.

The speed limit on Autoroute 5 is 100 km/h north of Boulevard du Casino, and 70 km/h south of it.

== History ==
Until October 2014 there had been two segments of A-5 for several years:

1. The main segment was a freeway that continued for 21.5 km (13.4 mi) from the Macdonald-Cartier Bridge through the Hull sector of Gatineau to a short access road to Route 105 south of Wakefield.
2. The second segment, built in 1993, was a short four-lane, at-grade expressway bypass of Wakefield, which overlapped Route 105 and Route 366. The MTQ plan to eliminate the discontinuity between the two segments was completed in October 2014. Further extensions of A-5 north of Wakefield have been deemed unnecessary given the current AADT on Route 105.

A 2.5 km (1.6 mi) extension of the southern segment past Tulip Valley, an area of Route 105 that has been the site of multiple fatal incidents in the past, was opened on 4 December 2009 following a $27 million (CA$) extension project. Another $115 million 6.5 kilometres (4.0 mi) project began in 2010 to connect the south and north segments, completing the carriageway to Wakefield in October 2014.

Beginning in June 2008, the MTQ began replacing the concrete surface from Ottawa to Saint-Joseph Boulevard with asphalt after multiple incidents in which pieces of concrete broke out from the surface including one that struck the windshield of a vehicle, killing its driver in November 2007. Construction was completed by the end of 2008.

== Exit list ==
RCM	Location	km	mi	Exit	Destinations	Notes
Ottawa River		0.00	0.00	–	King Edward Avenue (Road 99 south) to Highway 417 – Ottawa	Continuation into Ontario
Ottawa River		0.00	0.00	Pont Macdonald-Cartier (Macdonald-Cartier Bridge)		
Gatineau		0.30	0.19	1	Boulevard Maisonneuve / Boulevard Fournier – Centre-Ville Gatineau	No southbound exit to northbound Boulevard Fournier. Southbound exit is via exit 2
Gatineau		0.80	0.50	2	A-50 east (Autoroute de l'Outaouais) / R-148 east – Montréal	A-50 exit 135
Gatineau		2.60	1.62	3	Boulevard du Casino / Boulevard Saint-Raymond – Pontiac	Also serves R-105
Gatineau		4.10	2.55	5	R-105 (Boulevard Saint-Joseph) / Boulevard Mont-Bleu	Signed as exits 5N (north) and 5S (south) northbound
Gatineau		7.20	4.47	8	Boulevard des Hautes-Plaines	
Les Collines-de-l'Outaouais	Chelsea	11.50	7.15	12	Chemin Old Chelsea	Northbound exit and southbound entrance
Les Collines-de-l'Outaouais	Chelsea	13.50	8.39	13	Tenaga, Old Chelsea	
Les Collines-de-l'Outaouais	Chelsea	21.50	13.36	21	Chemin de la Rivière	Access via R-105
Les Collines-de-l'Outaouais	Chelsea	25.50	15.84	24	Chemin Cross Loop	Also serves R-105
Les Collines-de-l'Outaouais	La Pêche	30.00	18.64	28	R-105 south / R-366 west / Chemin de la Vallée-de-Wakefield	Southern terminus of R-105 / R-366 concurrency
Les Collines-de-l'Outaouais	La Pêche	33.50	20.82	–	R-105 north / R-366 east / Chemin Maclaren west – Val-des-Monts, Maniwaki, La Pêche	At-grade intersection; to be replaced with a roundabout
1.000 mi = 1.609 km; 1.000 km = 0.621 mi: Concurrency terminus; Incomplete access

== Gallery ==
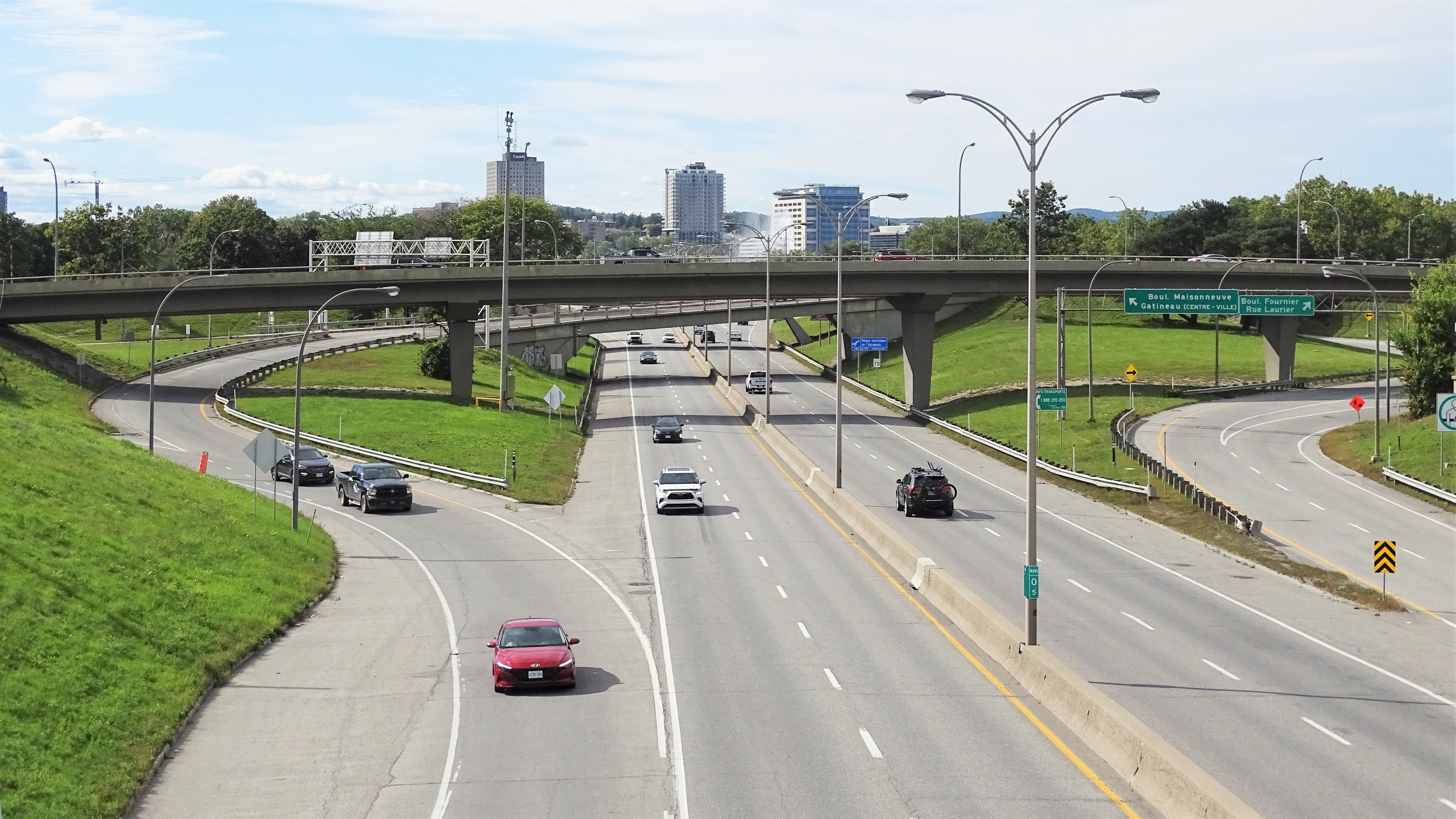
Autoroute 5 looking north at exit 1, directly north of the MacDonald-Cartier bridge in Gatineau

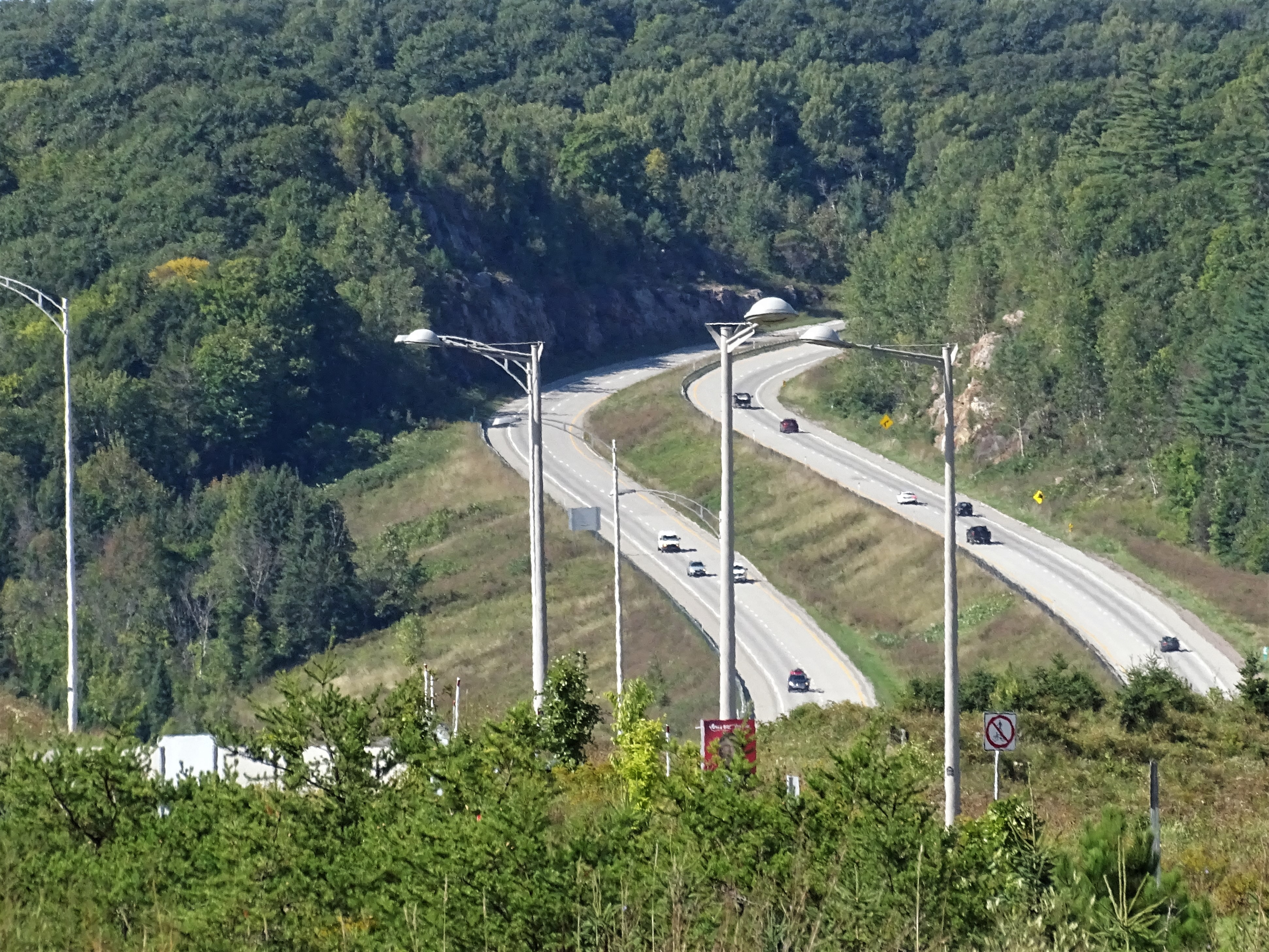
Autoroute 5 looking north from exit 28 in La Pêche—this stretch is concurrent with Quebec Routes 105 and 366
