= Gréber Boulevard =

Boulevard Gréber (or Gréber Boulevard) is an important principal arterial road in Gatineau, Quebec. It runs from Montee Paiement to the Gatineau River. It is named after French urban planner Jacques Gréber. It was once part of Route 148 of the provincial network.

The southern part of the route includes numerous stores, restaurants, gentlemen's clubs and motels. About 1 km north of Boulevard Maloney (or Maloney Boulevard) it travels through a residential area with apartment buildings on the west side and small houses on the east side.

Most of the road has four lanes as the traffic flow is quite heavy particularly near the junction with Autoroute 50 and the commercial district. On the southern stretch between La Savane and the Lady Aberdeen Bridge there is a bus lane for STO routes, since most express routes and regular direct routes towards Ottawa travel via Greber. The STO has built three park-and-ride facilities in the vicinity so that passengers can take advantage of the transit priority measures. Express buses employ a closed-door policy in which they generally skip the stops in the designated lane section. The STO is looking at the possibility of extending the reserved lanes further north.

North of Boulevard La Verendrye, it becomes a two-lane arterial road that runs beside Autoroute 50 for much of its length until it ends near the Terrasses Paiement/Ravin Boises residential neighbourhood at Montee Paiement just south of the Highway 50 interchange. It is also the site of the Gatineau sector's largest industrial sector (second behind the Richelieu Industrial Park in the Hull sector). The northern and eastern end of the road was formerly called Rue Scullion prior to the 2002 amalgamation that formed a new larger City of Gatineau.

Les Promenades Gatineau, Ottawa-Gatineau's largest shopping centre is located on the east side of the road south of Boulevard Maloney. Costco built a new store right beside Gréber in 2006, and moved their operations there from a location in the northern part of the city. Several other malls such as the Village Greber and Place de la Savane are located beside and across from Les Promenades, making the area the most important commercial zone in the old city of Gatineau.

Near the Lady Aberdeen Bridges is one of the most historical churches in the Outaouais region, the St-Francois de Sales church, which was built in 1840.

== History ==
At the end of the 19th century, when the Gatineau Bridge was build in 1894 connecting Pointe-Gatineau to Hull, the bridge road stopped at River Street (today Jacques Cartier Street). The only way up north was through Saint-Antoine Street or the way west was to take Kings Road (old 148) that would curve into the old 148 (today Saint-Louis Street).

By the beginning of the 20th century, a road was built joining directly the now renamed Lady Aberdeen Bridge (Gatineau Bridge) to Saint-Louis Street (old 148) that went only west at the time. Saint-Antoine Street still went up north and was the only road in that direction then.

As the years went by and the town grew and expanded, more streets needed to be added. The initial conceptual phase and subsequent planning of what became Boulevard Gréber took place between 1945 and 1950, directly stemming from the Major National Capital planning works of French urban architect Jacques Gréber. Property construction data shows that initial residential and structural layouts along the corridor began emerging as early as 1947. Following his widespread urban planning layout for the National Capital Region published in 1950, individual arterial road segments were systematically integrated and cleared to prioritize the area's mid-century shift toward an automobile-centric culture. Initial footprint shows a narrow, minor arterial layout.

Then in 1969, due to the rising population and trafic, the National Capital Commission and provincial authorities formally launched a coordinated regional expansion program. This 1969 initiative heavily altered the original phase, widening the route into a full four-lane commercial boulevard running from the former intersection of Archambault/Saint-Louis (today only known as Saint-Louis since the city merging of Gatineau of 2002) area in Pointe-Gatineau up to Maloney boulevard.

By 1976, when plans were finalized and site preparation began for the construction of the Les Promenades de l'Outaouais Mall (today the Les Promenades Gatineau Mall), Saint-Antoine Street was cut and closed off to vehicular north of De La Savane Road. Above Boulevard Maloney, Gréber would curve into what used to be part of the northern part of Saint-Antoine Street, merging both of them into one.

The last section to complete Boulevard Gréber would only come after the 2002 amalgamation when the modern day city of Gatineau was created after the merging of 1 January 2002, as the case of many cities across the country, creating many Greater Areas. The section of rue Scullion that started at Montée Paiement all the way to where Boulevard Gréber stopped before would now be officialize as only one, giving it the whole name of Gréber.

== Greber and Maloney intersection ==
The intersection with Maloney is considered one of the busiest and most congested across the city as motorists often form long lineups waiting to turn north or south onto Gréber. It is also considered one of the most dangerous intersections, because the traffic flow is very high and train tracks are located just to the north of the intersection. Several serious incidents, some fatal, have occurred in the past several years.

The intersection will also be the site of significant construction as the STO is planning to build its Rapibus transit roadway alongside the tracks, and a station called Gréber is also part of the plans. The construction will likely affect travel in the area in a couple of years.

== Neighbourhoods ==
- Pointe-Gatineau
- Le Baron
- Du Carrefour
- Ravins Boises-Terrasses Paiement

== See also ==
- List of Gatineau roads
