= Maisonneuve Boulevard =

Canadian street

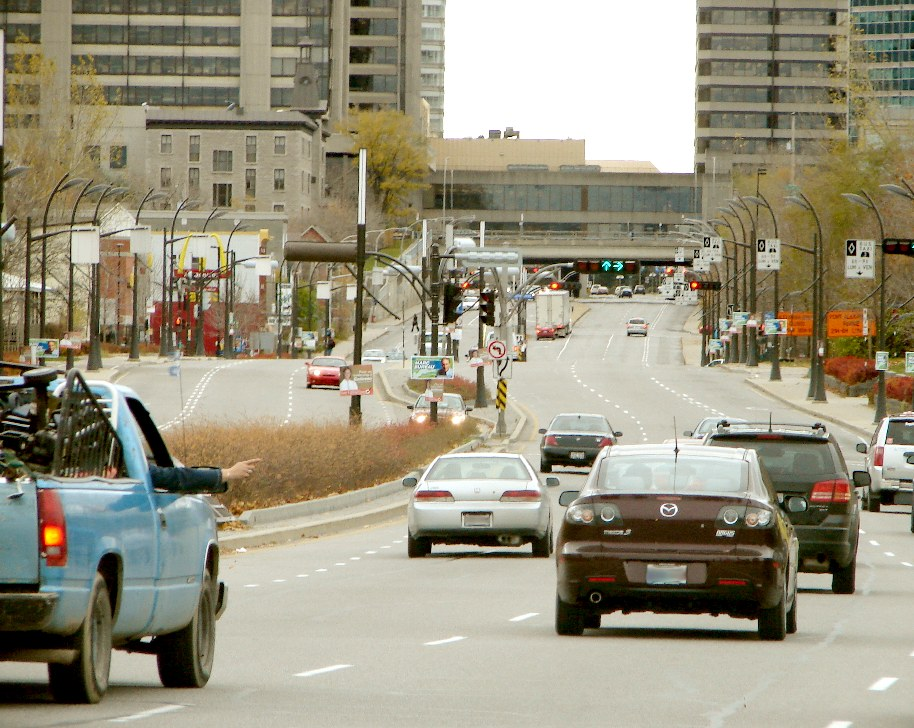
Boulevard Maisonneuve in Hull with the Place-du-Portage and Place-du-Centre in the background.

Boulevard Maisonneuve is an important arterial in the heart of downtown Gatineau, Quebec. It serves as connector route between the Portage Bridge from Ottawa to Quebec Autoroutes 5 and 50 as well as Boulevard Fournier towards the Gatineau sector of the city, northern portions of the Hull sector and the northern east suburbs. It also gives access to the Macdonald-Cartier Bridge and the Alexandra Bridge (via Boulevard des Allumettières formerly Boulevard Saint-Laurent).

== History ==
The construction of this road was a source of controversy in the 1960s and 1970s. The entire area where Boulevard Maisonneuve is now located was a residential area with a large number of houses that were built early in the 20th century. At that time, there was an urgent need for a main road to be built because the Quebec side of the National Capital Region was growing very rapidly and more commuters were driving from the suburbs towards downtown Hull. During the 1970s, several federal government offices buildings such as Place du Portage, Place du Centre, the City Hall and the Congress Centre were built in the downtown area of what was then the City of Hull. In addition, numerous skyscrapers were built in downtown Ottawa increasing the amount of commuter traffic towards central Ottawa from both sides of the river.

The controversial decision was then made to demolish a long line of houses in order to make room for the new arterial boulevard, thus making commuter travel towards Ottawa much easier. At the same time the Portage Bridge was built at the southern end of Maisonneuve towards Wellington Street and the Kichi Zibi Mikan in Ottawa.

== 2000s ==
Boulevard Maisonneuve is a 6-lane road from Rue Laurier to Boulevard Sacre-Coeur where it splits with Boulevard Fournier and Autoroute 5 towards Ottawa. South of Rue Laurier it becomes the Portage Bridge, part of the National Capital Region's Confederation Boulevard. During rush hours, one lane is reserved for STO and OC Transpo buses, taxis and carpooling (with at least 3 people per vehicle). The speed limit is 50 km/h but traffic flow during off-peak hours is generally much faster. It is busy due to its connection to Autoroute 5.

=== Recent road and condominium projects ===
Today, the City of Gatineau along with the National Capital Commission have modernized the road between Highway 5 and des Allumettières. They have already made some significant landscape changes on the road surface with wider sidewalks and numerous planters, new traffic lights and new benches. At the same time, the city is replacing several older houses with new condominium projects to give the road a much more modern look. The latest update was a project to construct new units at the corner of Boulevard des Allumettières. These will replace two or three very old units nearby. The City tries not to mix different types of units (which means not mixing early 20th century houses with more modern ones); however, this may be only a tactic to hide the poorer areas of the city, since the downtown area is considered to be the poorest in all of Gatineau. However, there are still numerous old structures in rough shape that are located along the eastern side of the route.

== See also ==
- List of Gatineau roads
