= Cégep de l'Outaouais =

Public college in Gatineau, Quebec

CEGEP de l'Outaouais
- Motto: Ton premier rôle
- Motto in English: Your first role
- Type: Public CEGEP
- Established: 1967
- Academic affiliations: ACCC, AUCC
- Principal: Steve Brabant
- Administrative staff: 932 (including 506 teachers) (2020)
- Students: about 5,000 students (2017)
- Undergraduates: pre-university students; technical
- Location: 333, boulevard de la Cité-des-Jeunes; Gatineau, Quebec; J8Y 6M4; 45°27′27.64″N 75°45′59.88″W
- Campus: Gabrielle-Roy (Hull sector + headquarters), Felix-Leclerc (Gatineau sector) & Louis-Reboul (Hull sector)
- Colours: Blue & black
- Nickname: The Griffons
- Sporting affiliations: CCAA, QSSF
- Website: cegepoutaouais.qc.ca

Cégep de l'Outaouais (formerly known as Collège de l'Outaouais) is a Canadian college. It is the biggest public college (CEGEP) in the Outaouais region and is located in the city of Gatineau, Quebec. In 2002, about 75% of the region's high school graduates had been admitted to the institution. As of 2012 there were over 5,000 students attending the college. 2017 saw similar student numbers; that year also saw the 70,000th student graduate from the college.

== Partnership ==
The College of General and Vocational Education is affiliated with the ACCC, and CCAA.

== Campus ==
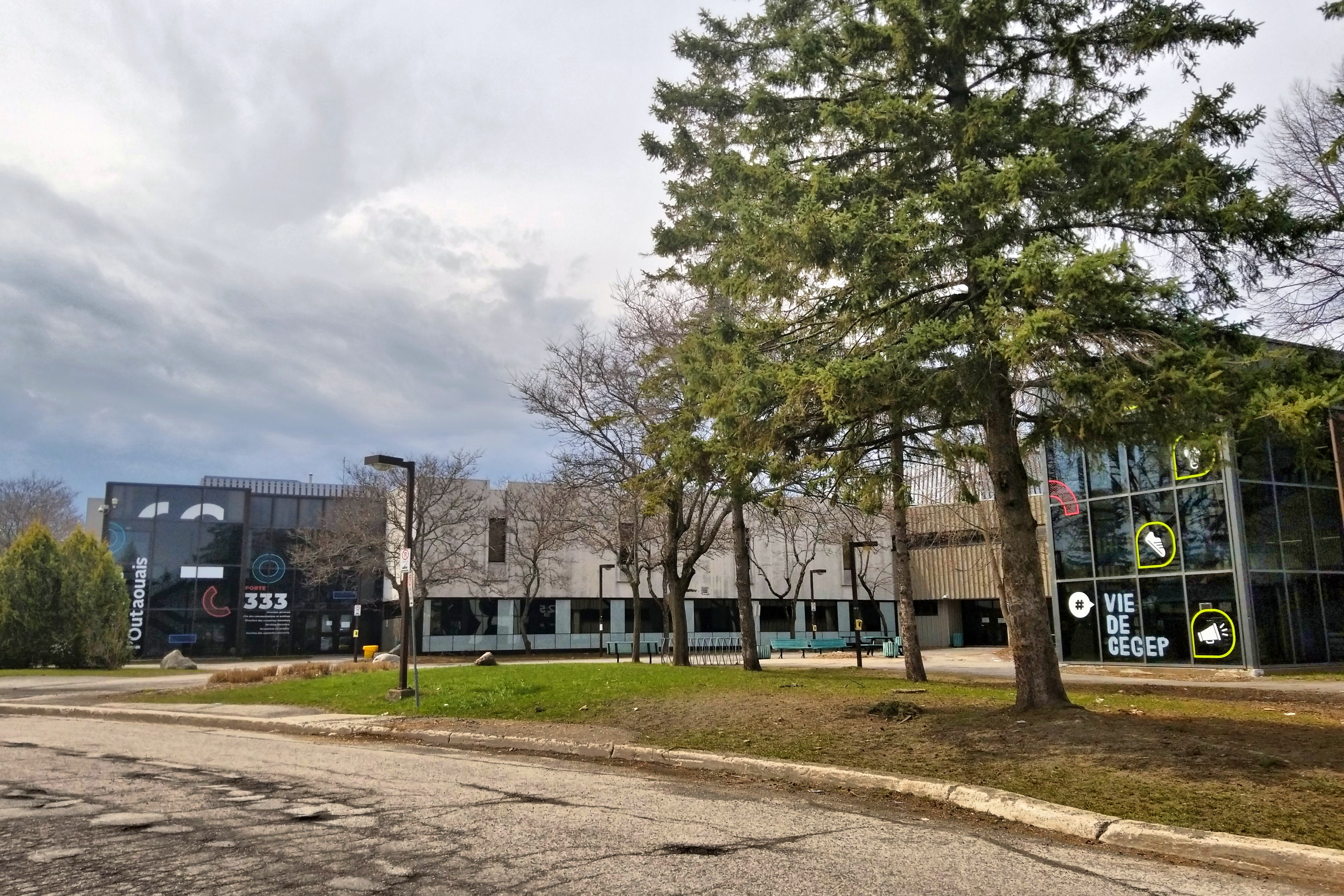
The main campus, Gabrielle-Roy, in the Hull, Quebec

The Cégep provides teaching in French and consists of two separate, sister entities. The main campus, Gabrielle-Roy, is located on Boulevard de la Cité-des-Jeunes in the Hull sector. The second campus, Felix-Leclerc, is located in the Gatineau sector on Boulevard de la Gappe. There is also a third much smaller campus called Louis-Reboul located on Boulevard Sacré-Coeur in the downtown sector.

== History ==
The institution of what would become the CEGEP de l'Outaouais was founded in 1967. The Quebec government under the Union Nationale with Daniel Johnson Sr. as premier, implemented a network of 12 CEGEPs, a college educational level to replace classic courses that were abolished during the Quiet Revolution Era. During this time it incorporated several institutions that were previously under the jurisdiction of the Roman Catholic Church. It included the Institut de Technologie de Hull, the Collège classique Marguerite-D'Youville, for girls, the Collège classique Marie-Médiatrice, for boys, the École normale de Hull, the Institut familiale de Hull and finally the École des Infirmières de l'Hopital Sacré-Coeur. It was known until 1975 as the CEGEP de Hull. It was then known as the CEGEP de l'Outaouais up until 1984, when it changed to Collège de l'Outaouais. In 2004, the name Cégep de l'Outaouais was restored.

== Programs ==
The Province of Quebec awards a Diploma of Collegial Studies for two types of programs: two years of pre-university studies or three years of vocational (technical) studies. The pre-university programs, which take two years to complete, cover the subject matters which roughly correspond to the additional year of high school given elsewhere in Canada and one year of university with a focus on the student's chosen field. As a result, students who complete a Diploma of Collegial Studies usually only take 3 years to complete a bachelor's degree. The technical programs, which take three-years to complete, applies to students who wish to pursue a skill trade. In addition Continuing education and services to business are provided.

The Cégep has several pre-university programs as well as technical programs. Among pre-university courses includes : humanities (three branches), natural sciences, "sciences, letters & arts" and "arts and letters". Technical programs includes, police techniques, computer sciences, multimedia, administration, office automation, dental hygiene, health sciences, documentation, mechanical engineering, interior design, etc. Most technical courses are offered at the Gabrielle-Roy campus only, while most pre-university programs are offered at both Gabrielle-Roy and Felix-Leclerc.

While French is the main teaching language at the institution, there are also courses offered in English, Spanish, German and Mandarin. Most of them are given in the Arts and Letters program.

== Sports ==
The Cégep de l'Outaouais' varsity teams are called the Griffons. The Cégep has teams in men's hockey D1, men's and women's volleyball, men's and women's basketball, men's and women's badminton, men's and women's soccer, and most recently football. The Gabrielle-Roy campus has several sporting facilities including two gymnasium, a swimming pool and a weightlifting room.

== Extracurriculars ==
The student newspaper is named L'Entremetteur (roughly, The Intermediary).

== Notable graduates ==
- Yves Ducharme
- Pierre Lapointe

== See also ==
- List of colleges in Quebec
- Higher education in Quebec
