= Saint-Joseph Boulevard (Gatineau) =

Street in Hull, Québec, Canada

Boulevard Saint-Joseph
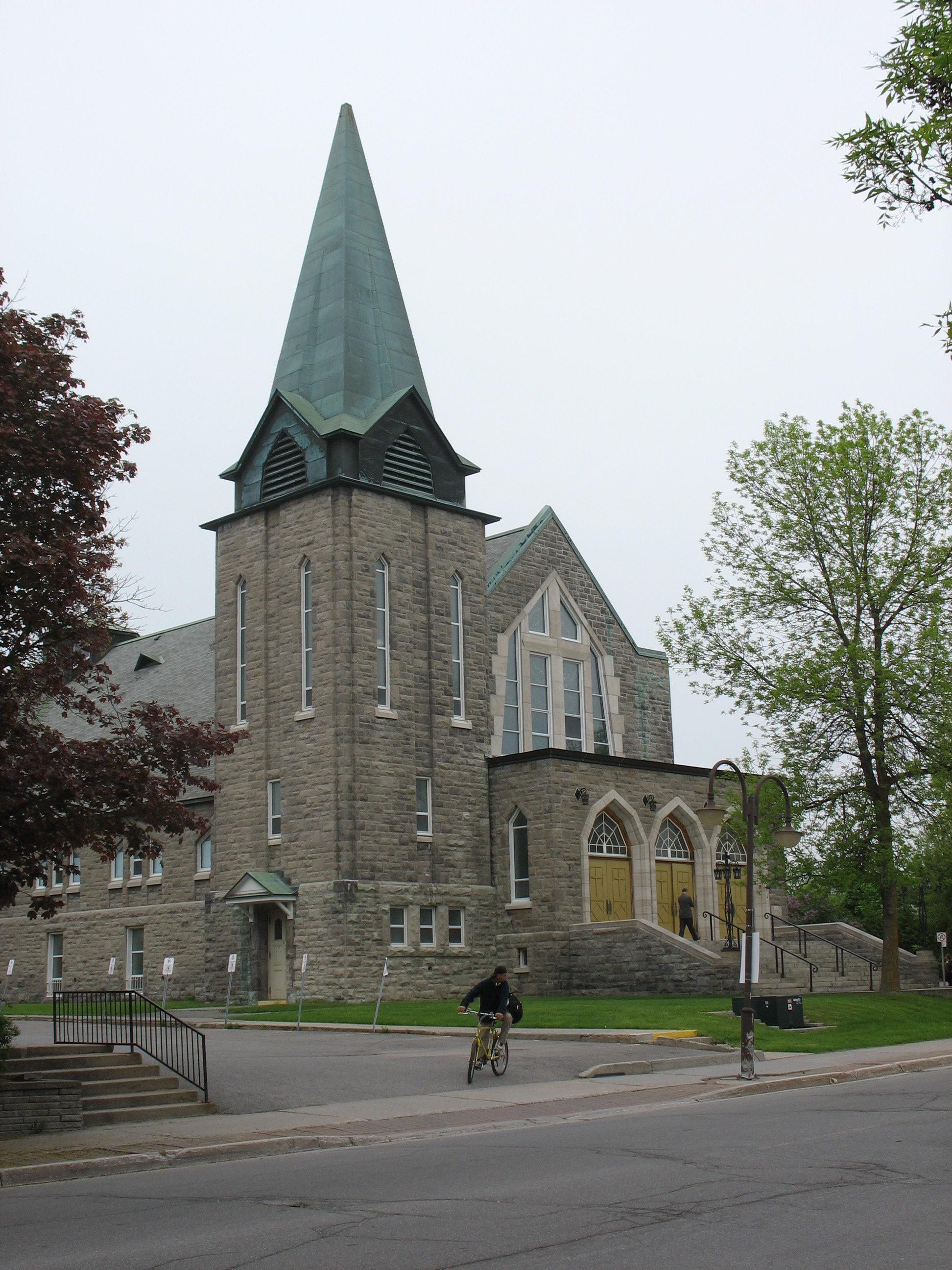
- A church at Boulevard Saint-Joseph near the former Terminus d'autobus de Gatineau.
- Part of: R-105
- South end: Boulevard Alexandre-Taché, Gatineau

Boulevard Saint-Joseph is a commercial boulevard in the former city of Hull (now in Gatineau), Quebec. It runs from Boulevard Alexandre-Taché to the boundaries of the Gatineau and the suburban town of Chelsea. The road was named after Saint-Joseph-de-Hull parish.

== Southern section ==
The road, also known as Route 105, which travels all the way to Route 117 in Grand-Remous, north of Maniwaki, travels through a commercial district. Numerous types of businesses are along the road. Most of them are small independent companies by local entrepreneurs for the Association professionnelle des gens d'affaires de Hull. However, in recent years, their number dropped because of the development of the Plateau de la Capitale commercial district in which big-box stores have been built and because of the booming residential development in the area, which drove away many customers from the Saint Joseph commercial strip.

At the road's southern end is the Salaberry Armoury, with a militia from the Hull regiment, and the Parc des Chars de Combat. Both of Université du Québec en Outaouais's campuses are also just off the road.

Two roundabouts were built in 2004 and 2005, one at rue Montcalm and the other at boulevard des Allumettières (formerly boulevard Saint-Laurent) that has served as a direct link to the Aylmer sector and Le Plateau since Route 148 was turned into a freeway in the fall of 2007.

== Central section ==
There are also two shopping centres near Boulevard Saint-Raymond. The first is Les Galeries de Hull, built in 1972 and owned by Ivanhoé Cambridge, which includes 75 stores. The other mall is Village Place Cartier. Near both malls is a Maxi superstore and a strip mall called Place Fleur de Lys. The Auberge de la gare is a nearby hotel. A 21-story building, Place Vincent Massey, is also in the same area.

There are also some residential sections, including three apartment blocks called Le Blackburn, Place Versailles, and Le 700 St-Joseph, all of which have 16 floors.

The intersection of Boulevard Saint-Joseph and Boulevard Saint-Raymond is one of the most congested intersections in Gatineau during afternoon peak hours and during weekends since it has heavy traffic going to Aylmer via Boulevard Saint-Raymond and to Ottawa and Gatineau via Autoroute 5. Drivers heading to Highway 5 often block the intersection, which results lengthy delays on Saint-Joseph northbound. The traffic jam is also caused by the configuration of the junction of southbound Highway 5 with eastbound Autoroute 50 since there is only one lane of traffic to access the 50, and traffic must change lanes immediately.

== Northern section ==
North of the junction of Autoroute 5, Boulevard Saint-Joseph is also known as Boulevard de l'Automobile (Car Boulevard) because of the numerous car dealerships on this stretch all the way towards Chelsea. Retailers from Honda, Toyota, Suzuki, Subaru, Nissan, Hyundai, and Nissan are also on the road, as well as the auction dealership, Mega Auto. Every spring, a portion of the road is closed to traffic on a particular Sunday for a sale involving most of those retailers. In the same area was the southern terminus of Hull-Chelsea-Wakefield steam train line.

== Transportation ==
Many of the city's Société de transport de l'Outaouais's routes travels on the stretch of road near the shopping district near Saint-Raymond and Montclair as well as near a park and ride facility at the corner of Chemin Freeman.

The speed limit throughout this stretch is 50 km/h. When the road exits Gatineau, the speed limit is 70 km/h.

== Neighbourhoods ==
- St-Jean Bosco
- Wrightville
- Parc de la Montagne/St-Raymond
- Mont-Bleu
- Hautes Plaines

== See also ==
- List of Gatineau roads
- Saint Joseph Boulevard (disambiguation)
