= Le Plateau, Gatineau =

Plateau
- Urban Village
- Le Plateau
- Interactive map of Plateau

Area
  - Land: 7,847,622 km^{2} (3,029,984 sq mi)

Population
  - Total: 23,988
- Time zone: UTC-5 (Eastern Standard Time)
  - Summer (DST): UTC−4 (EDT)

Le Plateau (also known as Plateau, or Du Plateau) is a neighbourhood and an urban village in Gatineau, located west of downtown Hull, in the Ottawa area of Canada. The neighbourhood is limited to Gatineau Park to the north, chemin Vanier to the west, Boulevard Saint-Raymond to the east and Boulevard des Allumettières to the south. It consists mostly of houses, but many shopping centres find their home at Plateau.

Le Plateau is located south of Gatineau Park, one of the biggest urban parks in the world. It also contains the Gatineau Hills and does not border any major body of water.

== Education ==
There are elementary schools in the Plateau such as l'École du Plateau, des Deux-Ruisseaux, du Grand-Héron, de l'Amérique-Française, du Marais. There are also secondary schools, such as La Cité, D'Arcy Symmes, etc.
