= Saint-Raymond Boulevard =

Road in Gatineau, Quebec, Canada

Boulevard Saint-Raymond
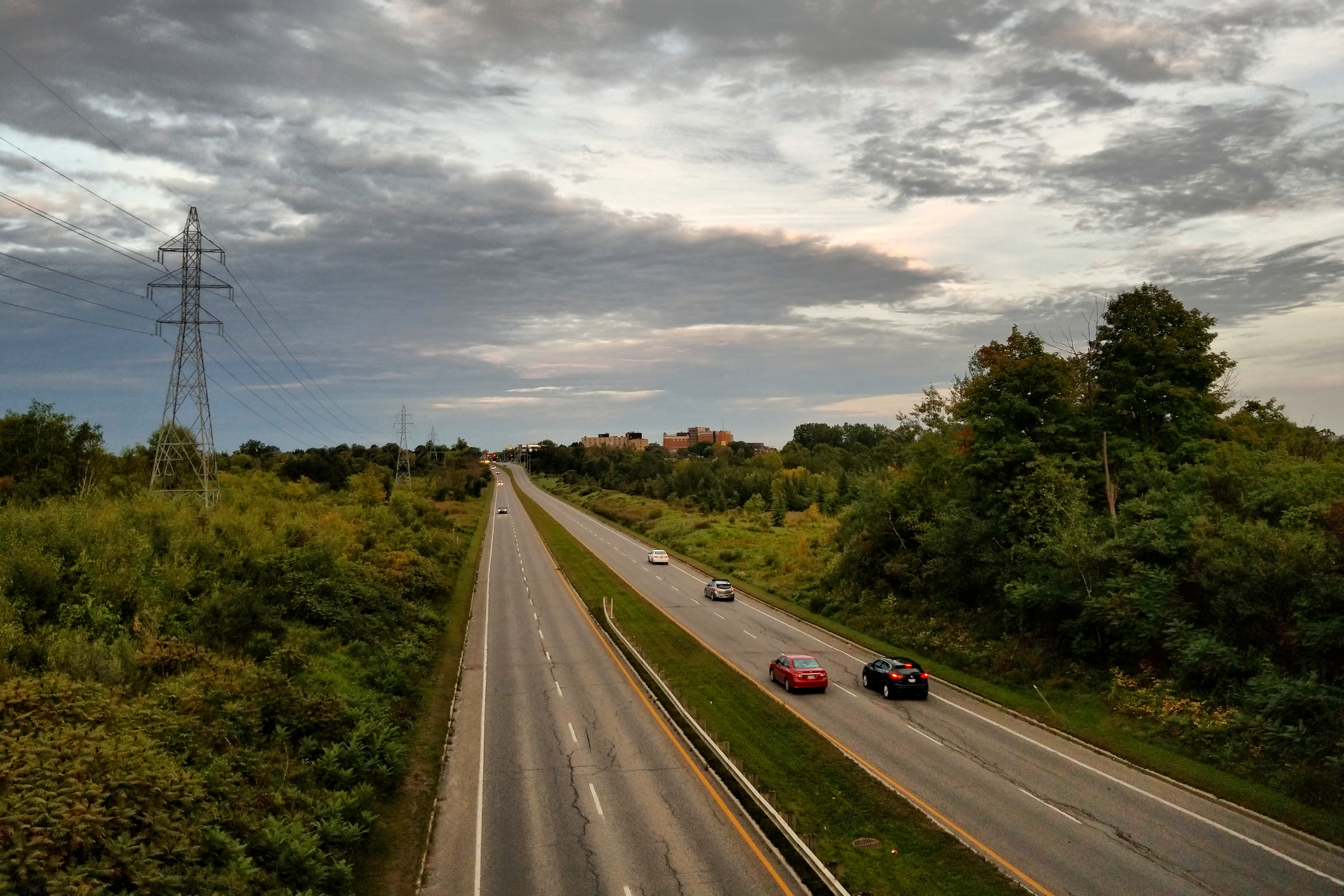

Location
- Country: Canada
- Province: Quebec
- Major cities: Gatineau

Highway system
- Quebec provincial highways; Autoroutes; List; Former

Boulevard Saint-Raymond is a major boulevard located in Gatineau, Quebec. It starts at Boulevard Saint-Joseph and ends at Boulevard Alexandre-Tache just west of the limits between the Hull and Aylmer sectors. Before 2003, it ended at Chemin Pink but since then it includes the former section of Chemin de la Montagne Sud.

Chemin de la Montagne also used to have a northern section which started from Chemin Pink and ended in Luskville in the Les Collines-de-l'Outaouais region. In the past, it also used to run all the way to the Casino du Lac-Leamy before it was renamed Boulevard du Casino east of Saint-Joseph.

== Name ==
Boulevard Saint-Raymond takes its name from the parish of the same name founded in 1942 in Hull.

== Eastern section ==
The eastern section passes between two residential areas and is often very crowded (if not overcrowded), especially in the rush hours, where long lineups can be seen as motorists head towards Autoroute 5 (also caused by the lack of adequate access to Autoroute 50). There is also heavy volume near Cite-des-Jeunes Boulevard and it is sometimes congested due to the increasing amount of traffic heading towards Le Plateau.

There have also been complaints of speeding during the night as numerous motorists are traveling at very high speed in that stretch due to a hill.

== Southern Section ==
After passing Boulevard de la Cite-des-Jeunes, it becomes a four-lane divided road (near freeway status) crossing Gatineau Park.

Its southern section is also very busy as it connects with the growing community of Plateau de la Capitale (which is also home to numerous big-box and department stores as well as a movie theatre) and also Boulevard des Allumettières (formerly Boulevard de l'Outaouais) a major freeway. Traffic is especially heavy during the weekend due to shoppers heading towards the commercial district on Boulevard du Plateau.

Meanwhile, there is construction currently underway on the boulevard. Boulevard des Allumetières, which will run under the Saint-Raymond overpass will be extended westwards to connect to Boulevard Saint-Laurent (which its segment was renamed des Allumettières after the completion of the project) and the downtown area in 2007. The current intersection with the freeway is part of an interchange that will be completed with the other portion to be at the intersection of Boulevard du Plateau.

== Neighbourhoods ==
- Manoir des Trembles
- Le Plateau
- Parc de la Montagne
- Lac des Fees

== See also ==
- List of Gatineau roads
