= Quebec Route 148 =

Highway in Quebec

Coordinates: 45.6371°N 74.9748°W

Route 148

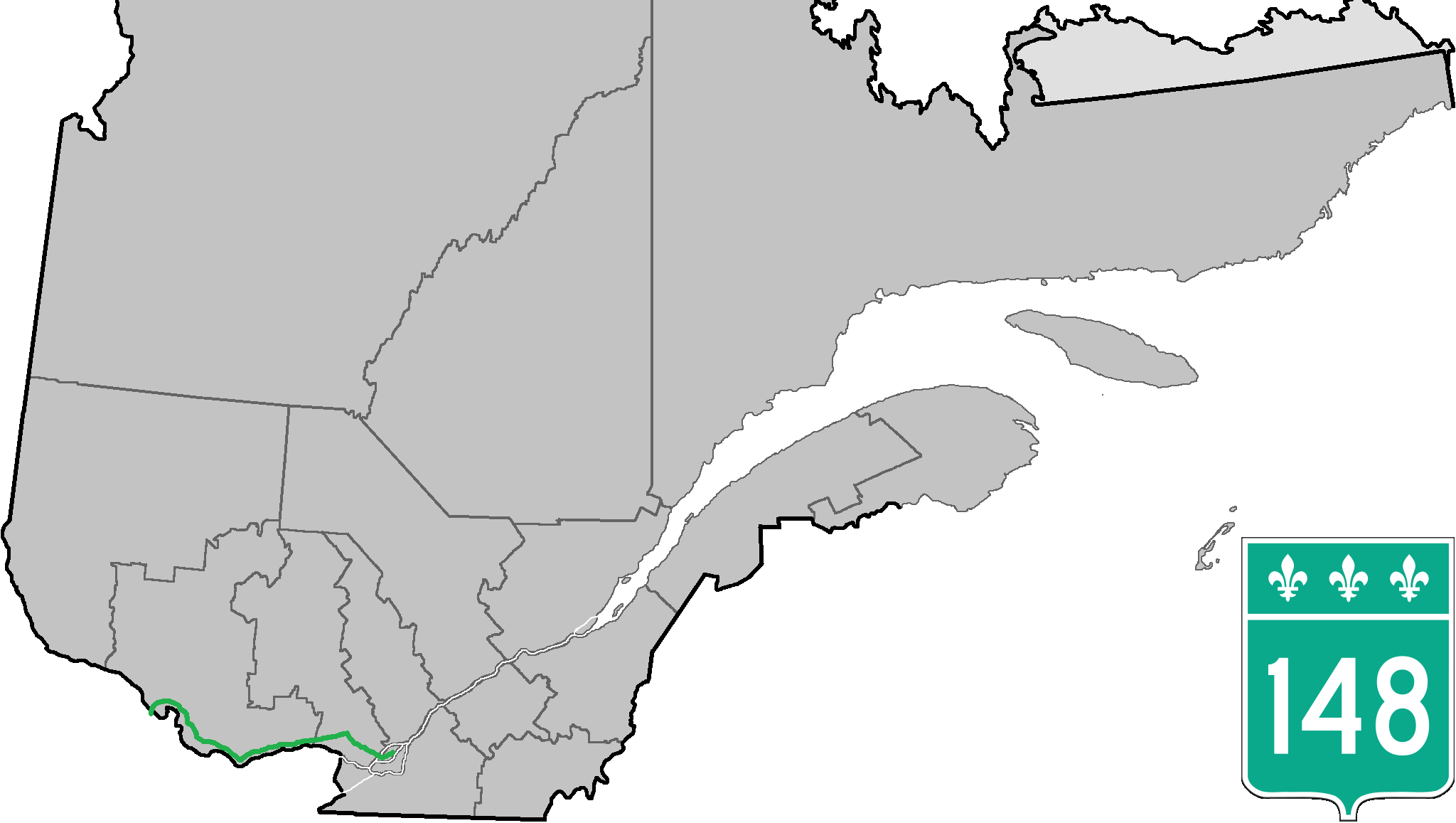

Route information
- Maintained by Transports Québec
- Length: 318 km (198 mi)
- History: Route 8

Major junctions
- West end: Highway 148 at Ontario Border (near Pembroke, ON)
- A-5 / A-50 in Gatineau; A-50 in Brownsburg-Chatham; R-158 in Lachute; A-50 / R-158 in Mirabel; A-640 in Saint-Eustache
- East end: A-13 / A-440 in Laval

Location
- Country: Canada
- Province: Quebec

Highway system
- Quebec provincial highways; Autoroutes; List; Former
← R-147	→ R-153

Route 148 is an east-west highway in Quebec, Canada. It runs from junction of Autoroute 13 and Autoroute 440 in Laval in the Montreal region to the Ontario-Quebec border in L'Isle-aux-Allumettes in western Quebec. For most of its length, Route 148 follows the north shore of the Ottawa River where it acted as the principal route between communities in the Outaouais region until the completion of Autoroute 50 in 2012. At the Ontario-Quebec border in L'Isle-aux-Allumettes Route 148 continues into Ontario as Highway 148.

In Gatineau, Route 148 is concurrent with Autoroute 50 from Maloney Boulevard until the terminus of Autoroute 50 at des Allumettières Boulevard. Route 148 then continues west on des Allumettières Boulevard towards Aylmer. Prior to the opening of des Allumettières Boulevard in 2007, Route 148 was concurrent with Autoroute 5 between the Autoroute 50 junction and Saint-Raymond Boulevard.

The section of Route 148 between Lachute and Buckingham was the only major route on the north shore of the Ottawa River between communities in the eastern Outaouais region and Gatineau and Montreal. This section, especially the section between Masson-Angers and Montebello, has been the site of numerous fatal accidents over the last few years. Construction of Autoroute 50 to the north of Route 148 was completed on November 26, 2012, and now provides a faster and safer route between communities in the eastern Outaouais region and Gatineau and Mirabel.

For many years Route 148 included a section of Rue Principale west of A-13 and most of Boulevard Saint-Martin in Laval until it was decommissioned in 2012.

== Municipalities along Route 148 ==
Municipalities listed in order from west to east:

- L'Isle-aux-Allumettes
- Waltham
- Mansfield-et-Pontefract
- Fort Coulonge
- Litchfield
- Campbell's Bay
- Bryson
- Shawville
- Bristol
- Pontiac
- Gatineau - (Aylmer / Hull / Gatineau / Masson-Angers)
- Lochaber-Partie-Ouest
- Thurso
- Lochaber
- Plaisance
- Papineauville
- Montebello
- Notre-Dame-de-Bonsecours
- Fassett
- Grenville-sur-la-Rouge (Calumet)
- Brownsburg-Chatham
- Lachute
- Mirabel
- Saint-Eustache
- Laval - (Laval-Ouest / Sainte-Dorothée)

== Major intersections ==
RCM	Location	km	mi	Exit	Destinations	Notes
Rivière des Outaouais (Ottawa River)		0.0– 1.6	0.0– 0.99		Highway 148 west – Pembroke	Continuation into Ontario
Rivière des Outaouais (Ottawa River)		0.0– 1.6	0.0– 0.99	Pont Des Allumettes (Allumettes Bridge) (via Île Morrison)		
Pontiac	L'Isle-aux-Allumettes – Waltham boundary	16.9	10.5	Crosses Chenal de la Culbute		
Pontiac	Campbell's Bay	54.3	33.7		R-301 north – Otter Lake, Kazabazua	West end of R-301 concurrency
Pontiac	Litchfield	64.4	40.0		R-301 south – Portage-du-Fort	East end of R-301 concurrency
Pontiac	Shawville	74.4	46.2		R-303 south – Portage-du-Fort	East end of R-303 concurrency
Pontiac	Shawville	75.8	47.1		R-303 north – Ladysmith, Otter Lake	West end of R-303 concurrency
Les Collines-de-l'Outaouais	Quyon	98.7	61.3		Chemin du Lac-des-Loups – Lac-des-Loups, Quyon	Ferry connection to Ottawa (to Ottawa City Road 7 (Ferry Road))
Gatineau		137.3	85.3		Chemin Eardley / Boulevard des Allumettières	R-148 follows Boulevard des Allumettières
Gatineau		146.6	91.1	–	Boulevard Saint-Raymond	Interchange
Gatineau		147.7	91.8	–	Promenade de la Gatineau	Interchange
Gatineau		148.1	92.0	–	Promenade du Lac-des-Fées	Interchange; westbound exit and eastbound entrance
Gatineau		148.4	92.2		Rue Labelle	Roundabout
Gatineau		148.8	92.5		Rue Demontigny	Roundabout
Gatineau		149.0	92.6		Boulevard Saint-Joseph (R-105 north)	Roundabout
Gatineau		149.4	92.8	134	A-50 west (Autoroute Guy-Lafleur) Boulevard des Allumettières – Pont Alexandra, Ottawa	West end of A-50 concurrency; exit numbers follow A-50; no access to A-50 west from R-148 east
Gatineau		150.4– 151.4	93.5– 94.1	135	A-5 – Centre-Ville, Ottawa, Maniwaki	A-5 exit 2; no westbound entrance
Gatineau		152.4	94.7	Pont des Draveurs (Draveurs Bridge) crosses the Gatineau River		
Gatineau		152.6	94.8	138	Rue Saint-Louis (R-307)	
Gatineau		153.5	95.4	139	A-50 west (Autoroute Guy-Lafleur) – Montréal	Eastbound exit and westbound entrance; east end of A-50 concurrency; R-148 follows Boulevard Maloney
Gatineau		155.1	96.4		Boulevard Gréber	
Gatineau		163.1	101.3		Boulevard Lorrain (R-366 north) to A-50	
Gatineau		179.0	111.2		R-315 north (Chemin de Masson) to A-50 – Montréal	
Gatineau		43.0	26.7		Chemin du Quai	Ferry connection to Cumberland (to Ottawa City Road 35)
Papineau	Thurso	194.4	120.8		Rue Galipeau	Ferry connection to Rockland (to Prescott and Russell County Road 8)
Papineau	Thurso	195.3	121.4		R-317 north to A-50 – Ripon, Montpellier	
Papineau	Papineauville	212.6	132.1		R-321 north to A-50 – Saint-André-Avellin	
Papineau	Montebello	219.6	136.5		R-323 north to A-50 – Lac-des-Plages, Mont-Tremblant	
Argenteuil	Grenville-sur-la-Rouge	249.3	154.9		R-344 to A-50 – Grenville, Hawkesbury	
Argenteuil	Brownsburg-Chatham	265.0	164.7		A-50 – Gatineau, Montréal	A-50 exit 254
Argenteuil	Lachute	270.4	168.0		R-327 north (Avenue de la Providence) – Brownsburg-Chatham, Mont-Tremblant	West end of R-327 concurrency
Argenteuil	Lachute	270.6	168.1		R-327 south (Avenue d'Argenteuil) – Saint-Andre-d'Argenteuil	East end of R-327 concurrency
Argenteuil	Lachute	271.2	168.5		R-158 begins To A-50 / Avenue Bethany	R-158 western terminus; west end of R-158 concurrency
Argenteuil	Lachute	273.3	169.8		R-329 south – Saint-Hermas	West end of R-329 concurrency
Argenteuil	Lachute	274.2	170.4		R-329 north – Gore, Morin-Heights	East end of R-329 concurrency
Mirabel		283.1	175.9		R-158 east – Saint-Jérôme	East end of R-158 concurrency
Mirabel		283.9	176.4		A-50 – Gatineau, Montréal	A-50 exit 272
Deux-Montagnes	Saint-Eustache	310.2	192.7		A-640 – Oka, Repentigny	A-640 exit 11
Deux-Montagnes	Saint-Eustache	312.4	194.1		R-344 (Chemin de la Grande-Côte / Rue Saint-Louis)	
Rivière des Mille Îles		312.5– 312.9	194.2– 194.4	Pont Arthur-Sauvé (Arthur Sauvé Bridge)		
Laval		315.8	196.2		Boulevard Arthur-Sauvé / Avenue des Bois	R-148 follows Avenue des Bois
Laval		316.5	196.7		Rue Princeipale	Former R-148 alignment
Laval		318.9	198.2		A-440 east / Montée Champagne	R-148 eastern terminus; A-440 western terminus; continues as A-440
Laval		Former alignment via Rue Principale and Boulevard Saint-Marin				
Laval		322.6	200.5		A-13 – Saint-Eustache, Montréal	Interchange; A-13 exit 12
Laval		325.8	202.4		Boulevard Curé-Labelle (R-117)	
Laval		327.9	203.7		A-15 (TCH) – Saint-Jérôme, Montréal	Interchange; A-15 exit 8
Laval		331.2	205.8		Boulevard des Laurentides (R-335)	
Laval		333.1	207.0		A-19 to R-335 – Bois-des-Filion, Montréal	Interchange; A-19 exit 7
Laval		325.8	202.4		R-125 (Boulevard Pie-IX) / Boulevard Vanier	Interchange; former R-148 eastern terminus
1.000 mi = 1.609 km; 1.000 km = 0.621 mi: Closed/former; Concurrency terminus; Incomplete access; Route transition

== Images ==
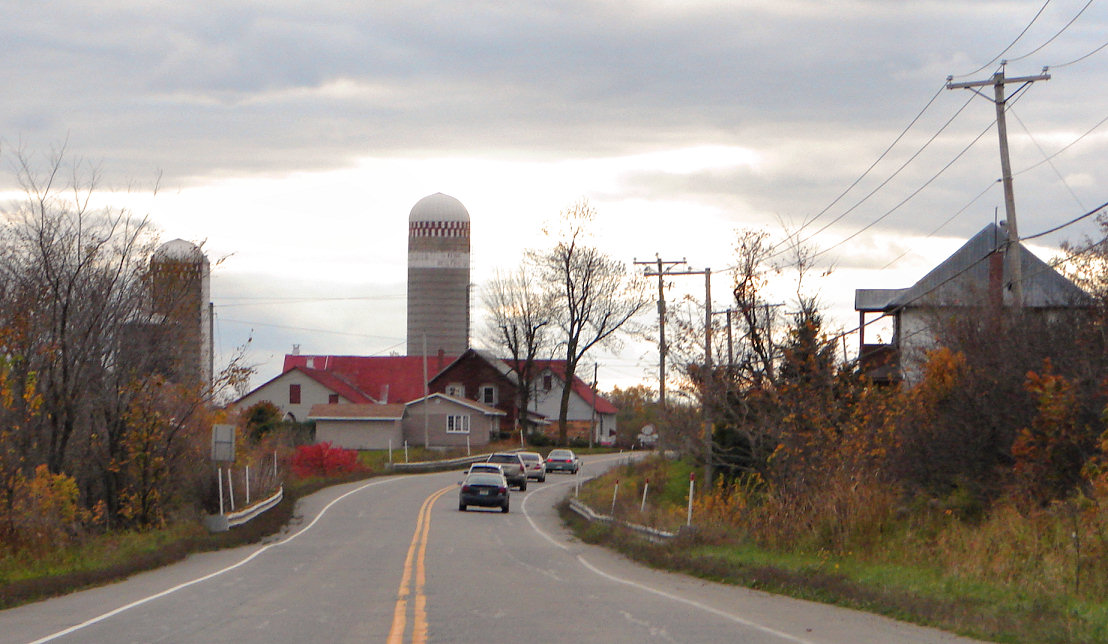
Rte. 148 through Lochaber.

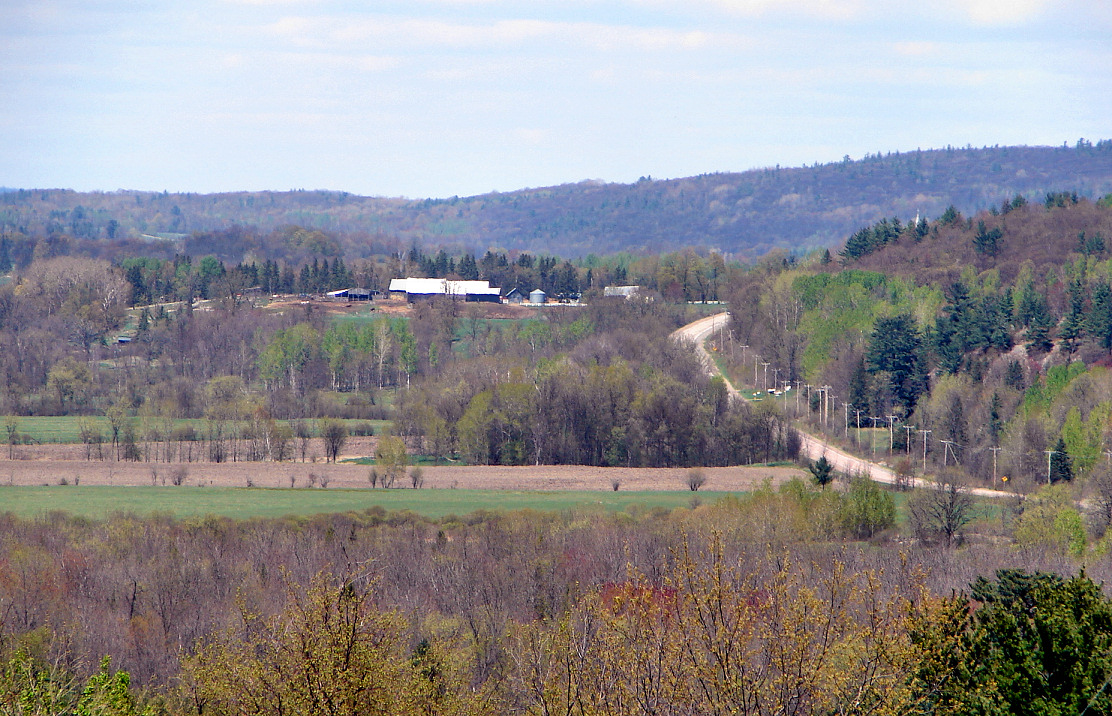
Route 148 as seen from the roadside rest stop in Litchfield.

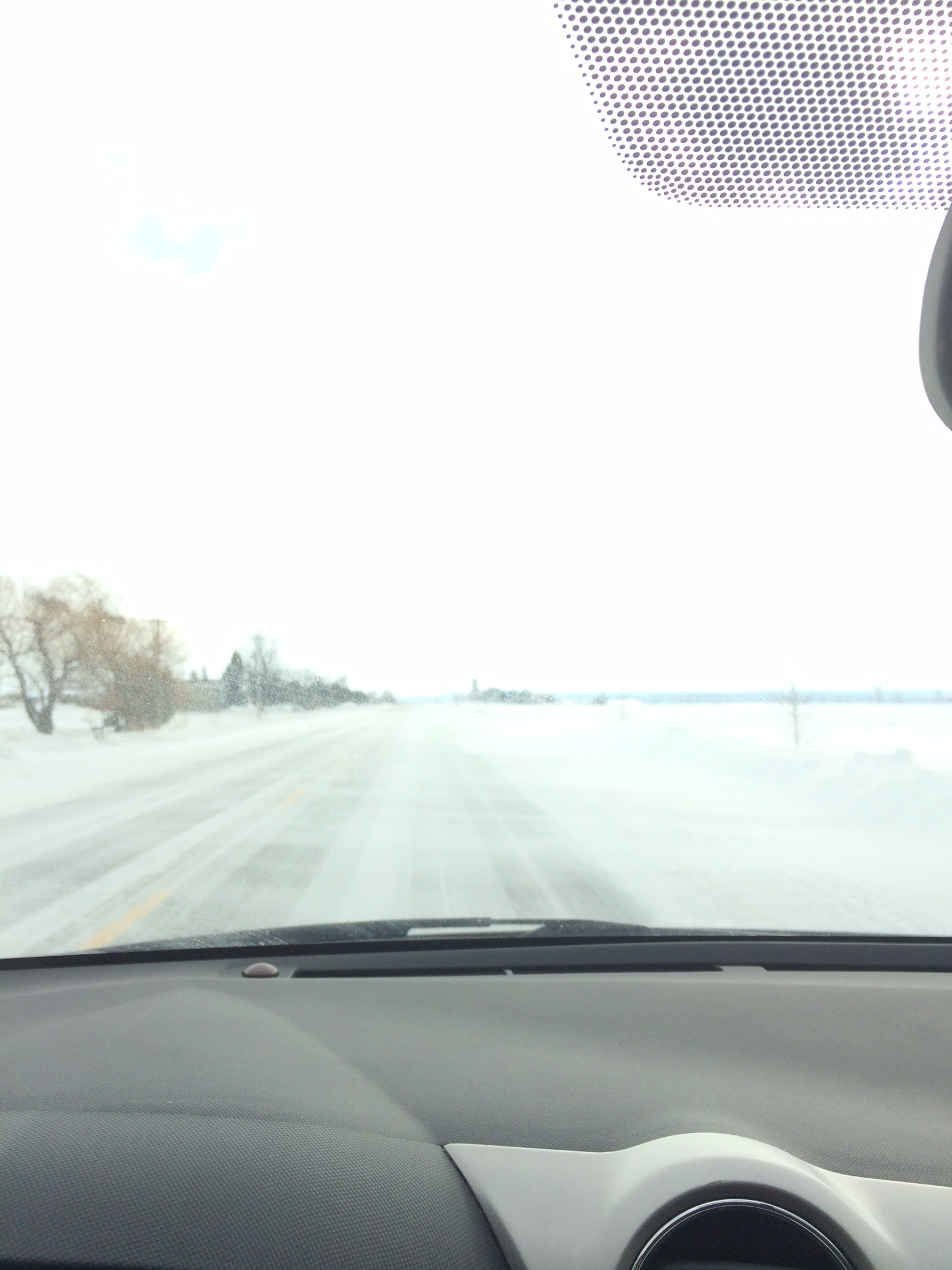
View on Route 148 east bound during snowstorm in Mirabel.

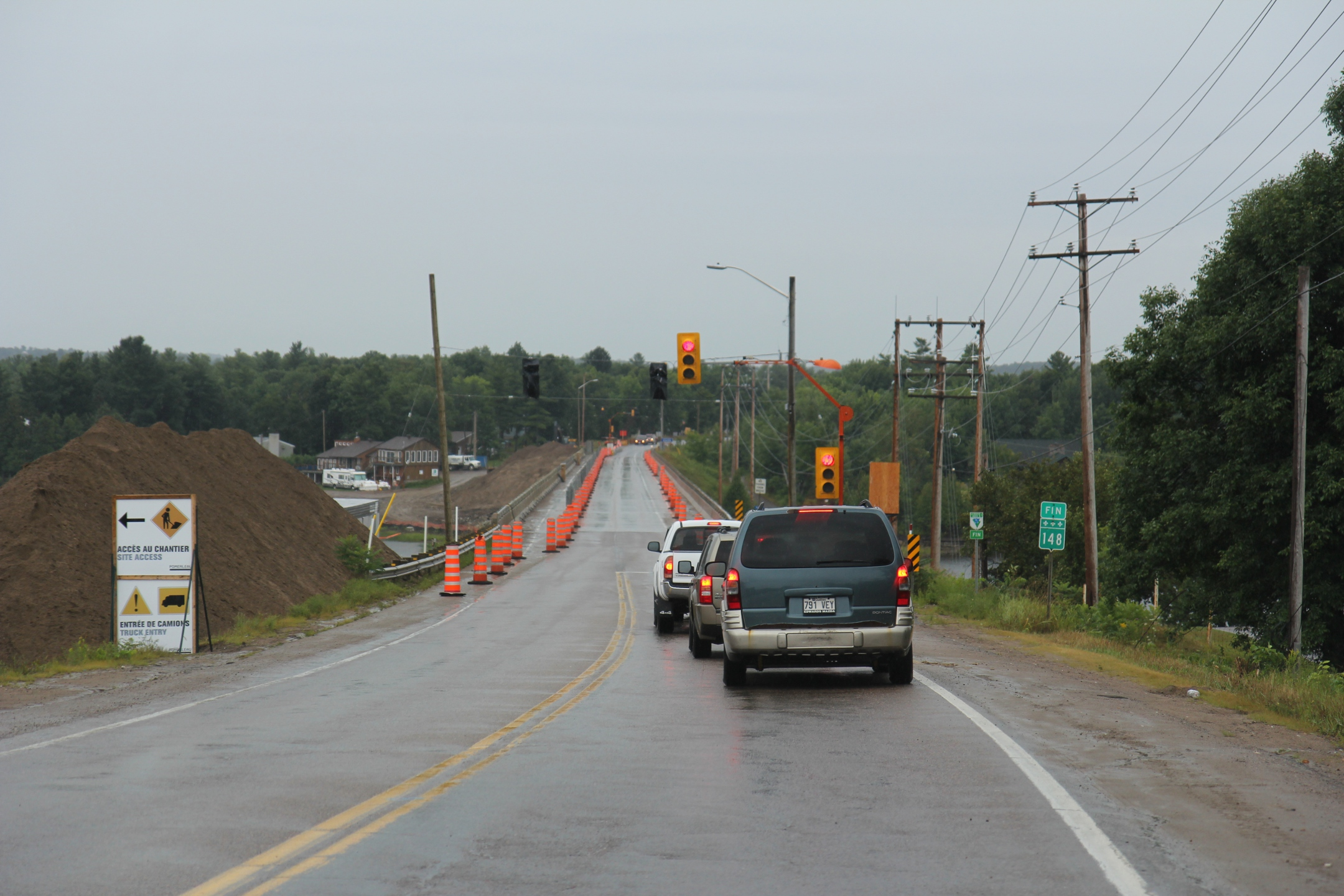
Western terminus, under construction, on Allumette Island

== See also ==
- List of Quebec provincial highways
