= Alexandra Bridge =

Steel truss cantilever bridge connecting Ottawa, Ontario, and Gatineau, Quebec

Alexandra Bridge (French: Pont Alexandra)
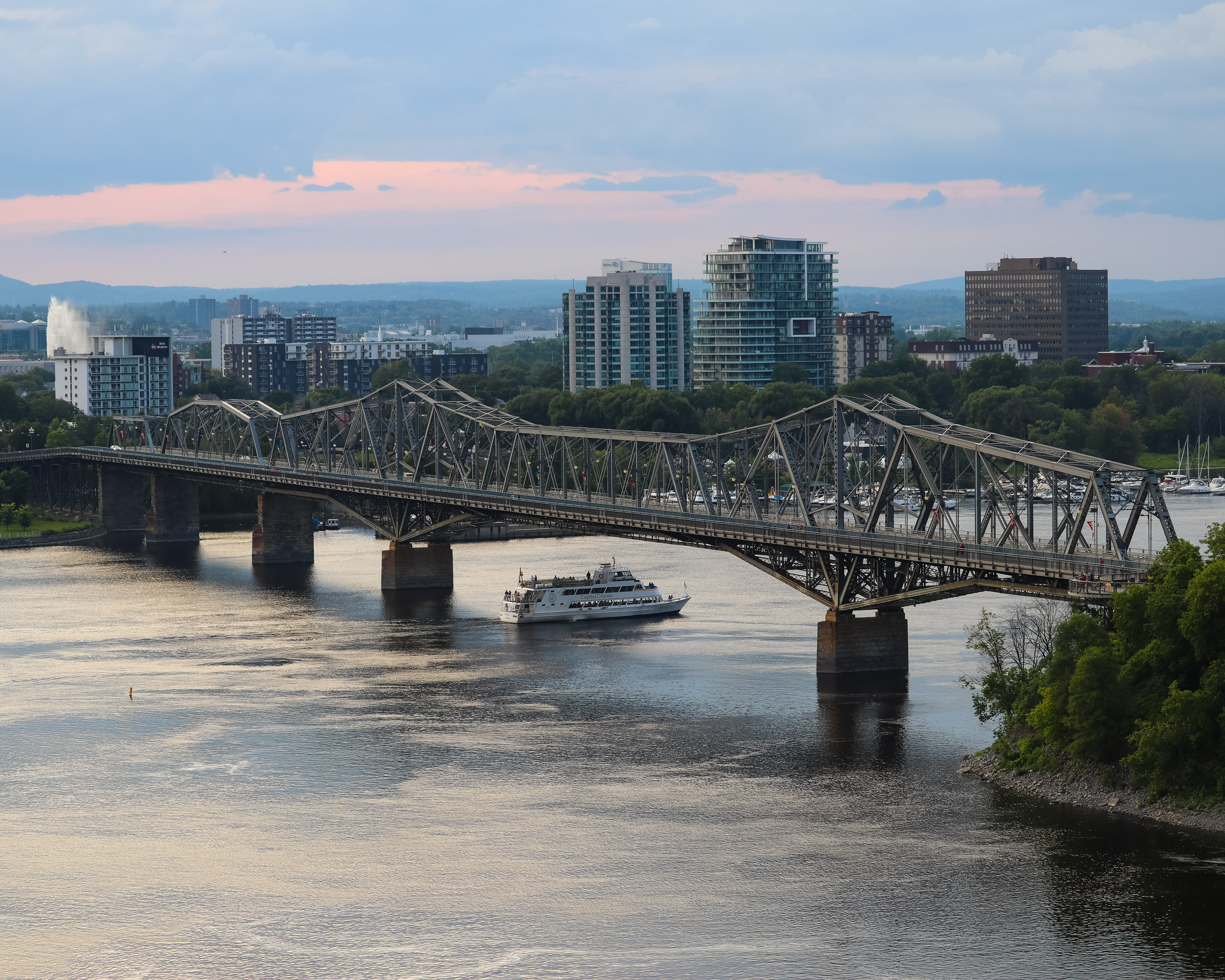
- The Alexandra Bridge seen from Parliament Hill
- Coordinates: 45°25′49″N 75°42′16″W
- Carries: 2 lanes connecting Boulevard des Allumettières and St. Patrick Street/Murray Street, pedestrians
- Crosses: Ottawa River
- Official name: Royal Alexandra Interprovincial Bridge (French: Pont interprovincial Royal Alexandra)
- Other name(s): Interprovincial Bridge (French: Pont Interprovincial)
- Maintained by: Public Services and Procurement Canada

Characteristics
- Design: truss bridge with five spans
- Total length: 563.27 m (1,848 ft)
- Width: 18.89 m (62 ft)
- Height: 28.95 m (95 ft)
- Longest span: main cantilever span: 172.21 m (556 ft)
- Clearance below: Ottawa River

History
- Construction start: 1899
- Construction end: December 12, 1900
- Opened: February 18, 1901

Statistics
- Daily traffic: 22,000/day
- Toll: None

Location
- Interactive map of Alexandra Bridge (French: Pont Alexandra)

The Royal Alexandra Interprovincial Bridge (French: Pont interprovincial Royal Alexandra), also known as the Alexandra Bridge (French: Pont Alexandra) or Interprovincial Bridge (French: Pont Interprovincial), is a steel truss cantilever bridge spanning the Ottawa River between Ottawa, Ontario and Gatineau, Quebec. In addition to carrying vehicle traffic, a shared use pathway on the bridge for pedestrians and cyclists is maintained by the National Capital Commission.

The bridge was designated by the Canadian Society for Civil Engineering a National Historic Civil Engineering Site in June 1995. It was owned by the Canadian Pacific Railway until it was taken over by the National Capital Commission in 1970. It is now owned by the Government of Canada and maintained by Public Services and Procurement Canada (PSPC).

In 2019, the Canadian government directed that the bridge was to be replaced by the year 2032, not without raising questions on the soundness of the decision, both inside and outside the government. The bridge was closed for vehicles from October 2023 till February 2025 as essential rehabilitation and repair work was being completed.

== History ==
The bridge was constructed by the Canadian Pacific Railway between 1898 and 1900. Four barges were built to move steel beams into position. During the winter (1899–1900) workmen toiled day and night chopping channels to keep the ice clear for the barges to pass so that work could continue on the superstructure. Considerable construction delays were caused by the severe winter conditions. By September 1900 the four fixed support spans were complete. The Canadian Society of Civil Engineers held its annual meeting in Ottawa in order that its members might tour the bridge works and see the preparations being made for placing the centre span. The bridge's main cantilever centre span was, at the time of construction, the longest in Canada and the fourth-longest in the world. Both records are now held by the Quebec Bridge. The centre span was successfully put in place on October 7, and a locomotive made a trial run on December 12, 1900. On February 18, 1901, the bridge was officially inaugurated as the Interprovincial Bridge as it had been built by the Ottawa Interprovincial Bridge Company. The name was changed in September 1901 to the "Royal Alexandra Bridge" in honour of the new Queen during the visit of her son, the Duke of Cornwall and York, later George V.

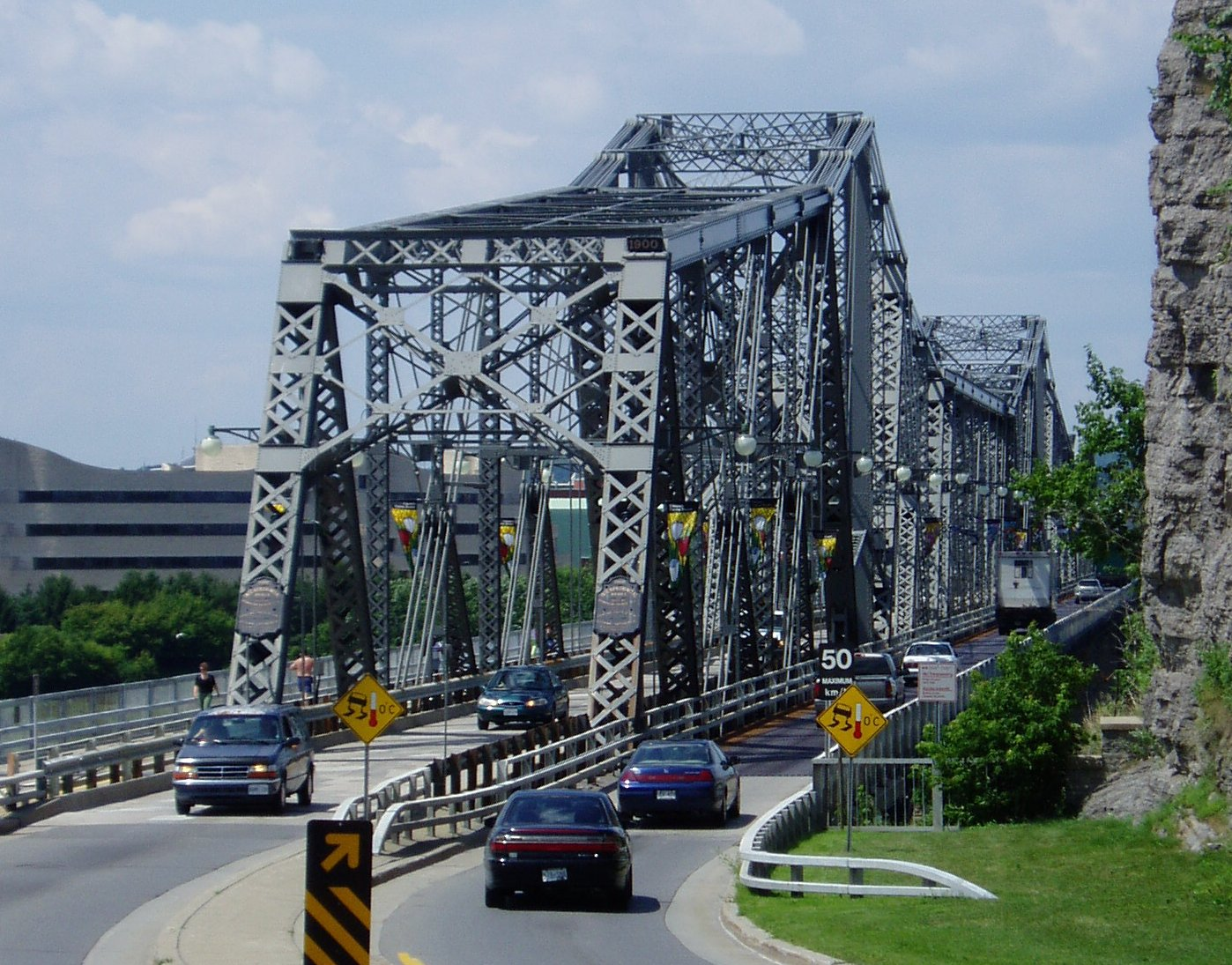
The Alexandra Bridge seen from Ottawa

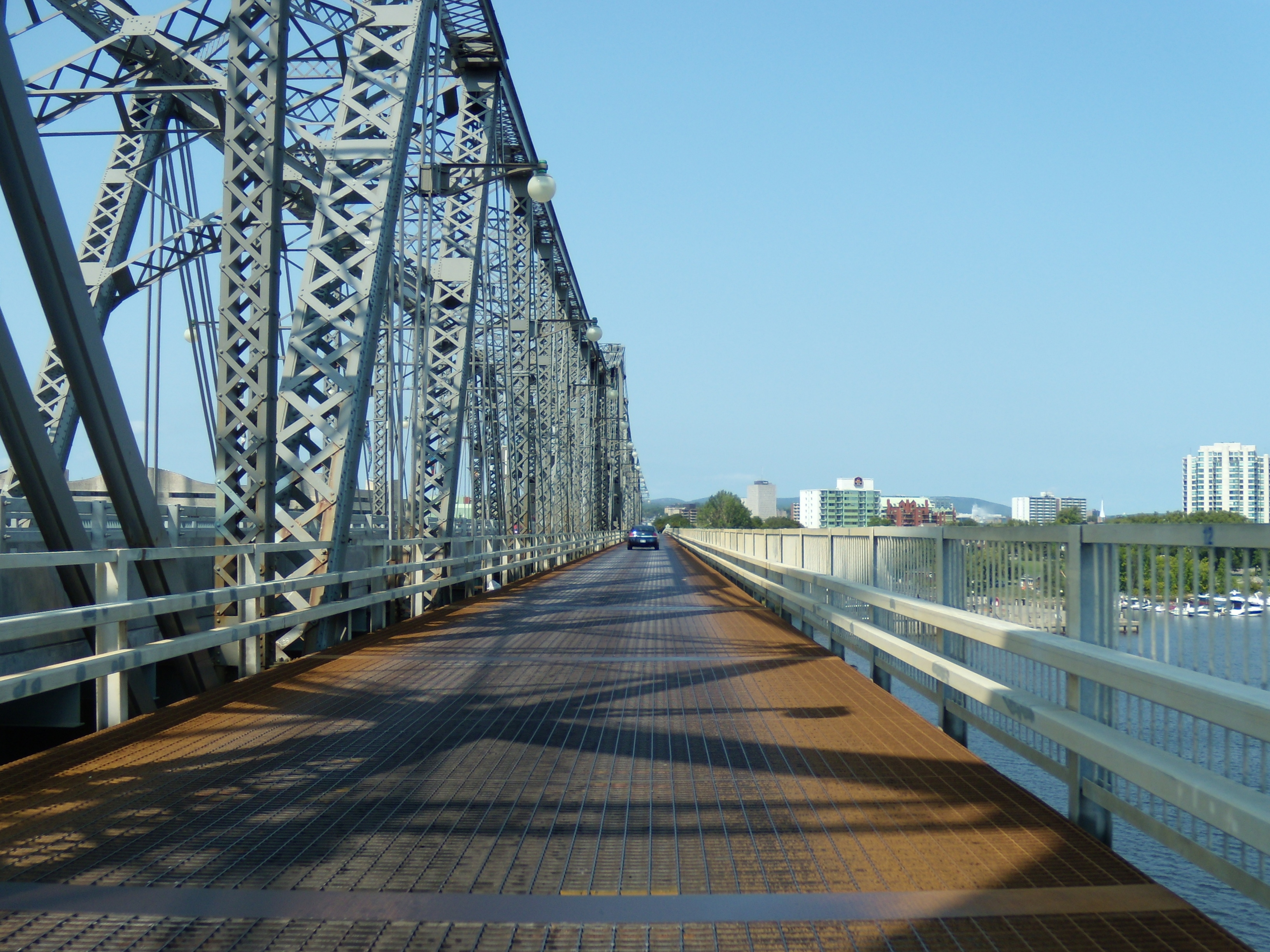
Crossing the Alexandra bridge from the Ottawa side

The Royal Alexandra Interprovincial Bridge crosses the Ottawa River just east of Parliament Hill at Nepean Point in Ottawa. The bridge was designed primarily to carry CPR trains but also had a track for local electric trolley service between Ottawa and Hull, as well as a lane for carriage traffic. A large fire severely damaged the bridge in 1946, permanently terminating trolley traffic.

During the late 1950s the bridge was upgraded to carry vehicular and pedestrian traffic. The closure of Ottawa Union Station in 1966 saw the last passenger trains use the Royal Alexandra Bridge and the railway tracks were removed as the bridge became exclusively a vehicular-pedestrian bridge.

On August 21, 1989, the bridge was the site of a noted murder. Alain Brosseau, a waiter at the Château Laurier, was walking home to his apartment in Hull after finishing his shift at 11:30 pm. On his way he passed through Major's Hill Park. The park was known as a popular gay cruising area, and six youths were also in the park searching for homosexuals to rob and attack. They saw Brosseau and followed him when he walked to the bridge, believing incorrectly that he was gay. A short way across Brosseau was first hit with a stick and then robbed. Gang member Jeffrey Lalonde then lifted Brosseau and threw him off the bridge. Brosseau was killed instantly when he hit the rocks below. Lalonde was given a life sentence, and died in jail in 2008.

The bridge is designated by the Canadian Society for Civil Engineering a National Historic Civil Engineering Site in June 1995. It was owned by the Canadian Pacific Railway until it was taken over by the National Capital Commission in 1970. It is now (2018) owned by the Government of Canada and maintained by Public Services and Procurement Canada (PSPC).

== Current use ==
The bridge provided an important commuter link between Ottawa and Gatineau. The roadways for vehicles are located on the centre and east decks. Centre deck road surface is paved while the east deck is a metal steel grating.

The west deck provides a panorama of the Ottawa-Gatineau skyline, the Ottawa River and Parliament Buildings. That deck is used by rollerbladers, cyclists, and pedestrians, and is on the official route of the Trans Canada Trail. The bike lane of the bridge links to two major cross-town bike paths. In Gatineau, there is the Voyageur Pathway that links the Aylmer and Gatineau sectors, while in Ottawa there is the Ottawa River Pathway's western section that links downtown to Carling Avenue. A third pathway, De l'Île, travels through the Old Hull section beside Boulevard des Allumettières (formerly called Boulevard Saint-Laurent), the road that continues after the bridge on the Gatineau side making a single stretch of road from Eardley Road to the former CFB Rockcliffe.

At both ends of the bridge are two major museums. In the Gatineau side of the river is the Canadian Museum of History while on the Ottawa side is the National Art Gallery while the Canadian Mint Museum and the former Canadian War Museum was located beside the Gallery. Also, on each end of the bridge are two major parks: Major's Hill Park (Ottawa) and Jacques Cartier Park (Gatineau) two major venues of the Canadian Tulip Festival and the Canada Day festivities.

The bridge used to carry roughly 15,000 vehicles, 2000 pedestrians and 1300 cyclists each day, as of 2009. A two-year rehabilitation project which began in 2009, included various structural improvements and replacements of the centre concrete deck, the wood boardwalk and guardrails.

Nepean Point overlooks the bridge from the Ottawa side. The Rideau Canal meets the Ottawa River immediately upriver of the bridge's Ottawa abutment.

In 2017, following an assessment that found important deterioration of some members of the steel structure, repairs to the structure were planned. In late 2018, a cost analysis suggested that replacing the bridge would be less disruptive and less expensive than maintaining it. In the federal budget of March of the following year, the Canadian government directed the bridge to be replaced by the year 2032.

By 2020, the Coalition for the Alexandra Bridge had formed to oppose to the hasty decision to demolish the landmark and request independent studies by conservation engineers to determine viable preservation options.

In October 2023, the bridge was closed to vehicle traffic to perform the repairs identified in 2017, while active transportation use was allowed to continue. The closure to vehicle traffic was expected to end in fall of 2024 but was extended to February 2025. The bridge reopened to vehicle traffic on February 25, 2025.

The bridge replacement project is still in the planning phase. Several designs have been submitted while environmental and cultural impact assessments are on-going. Demolition of the historic bridge and construction of a replacement is planned to begin in 2028. A final design was selected in January 2025 amongst three option presented to the public, although this option was the least preferred in public consultations.

== Specifications ==
- Type: truss bridge with five spans
- Length: 563.27 m (1,848 ft)
- Width: 18.89 m (62 ft)
- Height of tower posts: 28.95 m (95 ft)
- Length of main cantilever span: 172.21 m (556 ft)

== See also ==
- List of bridges in Ottawa
- List of bridges in Canada
- List of crossings of the Ottawa River
- Royal eponyms in Canada
