= Saint-Hermas =

Coordinates: 45.6044°N 74.1925°W

Saint-Hermas is a former municipality within the province of Quebec, Canada. Geographical coordinates are 45°39' North and 74°05' West.

In 1971 it amalgamated into the city of Mirabel, Quebec.
