= Allumettières Boulevard =

Road in Gatineau, Quebec, Canada

Boulevard des Allumettières
- formerly Boulevard Saint-Laurent
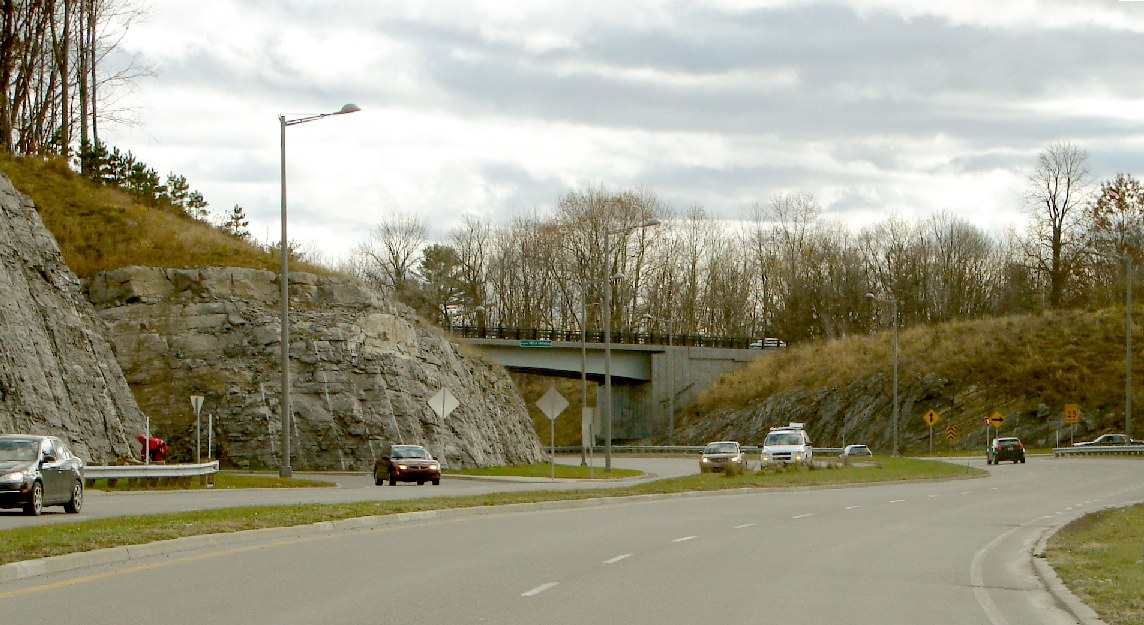

Location
- Country: Canada
- Province: Quebec

Highway system
- Quebec provincial highways; Autoroutes; List; Former

Boulevard des Allumettières (formerly called Boulevard Saint-Laurent) is a major 13.7 km arterial road and expressway in Gatineau, Quebec, Canada, that connects Aylmer and Hull sectors of the city running from Chemin Eardley Road to the Alexandra Bridge towards Ottawa. It is the most recent east-west arterial connection from the West to the downtown core and construction of the entire length was completed during the fall of 2007.

== Early years ==
This road was built in the late 1990s to serve as a by-pass of the Aylmer sector as well as a quicker route for Route 148 which is the number assigned for this route. While it contains at-grade intersections, it may be upgraded to Autoroute 50. The western end of the road is at the intersection of the former section of Highway/Route 148 (Chemin Eardley).

Initially, in the 1970s, it was part of a larger route planned to connect Aylmer to downtown Hull roughly along the same corridor and through the current Saint-Laurent Boulevard. Several blocks of late-19th century to mid-20th century homes were expropriated to make for the project, but numerous issues delayed the project for several years although portions of the planned road were built including the initial portion of Saint-Laurent between near Saint-Redempteur Boulevard and the Alexandra Bridge. Residents in the Wrightville and Île de Hull areas had criticized the move in the 1970s as the project and expropriations were made without public consultations

== Extension project ==
This road has been extended east of (Boulevard Saint-Raymond) to connect with the extended portion of Boulevard Saint-Laurent east of Lac des Fées parkway. The eastern segment which was named Saint-Laurent was renamed des Allumettières as the continuation of the same stretch of road. Residents in the Aylmer sector as well as those in the growing Plateau de la Capitale and Manoir des Trembles neighborhoods of the Hull sector and those from Pontiac can use this route as a more direct route to the downtown sections of Hull and Ottawa. The new boulevard opened on 3 December 2007 after decades of debate on whether this project would be completed, while bulldozing in the area near Boulevard Saint-Joseph was done many years ago. It passes through Gatineau Park despite concerns from environmentalists, but measures were taken to reduce the impact on the environment including the construction of a temporary bridge. The cost of the bridge totaled just under $100 million and was considered the most costly roadway project per square kilometre in the history of the province of Quebec.

Interchanges were built for access to the Gatineau Parkway and Lac des Fees Parkway as well as for Boulevard Saint-Raymond, while roundabouts were built at Labelle and Demontigny Streets and Saint-Joseph Boulevard in 2004-2005 as well as a second exit from westbound A-50. There are intersections (with lights) connecting Allumettières with Boulevard des Grives (Northbound only, effective November 2011), Chemin Vanier, Rue Samuel-Edey, Boulevard Wilfred-Lavigne, Avenue des Champignons (lights for pedestrian crossing, ramps only from WB Allumettières to/from Champignons North), Chemin Klock/Rue Broad, Rue Front, and ends at Chemin Eardley.

When opened, it was expected to ease congestion on both Boulevard Saint-Raymond and Boulevard Alexandre-Taché, but it is unclear if STO transit buses will use this future four-lane road for faster transit trips towards downtown and the future Rapibus rapid transit roadway that will be completed by 2010. Transports Quebec did not add designated lanes in the newly built segment, arguing that not enough buses would travel there during the rush hour but the STO may file a request. Gatineau Councillor Alain Riel, in which the road crosses the center of his ward, had requested in December 2007 that the Rapibus should be extended to Aylmer using the grassy-median of the boulevard until at least Saint-Raymond citing concerns that residents of his ward may abandon public transit for their cars due to the extension of the new roadway.

== Revitalization of the downtown segment ==
In the downtown area, the artery was revitalized near Boulevard Maisonneuve, giving the route a much more modern look near the city's busiest intersection. Some new housing units were also built to replace older ones.

== Road name ==
It was formerly known by journalists and local residents and the ministry of Transport as the Axe McConnell-Laramée after the two roads that are located alongside each end. Then it became Boulevard de l'Outaouais. During the construction of the new segment the city of Gatineau planned to change the name to one related to the history of the Outaouais. Philemon-Wright and Jos-Montferrand were among the possibilities, as well as Asticou, Aimé-Guertin and des Allumettières. The name of Bobino in reference to the late local comedian Guy Sanche was also suggested by many residents. A petition was circulated in order to influence the City to consider Bobino, but was not considered by the Urban Planning Committee.

On 27 February 2007, the Urban Planning Committee and City Council chose the name des Allumettières, in reference to local female workers in the matchstick industry during the region's early years, for the full length between Eardley Road and the Alexandra Bridge which will also replace the name "Boulevard Saint-Laurent" in the easternmost segment. The new name change was implemented in the western segment from Boulevard Saint-Raymond during the summer. Homes and businesses located along St-Laurent will have des Allumettières addresses now that the full length has opened (3 December 2007).

The "Allumettières" were women who worked at the famous E. B. Eddy mill, making matches (allumettières is the feminine plural of the French word allumettier, meaning "matchmaker"). They became famous in 1919 and 1924 when they went on strike and stood up to the management.

== Features ==
Among the main attractions along des Allumettières are the Canadian Museum of History and Jacques Cartier Park located at the entrance to the Alexandra Bridge. Further west is the Robert Guertin Arena (Carillon Street) which is home to the QMJHL team, the Gatineau Olympiques.

== Neighbourhoods ==
- Île de Hull/Downtown
- Wrightville
- Le Plateau
- Pilon/Jardins Lavigne
- McLeod/Terrasses Eardley

== See also ==
- List of Gatineau roads
