= Quebec Autoroute 50 =

Highway in Quebec

Autoroute 50
- Autoroute Guy-Lafleur

Route information
- Maintained by Transports Québec
- Length: 158.3 km (98.4 mi)
- Existed: 1975–present

Major junctions
- West end: Rue Montcalm in Gatineau
- R-148 in Gatineau; A-5 in Gatineau; A-15 (TCH) in Mirabel
- East end: R-117 in Mirabel

Location
- Country: Canada
- Province: Quebec
- Major cities: Gatineau, Mirabel, Lachute, Brownsburg-Chatham, L'Ange-Gardien

Highway system
- Quebec provincial highways; Autoroutes; List; Former
← A-40	→ A-55

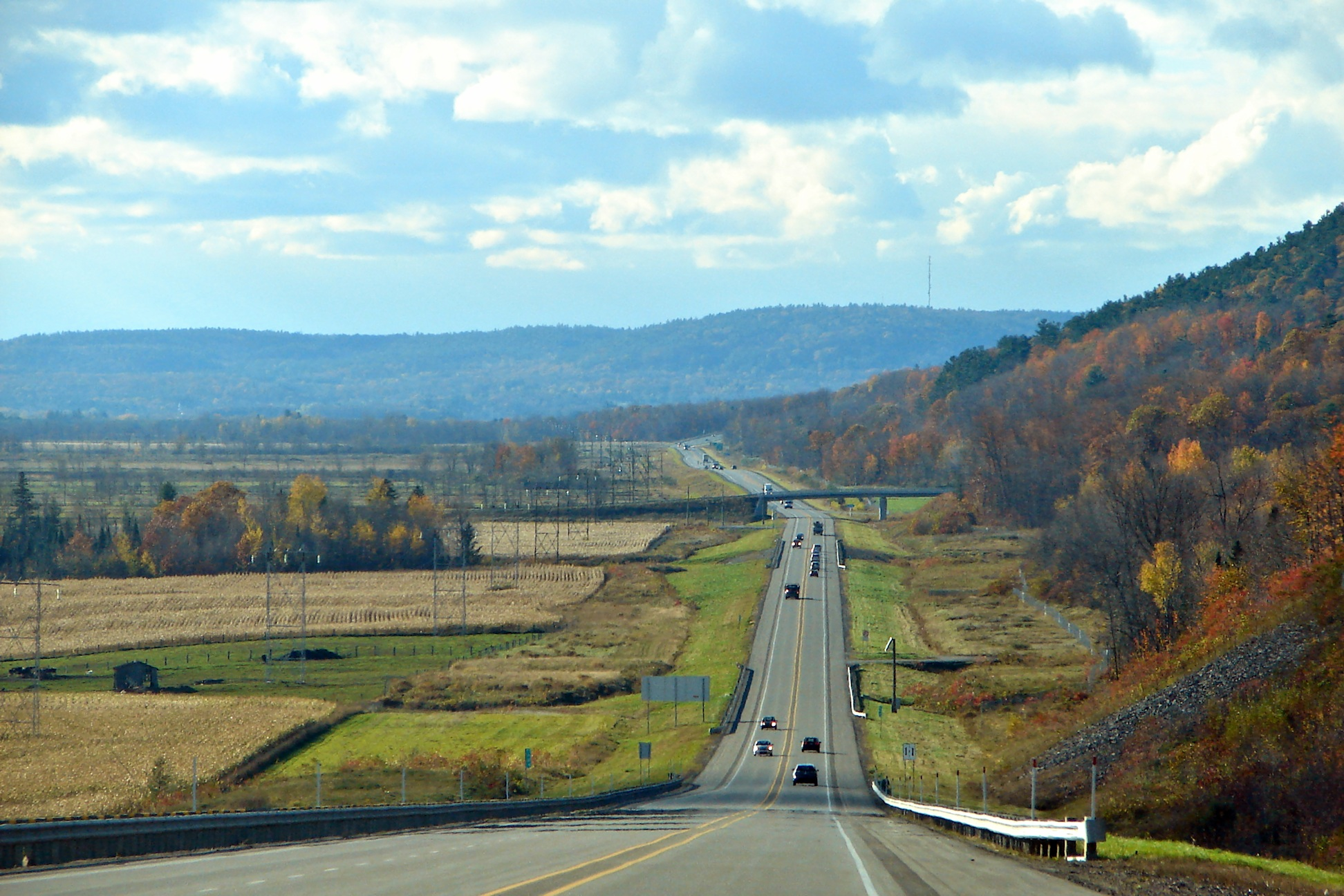
Autoroute 50 between Fassett and Calumet in the Ottawa River Valley

Autoroute 50 (Autoroute Guy-Lafleur) is an Autoroute in western Quebec, Canada. It links Canada's National Capital Region (Gatineau) and the Greater Montreal area (Mirabel).

Until November 2012, there were two distinct sections of A-50: one section running eastward from Hull and the other westward from Mirabel. The gap in the highway was filled on November 26, 2012, and the two-lane freeway opened for traffic on the full 159 km (98.8 mi) length.

The route provides an east-west freeway alternative to Route 148 that does not require travelling in Ontario, unlike the main Trans-Canada Highway route (A-40 / Hwy 417).

Originally named Autoroute de l'Outaouais, it was announced on April 28, 2023, that A-50 would be renamed to Autoroute Guy-Lafleur in honor of the former Montreal Canadiens player who died of lung cancer a year earlier. The Quebec government officially announced the name change on May 4 in Thurso, Lafleur's birthplace.

== History ==
Oswald Parent (a Liberal MP from Hull) originally proposed construction of the A-50 in 1962. Eight years later, Quebec Premier Jean-Jacques Bertrand announced plans for construction. It was originally envisioned that the A-50 would extend over 400 km from L'Isle-aux-Allumettes at the Ontario border through Saint-Jérôme and Joliette along the Route 148 and 158 corridors to Berthierville and a junction with the A-40. The primary purpose of the A-50 was to connect Ottawa and the Outaouais with Montréal–Mirabel International Airport.

At the time, the Ottawa Macdonald–Cartier International Airport was not yet built, and the national capital lacked highway access to an international air hub. Mirabel's rapid decline as an air hub as well as the Quebec government's decision in the 1970s to impose a moratorium on new autoroute construction resulted in a significantly truncated route for the A-50. Plans for extending the A-50 west of Hull and east of the A-15/TCH were abandoned. The exit numbers, however, are based on that original projected length of the autoroute.

Construction was completed in the fall of 2007 on the road that connects Highway 148 west of the Aylmer and Hull sectors to the A-50 at the Boulevard des Allumettières interchange.

One short section of Route 158 around Joliette was originally signed as A-50 as well until the project was abandoned. In addition, west of the current terminus, a four-lane at-grade expressway continues as Route 148 into the Aylmer section of Gatineau; it may become part of A-50 in the future.

A-50 is a four- to six-lane freeway through Gatineau up to Buckingham, the remainder is mostly a two-lane freeway. Many overpasses are built to accommodate a fully divided, four-lane highway in the future such that only one portion of the overpass is currently used. However, there have been demands for a four-lane highway for the new segment so it can be safer. The first two segments were built with only two lanes, and a 2007 multi-fatality accident occurred on highway 148 near Buckingham, a section of highway that A-50 would bypass.

Unusual for a limited-access highway, the A-50 contains two railway crossings at grade, both of the Quebec Gatineau Railway (QGRY). The first crosses the QGRY Lachute Subdivision between exits 260 and 272, at 45.651008°N 74.229047°W, while the second crosses the QGRY St-Jerome Spur about 1 km west of exit 279, at 45.682948°N 74.125982°W.

There was some support to rename the highway Autoroute Maurice-Richard after historic Montreal Canadiens hockey player Maurice Richard, but the Commission de toponymie du Québec chose to wait until the section between Buckingham and Notre-Dame-de-Bonsecours was finished before making a decision.

In 2022, following the death of Montreal Canadiens hockey legend Guy Lafleur (who was a native of Thurso), the Quebec government openly considered renaming the highway after Lafleur following a request made by the Minister Responsible for the Outaouais Region Mathieu Lacombe and by Thurso mayor Benoit Lauzon. In late April 2023, Quebec newspaper Le Droit reported that the highway would officially be renamed Autoroute Guy-Lafleur in a ceremony happening in Thurso on Thursday, May 4, 2023, in which both Lacombe and Quebec premier François Legault would be in attendance for.

== Safety improvements ==
Following a series of fatal collisions in 2007, it was announced that centreline rumble strips would be installed in various no-passing zones along Autoroute 50. This is the first installation of its kind in Quebec and serves as a pilot project.

The two at-grade intersections at km 281 and 283 were removed in 2016.

== Exit list ==
RCM	Location	km	mi	Exit	Destinations	Notes
Gatineau		0.0	0.0	133	Rue Montcalm	At-grade intersection; western terminus
Gatineau		0.3	0.19	134	R-148 west (Boulevard des Allumettières)	Westbound exit and eastbound entrance; signed as exits 134-O (west) and 134-E (east); west end of R-148 concurrency
Gatineau		1.3– 2.3	0.81– 1.4	135	A-5 (Autoroute de la Gatineau) – Gatineau Centre-Ville, Ottawa, Maniwaki	A-5 exit 2
Gatineau		3.5	2.2	138	R-307 (Rue Saint-Louis) – Cantley	
Gatineau		4.7	2.9	139	R-148 east (Boulevard Maloney)	Eastbound exit and westbound entrance; east end of R-148 concurrency
Gatineau		4.8	3.0	140	Boulevard de La Gappe	Westbound access to R-148 east
Gatineau		6.8	4.2	141	Boulevard de La Vérendrye	Eastbound exit and westbound entrance
Gatineau		11.1	6.9	145	Montée Paiement	
Gatineau		13.7	8.5	147	Boulevard Labrosse	
Gatineau		16.4	10.2	150	R-366 (Boulevard Lorrain)	
Gatineau		20.1	12.5	154	Boulevard de l'Aéroport – Gatineau-Ottawa Executive Airport	
Gatineau		25.7	16.0	159	Avenue des Laurentides	
Gatineau		31.1	19.3	165	Rue Georges	Eastbound exit and westbound entrance
Gatineau		31.9	19.8	166	R-315 (Chemin de Masson / Avenue de Buckingham) to R-148	
Gatineau		36.4	22.6	171	Chemin Lépine	
Les Collines-de-l'Outaouais	L'Ange-Gardien	39.8	24.7	174	R-309 north / Chemin Doherty – Mont-Laurier	Transition from 4 to 2 lanes or vice versa
Papineau	Thurso	52.5	32.6	187	R-317 – Thurso, Ripon	
Papineau	Plaisance	62.8	39.0	197	Montée Papineau	
Papineau	Papineauville	70.3	43.7	205	R-321 – Papineauville, Saint-André-Avellin	Transition from 2 to 4 lanes or vice versa
Papineau	Notre-Dame-de-Bonsecours	76.2	47.3	210	R-323 – Montebello, Mont-Tremblant	Transition from 4 to 2 lanes or vice versa
Papineau	Fassett	82.7	51.4	216	Fassett	
Argenteuil	Grenville-sur-la-Rouge	92.3	57.4	226	Chemin Avoca – Grenville-sur-la-Rouge, Harrington	
Argenteuil	Grenville-sur-la-Rouge	99.6	61.9	233	Chemin Kilmar	
Argenteuil	Grenville-sur-la-Rouge	105.7	65.7	239	R-344 south to R-148 / Chemin Scotch – Grenville, Hawkesbury	To Ontario Highway 34
Argenteuil	Brownsburg-Chatham	118.2	73.4	252	Montée Labranche	
Argenteuil	Brownsburg-Chatham	120.3	74.8	254	R-148 (Rue Principale) – Lachute	Transition from 2 to 4 lanes or vice versa
Argenteuil	Lachute	124.2	77.2	258	R-327 (Avenue d'Argenteuil) – Saint-André-d'Argenteuil	To Carillon–Pointe-Fortune ferry
Argenteuil	Lachute	126.3	78.5	260	R-329 (Chemin Béthanie) – Lachute Centre-Ville, Mirabel (Saint-Hermas)	Transition from 4 to 2 lanes or vice versa
Mirabel		138.6	86.1	272	R-148 (Route Arthur-Sauvé) to R-158 – Saint-Eustache	
Mirabel		145.2	90.2	279	Saint-Colomban, Mirabel (Saint-Canut, Sainte-Scholastique)	
Mirabel		150.2	93.3	285	Boulevard Henri-Fabre O. – Mirabel International Airport	Signed as exits 285-N (north) and 285-S (south) westbound; transition from 2 to 4 lanes or vice versa
Mirabel		152.8	94.9	288	Boulevard Henri-Fabre	
Mirabel		156.2– 157.9	97.1– 98.1	292	A-15 (TCH) (Autoroute des Laurentides) – Saint-Jérôme, Montréal	Signed as exits 292-N (north) and 292-S (south); exit 35 on A-15
Mirabel		158.3	98.4	293	R-117 (Boulevard Curé-Labelle) – Saint-Jérôme, Mirabel (Saint-Janvier)	At-grade intersection; eastern terminus
1.000 mi = 1.609 km; 1.000 km = 0.621 mi: Concurrency terminus; Incomplete access
