= Centre de services scolaire des Draveurs =

Location
- 200 Boulevard Maloney Gatineau, Quebec Gatineau Gatineau sector), Cantley & Val-des-Monts, Quebec Canada

District information
- Chair of the board: Julien Croteau (president)
- Director of education: Marcel Bellemare
- Schools: 24 elementary schools; 4 high schools
- Budget: CA$150.2 million in revenues & $150 million in spending million (2006-2007)

Students and staff
- Students: 20,000

Other information
- Elected trustees: Riding 1: Julien Croteau; Riding 2: Andrée Sirois; Riding 3: Pierre Montreuil; Riding 4: Paul Loyer; Riding 5: Normand Sylvestre; Riding 6: Rachelle Laporte; Riding 7: Josée Lavigne; Riding 8: Francine Diotte; Riding 9: Claude J.R. Monfils; Riding 10: Paul Morin; Riding 11: Pierre Lefebvre; Riding 12: Bernard W. Morissette; Riding 13: Richard Quinn; Riding 14: Donald Verrette; Riding 15: Michel Choquette; Riding 16: Michel Parenteau; Riding 17: Gilbert Jolin; Riding 18: Benoît Tessier; Riding 19: Marie-France Gagnon; Riding 20: Robert Paquet; Riding 21: Diane Charbonneau
- Website: www.cssd.gouv.qc.ca

The Centre de services scolaire des Draveurs is one of 4 public Francophone school service centres operating in the Outaouais region, Quebec. The school board was created in 1986 in the old city of Gatineau about 15 years before amalgamation. The board is responsible for primary, secondary and adult schools located in the former city of Gatineau as well as in the municipalities of Val-des-Monts and Cantley located north of Gatineau. Its current president is Christine Emond-Lapointe, a former Bloc Québécois candidate for the riding of Pontiac in the 2006 Canadian federal elections. The general manager is Francois Jette.

The board operates 24 primary schools across the Gatineau sector as well as in Cantley and Val-des-Monts. However, it recent years, they have closed certain primary schools due to lower yearly attendance at those schools.

The board also operates 4 high schools : Polyvalente de l'Érablière, Polyvalente Nicolas-Gatineau, Polyvalente Le Carrefour and École secondaire du Versant and offers transportation to students attending Collège Saint-Joseph de Hull and Collège Saint-Alexandre, the city's two private schools.

It also operates professional and adult formation centres including the Centre de Competence Outaouais and the L'Escale and Nouvelle-Horizon center for adults.

Several councillors of the City of Gatineau were formally or are school trustees at the CSD. Among those included Aurèle Desjardins, Joseph de Sylva, Paul Morin and Luc Angers.

Its motto is: Le meilleur de toi-même!(The best version of yourself)

== Primary schools ==
- École Carle
- École de l'Envolée
- École de l'Escalade
- École de l'Odyssée (Jean XXIII & St-René Goupil)
- École de la Colline (Val-des-Monts)
- École de la Montée
- École de la Rose-des-Vents (Cantley)
- École de la Traversée (Lavigne & Ste-Maria Goretti)
- École de Touraine (George-Étienne Cartier & Riviera)
- École des Belles-Rives (Sainte-Rose)
- École des Cépages
- École des Trois-Saisons
- École du Bois-Joli
- École du Nouveau-Monde (Renaud & Saint-Rosaire)
- École du Vallon
- École L'Équipage (Val-des-Monts)
- École L'Oiseau Bleu
- École La Sablonnière
- École La Source
- École Le Petit Prince
- École Le Tremplin (Le Coteau)
- École Massé
- École Raymond
- École Sainte-Élizabeth
