= Phillippe Aumont =

Canadian baseball player (born 1989)

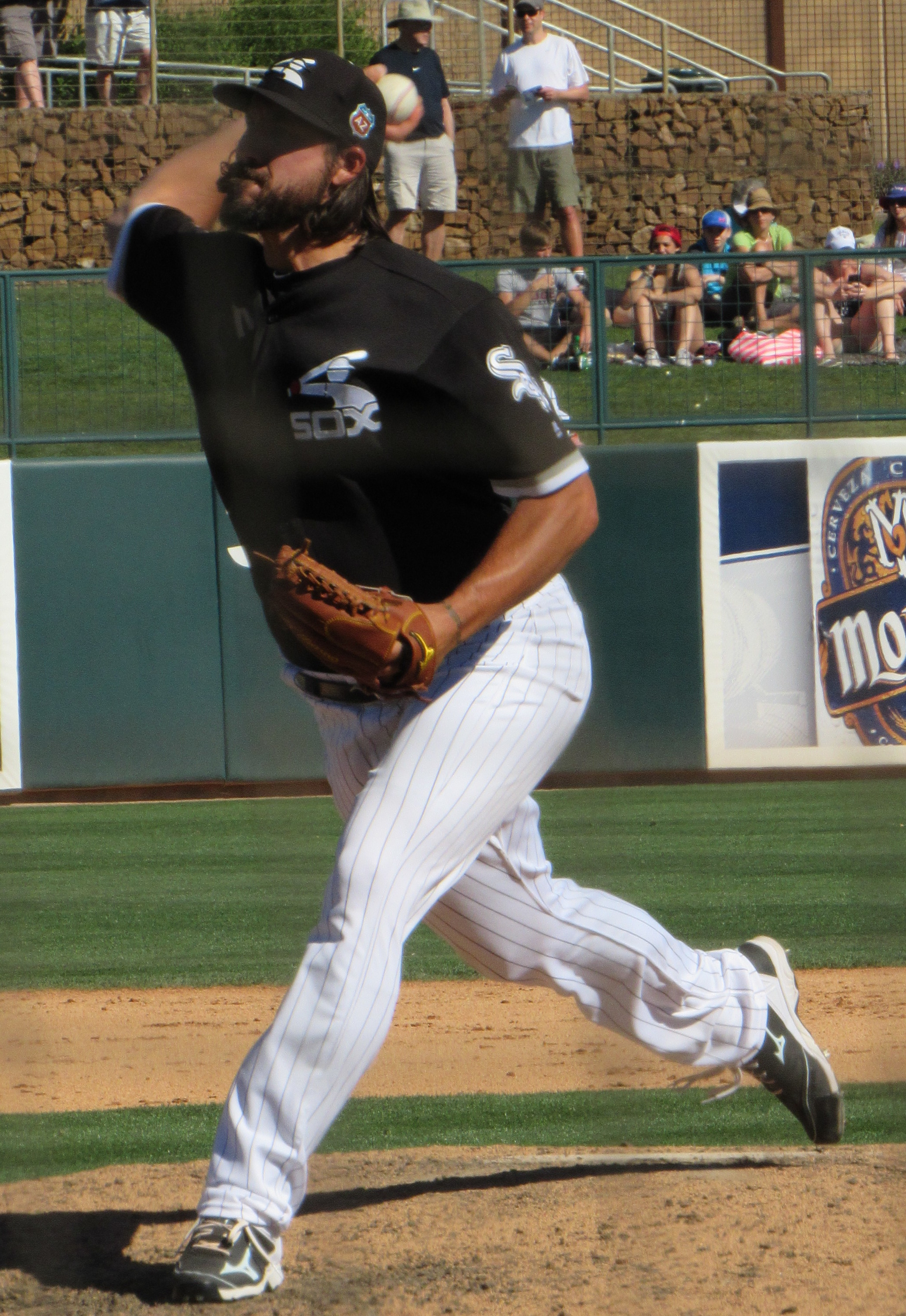
- Aumont with the Chicago White Sox during spring training in 2016
- Pitcher
- Born: January 7, 1989 (age 37); Gatineau, Quebec, Canada
- Batted: Left Threw: Right

MLB debut
- August 23, 2012, for the Philadelphia Phillies

Last MLB appearance
- June 19, 2015, for the Philadelphia Phillies

MLB statistics
- Win–loss record: 1–6
- Earned run average: 6.80
- Strikeouts: 42
- Stats at Baseball Reference

Teams
- Philadelphia Phillies (2012–2015)
Medals
Men's baseball
Representing Canada
Pan American Games
Gold medal – first place	2015 Toronto	Team
Silver medal – second place	2019 Lima	Team
World Junior Baseball Championship
Bronze medal – third place	2006 Sancti Spíritus	Team

Phillippe Aumont (born January 7, 1989) is a Canadian former professional baseball pitcher, who played for the Philadelphia Phillies of Major League Baseball (MLB). He was drafted by the Seattle Mariners 11th overall in the 2007 Major League Baseball draft, and was the third earliest Canadian pick (after Adam Loewen and Jeff Francis, both picked in 2002) as well as the first player born in Quebec to be selected in the first round of the draft.

== Early life ==
Aumont was raised in a low-income housing complex in Quebec, the third of four siblings. His mother worked in a hotel and his father for a moving company. As a child Aumont's first love was baseball. He played with different regional and provincial teams, while attending high school at École secondaire du Versant in Gatineau, Quebec. Aumont was 15 years old when the Montreal Expos left for Washington, D.C. after the 2004 season, but still supported the team despite playing in a new location.

== Professional career ==
=== Seattle Mariners ===
Aumont was drafted by the Seattle Mariners with the 11th overall pick of the 2007 Major League Baseball draft and signed a contract which included a $1.9 million signing bonus. Aumont appeared in 15 games in 2008 (8 starts) for the Seattle Mariners A level affiliate, the Wisconsin Timber Rattlers, posting a 2.75 ERA over 55 2/3 innings with 50 strikeouts versus 19 walks. He began the 2009 baseball season with the High Desert Mavericks, the Seattle Mariners Advanced A affiliate, where he was converted into a reliever. In 29 appearances he posted a 3.24 ERA with 12 saves as the closer, earning a promotion to the Double-A West Tenn Diamond Jaxx in mid-July. He finished the 2009 season with a 2–6 record, 16 saves, 3.88 ERA, and 59 strikeouts in 51 innings pitched. In the offseason, Aumont played in the Arizona Fall League for the Peoria Javelinas, and posted a dismal 12.00 ERA in 10 appearances.

=== Philadelphia Phillies ===
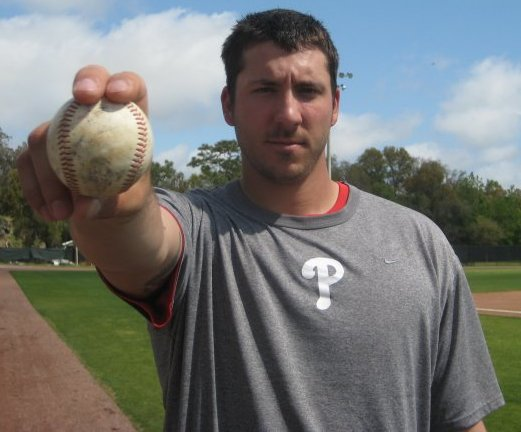
Aumont with the Phillies in 2010

On December 16, 2009, Aumont was traded to the Philadelphia Phillies along with Tyson Gillies and J. C. Ramírez for Cliff Lee.

Aumont played the 2010 season with the Advanced-A Clearwater Threshers and Double-A Reading Phillies, posting a combined record of 3–11, a 5.68 ERA, and 115 strikeouts in a career-high 122 innings pitched, mostly as a starter. He was moved back to a relief role for the 2011 season and made 43 total appearances for Double-A Reading, as well as the Triple-A Lehigh Valley IronPigs.

Aumont began the 2012 season in the bullpen for Triple-A Lehigh Valley, posting a 3–1 record, 4.26 ERA, and 59 strikeouts in 44 1/3 innings pitched. On August 20, he was promoted to the majors for the first time. He made his MLB debut on August 23, pitching a scoreless inning against the Cincinnati Reds. Aumont finished the season in the Phillies bullpen, appearing in 18 games and posting a 3.68 ERA with 2 saves.

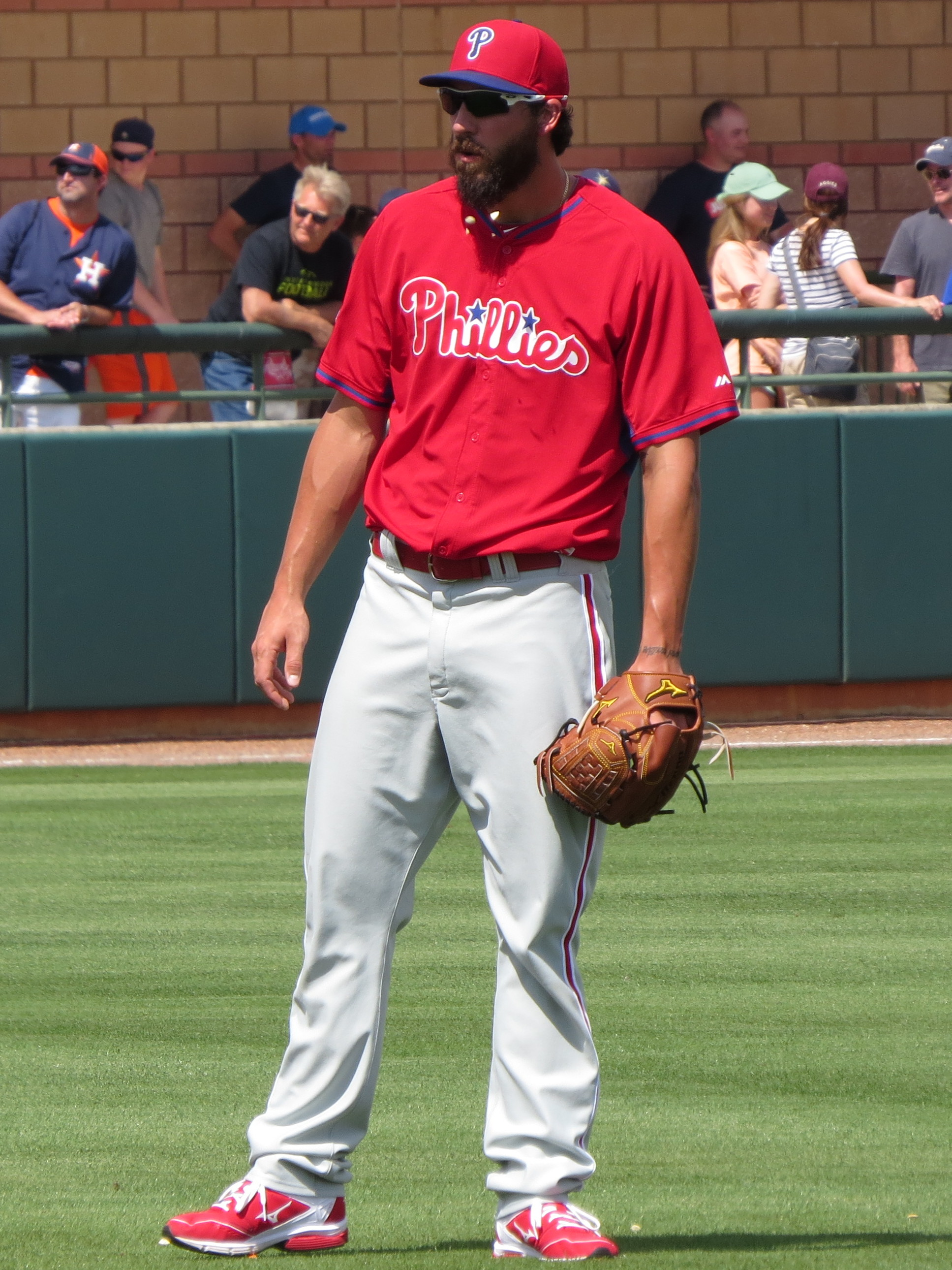
Aumont with the Phillies in 2013

After opening the 2013 season in the Phillies bullpen, Aumont was demoted to Triple-A on May 23. He made 22 total appearances at the major league level in 2013 as well as 32 appearances in the minors, and struggled with command, walking 51 batters in 55 combined innings.

On June 1, 2014, Aumont was recalled by the Phillies; he pitched in his first game back on the roster and took the loss. Aumont appeared in just 5 games for the Phillies, posting an ERA of 19.06.

On April 1, 2015, Aumont was sent outright to Triple-A. During the 2015 season with Lehigh Valley, Aumont transitioned back to a starter for the first time since 2010. After posting solid numbers in Triple-A, Aumont was called up on June 19, but struggled mightily with his control, walking 7 batters and serving up 2 home runs in just 4 innings. It was his lone start as the Phillies designated him for assignment afterwards. On June 24, Aumont declined his outright assignment and instead became a free agent.

=== Toronto Blue Jays ===
On July 28, 2015, Aumont signed a minor league contract with the Toronto Blue Jays. On August 21, Aumont was released.

=== Chicago White Sox ===
On November 23, 2015, Aumont signed a minor league contract with the Chicago White Sox. Aumont pitched to a 12.27 ERA over 11 innings with the Triple-A Charlotte Knights, and announced his retirement on June 6, 2016.

=== Ottawa Champions ===
On June 7, 2017, Aumont came out of retirement and signed a one-year deal with the Ottawa Champions of the Canadian American Association of Professional Baseball. He would make his debut in the second game of a doubleheader against the Rockland Boulders. On June 28, 2017. Aumont threw the first no-hitter in Ottawa Champions history against the Dominican Republic national baseball team. During the 2017 season, he had a 5.14 ERA and 103 strikeouts in 115 2/3 innings.

=== Detroit Tigers ===
On January 9, 2018, Aumont signed a minor league contract with the Detroit Tigers. He spent the year with the Triple–A Toledo Mud Hens, also appearing in two games for the Double–A Erie SeaWolves. In 29 games for Toledo, Aumont struggled to a 6.58 ERA with 62 strikeouts across 53 1/3 innings pitched. He elected free agency following the season on November 2.

=== Ottawa Champions (second stint) ===
On January 10, 2019, Aumont signed with the Ottawa Champions of the Can-Am League. On July 16, Aumont threw 18 strikeouts in a complete-game victory over the Rockland Boulders, setting a Can-Am League record for strikeouts in a single game. He finished the season with the lowest ERA (2.65) and fewest earned runs against (35) among all Can-Am League starters, and was named the 2019 Pitcher of the Year. Aumont became a free agent after the Champions franchise elected to take a season off following the Can-Am League's merger with the Frontier League.

On October 25, 2019, Aumont was drafted by the Québec Capitales in the Ottawa Champions dispersal draft.

=== Toronto Blue Jays (second stint) ===
On December 2, 2019, Aumont signed a minor league contract with the Toronto Blue Jays. He did not play in a game in 2020 due to the cancellation of the minor league season because of the COVID-19 pandemic. On June 30, 2020, Aumont announced his retirement on CBC Radio.

== International play ==
Aumont pitched for the Canada national baseball team at the 2009 World Baseball Classic, 2013 World Baseball Classic, 2015 Pan American Games, 2015 WBSC Premier12, 2019 Pan American Games Qualifier, 2019 Pan American Games, 2019 WBSC Premier12, 2023 World Baseball Classic, and 2026 World Baseball Classic.

In the 2009 World Baseball Classic, Aumont appeared in the 7th inning against Team USA on March 7. He struggled early, giving up two hits and a walk, before settling down. He then proceeded to retire MLB All-Stars David Wright, Kevin Youkilis, and Curtis Granderson in order, the last two by strikeout, to escape the inning with no runs surrendered.

Prior to March 2023, Aumont had not pitched in a game since spring training in 2020. Nonetheless, at 34 years old, in his first tune-up game before the 2023 World Baseball Classic, he pitched a perfect inning against the Seattle Mariners and his fastball reached 92 miles per hour. In spite of his success, he said he was not particularly interested in pursuing professional baseball again.

On March 13, 2026, Aumont appeared in Canada's quarter-final game against the United States in the 2026 World Baseball Classic, his fourth WBC.

== Pitching style ==
Aumont was a "power" pitcher, with a hard fastball and sharp breaking ball. Standing 6 feet 7 inches (201 cm) and weighing 255 pounds (116 kg), Aumont threw a fastball in the mid 90s, reaching the upper 90s on occasion, with late movement. His breaking pitch was a "power slurve" which moves more like a curveball and had been clocked in the high 70s to low 80s. He also threw a changeup on occasion. During the 2014 offseason, Aumont commented that he has "always idolized" Randy Johnson, who is 6 feet 10 inches (208 cm) tall:

"This offseason I was looking around a little bit. What I've heard and what you can see [from the stats] is that he didn't really get through his wild stage until he was [almost 30]. So that's why when I go to bed at night I'm like, 'You know what? I still might be struggling with mechanics. I still might not be able to consistently get the corner I want or get the result of the pitch that I want. But if I keep working it will come to me and eventually I'll get it. Some guys get it really early. Some guys get it later. That's just how it works."

— Aumont, February 21, 2014

== Personal life ==
In mid-2019, Aumont's fiancée gave birth to his first child, a daughter named Gabrielle. In 2020, he began renting a farm and growing produce in Gatineau, Quebec. Aumont had another daughter named Raphaelle in or around 2022.

In January 2023, just two months before the 2023 World Baseball Classic, Aumont broke his tailbone during a recreational ice hockey game at Carleton University. He was not able to throw a baseball for about three weeks after the injury.
