= 2007 Major League Baseball draft =

Major League Baseball draft

General information
- Date: June 7–8, 2007

Overview
- 1453 total selections
- First selection: David Price; Tampa Bay Devil Rays
- First round selections: 64

The 2007 Major League Baseball draft, was an annual choosing of high school and college baseball players, held on June 7, 2007 and June 8, 2007. The first day session of the draft included the first 25 rounds and was scheduled to be broadcast "live" from Orlando, Florida on television for the first time, on ESPN2 from 2:00pm to 6:00pm Eastern Daylight Time (1800–2200 UTC). Previously the conference call format draft was broadcast live, along with commentary, on both draft days exclusively from the MLB.com website as streaming audio. In total, the draft featured 50 rounds and 1453 selections.

== First round selections ==
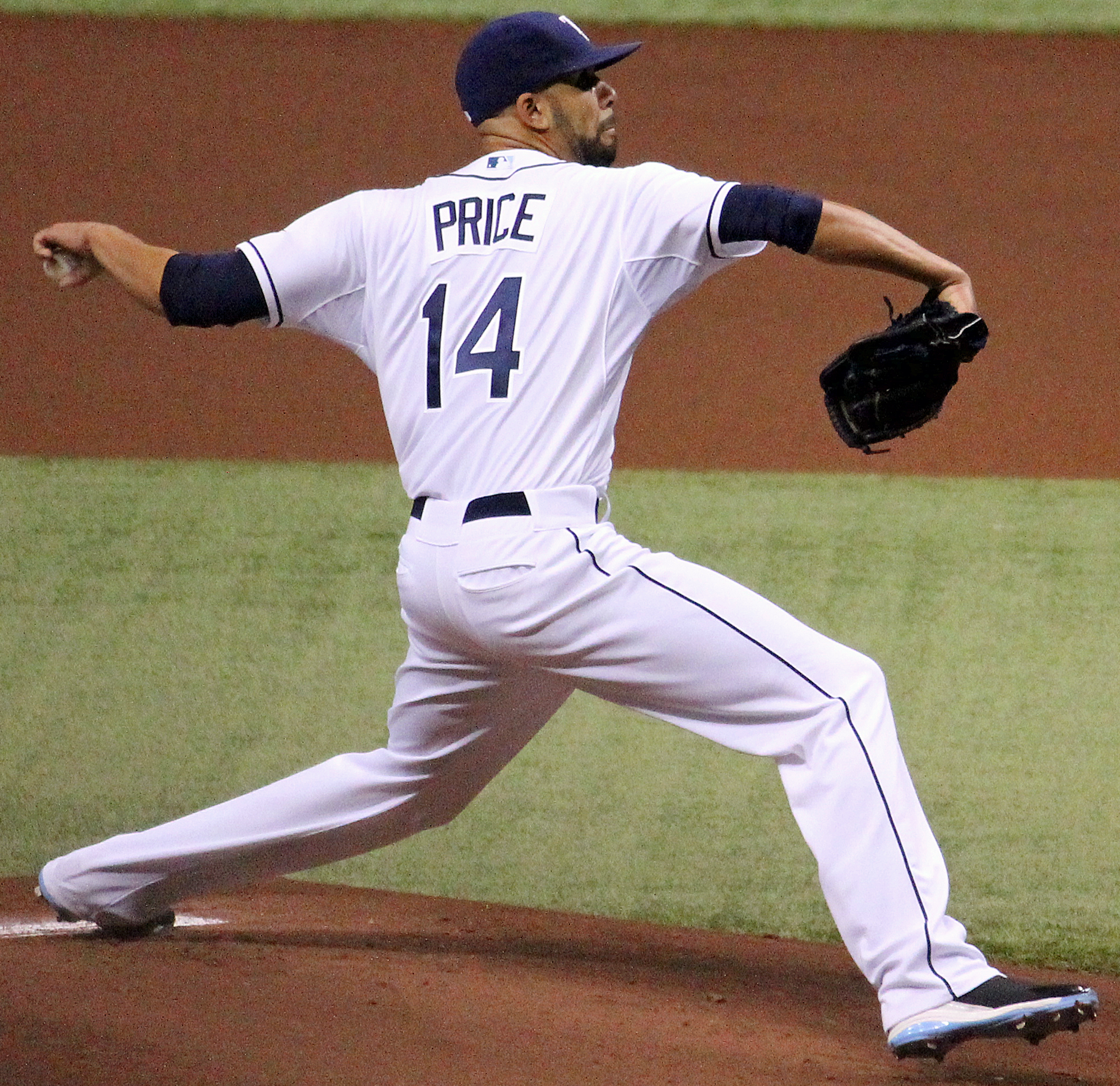
Tampa Bay selected David Price first overall. Price is a 5× All-Star who won the 2012 American League Cy Young Award.

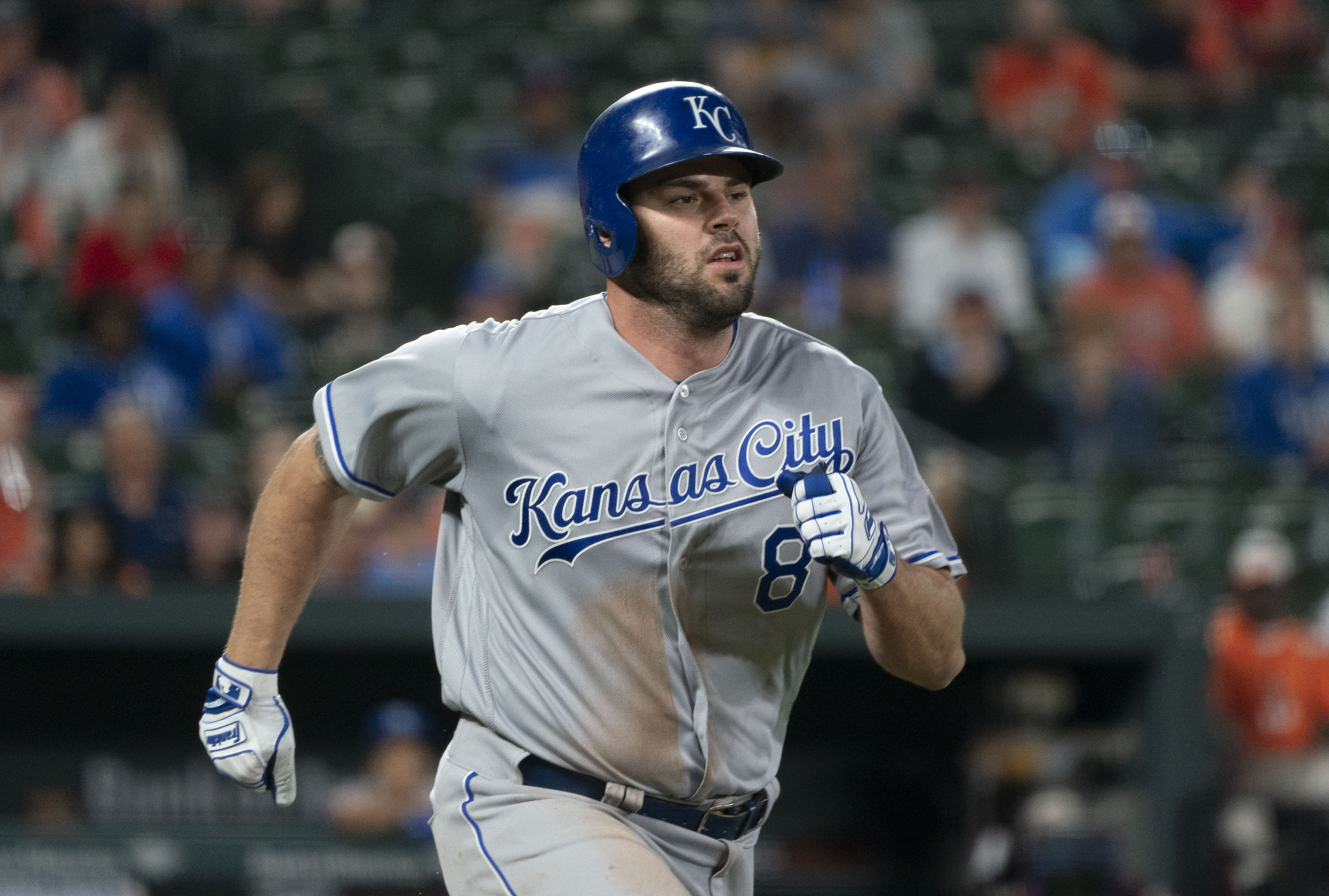
The Royals selected Mike Moustakas second overall. Moustakas is a 3× All-Star.

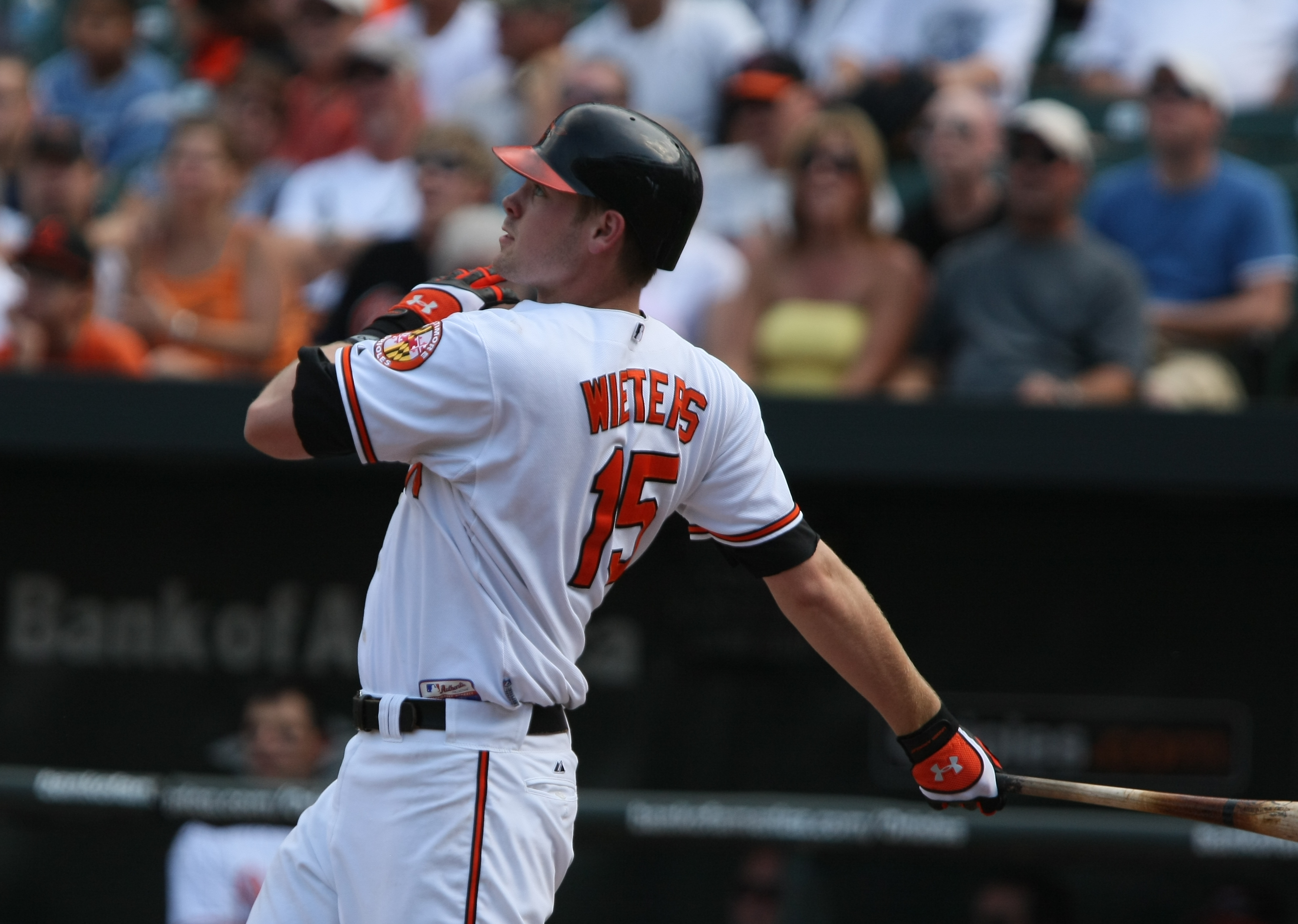
Baltimore selected Matt Wieters fifth overall. Wieters is a 4× All-Star and 2× Gold Glove winner at catcher.

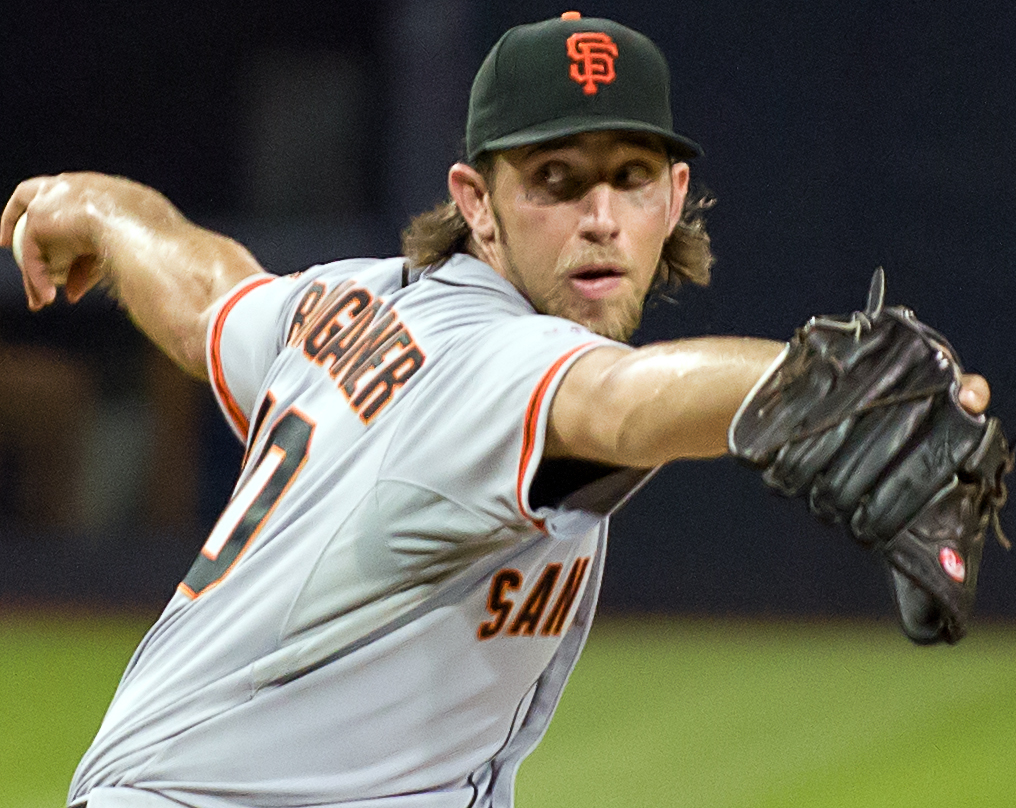
The San Francisco Giants selected Madison Bumgarner tenth overall. The 4× All-Star won the 2010, 2012, and 2014 World Series. He was named both the NLCS MVP and World Series MVP in 2014.

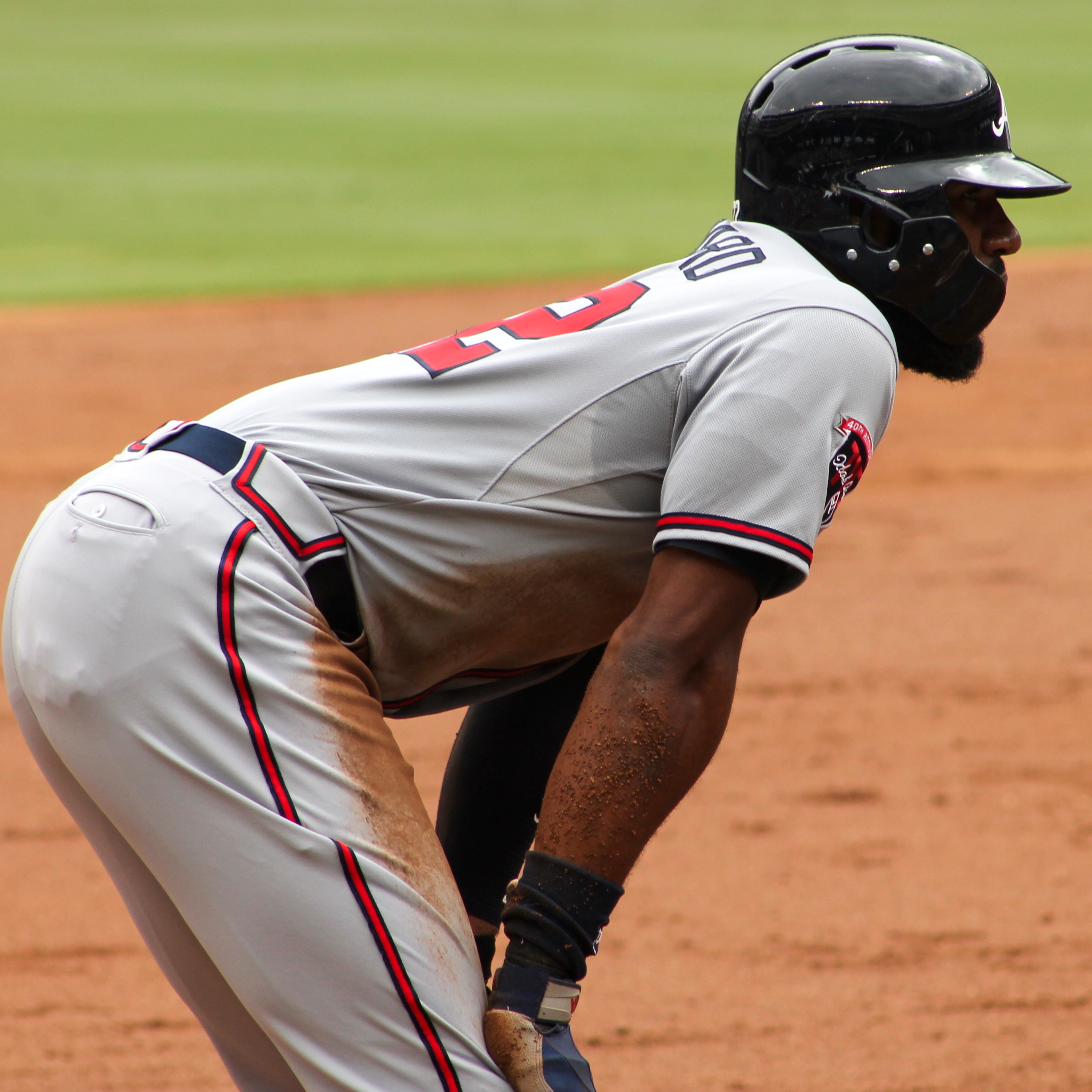
Atlanta selected Jason Heyward 14th overall. Heyward is a 2010 All-Star and 5× Gold Glove winner.

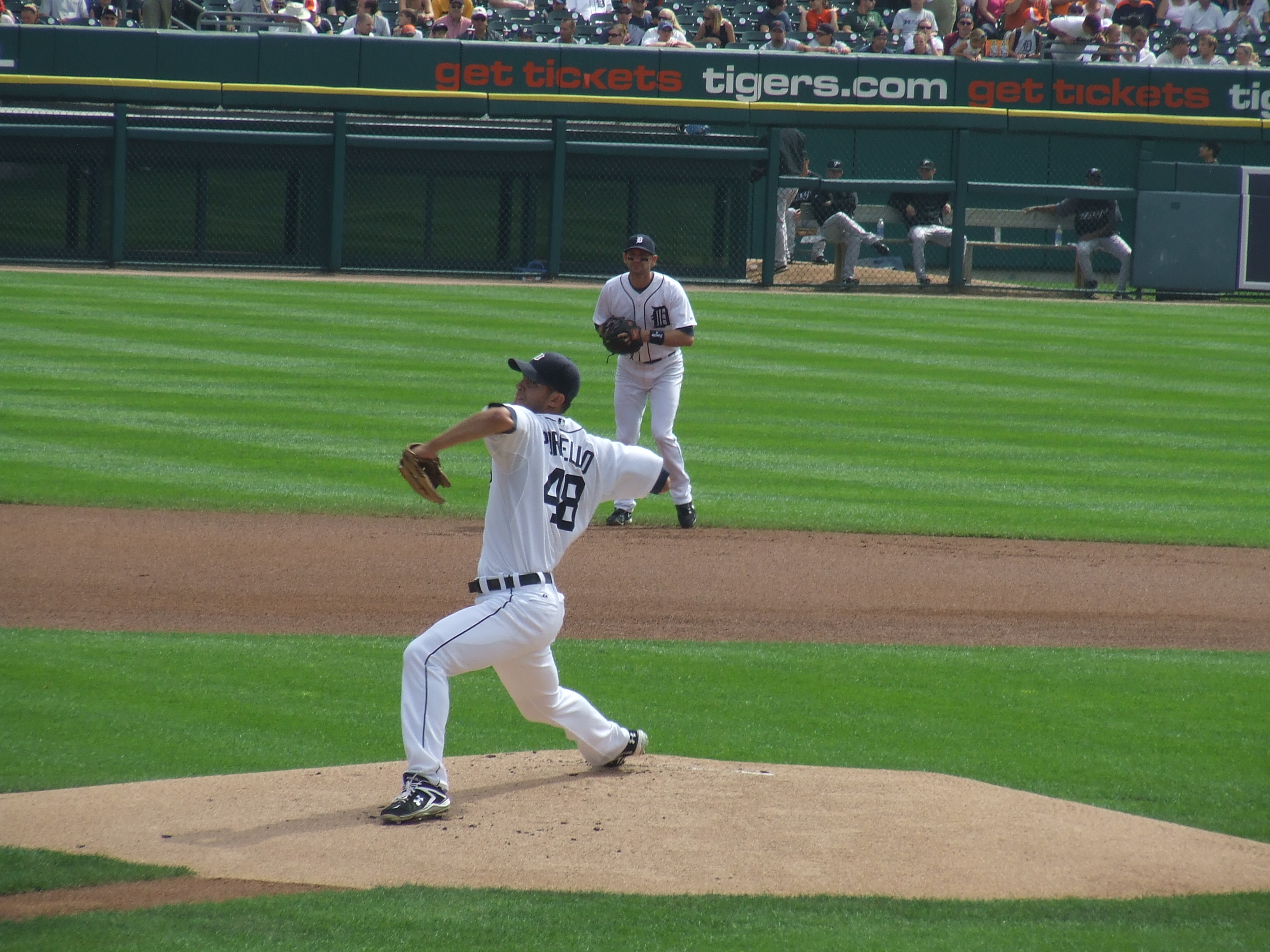
The Tigers selected Rick Porcello 27th overall. Porcello won the 2016 Cy Young and Comeback Player of the Year awards,

= All-Star
= Never played in the Major Leagues

Pick	Player	Team	Position	School
1	David Price	Tampa Bay Devil Rays	Pitcher	Vanderbilt
2	Mike Moustakas	Kansas City Royals	Shortstop	Chatsworth High School (CA)
3	Josh Vitters	Chicago Cubs	Third baseman	Cypress High School (CA)
4	Daniel Moskos	Pittsburgh Pirates	Pitcher	Clemson
5	Matt Wieters	Baltimore Orioles	Catcher	Georgia Tech
6	Ross Detwiler	Washington Nationals	Pitcher	Missouri State
7	Matt LaPorta	Milwaukee Brewers	Outfielder	Florida
8	Casey Weathers	Colorado Rockies	Pitcher	Vanderbilt
9	Jarrod Parker	Arizona Diamondbacks	Pitcher	Norwell High School (IN)
10	Madison Bumgarner	San Francisco Giants	Pitcher	South Caldwell High School (NC)
11	Phillippe Aumont	Seattle Mariners	Pitcher	École secondaire du Versant (QC)
12	Matt Dominguez	Florida Marlins	Third baseman	Chatsworth High School (CA)
13	Beau Mills	Cleveland Indians	First baseman	Lewis-Clark State (ID)
14	Jason Heyward	Atlanta Braves	Outfielder	Henry County High School (GA)
15	Devin Mesoraco	Cincinnati Reds	Catcher	Punxsutawney High School (PA)
16	Kevin Ahrens	Toronto Blue Jays (Note: Pick from Texas Rangers as compensation for signing of free agent Frank Catalanotto)	Shortstop	Memorial High School (TX)
17	Blake Beavan	Texas Rangers (Note: Pick from Houston Astros as compensation for loss of free agent Carlos Lee)	Pitcher	Irving High School (TX)
18	Peter Kozma	St. Louis Cardinals	Shortstop	Owasso High School (OK)
19	Joe Savery	Philadelphia Phillies	Pitcher	Rice
20	Chris Withrow	Los Angeles Dodgers (Note: Pick from Boston Red Sox as compensation for loss of free agent Julio Lugo)	Pitcher	Midland Christian High School (TX)
21	J. P. Arencibia	Toronto Blue Jays	Catcher	Tennessee
22	Tim Alderson	San Francisco Giants (Note: Pick from Los Angeles Dodgers as compensation for loss of free agent Jason Schmidt)	Pitcher	Horizon High School (AZ)
23	Nick Schmidt	San Diego Padres	Pitcher	Arkansas
24	Michael Main	Texas Rangers (Note: Pick from Los Angeles Angels of Anaheim as compensation for loss of free agent Gary Matthews Jr.)	Pitcher	DeLand High School (FL)
25	Aaron Poreda	Chicago White Sox	Pitcher	San Francisco
26	James Simmons	Oakland Athletics	Pitcher	UC Riverside
27	Rick Porcello	Detroit Tigers	Pitcher	Seton Hall Preparatory School (NJ)
28	Ben Revere	Minnesota Twins	Outfielder	Lexington Catholic High School (KY)
29	Wendell Fairley	San Francisco Giants (Note: Pick from New York Mets as compensation for loss of free agent Moisés Alou)	Outfielder	George County High School (MS)
30	Andrew Brackman	New York Yankees	Pitcher	NC State

== Supplemental first round selections ==
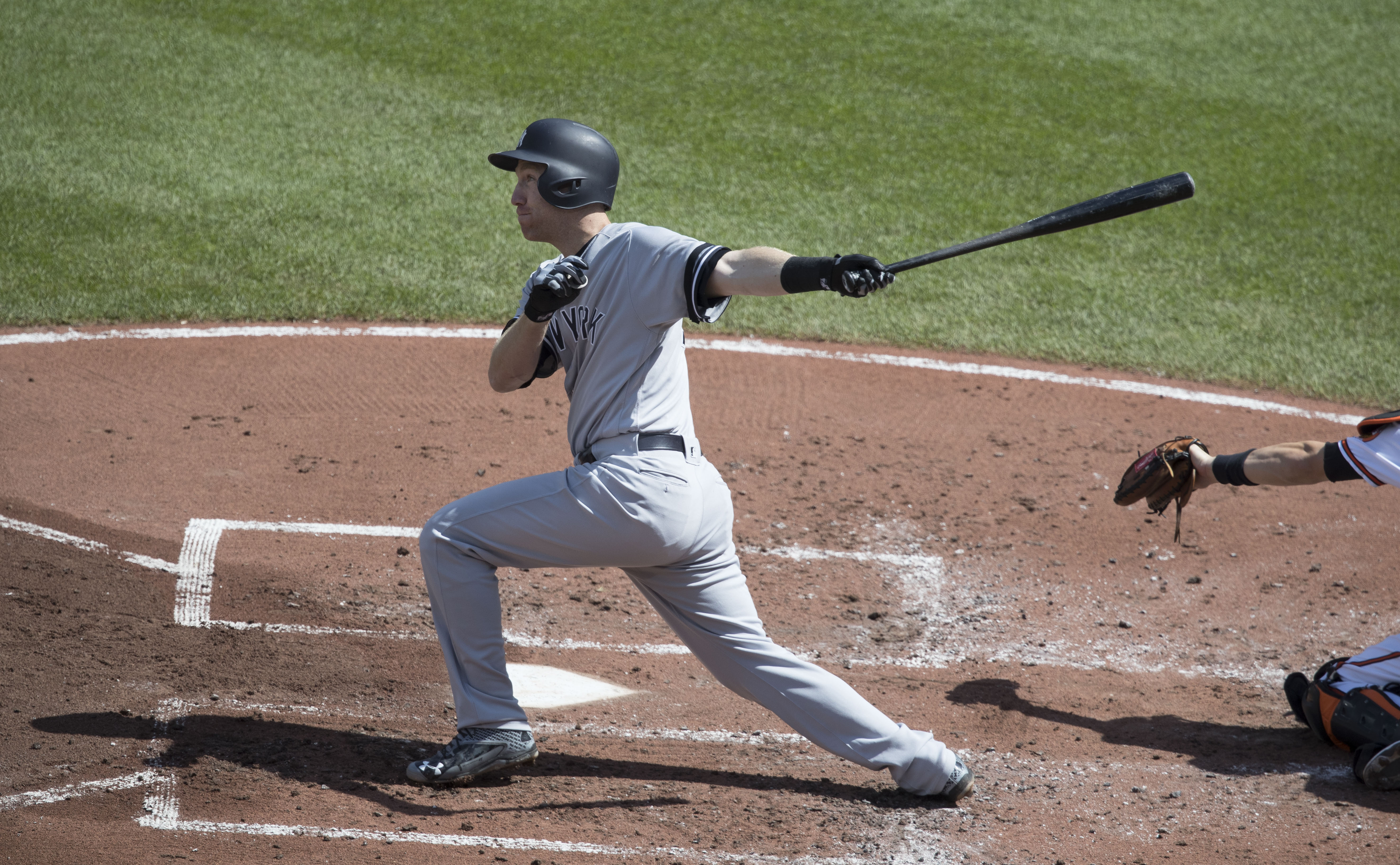
Cincinnati selected Todd Frazier 34th overall. Frazier is a two-time All-Star with the Reds.

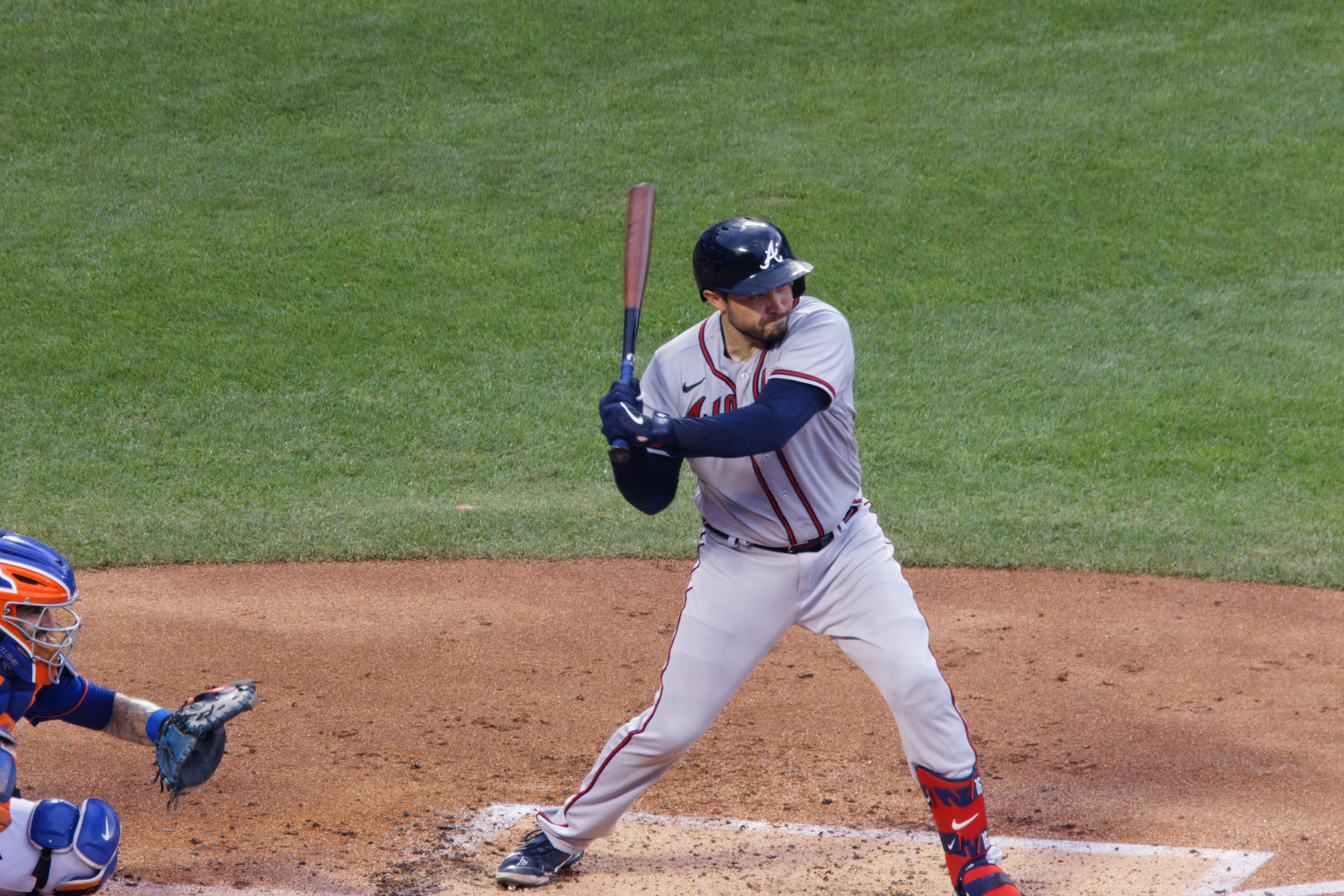
The Philadelphia Phillies selected Travis d'Arnaud 37th overall. d'Arnaud was a 2020 Silver Slugger at catcher, 2021 World Series champion, and a 2022 All-Star.

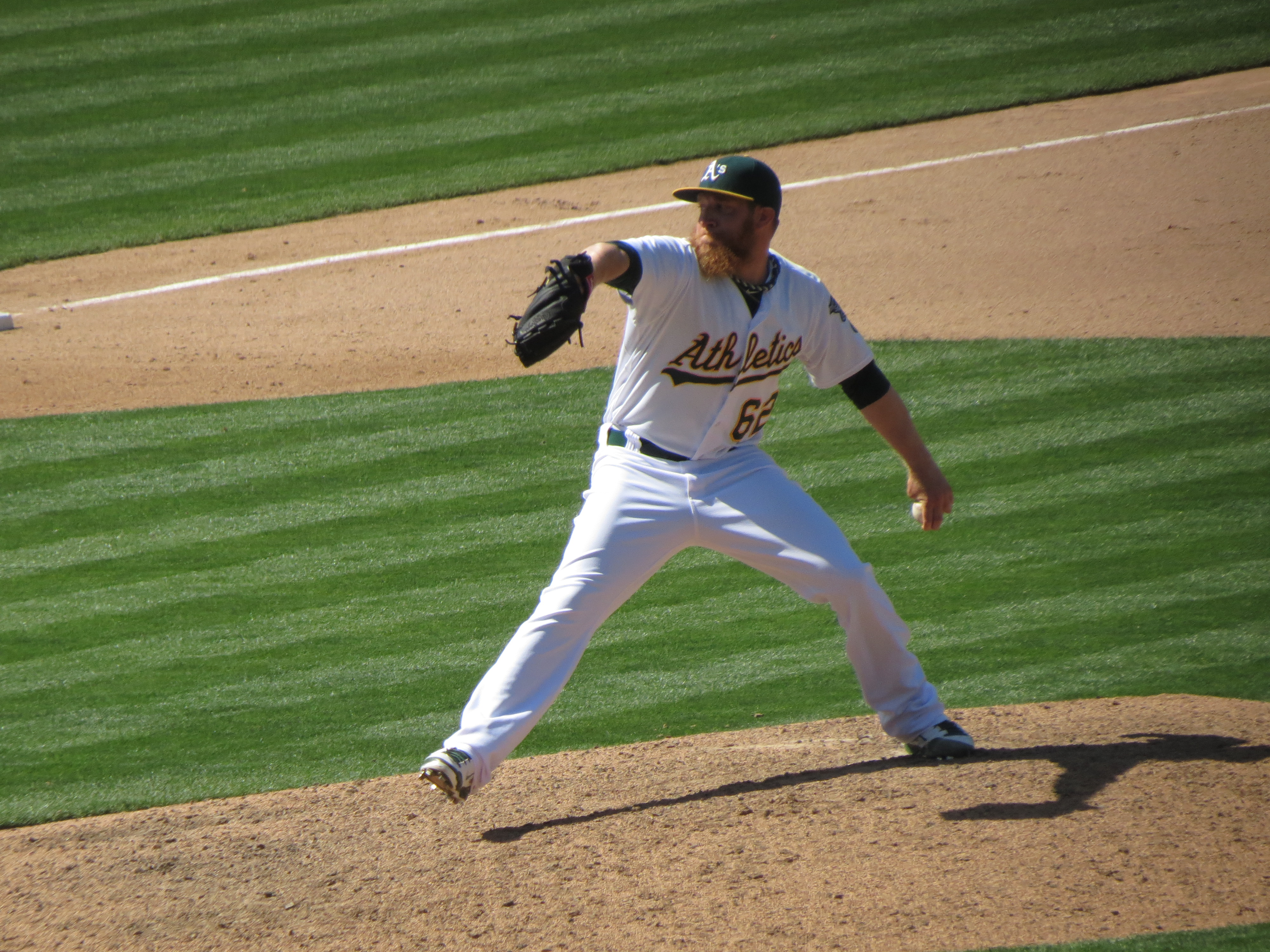
The Oakland A's selected Sean Doolittle 38th overall. Doolittle is a 2× All-Star.

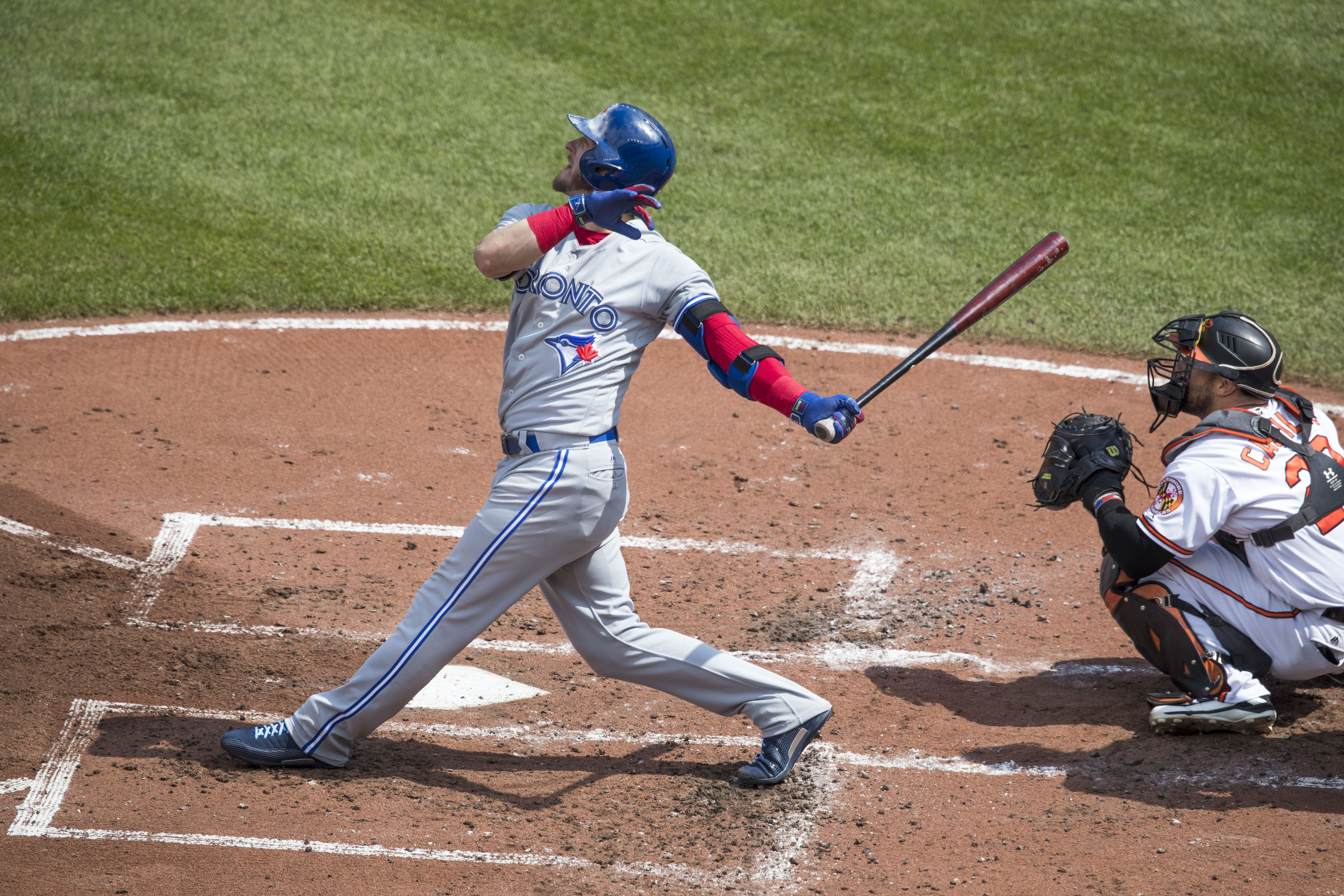
The Chicago Cubs selected Josh Donaldson 48th overall. the 3× All-Star, 2× Silver Slugger at third base, the American League Most Valuable Player Award in 2015.

Pick	Player	Team	Position	School
31	Josh Smoker	Washington Nationals (Note: Supplemental pick as compensation for loss of free agent Alfonso Soriano)	Pitcher	Calhoun High School (GA)
32	Nick Noonan	San Francisco Giants (Note: Supplemental pick as compensation for loss of free agent Moisés Alou)	Shortstop	Parker High School (CA)
33	Jon Gilmore	Atlanta Braves (Note: Supplemental pick as compensation for loss of free agent Danys Báez)	Third baseman	Iowa City High School (IA)
34	Todd Frazier	Cincinnati Reds (Note: Supplemental pick as compensation for loss of free agent Rich Aurilia)	Shortstop	Rutgers
35	Julio Borbon	Texas Rangers (Note: Supplemental pick as compensation for loss of free agent Carlos Lee)	Outfielder	Tennessee
36	Clayton Mortensen	St. Louis Cardinals (Note: Supplemental pick as compensation for loss of free agent Jeff Suppan)	Pitcher	Gonzaga
37	Travis d'Arnaud	Philadelphia Phillies (Note: Supplemental pick as compensation for loss of free agent David Dellucci)	Catcher	Lakewood High School (CA)
38	Brett Cecil	Toronto Blue Jays (Note: Supplemental pick as compensation for loss of free agent Justin Speier)	Pitcher	Maryland
39	James Adkins	Los Angeles Dodgers (Note: Supplemental pick as compensation for loss of free agent Julio Lugo)	Pitcher	Tennessee
40	Kellen Kulbacki	San Diego Padres (Note: Supplemental pick as compensation for loss of free agent Woody Williams)	Outfielder	James Madison
41	Sean Doolittle	Oakland Athletics (Note: Supplemental pick as compensation for loss of free agent Barry Zito)	First baseman	Virginia
42	Edward Kunz	New York Mets (Note: Supplemental pick as compensation for loss of free agent Roberto Hernández)	Pitcher	Oregon State
43	Jackson Williams	San Francisco Giants (Note: Supplemental pick as compensation for loss of free agent Jason Schmidt)	Catcher	Oklahoma
44	Neil Ramirez	Texas Rangers (Note: Supplemental pick as compensation for loss of free agent Gary Matthews Jr.)	Pitcher	Kempsville High School (VA)
45	Justin Jackson	Toronto Blue Jays (Note: Supplemental pick as compensation for loss of free agent Frank Catalanotto)	Shortstop	T. C. Roberson High School (NC)
46	Drew Cumberland	San Diego Padres (Note: Supplemental pick as compensation for loss of free agent Dave Roberts)	Shortstop	Pace High School (FL)
47	Nathan Vineyard	New York Mets (Note: Supplemental pick as compensation for loss of free agent Chad Bradford)	Pitcher	Woodland High School (GA)
48	Josh Donaldson	Chicago Cubs (Note: Supplemental pick as compensation for loss of free agent Juan Pierre)	Catcher	Auburn
49	Michael Burgess	Washington Nationals (Note: Supplemental pick as compensation for loss of free agent José Guillén)	Outfielder	Hillsborough High School (FL)
50	Wes Roemer	Arizona Diamondbacks (Note: Supplemental pick as compensation for loss of free agent Craig Counsell)	Pitcher	Cal State Fullerton
51	Charlie Culberson	San Francisco Giants (Note: Supplemental pick as compensation for loss of free agent Mike Stanton)	Shortstop	Calhoun High School (GA)
52	Matt Mangini	Seattle Mariners (Note: Supplemental pick as compensation for loss of free agent Gil Meche)	Third baseman	Oklahoma State
53	Kyle Lotzkar	Cincinnati Reds (Note: Supplemental pick as compensation for loss of free agent Scott Schoeneweis)	Pitcher	South Delta Secondary School (BC)
54	Tommy Hunter	Texas Rangers (Note: Supplemental pick as compensation for loss of free agent Mark DeRosa)	Pitcher	Alabama
55	Nick Hagadone	Boston Red Sox (Note: Supplemental pick as compensation for loss of free agent Álex González)	Pitcher	Washington
56	Trystan Magnuson	Toronto Blue Jays (Note: Supplemental pick as compensation for loss of free agent Ted Lilly)	Pitcher	Louisville
57	Mitchell Canham	San Diego Padres (Note: Supplemental pick as compensation for loss of free agent Chan Ho Park)	Catcher	Oregon State
58	Jonathan Bachanov	Los Angeles Angels of Anaheim (Note: Supplemental pick as compensation for loss of free agent Adam Kennedy)	Pitcher	University High School (FL)
59	Corey Brown	Oakland Athletics (Note: Supplemental pick as compensation for loss of free agent Frank Thomas)	Outfielder	Oklahoma State
60	Brandon Hamilton	Detroit Tigers (Note: Supplemental pick as compensation for loss of free agent Jamie Walker)	Pitcher	Stanhope Elmore High School (AL)
61	Ed Easley	Arizona Diamondbacks (Note: Supplemental pick as compensation for loss of free agent Miguel Batista)	Catcher	Mississippi State
62	Ryan Dent	Boston Red Sox (Note: Supplemental pick as compensation for loss of free agent Keith Foulke)	Shortstop	Wilson Classical High School (CA)
63	Cory Luebke	San Diego Padres (Note: Supplemental pick as compensation for loss of free agent Alan Embree)	Pitcher	Ohio State
64	Danny Payne	San Diego Padres (Note: Supplemental pick as compensation for loss of free agent Ryan Klesko)	Outfielder	Georgia Tech

== Other notable players ==
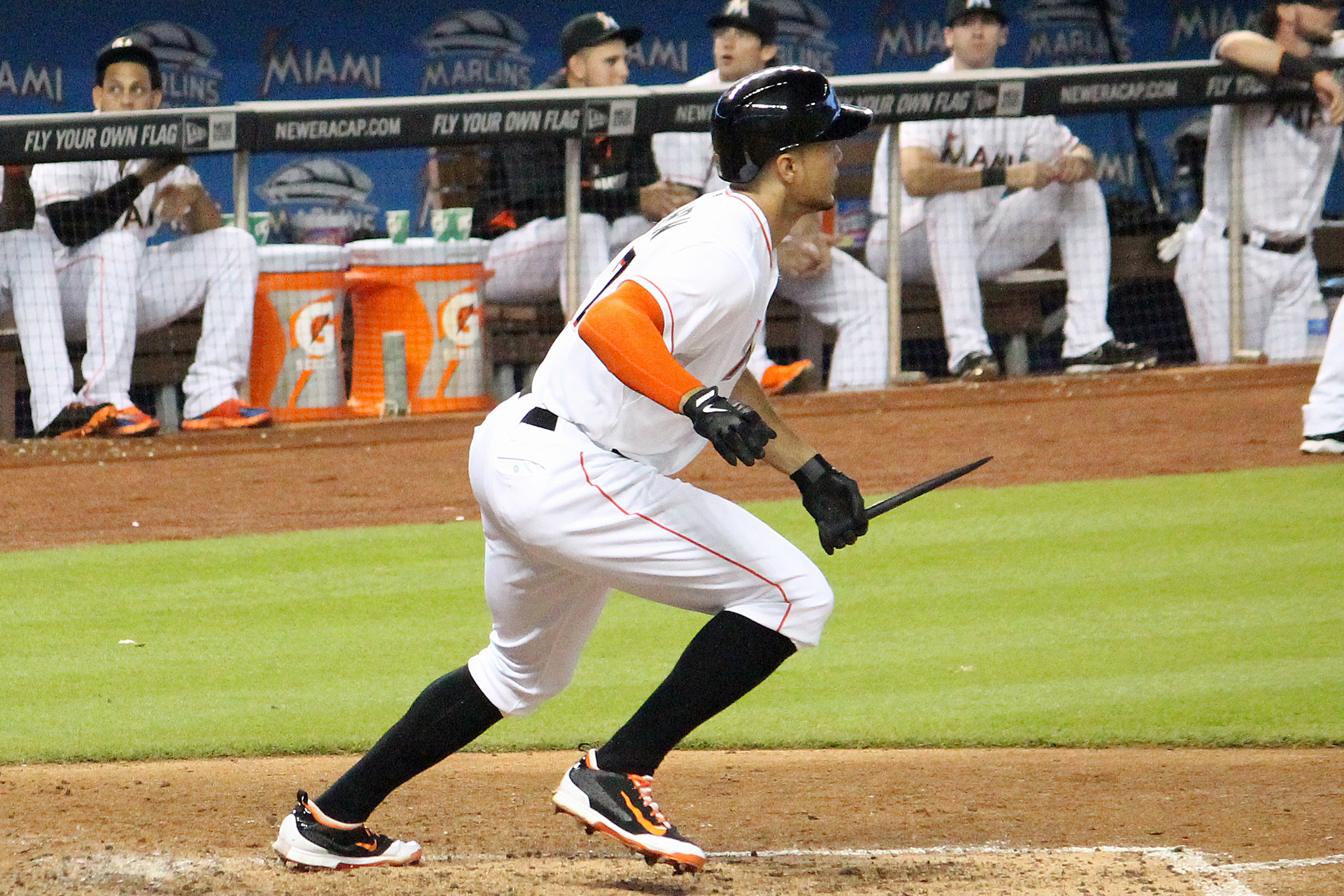
The Marlins selected Giancarlo Stanton in the 2nd round. The 5× All-Star was named the 2017 N.L. MVP.

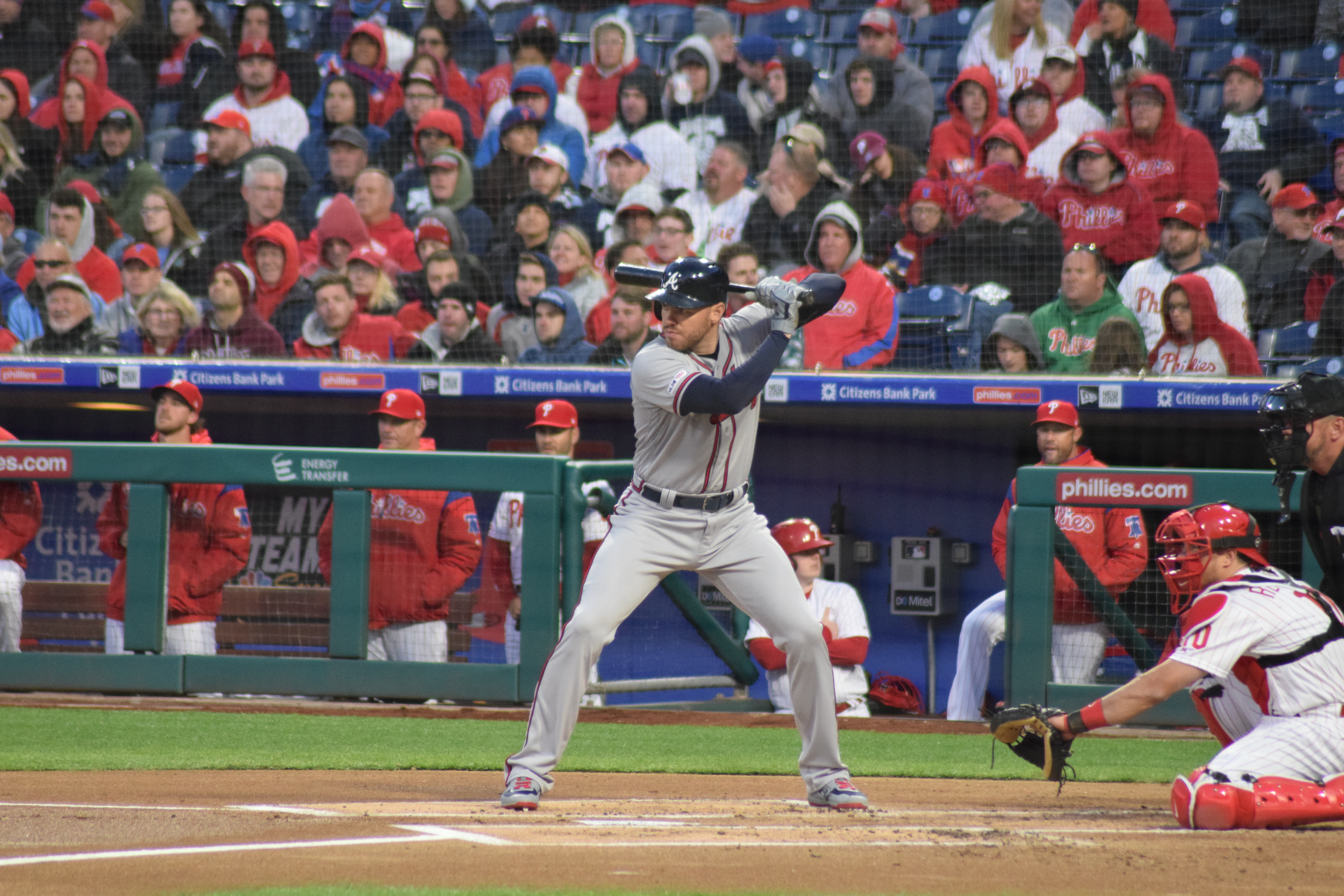
Atlanta selected Freddie Freeman in the 2nd round. The 7× All-Star was named the 2020 N.L. MVP.

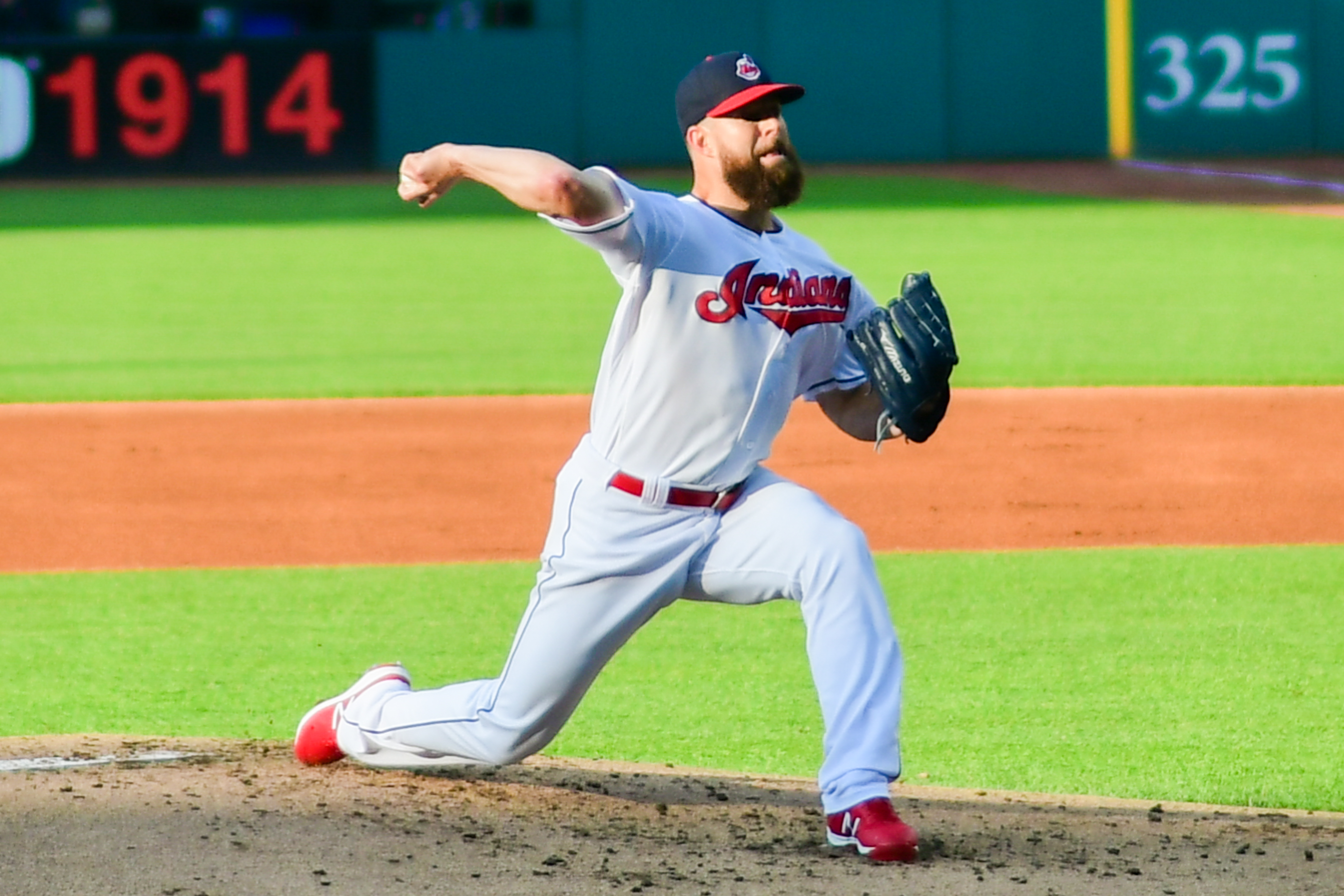
The Padres selected Corey Kluber in the 4th round. He is a 3× All-Star and 2× Cy Young Award winner.

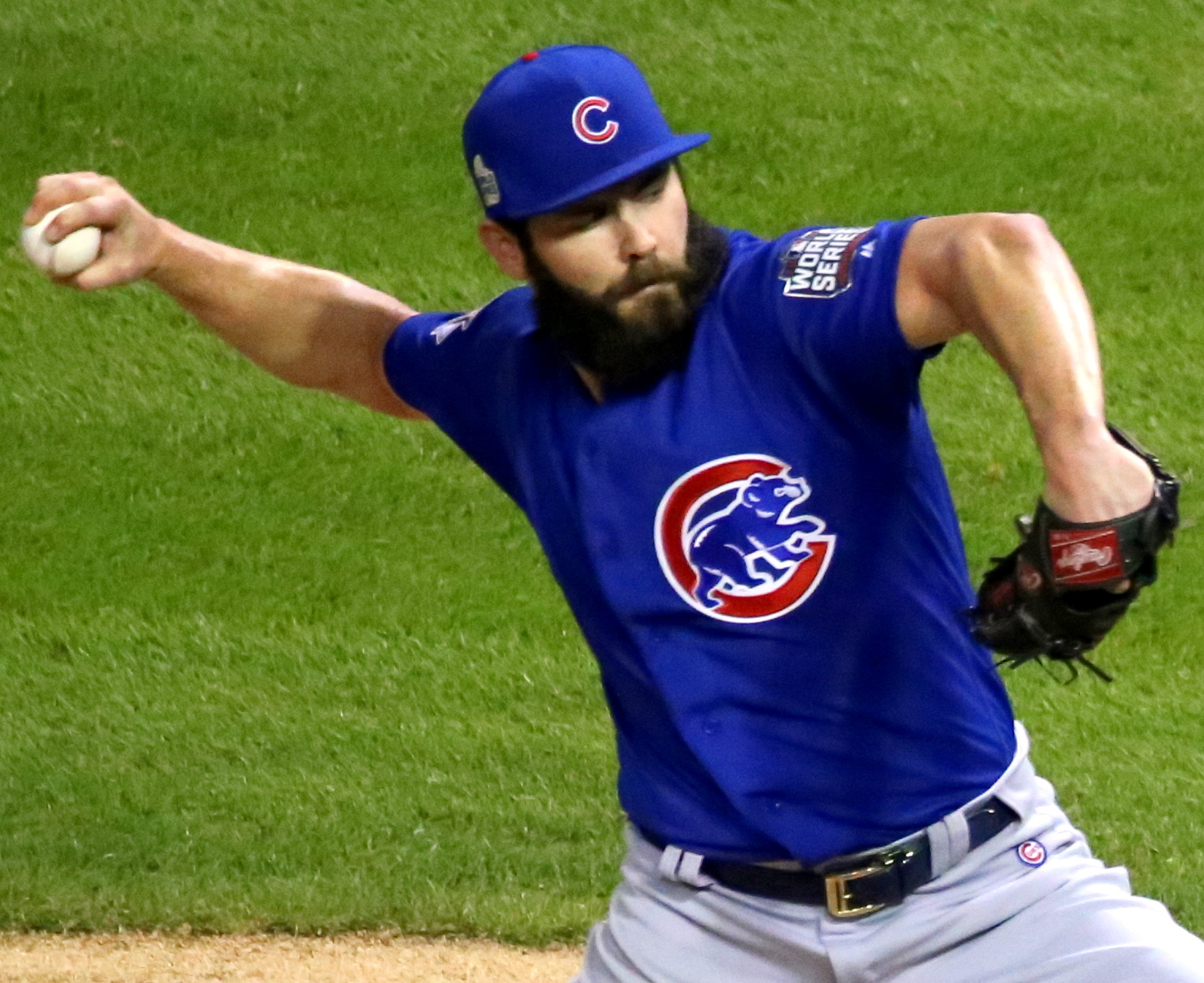
Jake Arrieta was selected in the 5th round by the Orioles. He won the 2015 N.L. Cy Young Award with the Cubs.

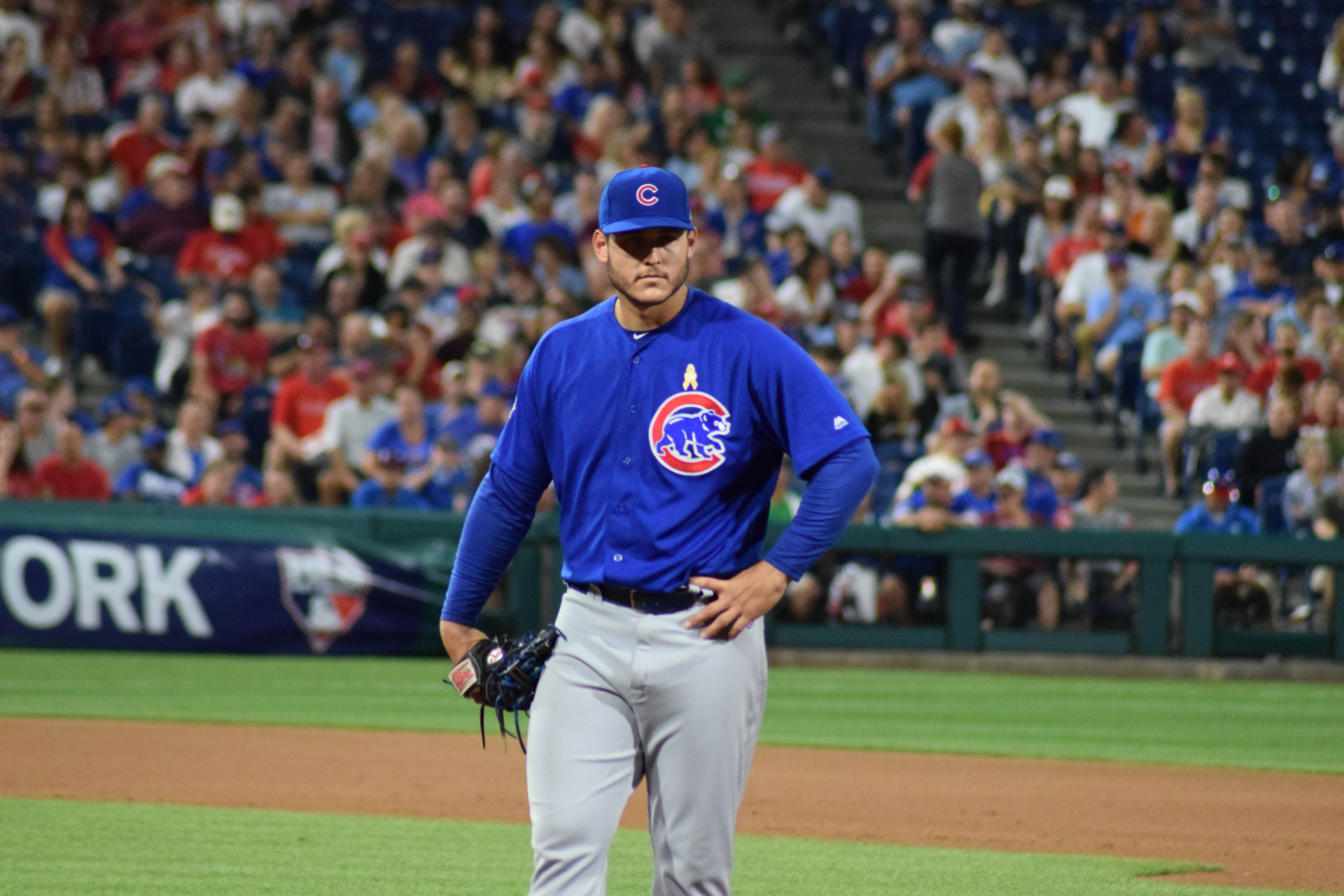
Boston selected Anthony Rizzo in the 6th round. The 3× All-Star is a 4× Gold Glove winner at first base, and the 2016 Silver Slugger at first base.

Key

	All-Star
*	Player did not sign

Round	Pick	Player	Team	Position	School
2	67	Jordan Zimmermann	Washington Nationals	Pitcher	University of Wisconsin-Stevens Point
2	76	Giancarlo Stanton	Florida Marlins	Outfielder	Notre Dame High School (CA)
2	78	Freddie Freeman	Atlanta Braves	First baseman	El Modena High School (CA)
2	79	Zack Cozart	Cincinnati Reds	Shortstop	Ole Miss
2	81	Eric Sogard	San Diego Padres	Second baseman	Arizona State
2	94	Austin Romine	New York Yankees	Catcher	El Toro High School (CA)
3	96	Danny Duffy	Kansas City Royals	Pitcher	Cabrillo High School (CA)
3	100	Steven Souza Jr.	Washington Nationals	Third baseman	Cascade High School (WA)
3	101	Jonathan Lucroy	Milwaukee Brewers	Catcher	Louisiana
3	112	Daniel Descalso	St. Louis Cardinals	Third baseman	UC Davis
3	118	Matt Harvey*	Los Angeles Angels	Pitcher	Fitch High School (CT)
4	127	Darwin Barney	Chicago Cubs	Shortstop	Oregon State
4	130	Derek Norris	Washington Nationals	Catcher	Goddard High School (KS)
4	134	Corey Kluber	San Diego Padres	Pitcher	Stetson
4	138	Cory Gearrin	Atlanta Braves	Pitcher	Mercer
4	151	Charlie Furbush	Detroit Tigers	Pitcher	LSU
5	159	Jake Arrieta	Baltimore Orioles	Pitcher	TCU
5	166	Steve Cishek	Florida Marlins	Pitcher	Carson-Newman University
5	174	Will Middlebrooks	Boston Red Sox	Third baseman	Liberty-Eylau High School (TX)
5	175	Marc Rzepczynski	Toronto Blue Jays	Pitcher	UC Riverside
5	178	Andrew Romine	Los Angeles Angels	Shortstop	Arizona State
5	179	Nate Jones	Chicago White Sox	Pitcher	Northern Kentucky
6	186	Fernando Cruz	Kansas City Royals	Shortstop	Puerto Rico Advancement College
6	204	Anthony Rizzo	Boston Red Sox	First baseman	Marjory Stoneman Douglas High School (FL)
6	208	Ryan Brasier	Los Angeles Angels	Pitcher	Weatherford College
7	243	Lucas Duda	New York Mets	First baseman	USC
8	245	Matt Moore	Tampa Bay Rays	Pitcher	Moriarty High School (NM)
9	295	Marcus Walden	Toronto Blue Jays	Pitcher	Fresno City College
10	306	Greg Holland	Kansas City Royals	Pitcher	Western Carolina
10	327	Christian Colón	San Diego Padres	Shortstop	Canyon High School (Santa Clarita, California) (CA)
11	336	David Lough	Kansas City Royals	Outfielder	Mercyhurst College
11	348	Brandon Belt*	Atlanta Braves	First baseman	San Jacinto College
11	354	Ryan Pressly	Boston Red Sox	Pitcher	Marcus High School (TX)
12	365	Stephen Vogt	Tampa Bay Devil Rays	Catcher	Azusa Pacific
12	394	Manny Barreda	New York Yankees	Pitcher	Sahuarita High School (AZ)
13	405	Shawn Kelley	Seattle Mariners	Pitcher	Austin Peay
14	427	James Russell	Chicago Cubs	Pitcher	Texas
15	463	Josh Collmenter	Arizona Diamondbacks	Pitcher	Central Michigan
16	503	Brian Schlitter	Philadelphia Phillies	Pitcher	Charleston
17	530	Mitch Moreland	Texas Rangers	First baseman	Mississippi State
18	564	Hunter Strickland	Boston Red Sox	Pitcher	Pike County High School (GA)
20	612	Matt Reynolds	Colorado Rockies	Pitcher	Austin Peay
21	642	Chris Sale*	Colorado Rockies	Pitcher	Lakeland High School (FL)
21	663	Dillon Gee	New York Mets	Pitcher	UT-Arlington
27	834	Yasmani Grandal*	Boston Red Sox	Catcher	Miami Springs High School (FL)
28	872	Seth Rosin*	Minnesota Twins	Pitcher	Mounds View High School (MN)
29	877	Andrew Cashner*	Chicago Cubs	Pitcher	Angelina College
30	923	Jake Diekman	Philadelphia Phillies	Pitcher	Cloud County Community College
30	927	Dylan Axelrod	San Diego Padres	Pitcher	UC Irvine
33	1,006	Craig Kimbrel*	Atlanta Braves	Pitcher	Wallace State Community College
34	1,050	Drew Storen*	New York Yankees	Pitcher	Brownsburg High School (IN)

=== NFL players drafted ===
- Dennis Dixon, 5th round, 168th overall by the Atlanta Braves
- Pat White, 27th round, 838th overall by the Los Angeles Angels of Anaheim, but did not sign
- Russell Wilson, 41st round, 1,222nd overall by the Baltimore Orioles, but did not sign
- Golden Tate, 42nd round, 1,252nd overall by the Arizona Diamondbacks, but did not sign

== Background ==
Ross Detwiler was the first 2007 draftee to play in the major leagues.

David Price became the first player from the 2007 draft to be the starting pitcher of an All-Star Game in 2010. He was also the first pitcher to pitch in the postseason and World Series pitching in relief for the 2008 Tampa Bay Rays in the 2008 World Series. He was also the first player in this draft to win a Cy Young Award (which he won in 2012).

Jason Heyward became the first position player from the 2007 draft to be a starter of an All-Star Game in 2010.

Rick Porcello was the first player from the 2007 draft to be named as a starter at the outset of the season from spring training. He initially started the 2009 season in the fifth rotation spot for the Detroit Tigers but by mid-season was promoted to the third starter.

Madison Bumgarner was the first 2007 draftee to win the World Series, with the San Francisco Giants in 2010. He also was the first player to win the World Series MVP award, which he won in 2014.

Preceded by Luke Hochevar	1st Overall Picks; David Price	Succeeded by Tim Beckham
