= Saint-Louis Street =

Main street in Gatineau, Quebec, Canada

Rue Saint-Louis is a main street in Gatineau, Quebec, Canada, that runs mostly along the north and east side of the Gatineau River in the old city of Gatineau. It starts at the boundaries of the city of Gatineau and the suburban town of Cantley, Quebec and ends at Boulevard Maloney. On its northern end until Autoroute 50, it runs parallel to the Gatineau River, while it briefly runs parallel to the Ottawa River on its eastern end.

Prior to the amalgamation of the city of Gatineau, Rue Saint-Louis was a relatively minor street in the Pointe-Gatineau/La Baie neighbourhood that ran from east of Boulevard Greber to Rue Jacques-Cartier where it became former Avenue Du Golf (Golf Avenue) for the remaining stretch on to Boulevard Maloney. Between Autoroute 50 and Boulevard Greber, it was formerly known as Boulevard Archambault, a small residential artery through the western portions of Pointe-Gatineau.

Through most of the stretch between Autoroute 50 and Cantley, Rue Saint-Louis is also known as Route 307. That section was formerly known as Avenue Principale before the 2002 amalgamation - this street name is not to be confused with Rue Principale, which is for the former city of Aylmer's main commercial area.

This street is the location of the Collège Saint-Alexandre, a private secondary school, one of two in the city, the other being the Collège Saint-Joseph de Hull institution for girls. A professional education centre is also located a few blocks away It is also home to La Baie Park which is the site of the city's annual Gatineau Hot Air Balloon Festival, and the Bowater plant.

== Alonzo Wright Bridge ==
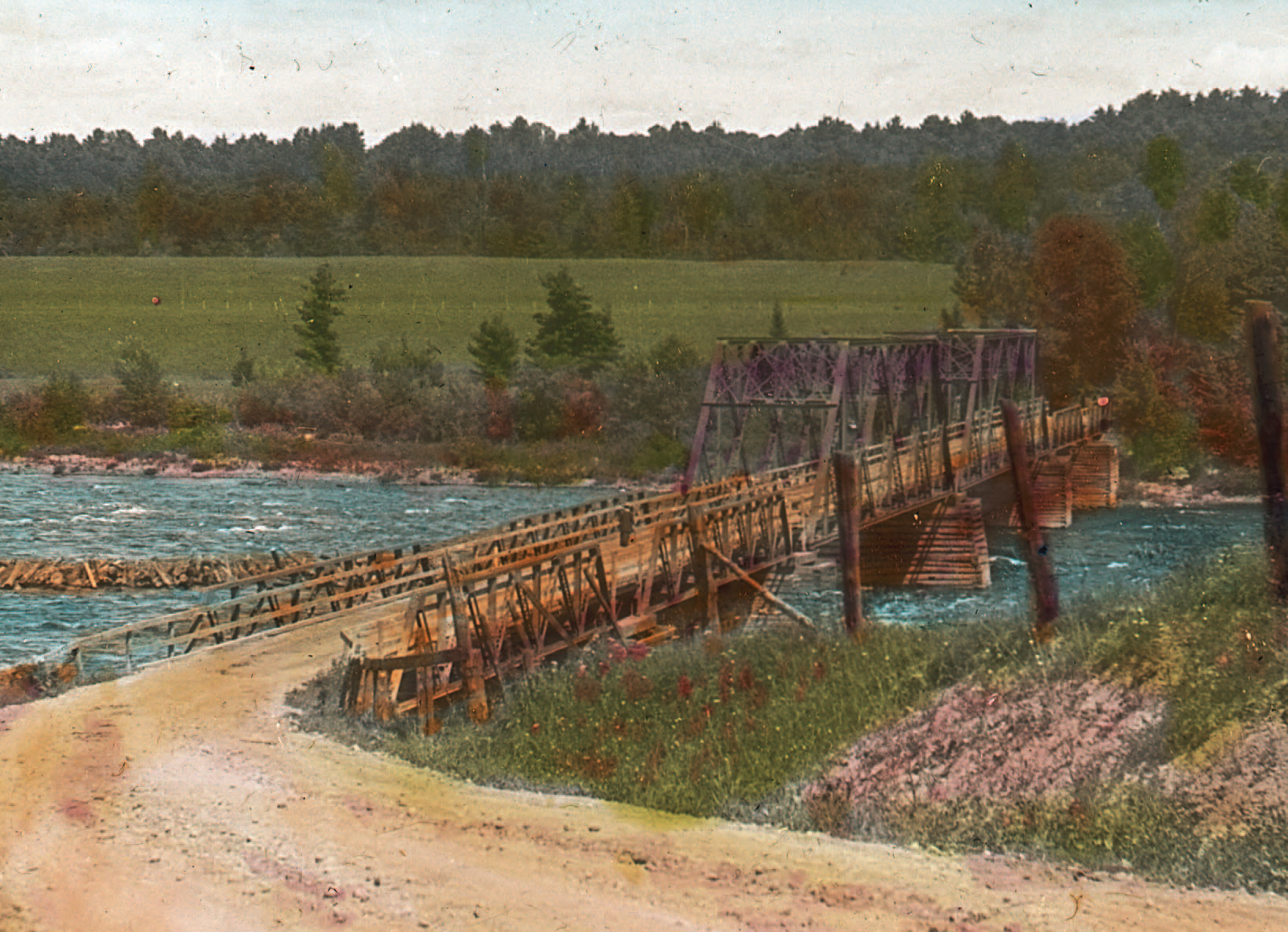
The bridge, circa 1920, looking east.

The busiest section of the road is located near the Alonzo Wright Bridge at the corner of Boulevard La Vérendrye. Traffic coming from Cantley, Touraine, Limbour, Côte d'Azur, Mont-Luc and other areas further east all meet up at that location, causing significant slowdowns during rush hours. It also serves as an alternative route to Autoroute 50 when it is either closed or completely congested in the morning and afternoon. The same situation occurs during the rush hour on Route 105 in Chelsea which connects the bridge.

The situation had deteriorated when Boulevard La Vérendrye was extended west to connect with the bridge in 1999 as well extensive housing developments in Limbour, Mont-Luc and Cantley. There are plans to widen the bridge, which was built in 1964, to possibly four lanes but they have not advanced past the preliminary stages. In addition, plans for Autoroute 550 would have seen an additional bridge further upstream. Since its opening, there haven't been any major changes to the bridge's structure despite the rapid traffic growth. A large piece of concrete fell into the Gatineau River leaving a hole in the eastbound lane and concerns about the structure of the bridge. The trailer of an automobile was also caught in the hole. Workers had patch the hole a few hours after the incident.

== Neighbourhoods ==
- La Baie
- Tecumseh
- Pointe-Gatineau
- Touraine/Riviera
- Côte d'Azur
- Limbour/Les Jardins de l'Escarpement

== See also ==
- List of Gatineau roads
