= Collège Saint-Joseph de Hull =

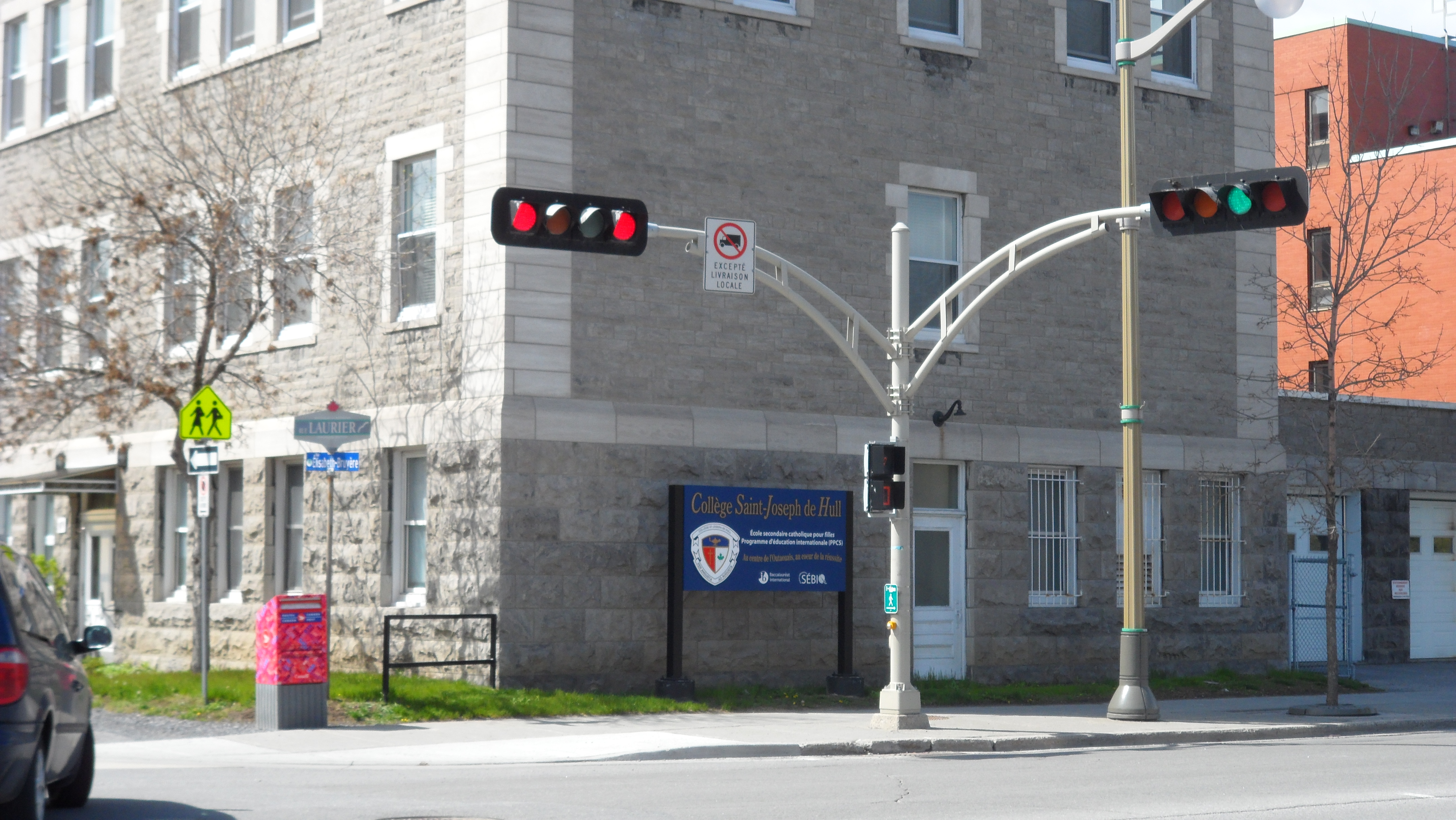

Location
- 174, rue Notre-Dame de l'Île; Gatineau, Quebec, J8X 3T4; Canada; 45.4315°N 75.7105°W

Information
- School type: High school
- Founded: 1870 (The Saint-Joseph name was adopted in 1909)
- School board: Directeur Général - M. Pierre Ménard; Directrice des services au élèves - Mme Catherine Desjardins; Directeur des services pédagogiques - M. Mathieu Noppen; Directrice des services financiers - Mme Marie-Paule Thérien
- Grades: Secondary 1 to 5
- Enrollment: 850 girls
- Language: French
- Website: www.collegestjoseph.ca

College Saint-Joseph de Hull is a private school for girls in Gatineau, Quebec, near the Canadian Museum of History and Jacques Cartier Park. It is located at the corner of Rue Laurier, Boulevard des Allumettières (formerly Boulevard Saint-Laurent) and the Alexandra Bridge in the Old Hull sector.

== History ==
=== Early years (1860–1909) ===
The current name of the school was implemented in 2001, however the history of what would become the current Saint-Joseph College goes back to the 19th century. For over a century, education in Quebec was under control by the Catholic Church. In 1864, the Notre-Dame parish, with Father Louis Reboul implemented its first school, in the primary level, consisting of two segregated groups of girls and boys. The institution was called "La Chapelle des Chantiers" and instructors were from the Sisters Charity of Ottawa under Élisabeth Bruyère. The organisation remained involved with the institution until 2001.

In 1869, due to an increasing demand, a new chapel was built across from the current location of the Canadian Museum of Civilization and the Scott Paper Plant. A new school with several classes was built and was only accessible for girls in the primary level. The classes for boys remained at what was called the Saint-Etienne school a few blocks to the north. There would also be classes in English starting in 1867 in addition to those in French.

The demand continuously grew over the years and a new building as well as an abbey were built between 1870 and 1876 to accommodate extra classes in a private school called "l'Academie Notre-Dame de Grace". It was later destroyed when a large portion of the former City of Hull was destroyed by a massive fire in 1888. A new non-private school was rebuilt in stone in 1890 and also included an abbey. The building was not affected by the Great Fire of 1900 that destroyed a large portion of downtown Hull and the Lebreton Flats area Ottawa located just to the south and west of the school complex.

=== Ecole Normale Saint-Joseph (1909–1968) ===
In 1909, the building was renamed Ecole Normale Saint-Joseph and remained unchanged until 1968. However, due to an increasing demand, renovations were made in the 1930s, during the Great Depression to add more students. In 1950, a massive fire at the school killed 4 people and destroyed much of the structure including the abbey. Rapidly, the school was rebuilt and classes resumed shortly after. In 1965, while the school only included students from the elementary (primary) level, a new secondary level was added due to the high demand.

=== High school (1968–2001) ===
In 1968, classical courses were abolished after a series of intensive reforms made by the Quebec Liberal government under Jean Lesage during the Quiet Revolution Era in the 1960s in which the province acquired the quasi-exclusive jurisdiction of education in Quebec. The Ecole Normale was converted to a high school but was still a private institution and was still under control by a religious corporation. In 1970, it became only an institution of the secondary level and only girls were admitted to the school.

=== Lay institution (2001–present) ===
It was only in 2001 that the secondary school became a lay institution, when the Sisters of Charity of Ottawa were replaced for a more traditional institution. It was then renamed to its current name. It still operates at the secondary level and remains as a private school like Collège Saint-Alexandre, the other private secondary level school in Gatineau.

Saint-Joseph is considered one of the highest-ranked schools in the province of Quebec. In the Outaouais region, it has been ranked the best school before Saint-Alexandre.

In 2007, a new management team took control of the college and planned to introduced a new international program starting in September 2007.

== Facts ==
- 850 girls from across the city of Gatineau and other near regions attend courses at Saint-Joseph College.
- There are 3 terms in a school year similar to public schools in the province of Quebec. The first one begins in August, the second in November and the third in March. Final exams are held in the last week of June.
- In 2007/08, there was an international education program offered to first year students.
- The school offers instructional courses on babysitting and emergency rescuing.
- Uniforms, consisting of white shirts, red skirts and dark shoes are mandatory. Until 2001, the uniforms consisted of white blouses and a blue skirt. While Saint-Joseph was the only educational institution in the Gatineau region to impose uniforms for several years, Saint-Alexandre and the Polyvalente de l'Érablière would later adopt a strict clothing policy including uniforms.
- The motto of the school is Per Angusta, Ad Augusta (Par dure labeur, à noble but.)
- Sports and activities include badminton, cross-country, track and field, volleyball, basketball and soccer. Saint-Joseph's sports team is the Zenith
- Organised activities during the school year include a "Carnival", Christmas Party, annual ski club, two yearly music concerts by the various school bands and a theater group for fifth year students.
