= Polyvalente Le Carrefour =

Coordinates: 45°28′23″N 75°41′54″W

École Polyvalente Le Carrefour
- Current logo, 2023

Location
- 50, chemin de la Savane; Gatineau, Quebec, J8T 3N2; Canada

Information
- School type: High school
- Founded: 1974
- School board: Commission Scolaire des Draveurs
- Grades: Secondary 1-5
- Enrollment: 2,300 students
- Language: French
- Colours: Silver and Navy
- Mascot: 'Flash' the Cougar
- Team name: Cougars
- Website: www.csdraveurs.qc.ca/carrefour/
- Last updated: March 12, 2011

The École Polyvalente Le Carrefour is a public high school located in Gatineau, Quebec. It is run by the Commission Scolaire des Draveurs school board in Gatineau and enrolls over 2,300 students and employs a staff of about 175 including teachers, administration and custodial staff.

== Location ==
The school is located in the centre of a major commercial district which includes in addition to Les Promenades de l'Outaouais, several strips malls as well as a clinic. It is located just across from the city's largest mall Les Promenades de l'Outaouais on Chemin de la Savane near Boulevard Greber.

The school itself contains an agora, several small sports and leisure infrastructures including a swimming pool, a gymnasium, a dance room, a weightlifting room as well as a large football field outside. Just south of the school, there is also a skateboard park and an ice skating rink called Stade Pierre-Lafontaine.

== International Program ==
Logo of the School

For over 10 years, the high school has offered an international program (initiated by UNESCO) to students in order to become more involved in the community, to initiate students to other cultures and traditions across the world and to be prepared for future studies at college and university. Generally, only high skilled students from the primary level have access to this program. Objectives and work projects are more demanding and Spanish is taught during the program in secondary 3 and 4.

== Dress code ==
In June 2007, in response to complaints, the school adopted a new dress code policy in which students would wear new uniforms including polo sweaters starting in September 2007. In a poll, 88% of parents were in favour of a new measure while the student population was split over the matter. This measure was deemed unfair by the students since their opinion was not taken into consideration. The school will become the second Gatineau public high school to adopt such policy after Polyvalente de l'Erabliere. However, in September 2008, the 'black' and 'navy blue' polos were made with a lighter fabric to suit the hot summer days. Since 2010, the students can wear white, blue, gray or black Polo shirt. Student can also wear long sleeve black vests.

== Saint-Jean Baptiste Day Concerts ==
Every June 23, there is a concert series held outside the school in the soccer field in conjunction with festivities surrounding the Saint-Jean Baptiste holiday.
