= Élisabeth Bruyère =

Élisabeth Bruyère SGM
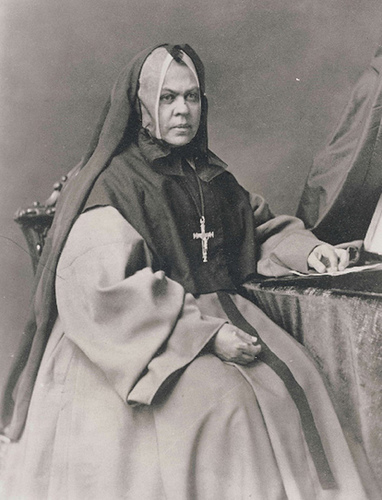
- Born: 19 March 1818; L'Assomption, Québec, Canada
- Died: 5 April 1876 (aged 58); Ottawa, Ontario, Canada

Élisabeth Bruyère (or Bruguier) (March 19, 1818 – April 5, 1876) was the founder of the Sisters of Charity of Bytown and opened the first hospital there and the first bilingual school in Ontario.

== Biography ==
She was born as Élisabeth Bruguier in L'Assomption in Lower Canada in 1818. Daughter of Jean Baptiste Charles Bruguier (1763-1824) and Sophie Mercier. The Bruguier name was changed in 1824 when the family moved after the death of her father.

In 1839, she joined the Sisters of Charity of the Hôpital Général of Montreal, also known as the Grey Nuns. In 1845, she was asked to set up a community of the Sisters of Charity at Bytown. With three other Grey Nuns, she established Roman Catholic schools, hospitals and orphanages there. In 1854, the community in Bytown became independent of Montreal. Although the Sisters of Charity cared for people of every religious denomination during the typhus outbreak in 1847, a Protestant General Hospital, later the Ottawa Civic Hospital, was opened in 1850. The Sisters of Charity were also responsible from 1870 to 2001 of the school which became today the Collège Saint-Joseph de Hull in Gatineau, the city's girl school and one of two private secondary institutions. The community opened other houses in Ontario, Quebec and New York state. The hospital opened in Bytown later became the Ottawa General Hospital. The Sisters of Charity also established facilities for the aged, opening the St. Charles Old Age Hospice, later the Residence Saint-Louis. She died in Ottawa on April 5, 1876.

== Legacy ==
Bruyère Health, located on the former site of the Ottawa General hospital, is named after her. For over 150 years, the Sisters of Charity of Ottawa have been a cornerstone of health care in Ottawa. Elisabeth Bruyère is credited with being the foundress of the associated Bruyère Foundation charitable organization.

The Ontario Heritage Trust erected a plaque for Elisabeth Bruyère 1818–1876 in front of the Chapel of the Sisters of Charity, 25 Bruyère Street, at Sussex Drive, Ottawa. "Arriving in Ottawa in 1845 with three other Grey Nuns, Bruyère immediately began to establish schools, hospitals, and other institutions to aid the disadvantaged. By the time of her death, the Sisters of Charity of Ottawa had extended their services to other parts of Canada and to the United States."
