= Polyvalente de l'Érablière =

Coordinates: 45°29′36″N 75°44′18″W

Polyvalente de l'Érabliere

Location
- 500, rue de Cannes; Gatineau, Quebec, J8V 1J6; Canada

Information
- School type: High school
- Founded: 1978
- School board: Centre de services scolaire des Draveurs
- School number: 067
- Principal: Sylvain Dault-Lagacé
- Grades: Secondary 1-5
- Enrollment: approx. 1500 students
- Language: French
- Website: erabliere.cssd.gouv.qc.ca

The Polyvalente de l'Érablière (or also called École Secondaire de l'Érabliere; English translation: Maple Tree High School) is a french language public high school located in Gatineau, Quebec. It is located in the Côte d'Azur/Limbour district of the Gatineau sector at the intersection of rue de Cannes and Boulevard la Verendrye.

== History ==
=== Start and development ===
The school is one of the largest high schools inside the city of Gatineau. It enrolls approximately 1,500 students from Secondary 1 to 5 and other groups such as the Cheminement Particulier Continu (Continuous Individual Advancement) and the Cheminement Particulier Temporaire (Temporary Individual Advancement).

It was opened in the Fall of 1978 and the student population came primarily from the surrounding Limbour and Mont-Luc and Touraine subdivisions. At that time, the school was built in the middle of a large vacant field with little development around it. Today, several condominium projects have been built around the school. In addition, Boulevard La Vérendrye was also extended in 1999 as a freeway towards the Alonzo Wright Bridge with a partial interchange connecting the school. Also, multiple bike paths were built in the vicinity south towards Mont-Luc, Cantley and the lower Limbour area, west towards rue Saint-Louis, Chelsea and the Hull sector and east towards the lower Côte d'Azur area, Touraine and eastern section of the Gatineau sector. Additionally, a large stairwell at the back of the school offers an easier access to students from the Mont Luc and Limbour areas. The stairwell was subject to controversy in 1993 when the school administration criticized the former city of Gatineau for using property that belonged to the Commission Scolaire des Draveurs. The project was halted but later completed after a compromise between the two parties.

Today, students come from all across the Gatineau sector and some from the Hull sector as well as from the Cantley and Val-des-Monts municipalities.

=== Uniform policy ===
In April 2004, the school administration, led by principal Micheline Boucher, decided to adopt a strict dress-code by imposing that all students wear uniforms, consisting of polos, shirts, sweaters and any suitable pants depending on the season.

After a delay of the delivery due to problems involving the distributor, Mini Polo, uniforms were distributed to all students by the end of 2004. New demands and new collections of uniforms were also responsible for the delay. There were also problems during the distribution of the uniforms when several of the articles were missing or not delivered properly. The problem was fully resolved by the end of 2004.

In addition to the difficulties surrounding the delivery, the dress-code was met with some opposition, mainly by the student population, some of which defied the new code. Prior to the official decision by the administration, a student petition was circulated to show their opposition to the new rule. However, a telephone survey conducted by the school's administration showed that 72% of parents were in favor of the use of the uniform at the l'Érablière High School

Prior to this policy, there were also protests made by students in 1993 and 1999 contesting the dress code policy of the school. In 1993, over 150 students were suspended due to their participation in a marching protest. Their true intentions were to publish the fact that all pieces of clothing were going to be made in other countries, therefore forcing over a thousand students to participate in a transaction with other countries, which was not to the advantage of the province of Quebec at the time. All clothing ended up being made in Mexico, Thailand and other foreign countries.

== Programs ==
=== Micro-Computer Program ===
The school also has a special computer program for skilled students, called "Programme Micro-Informatique"; English: Micro-Computer Program. This is often referred to as « pme » in French. Many projects in all courses on this program require the usage of the computer and an admission test is required as well as grades from elementary school to obtain a spot for this program.

=== Individual Learning Programs ===
There is also a program for students having behavioral or learning difficulties. The program is called Cheminement Particulier Continu (Continuous Individual Advancement) in which students learn in a different way, conducting various types of activities in addition to their regular one. There was also the Cheminement Particulier Temporaire (Temporary Individual Advancement) which was heavily used before the students were sent to regular and larger groups.

== Junior football team ==
The school is also home to a Juvénile AA (junior) football team called the Jaguars who were Division II provincial champions in 2004. In 2007, the team won the Outaouais Division I championship but lost to the J-H Leclerc Incroyables (Granby) in the provincial final. web site : [www.jags.ca.cx]
