= École secondaire du Versant =

Location
- 808, boulevard de la Cité; Gatineau, Quebec, J8R 3S8; Canada; 45.4935°N 75.6815°W

Information
- School type: High school
- Founded: 2002
- School board: Commission Scolaire des Draveurs
- Principal: Myriam Paradis
- Grades: Secondary 1–5
- Enrollment: about 1200 students
- Language: French
- Website: www.csdraveurs.qc.ca/versant/index.htm

École secondaire du Versant (English: du Versant Secondary School) is a public secondary school located in Gatineau, Quebec. It is located on Boulevard de la Cité at the corner of Boulevard La Verendrye in the Gatineau sector and is operated by the Commission Scolaire des Draveurs school board.

The school is the most recent Francophone high school built in the city. The move was to reduce over-population at other Gatineau sector schools, particularly at the Polyvalente Le Carrefour located a few minutes south and Polyvalente Nicolas-Gatineau located a few minutes to the east. The school board chose large vacant land currently under development near the Gatineau Hospital to build the new high school and opened on November 12, 2002, with initially 825 students. Initially, students from du Versant started the 2002–2003 school year at the Polyvalente Nicolas-Gatineau before moving to their new location. The current student enrollment is approximately 1,200 students and the school has a capacity of about 1,500 students.

== Logo and name designation ==
The name of the school was chosen following a contest involving the population within the Commission Scolaire des Draveurs jurisdiction territory (the Gatineau sector) in which they suggested different names for the new school. The suggestion "du Versant" from a Polyvalente Nicolas-Gatineau Secondary 4 student was chosen for geographical reasons as the school's location on a steep cliff gives a great view of most of the city of Gatineau and Ottawa just across the Ottawa River.

The school's logo was designed by a computer graphics student at the Centre Competences-Outaouais, a vocational school in Gatineau.

== Information ==
- The Le Transit program is a measure helping students with formation and academic problems.
- Santé Plein Air and Arts de la Rue are two concentration programs for high-skilled students.
- Due to the proximity of the school to a large artery, there were safety concerns due to the high speed limit of 70 km/H. It was reduced to 50 km/H, with school signs and traffic lights added eight months after its opening. Temporary lights were installed for a certain period
- Each December, there is an annual dinner organized by the city's media community including members of CHOT-DT television station. Proceeds from the event go to local charities across the Outaouais region.
- Each April, the school organizes a homelessness night in which students build cardboard houses to sleep outside for one night to increase awareness of poverty and homelessness.
