= Collège Saint-Alexandre de la Gatineau =

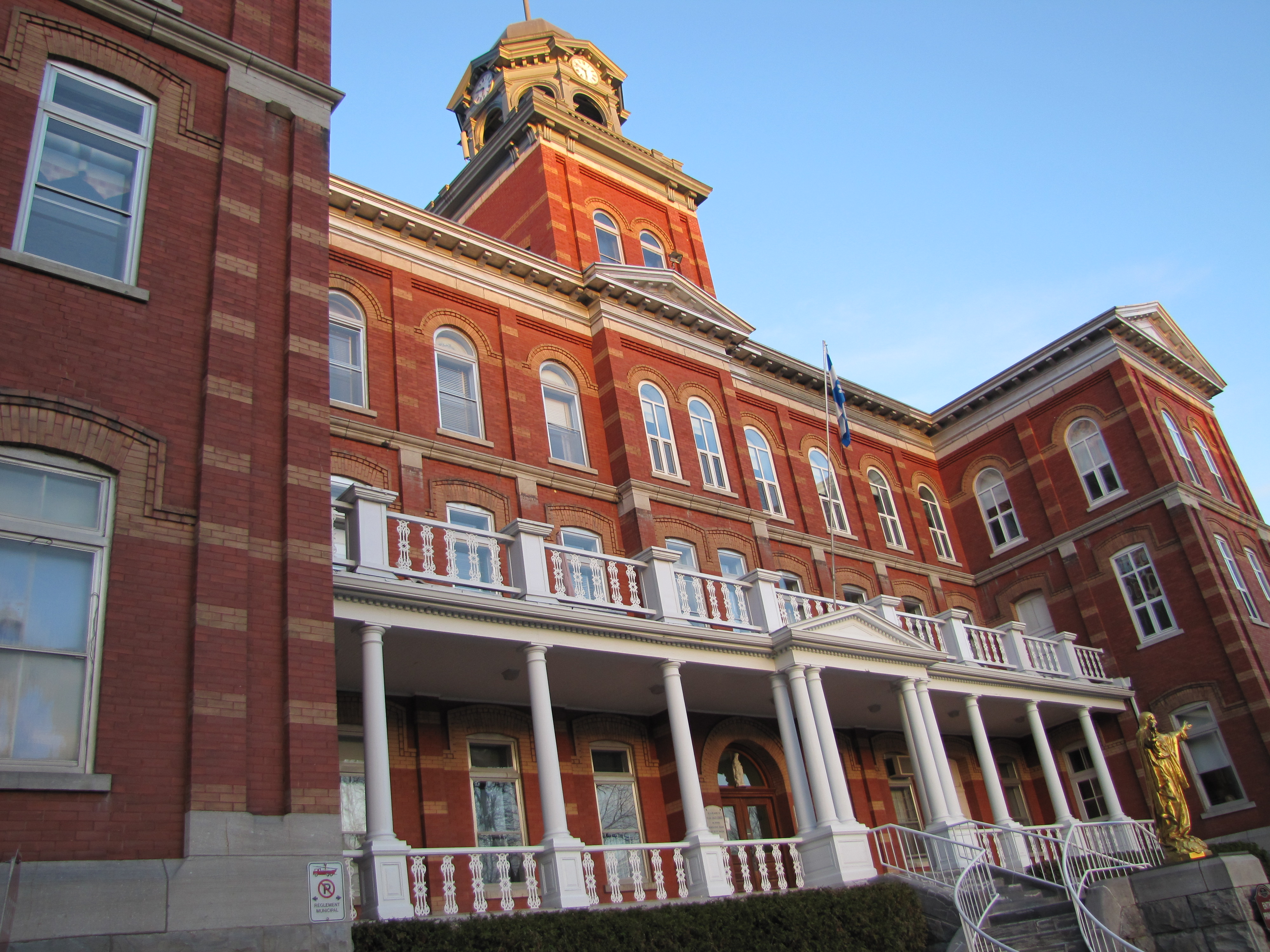
- Collège Saint-Alexandre de la Gatineau as viewed from outside

Location
- 2425, rue Saint-Louis; Gatineau, Quebec, J8V 1E7; Canada; 45°29′35″N 75°45′0″W

Information
- School type: High school
- Founded: 1912; 114 years ago
- General Manager: Mario Vachon
- Grades: Secondary 1–5 since 1965
- Language: French
- Website: www.st-alex.ca

Collège Saint-Alexandre de la Gatineau is a private secondary school (high school) located in Gatineau, in the Outaouais region, in the province of Quebec, Canada. It is located on Rue Saint-Louis in the Limbour neighbourhood of Gatineau. Founded in 1905 by the Communauté des pères du Saint-Esprit, the Collège is an establishment for boys and girls offering a general education program for young people in French, leading to a high school diploma.

Once exclusive for boys, it became an inclusive (boys and girls) institution in 1990. Known for its solid reputation of superior education, ranking in the top 15 of all high schools in Québec, it attracts students from all over the region, particularly from the towns of Ottawa, Hull, Gatineau, Cantley, Chelsea, Aylmer, Buckingham and Masson-Angers. The school's motto is Vitam Impedere Vero, which comes from the Latin poet Juvenal. It means, "To devote one's life to the truth."

The land used for the school was bought by Alonzo Wright, a Canadian politician.

== History ==
The building in which the school is housed was built in 1850 by Alonzo Wright. It was at first used as a manor for parties. Wright died in 1894. After the death of his wife in 1904, the property was bought by Jesuit priests fleeing secularization in France. They sought to turn the building into a private institution where they would teach classical studies, including philosophy, Greek, and Latin.

In 1912, it would become the Collège Saint-Alexandre, founded by the Congregation of the Holy Spirit. In 1965, the classical courses were abolished after extensive reforms by the Quebec government during the Quiet Revolution, in which the province acquired a large role in the education jurisdiction. Priests have gradually stopped teaching, and today the institution is as secular as public schools. In 1988–89, the first female students were admitted to the College; the first group finished secondary level in 1993.

In 2004, students, who already had a strict clothing policy, started wearing a uniform.

== Books ==
- Gay, Paul Cahiers Lestage: Breve Histoire du College Saint-Alexandre (Gatineau, Collège Saint-Alexandre) Call Number 365.L.01.7
- Gobeil, Maurice Cahiers Lestage: Le 'Roi de la Gatineau' et le college Saint-Alexandre (Gatineau, Collège Saint-Alexandre) Call Number 365.L.01.4
- Larose, Marie-Anne Cahiers Lestage: Les Soeurs des Sacres-Coeurs Au College Saint-Alexandre (Gatineau, Collège Saint-Alexandre) Call Number 365.L.01.12
