= École polyvalente Nicolas-Gatineau =

École Polyvalente Nicolas-Gatineau

Location
- 360 Bd la Vérendrye E Gatineau, Québec, J8P 6K7; Canada; 45.4992°N 75.6454°W

Information
- Other names: EPNG
- School type: Secondary school
- Established: c.1971
- School board: City of Gatineau
- Principal: Valérie Carrier
- Grades: Secondary 1-5
- Enrollment: 3000
- Language: French
- Website: https://nicolas-gatineau.cssd.gouv.qc.ca

École polyvalente Nicolas-Gatineau is a public secondary school located in Gatineau, Quebec. The school is located at the corner of Boulevards Labrosse and La Vérendrye in the city's east end. It is run by the Centre de service scolaire des Draveurs school board in Gatineau. The Nicolas-Gatineau school is the largest in the city of Gatineau and the second largest in Quebec, enrolling about 3,000 students every year from Secondary 1 to 5.

== Concentration programs ==
The school offers number of concentrated programs in several domains including music, dramatic art, sports, dance, math sciences, etc. These programs are only offered to students who performed above average at the primary level and only a maximum of 32 students are admitted to a particular concentration program.

The school also offers a Quebec-recognized Sport-Études (Sport Studies) program, which allows student athletes to pursue sports competitively at a provincial, national, or international level.

== History ==
https://nicolas-gatineau.cssd.gouv.qc.ca/ecole/historique
