= Neighbourhoods of Gatineau =

List of neighbourhoods in the City of Gatineau, Quebec, Canada.

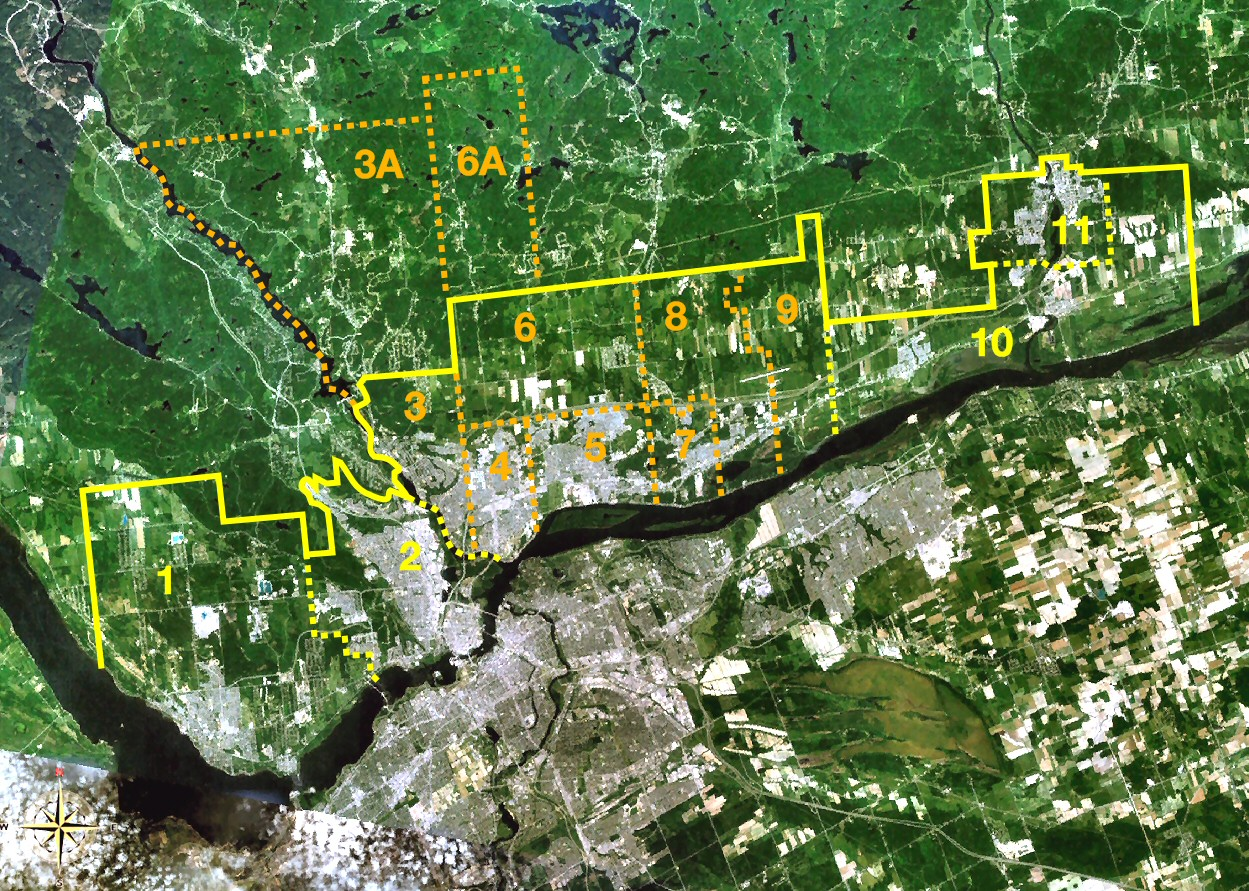
Satellite image of Gatineau with current and former boundaries, also showing its sectors.

== Aylmer Sector ==
- Centre-Ville (Downtown) Aylmer
- Champlain Park
- Deschênes
- Glenwood
- Lakeview Terrace
- Le Plateau (adjacent to Hull Sector)
- Les Cedres
- Lucerne Nord
- Manoir Champlain/Rivermead
- McLeod/Eardley/Lakeview Terrace
- Parc Aylmer
- Pilon
- Queen's Park
- Seigneurie Lavigne/Jardins Lavigne
- Vieux Moulin
- Wychwood/Des Pionniers

== Hull Sector ==
- Des Hautes-Plaines
- Manoir des Trembles
- Lac des Fées (Wrightville)
- Le Plateau (adjacent to Aylmer sector)
- Mont-Bleu
- Parc de la Montagne
- Richelieu Industrial Park
- Saint-Jean-Bosco (Wrightville)
- Saint-Raymond (Parc de la Montagne)
- Val-Tétreau
- Jardins Taché (Val-Tétreau)
- Vieux-Hull/Downtown (Île de Hull)
- Wrightville

== Gatineau sector ==
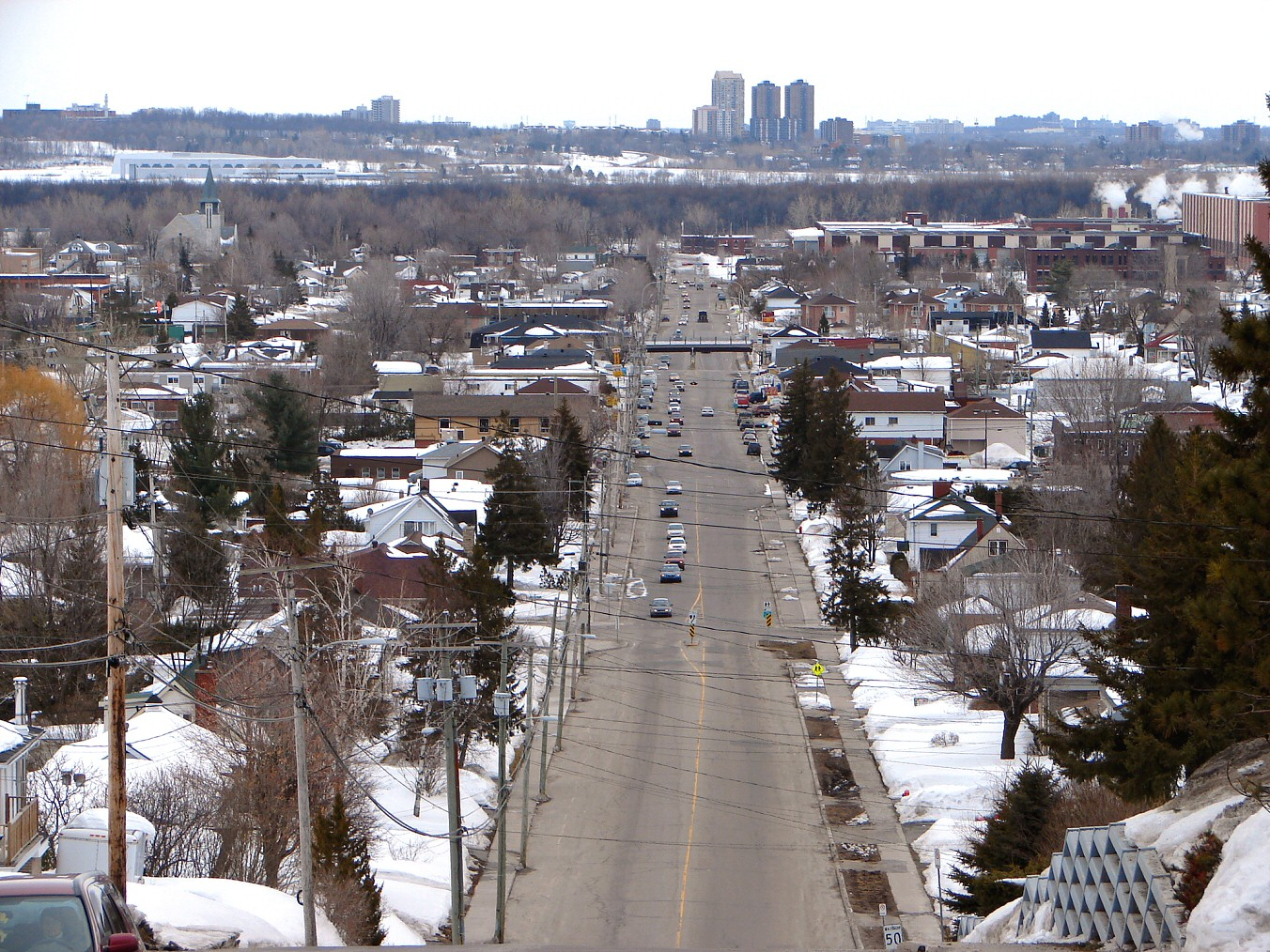
Main Street in the original town of Gatineau.

- Achbar
- Baie McLaurin
- Bellevue/Davidson
- Centre-Ville (downtown) Gatineau
- Coteville
- De la Sablonnière/Cheval Blanc
- De l'Hôpital
- Des Érables
- Du Ruisseau
- La Baie
- Le Baron
- Le Carrefour
- Les Hauteurs
- Les Pins
- Le Versant
- Limbour/Côte d'Azur
- Lorrain
- McLaren
- Mont-Luc
- Mont-Royal/Côte des Neiges
- Notre-Dame/Saint-Jean Marie Vianney
- Paiement
- Pointe-Gatineau
- Riviera/Touraine
- Sainte-Rose
- Saint-René
- Saint-Richard
- Tecumseh
- Terrasses-Paiement/Ravins-Boises
- Touraine

== Masson-Angers sector ==
- Angers
- Masson

== Buckingham sector ==
- Buckingham East
- Buckingham West
