= Sainte-Rose-de-Lima Church, Gatineau =

Catholic church in Gatineau, Quebec

Sainte-Rose-de-Lima Church
- Église Sainte-Rose-de-Lima
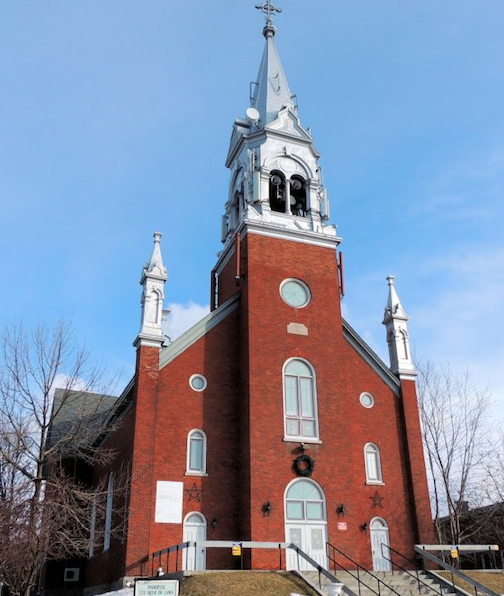
- Façade of Sainte-Rose-de-Lima Church
- Interactive map of Sainte-Rose-de-Lima Church
- Location: 861 Saint-René Boulevard East, Gatineau, Quebec, Canada
- Coordinates: 45.4988°N 75.6078°W
- Type: Church
- Material: Red brick, asphalt shingle roof, plaster interior
- Beginning date: 1913
- Completion date: 1915
- Dedicated to: Saint Rose of Lima
- Religious affiliation: Roman Catholic

Sainte-Rose-de-Lima Church is a Catholic religious building located in the Templeton neighborhood of Gatineau, Quebec, Canada. It is the oldest surviving church in Gatineau, reflecting the region's early Catholic heritage.

== History and architecture ==
The parish of Sainte-Rose-de-Lima was established in 1898, with registers opening on January 6, 1890, following a period of mission status from 1889 to 1896. Construction of the current church began in 1913 and was completed in 1915. It is named in honour of Saint Rose of Lima (1586–1617), the first saint of the New World. An earlier wooden church, built in 1889 on land donated by M. Hurtubise, stood across from the current site on Perkins Road (now Boulevard Lorrain).

The church features a Latin cross floor plan with a single-aisle nave. Constructed with red brick exterior, it has an asphalt shingle roof and a plaster interior. The architectural design reflects the Beaux-Arts style, characterized by its symmetrical composition and classical detailing, complemented by Neo-Renaissance ornamentation, such as decorative cornices and pilasters. Following the Second Vatican Council (1962–1965), the interior underwent modifications, including the simplification of the altar and removal of some decorative elements, to align with liturgical reforms emphasizing congregational participation.

== Heritage value ==
The church is recognized as part of Quebec's cultural heritage, listed in the Répertoire du patrimoine culturel du Québec. In 2003, the Conseil du patrimoine religieux du Québec assigned Sainte-Rose-de-Lima Church a "moderate" (D) heritage value compared to other places of worship in the Outaouais region, based on its architectural and historical significance. Its role as a community landmark in Templeton and its connection to early 20th-century Catholic life in Gatineau contribute to its cultural importance.

As a Catholic place of worship, it is part of the Saint-Antoine Sainte-Rose pastoral unit and is affiliated with the Archdiocese of Gatineau.

== Gallery ==
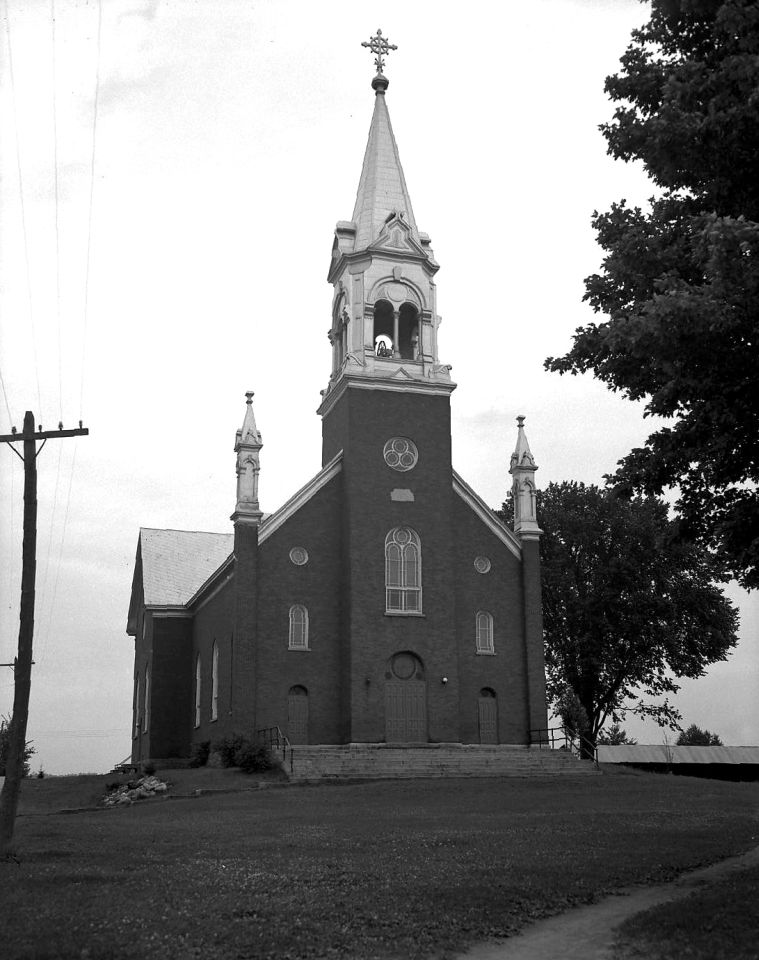
The church in 1947, photographed by Champlain Marcil.

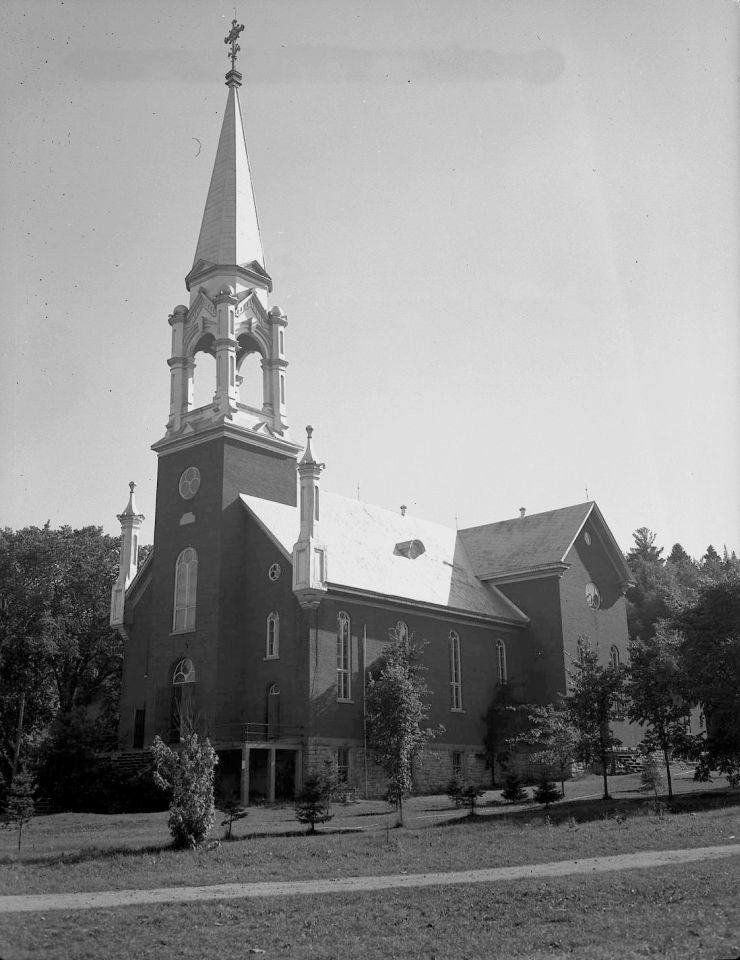
The church in 1947, photographed by Champlain Marcil.

== See also ==
- Roman Catholic Archdiocese of Gatineau
- Saint Rose of Lima
- Beaux-Arts architecture
- Renaissance Revival architecture
- Cultural heritage of Quebec
