= Monastery of Saint Rose of Lima =

Monastery in Lima, Peru

- Monasterio de Santa Rosa de Lima
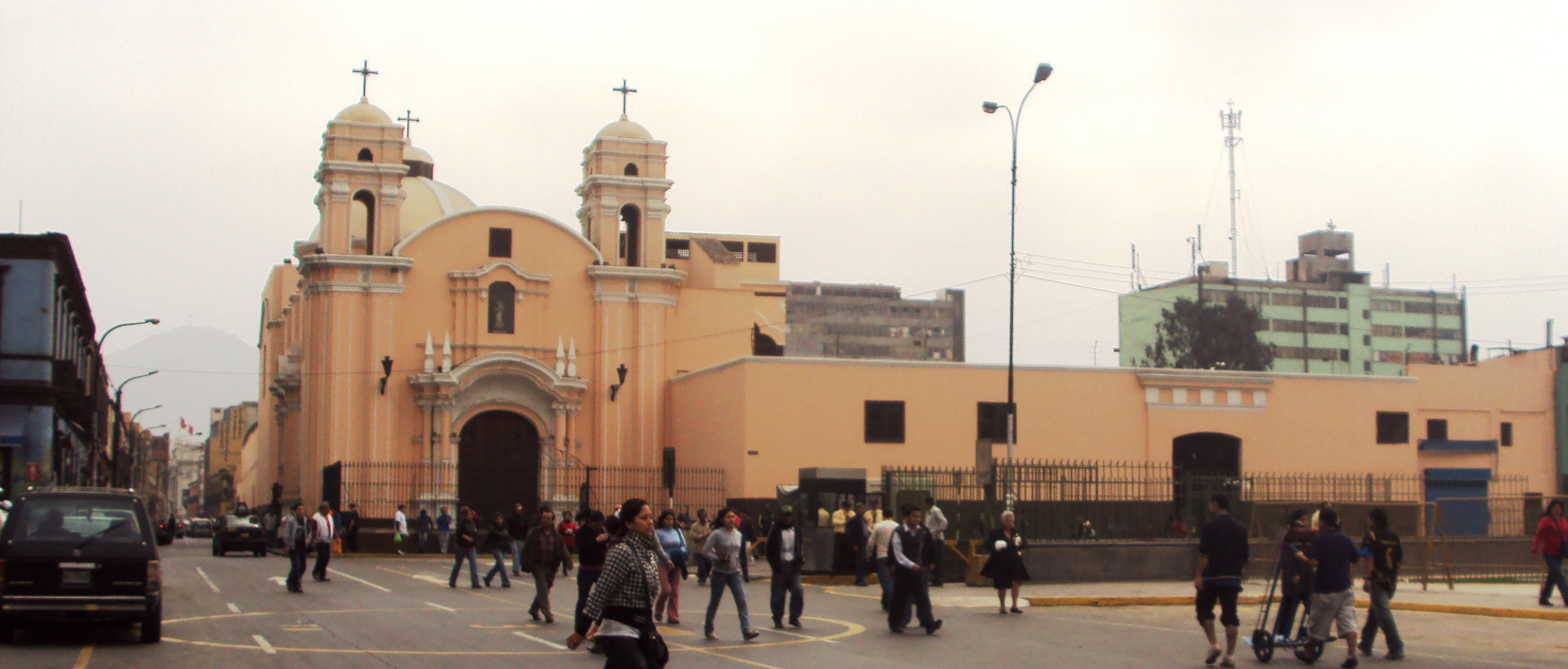
- Interactive map of Monastery of Saint Rose of Lima

Monastery information
- Order: Dominican
- Denomination: Catholic
- Archdiocese: Archdiocese of Lima

Architecture
- Heritage designation: Cultural heritage of the Nation
- Designated date: 1972
- Style: Spanish Colonial

Site
- Location: Lima
- Country: Peru
- Coordinates: 12.0512°S 77.0271°W

The Monastery of Saint Rose of Lima (Spanish: Monasterio de Santa Rosa de Lima, Monasterio de Santa Rosa de Santa María or Santa Rosa de las Monjas) is a Catholic monastery dedicated to Saint Rose of Lima (born Isabel Flores de Oliva) located at the intersection of Santa Rosa and Ayacucho (formerly Urubamba) streets, next to the Plaza Gastañeta in the historic centre of Lima, Peru.

It is made up of the Church and the Monastery, it was built in the 17th and 18th centuries, next to the house in which Saint Rose of Lima lived and spent the last three months of her life until her death in her room on August 24, 1617. Said room has since been converted into a chapel.

== See also ==
- Saint Rose of Lima
- Historic Centre of Lima
- Dominican Order
- Sanctuary of Saint Rose of Lima
