= Sanctuary of Saint Rose of Lima =

Church building and convent in Lima, Peru

- Santuario de Santa Rosa de Lima
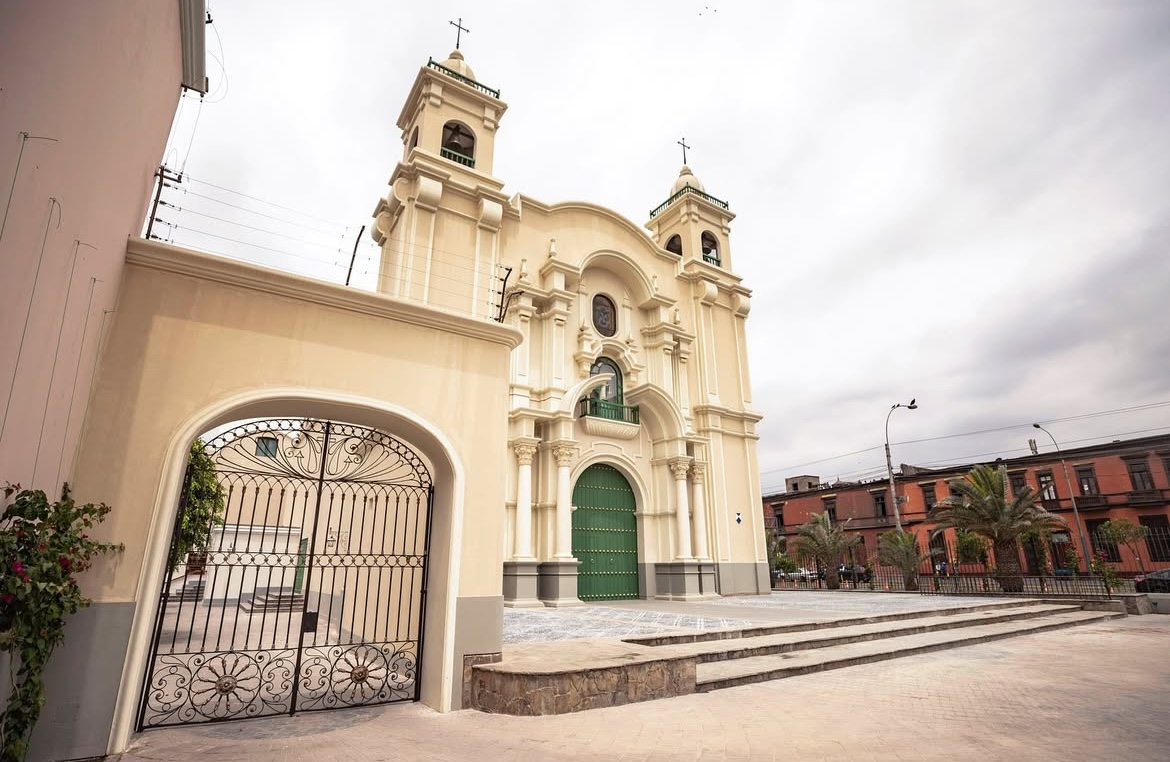
- Interactive map of Sanctuary of Saint Rose of Lima

Monastery information
- Order: Dominican
- Denomination: Catholic
- Established: 1728
- Archdiocese: Archdiocese of Lima

Architecture
- Heritage designation: Cultural heritage of the Nation
- Designated date: 1972
- Style: Spanish Colonial

Site
- Location: Lima
- Country: Peru
- Coordinates: 12.0426°S 77.0353°W

The Sanctuary of Saint Rose of Lima (Spanish: Santuario de Santa Rosa de Lima), also known as Santa Rosa de los Padres, is a sanctuary dedicated to Saint Rose of Lima (born Isabel Flores de Oliva). It is located in the remains of Oliva's house, including the well used by the family, which serves as a highlight of the convent among visitors.

Because it was the residence of Rose of Lima and her family, it is also the location of the miracles attributed to her.

== History ==
The sanctuary was inaugurated on August 24, 1992, after being remodeled. It also features a painting of the Saint carried by Miguel Grau among the Huáscar.

The Hospital del Espíritu Santo, a hospital once located within the sanctuary's grounds, was excavated and its entrance's remains re-inaugurated in a ceremony organised by PROLIMA on August 25, 2026.

== Gallery ==
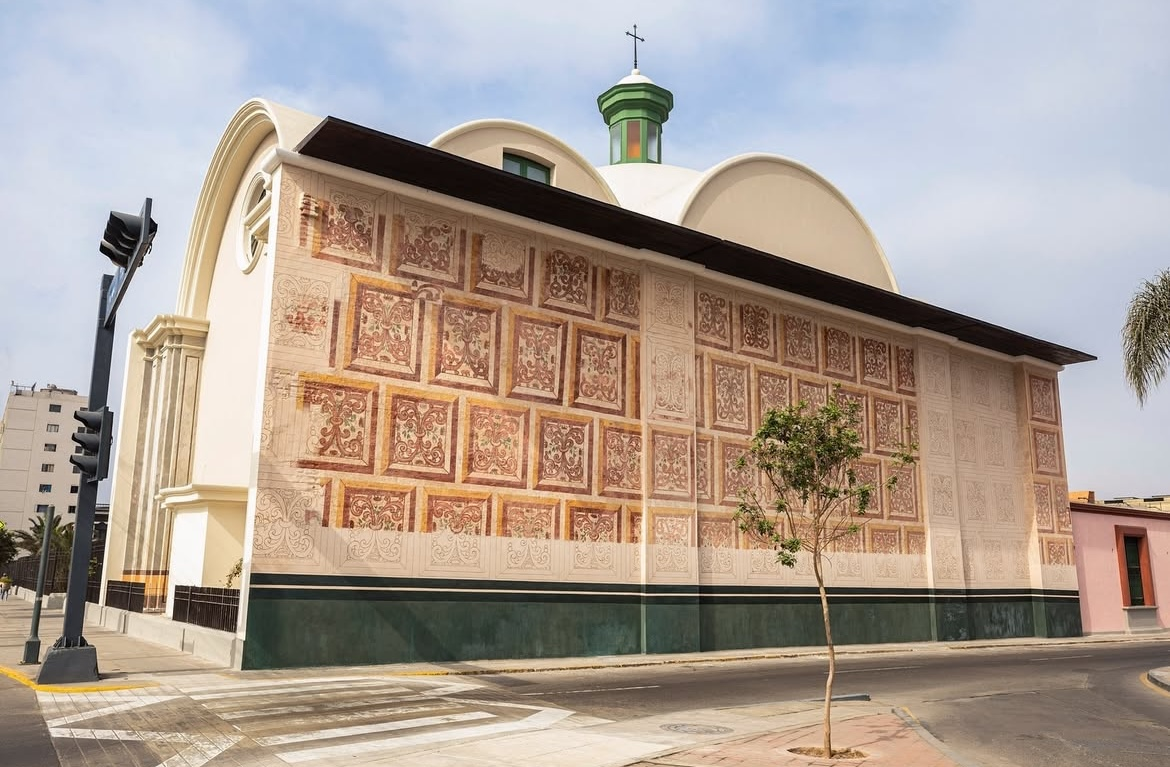
Side view of the Sanctuary

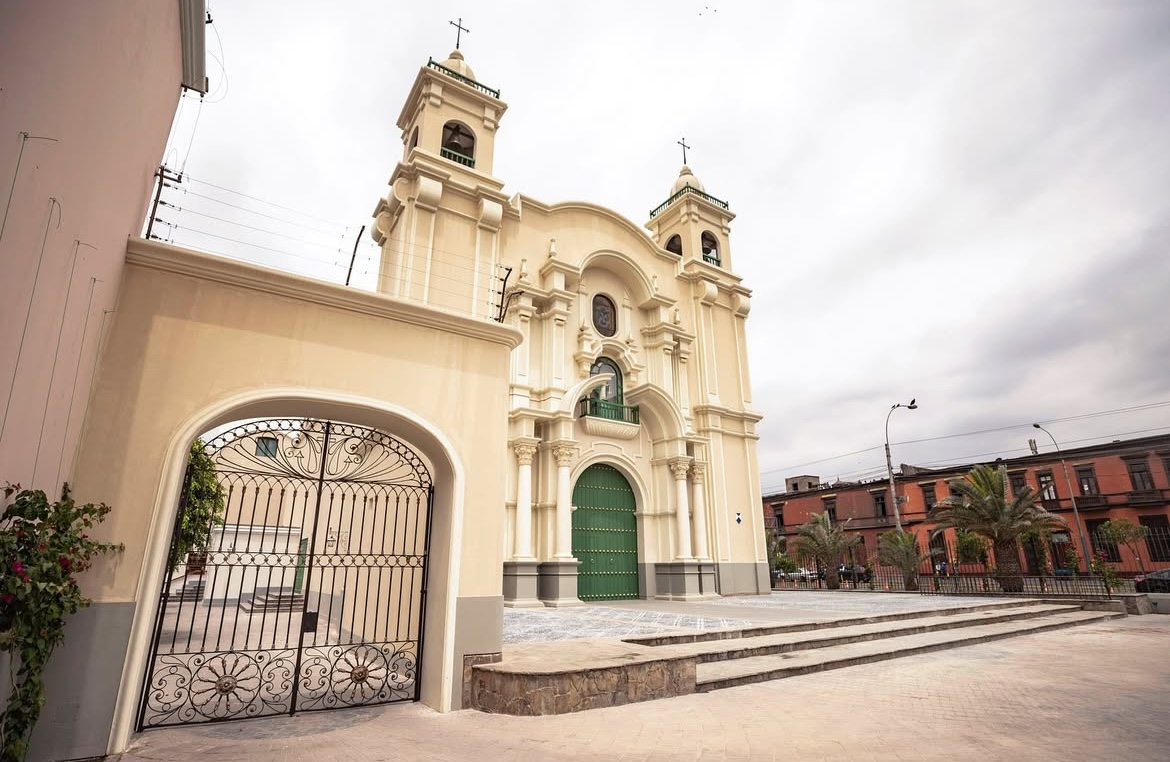
Front view of the Sanctuary

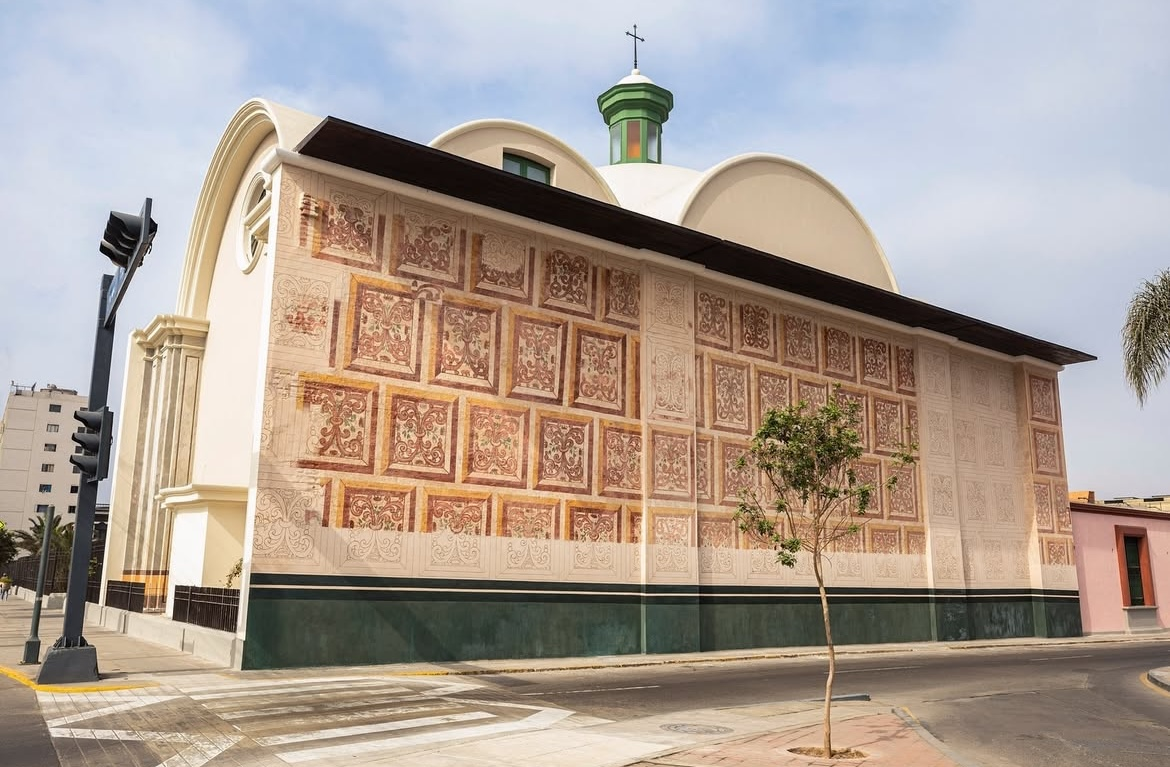
Side view of one of the Sanctuary's walls

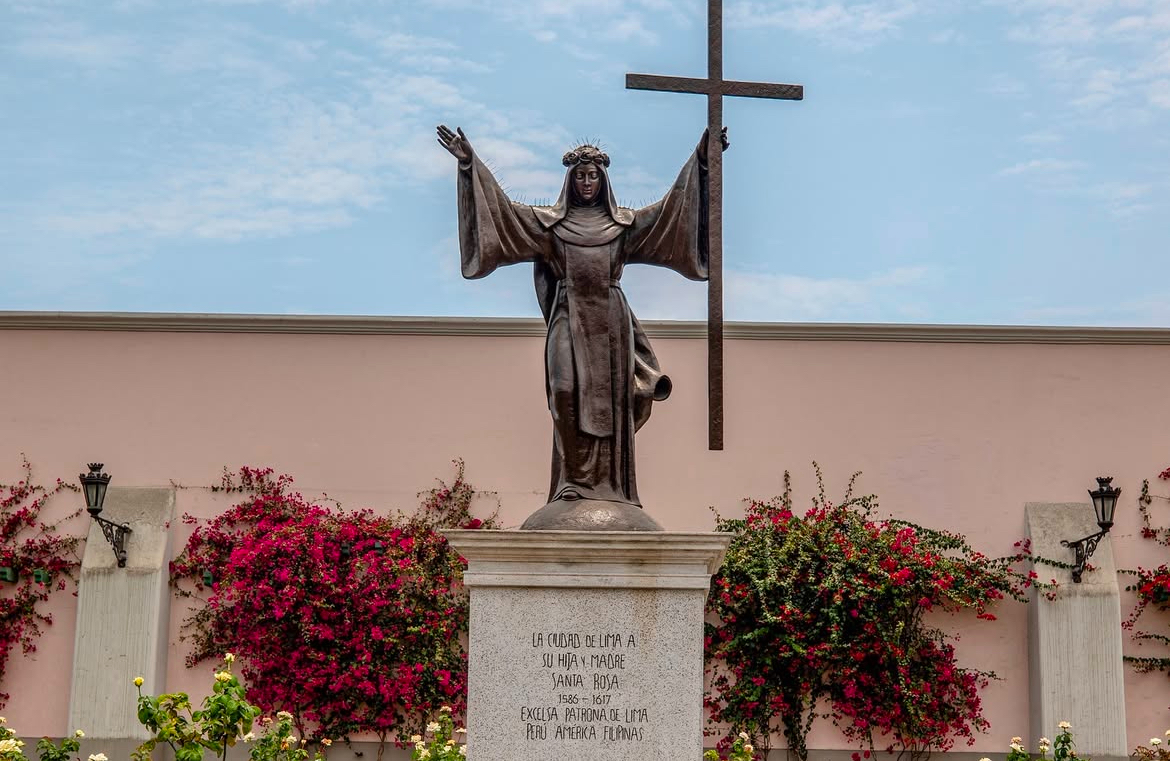
Statue of Rose of Lima inside the Sanctuary

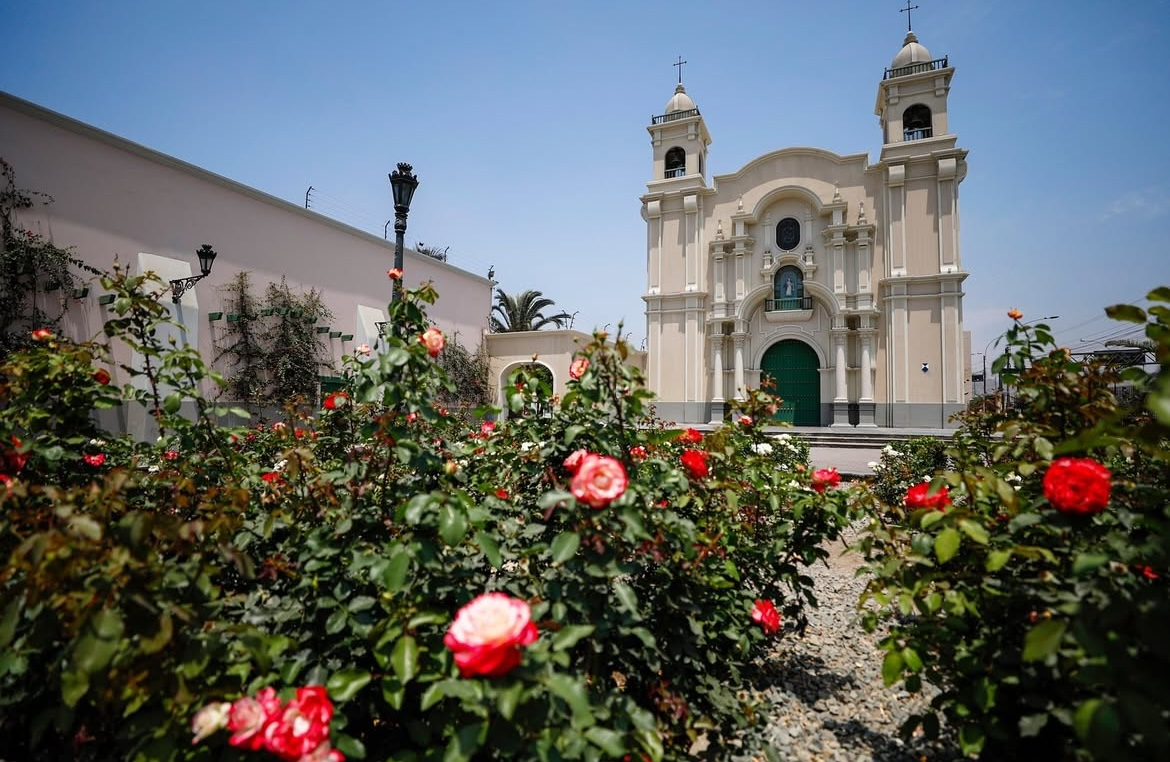
View of the rose garden in front of the Sanctuary

== See also ==
- Rose of Lima
- Historic Centre of Lima
- Dominican Order
- Monastery of Saint Rose of Lima
