= Champlain Marcil =

French Canadian photojournalist

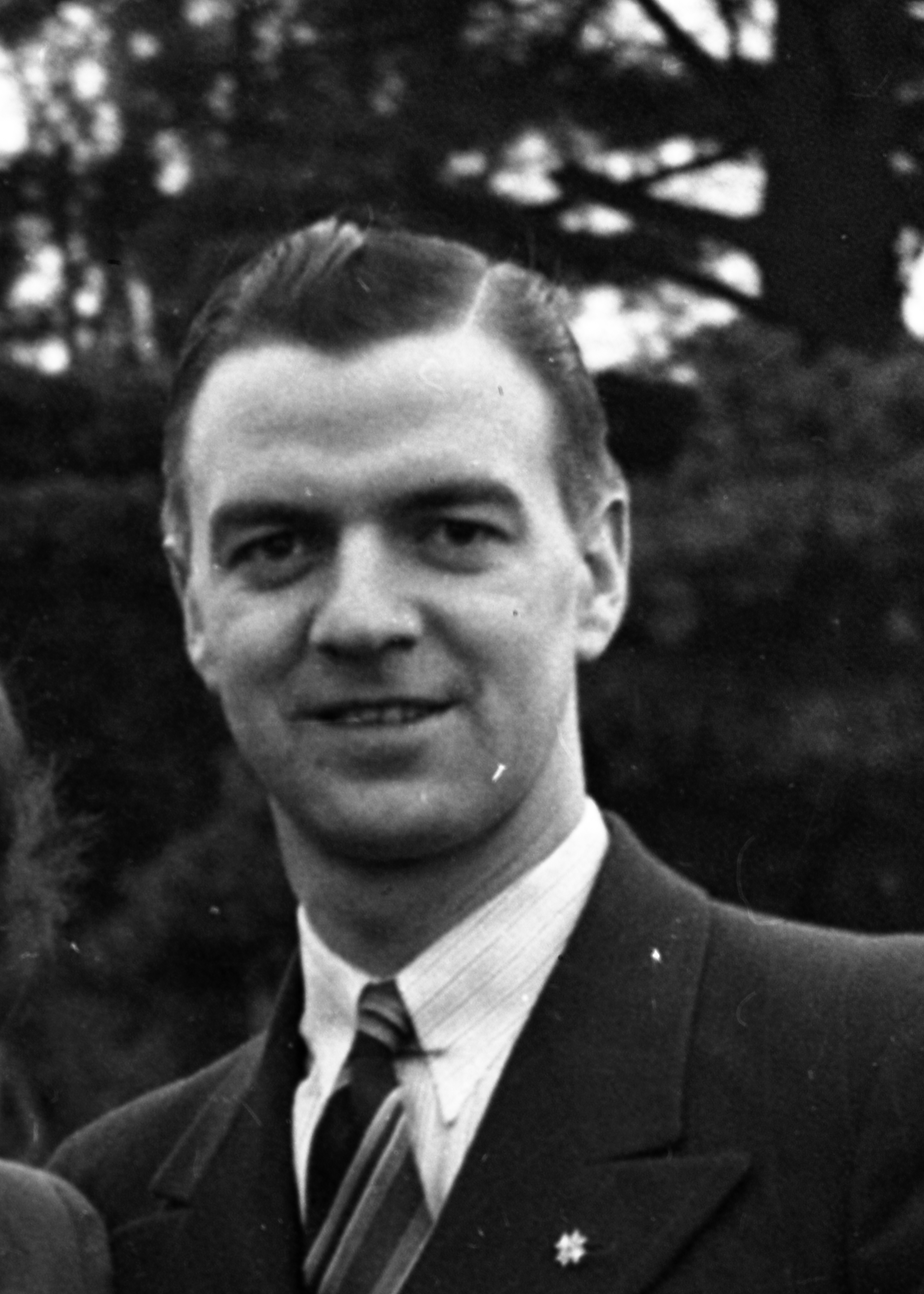
Champlain Marcil in 1945

Champlain Marcil (1920–2010) was a French Canadian photojournalist best known for being the photographer of the daily newspaper Le Droit from 1948 to 1969. In addition, he was active from 1940 to 1985 in depicting the Outaouais region of western Quebec and Ontario.

== Personal life ==
Marcil was born in Ottawa in June 1920 to Rose-Alba Carle and Roméo R. Marcil. He was one of nine children. Marcil married Pauline Vachon in 1947, and they had five children. He died in 2010 and is interred in Notre-Dame Cemetery in Ottawa. He was a life member of the University of Ottawa, and a member of various Christian organizations.

== Career ==
He began his career as a professional photographer in 1940, recording the Eucharistic Congress at Trois-Rivières. In 1947, he shot the Ottawa Marian Congress and became a freelancer for Le Droit, becoming a permanent contributor from 1954 to 1969. At the same time, he was class photographer for 125 schools in the Hawkesbury - Ottawa area.

The Champlain Marcil archives contains 135,425 photographs and is preserved in the Bibliothèque et Archives nationales du Québec (National Library and Archives of Québec) in Gatineau.
