= Rose of Lima =

Peruvian saint (1586–1617)

Saint Rose of Lima TOSD
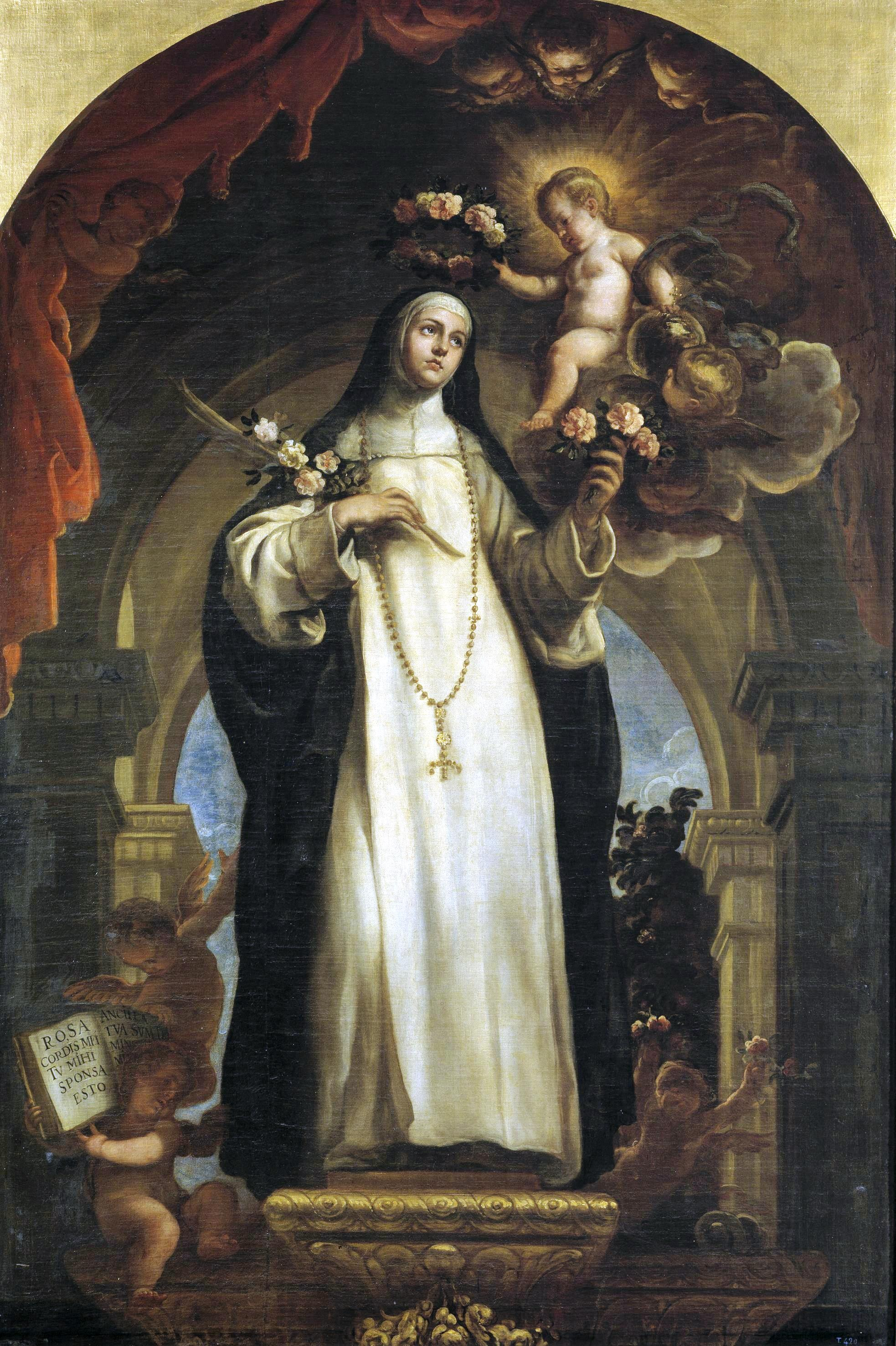
- Saint Rose of Lima by Claudio Coello (1642–1693), in the Prado Museum, Madrid, Spain

Virgin
- Born: Isabel Flores de Oliva; 20 April 1586; Lima, Viceroyalty of Peru, Spanish Empire
- Died: 24 August 1617 (aged 31); Lima, Viceroyalty of Peru, Spanish Empire
- Venerated in: Catholic Church
- Beatified: 15 April 1667 or 1668, Rome, Papal States by Pope Clement IX
- Canonized: 12 April 1671, Rome, Papal States by Pope Clement X
- Major shrine: Basilica of Santo Domingo; Lima, Peru
- Feast: 23 August; 30 August (some Latin American countries and pre-1970 General Roman Calendar)
- Attributes: Dominican tertiaries' habit, roses, anchor, Infant Jesus
- Patronage: embroiderers; sewing lace; gardeners; florists; people ridiculed or misunderstood for their piety; for the resolution of family quarrels; against vanity; indigenous peoples of the Americas; Latin America; Peru; Philippines; the Indies; Villareal; Santa Rosa, California; Santa Rosa, Laguna; Santa Rosa, Nueva Ecija; Alcoy, Cebu; Daanbantayan, Cebu; Cabangan, Zambales; Arima, Trinidad and Tobago; Lima; Sittard

Rose of Lima (born Isabel Flores de Oliva; 20 April 1586 – 24 August 1617) (Latin: Rosa Limana, Spanish: Rosa de Lima), was a member of the Third Order of Saint Dominic in Lima, Peru, Spanish Empire, who became known for both her life of severe penance and her care of the poverty stricken of the city through her own private efforts.

Rose of Lima was born to a noble family and is the patron saint of embroidery, gardening, and cultivation of blooming flowers. She was the first person born in the Americas to be canonized as a saint.

As a saint, Rose of Lima has been designated as a co-patroness of the Philippines, along with Pudentiana; both saints were moved to second-class patronage in September 1942 by Pope Pius XII, but Rose remains the primary patroness of Peru and of the local people of Latin America. Her image was formerly featured on the highest-denomination banknote of Peru.

== Biography ==
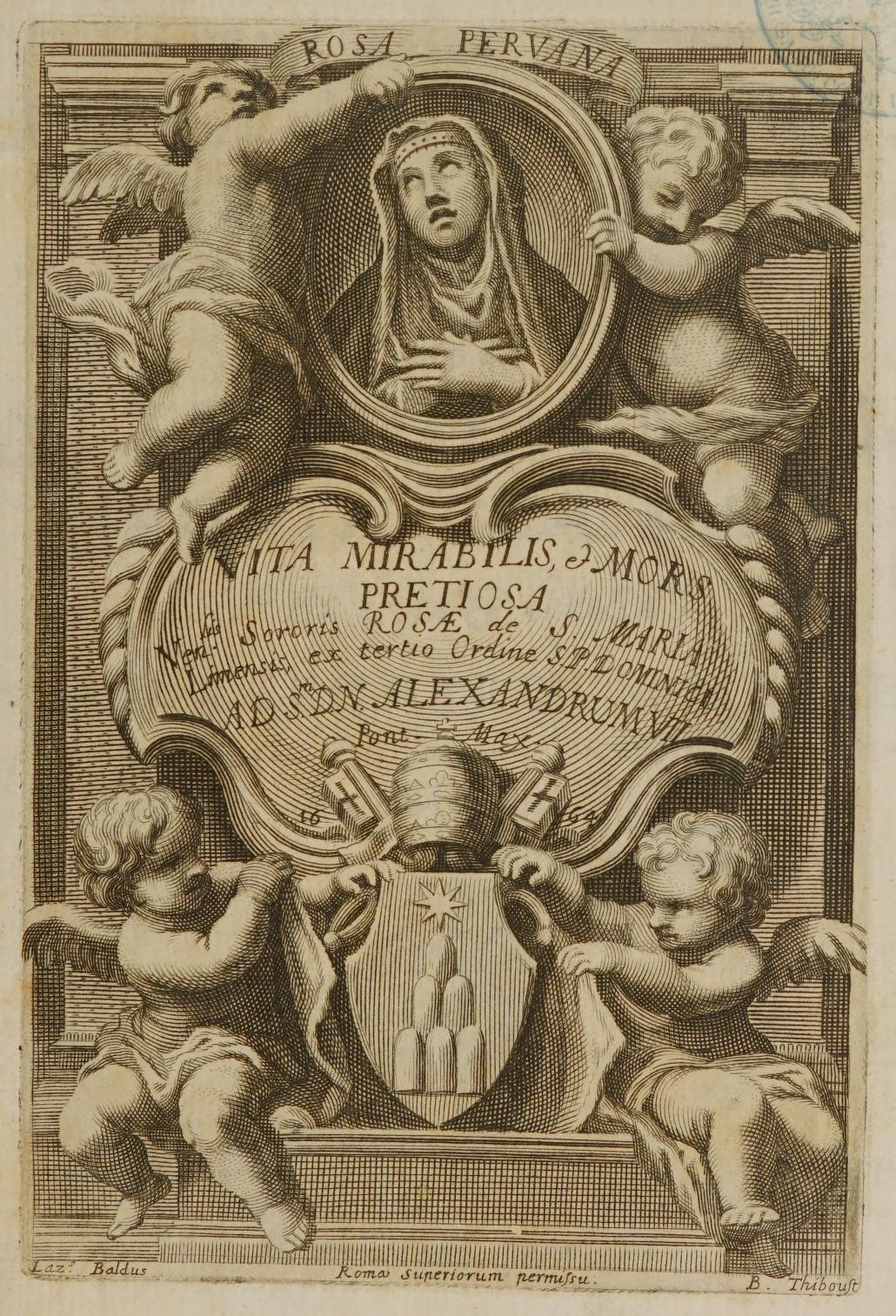
Frontispiece of Leonhard Hansen's Vita Mirabilis (Credit: Women of the Book Collection, Sheridan Libraries, Johns Hopkins University)

She was born as Isabel Flores de Oliva in the city of Lima, then in the Viceroyalty of Peru, Spanish Empire, on 20 April 1586. She was one of eleven children of Gaspar Flores, a harquebusier in the Imperial Spanish army whose family were from Baños de Montemayor, Cáceres, Spain and later travelled to Puerto Rico. His wife and Rose's mother, María de Oliva y Herrera (b. 1560), was a criolla native of Lima. Her maternal grandparents were Francisco de Oliva and Isabel de Herrera. Rose's siblings (in birth order) were Gaspar, Bernardina, Hernando, Francisco, Juana, Antonio, Andrés, Francisco and Jacinta, all born in Lima.

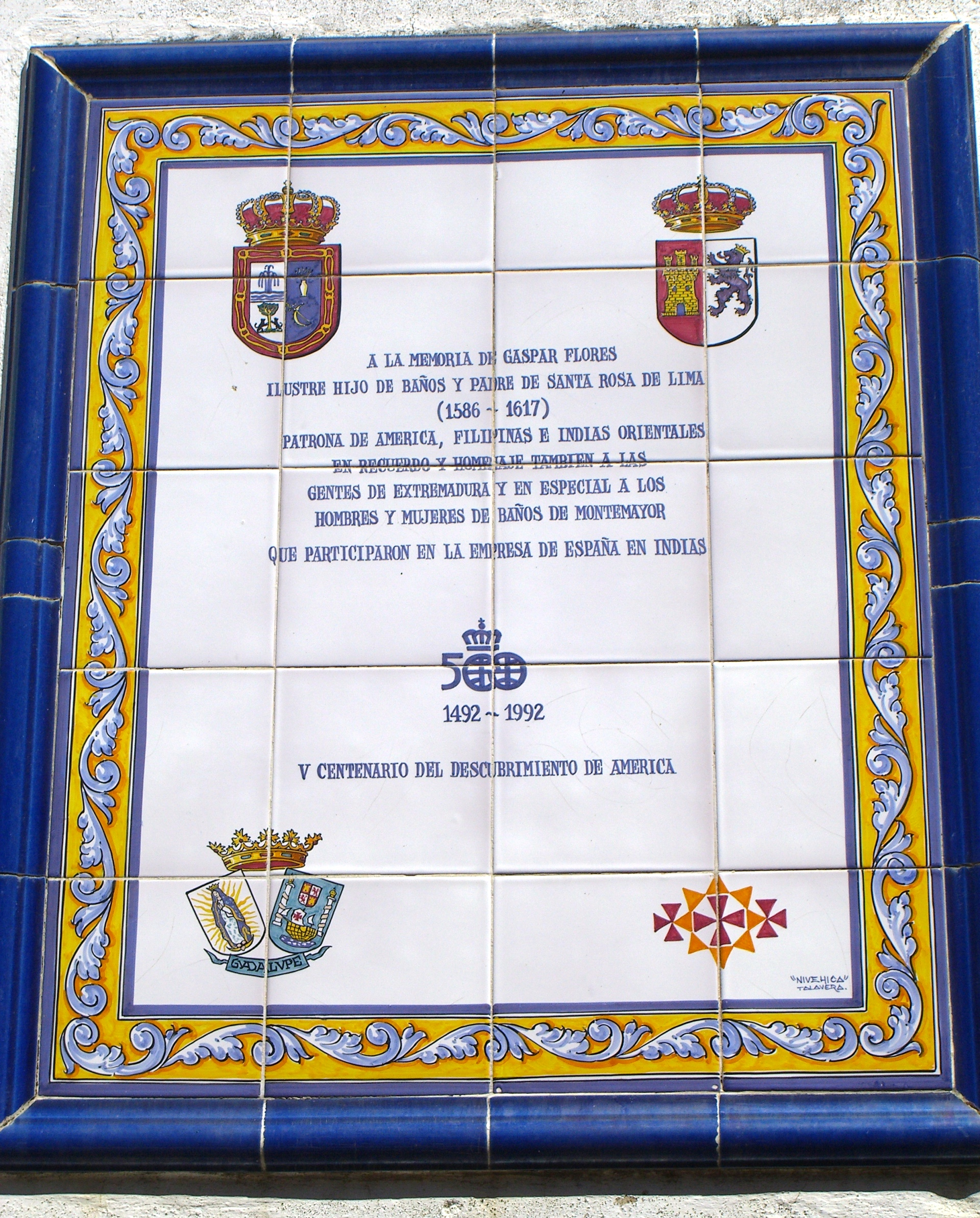
Plaque in Baños de Montemayor, Spain, dedicated to Gaspar Flores, the father of Rose of Lima

Her later nickname "Rose" comes from an incident in her infancy: a servant claimed to have seen her face transform into a rose. In 1597, Isabel was confirmed by the Archbishop of Lima, Toribio de Mogrovejo, who was also to be declared a saint. She formally took the name of Rose (Rosa in Spanish) at that time.

As a young girl, in emulation of the noted Dominican tertiary Catherine of Siena, she began to fast three times a week and performed severe penances in secret. When she was admired for her beauty, Rose cut off her hair and rubbed peppers on her face, upset that men were beginning to take notice of her. She rejected all suitors against the objections of her friends and her family. Despite the censure of her parents, she spent many hours contemplating the Blessed Sacrament, which she received daily, an extremely rare practice in that period. She was determined to take a vow of virginity, which was opposed by her parents, who wished her to marry. Finally, out of frustration, her father gave her a room to herself in the family home.

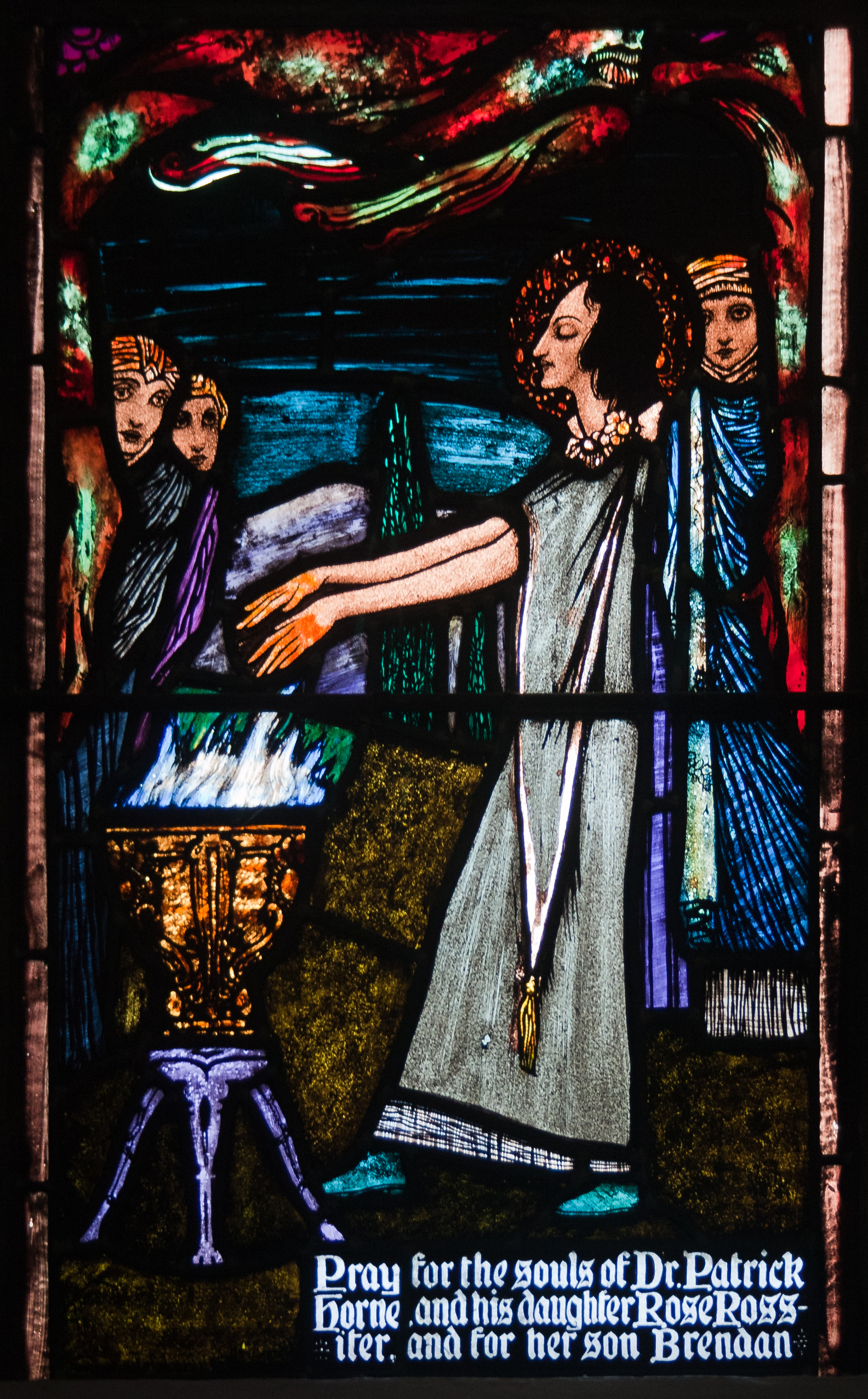
Stained glass window by Harry Clarke, located in St. Michael's Church, Ballinasloe, Ireland, depicting Saint Rose burning her hands in an act of penance

In addition to fasting, she took permanent abstinence from eating meat. She helped the sick and hungry around her community, bringing them to her room and taking care of them. Rose sold her fine needlework and took flowers that she grew to market to help her family. She made and sold lace and embroidery to care for the poor, and she prayed and did penance in a little grotto that she had built. Otherwise, she became a recluse, leaving her room only for her visits to church.

She attracted the attention of the friars of the Dominican Order. She wanted to become a nun, but her father forbade it, so she instead entered the Third Order of St. Dominic while living in her parents' home. In her twentieth year, she donned the habit of a tertiary and took a vow of perpetual virginity. She only allowed herself to sleep two hours a night at most so that she had more hours to devote to prayer. She donned a heavy crown made of silver, with small spikes on the inside, in emulation of the Crown of Thorns worn by Christ.

For eleven years, she lived this way, with intervals of ecstasy, and eventually died on 24 August 1617, at the young age of 31, after a long illness. It is said that she prophesied the date of her death. Her funeral was held in the cathedral, attended by all the public authorities of Lima. Her feast day is on the 23rd day of August (the 30th day of August in the Traditional calendar).

== Veneration ==
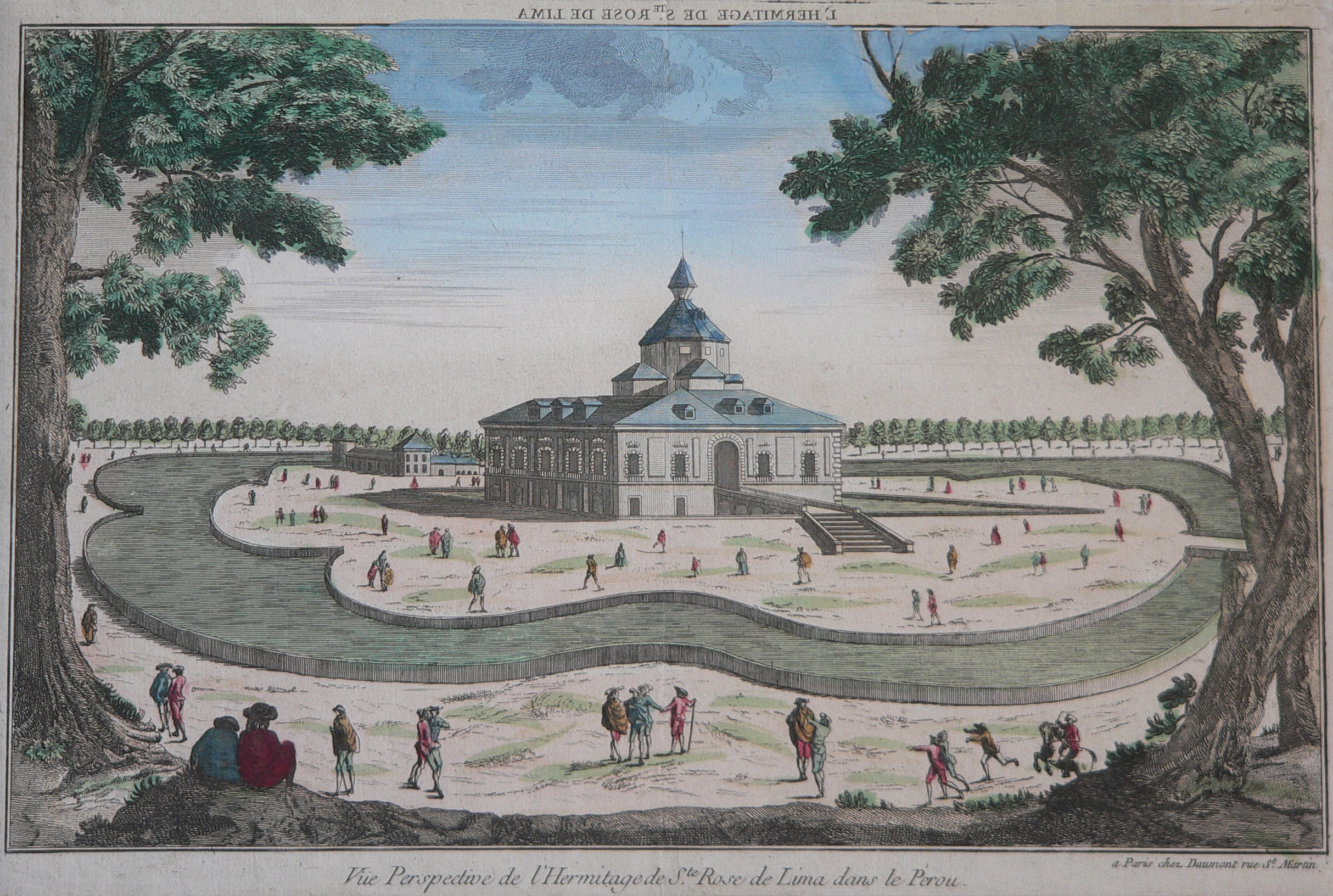
Monastery of Saint Rose in 17th-century Lima

Rose was beatified by Pope Clement IX on 10 May 1667, and canonized on 12 April 1671 by Pope Clement X, and was the first Catholic in the Americas to be declared a saint. Her shrine, alongside those of her friends Martin de Porres and John Macias, is currently located inside of the convent of Saint Dominic in Lima. The Catholic Church says that many miracles followed her death: there were stories that she had cured a leper, and that, at the time of her death, the city of Lima smelled like roses; roses also started falling from the sky. Many places in the New World are named after Santa Rosa.

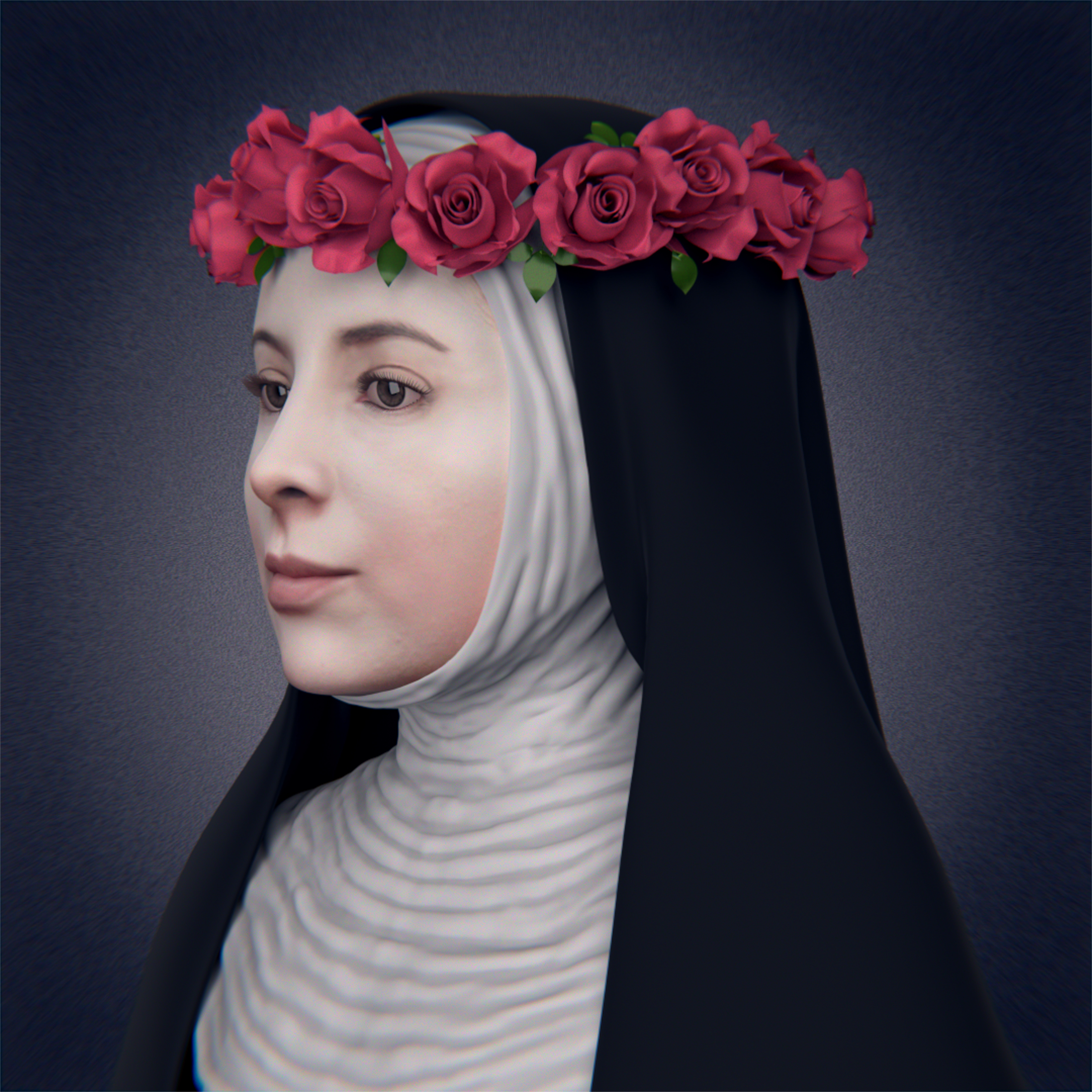
Saint Rose of Lima; facial reconstruction

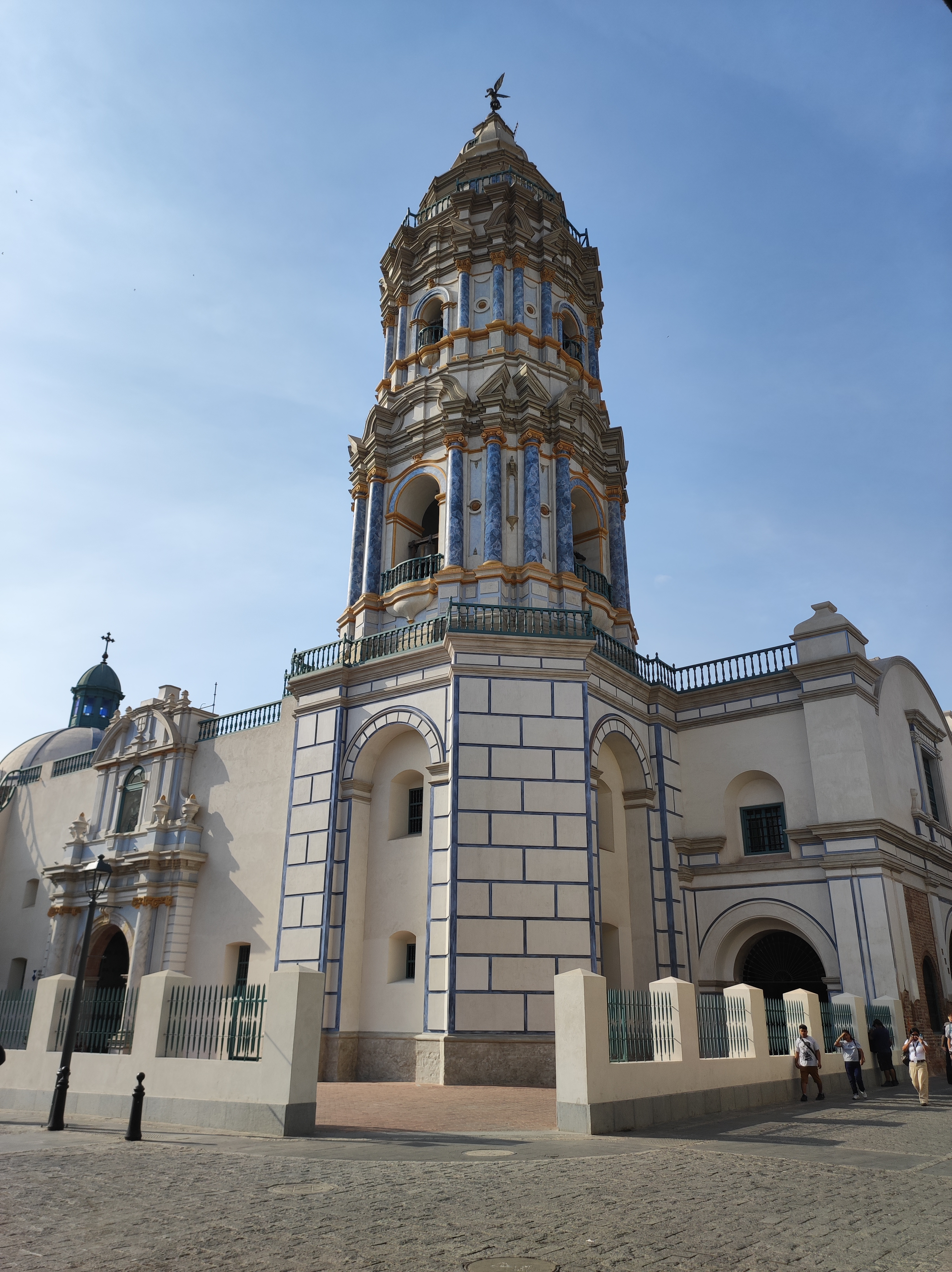
Basilica and Convent of Santo Domingo in Lima, Peru, where the remains of St. Rose of Lima rest

Her liturgical feast was inserted into the General Roman Calendar in 1729 for celebration initially on 30 August, because 24 August, the date of her death, is the feast of Saint Bartholomew the Apostle and 30 August was the closest date not already allocated to a well-known saint. Pope Paul VI's 1969 revision of the calendar made 23 August available, the day on which her feast day is now celebrated throughout the world, including Spain, but excluding Peru and some other Latin American countries, where 30 August is a public holiday in her honor.

Early lives of Rosa were written by the Dominican Father Hansen, "Vita Sanctae Rosae" (2 vols., Rome, 1664–1668), and Vicente Orsini, afterward. Pope Benedict XIII wrote "Concentus Dominicano, Bononiensis ecclesia, in album Sanctorum Ludovici Bertrandi et Rosae de Sancta Maria, ordinero praedicatorum" (Venice, 1674).

There is a park named for her in downtown Sacramento, California. A plot of land at 7th and K streets was given to the Catholic Church by Peter Burnett, first Governor of the State of California. Father Peter Anderson built one of the first of two churches in the diocese to be consecrated under the patronage of St. Rose.

In the Caribbean twin-island state of Trinidad and Tobago, the Santa Rosa Carib Community, located in Arima, is the largest organization of indigenous peoples on the island. The second oldest parish in the Diocese of Port of Spain is also named after this saint. The Santa Rosa Church, which is located in the town of Arima, was established on 20 April 1786, as the Indian Mission of Santa Rosa de Arima, on the foundations of a Capuchin Mission previously established in 1749.

On the Caribbean Island of Saint Lucia, there are two flower festivals supported by their Societies. Each society has a patron saint on whose feast day the grande fete is celebrated. For the Roses, it is the feast of St. Rose of Lima on 30 August; and for the Marguerites, it is that of St. Margaret Mary Alacoque, 17 October.

Rose's skull, surmounted with a crown of roses, is on public display at the Basilica in Lima, Peru, along with that of Martin de Porres. It was customary to keep the torso in the basilica and pass the head around the country.

She is also commemorated on 24 August in some places.

=== Patronage ===
Saint Rose is the patroness of the Americas, the indigenous people of the Americas, and of Peru (especially the city of Lima), Sittard in the Netherlands, of the Indies, and of the Philippines.

== In art ==
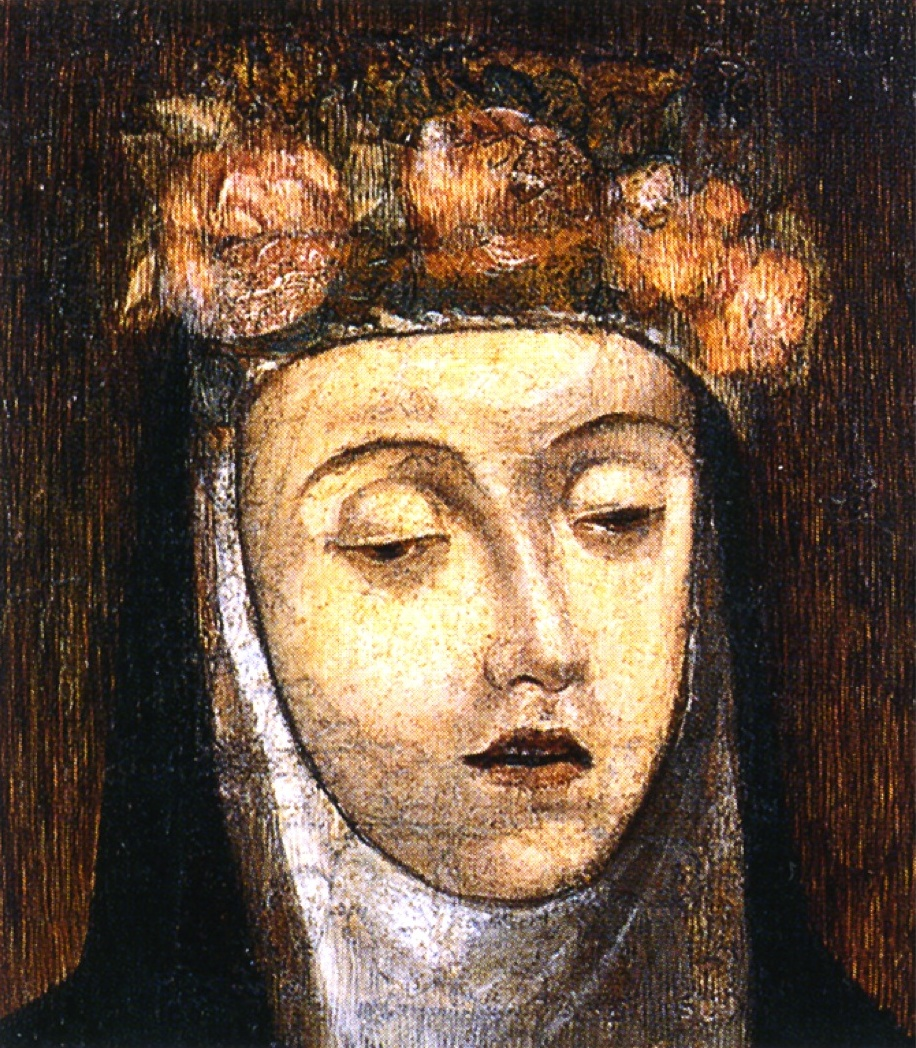
Angelino Medoro, Posthumous Portrait of St. Rose of Lima (1617)

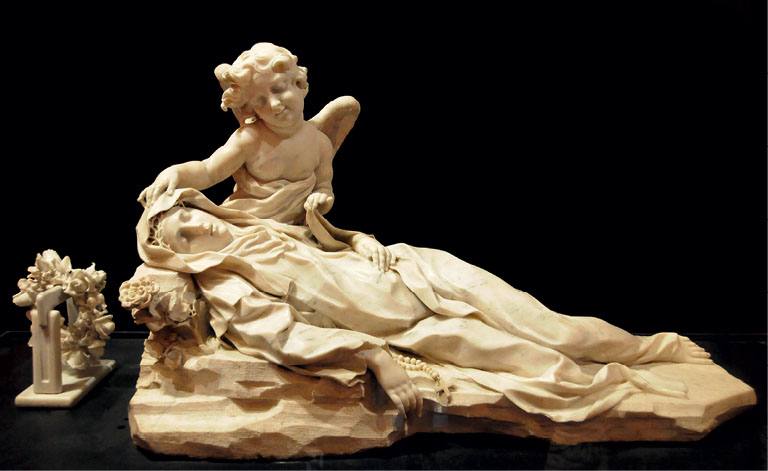
Melchiorre Caffà, St. Rose of Lima (1665)

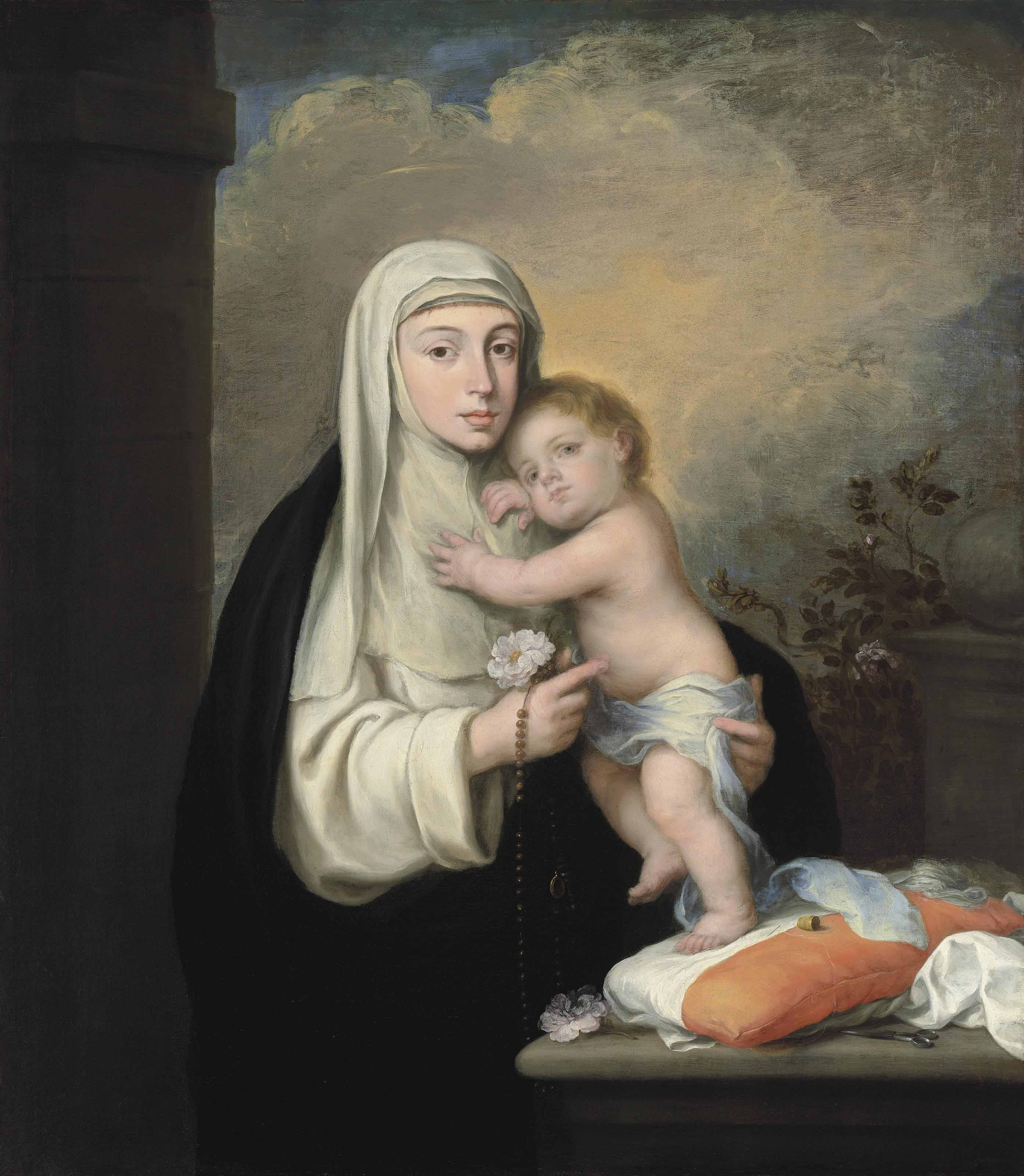
Bartolomé Esteban Murillo, St. Rose of Lima with the Christ Child (1670-1680)

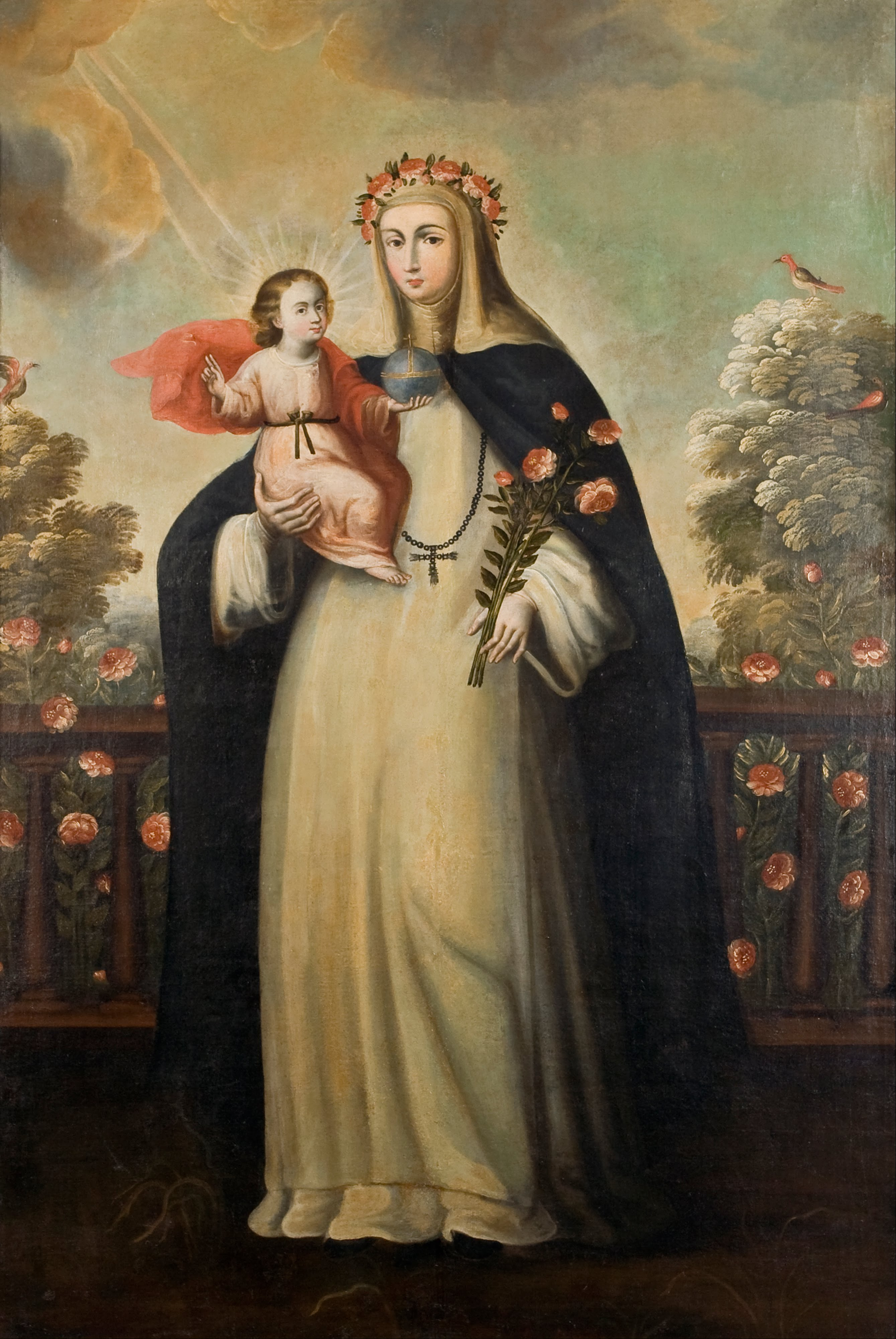
St. Rose of Lima with the Christ Child (c. 1680-1700)

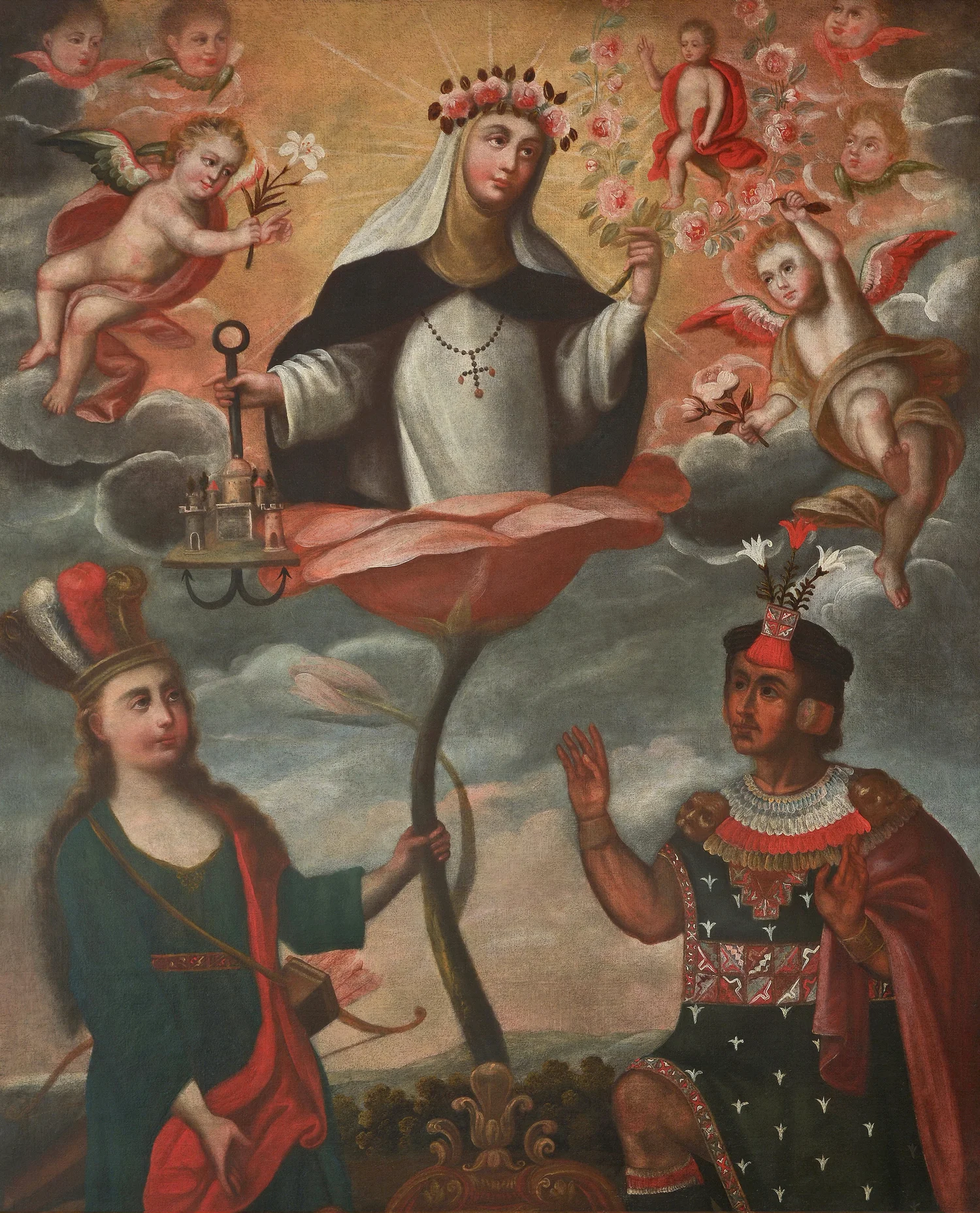
An Allegory of Saint Rose of Lima (c. 1730-60)

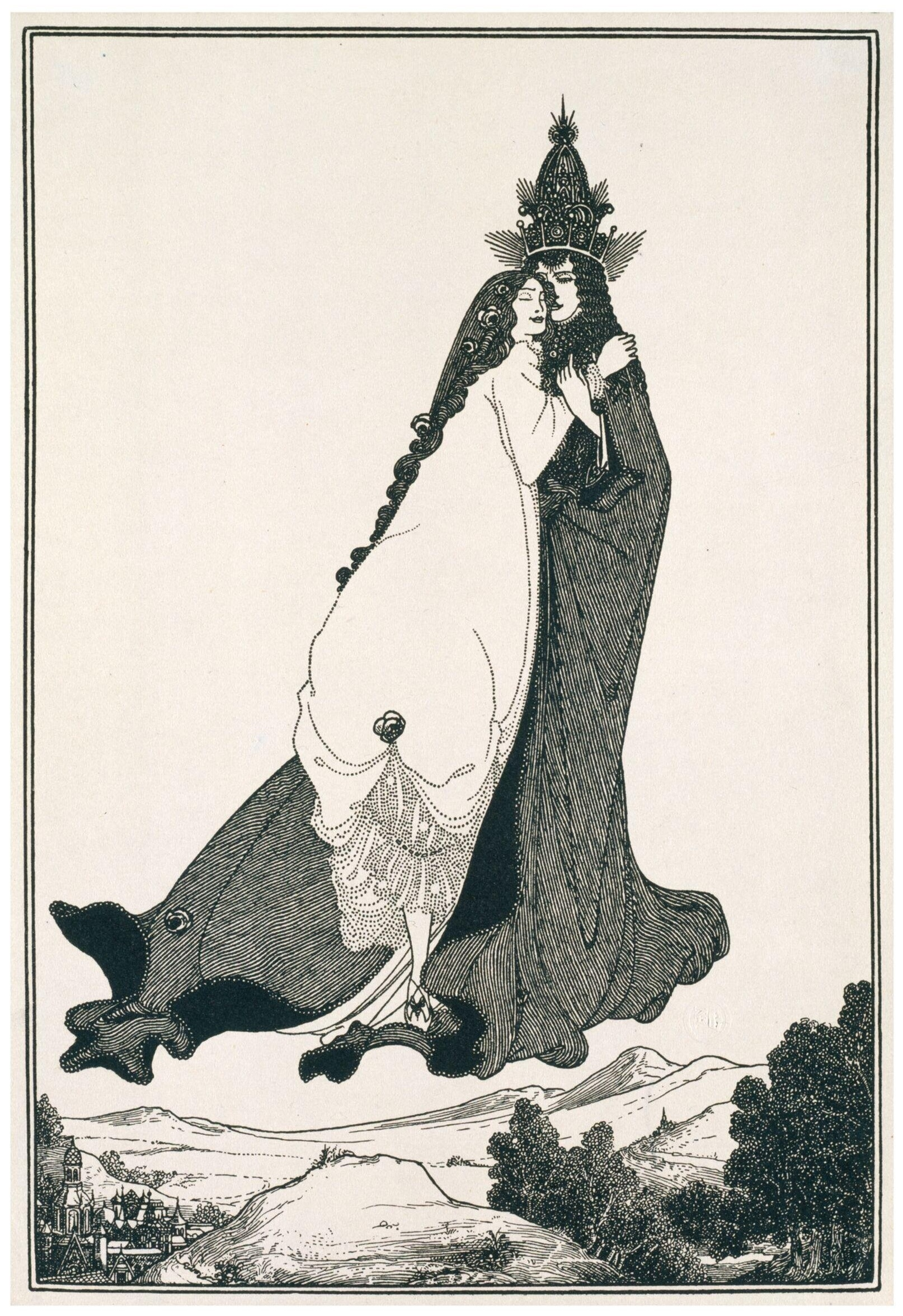
Aubrey Beardsley, The Ascension of Saint Rose of Lima (1896)

== Legacy ==
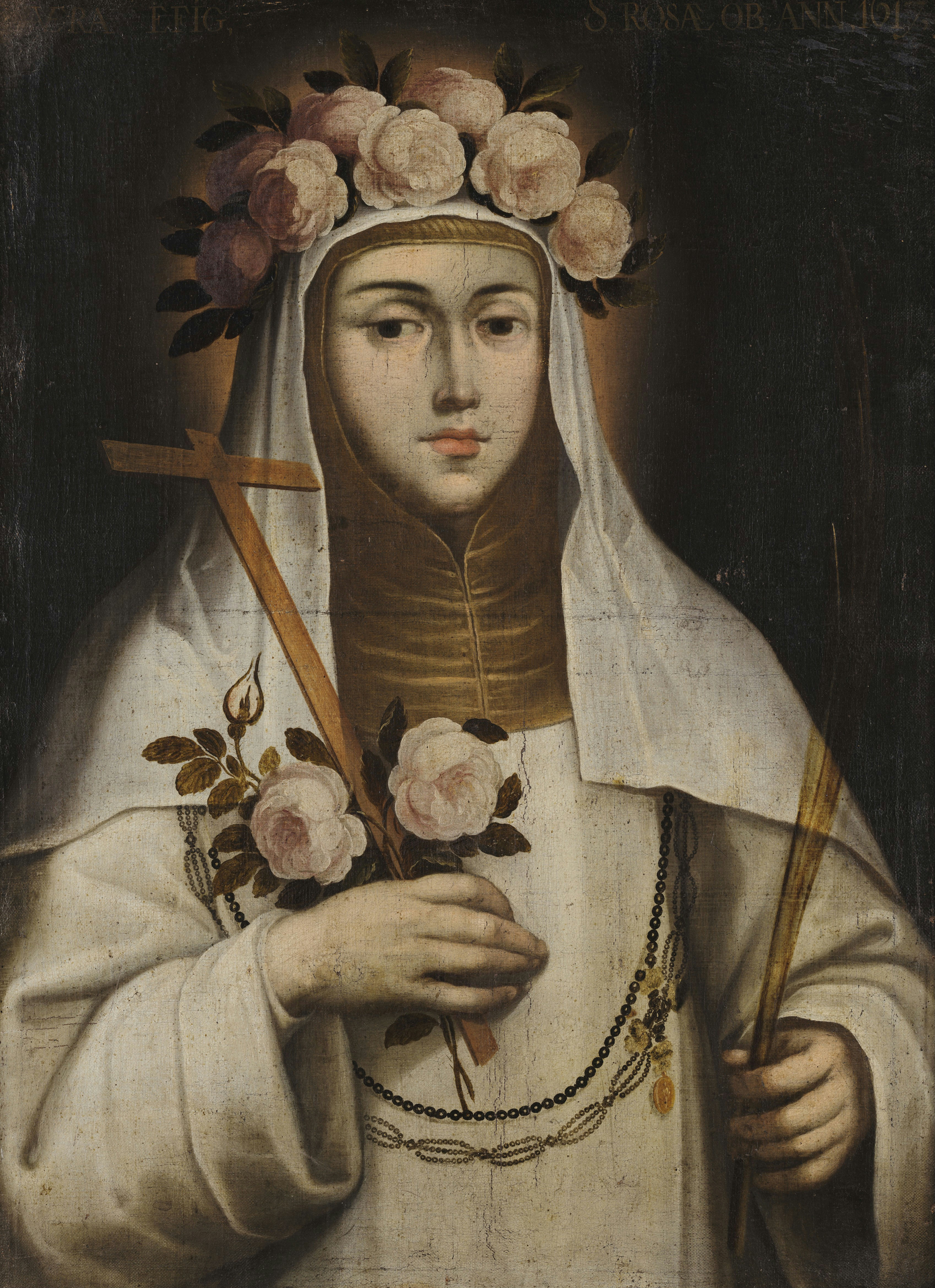
Colonial painting of Saint Rose of Lima (1680) by Colombian Gregorio Vásquez de Arce y Ceballos. Colonial Art Museum of Bogotá.

On the last weekend in August, the Fiesta de Santa Rosa is celebrated in Dixon, New Mexico, and the Sint Rosa Festival in Sittard, Netherlands. Also, in Sibbe, Netherlands, a maypole dedicated to Saint Rose is erected on the first Saturday after 23 August by the local Jonkheid.

A barony of Saint Rose of Lima was created in the Royal House of Rwanda on 25 July 2016 by the Catholic king in exile, King Kigeli V of Rwanda.

Dedicated parishes are located in:

=== Asia ===
- Cherai, Kerala, India
- Anayan, Pili, Camarines Sur, Philippines
- Bagong Ilog and Sumilang, Pasig, Philippines
- Santa Rosa, Laguna, Philippines
- Santa Rosa, Nueva Ecija, Philippines
- Santa Rosa de Lima, Alcoy, Cebu, Philippines
- Santa Rosa de Lima, Daanbantayan, Cebu, Philippines
- St. Rose of Lima, Teresa, Rizal, Philippines
- St. Rose of Lima, Bacacay, Albay, Philippines

=== Australia ===
- Kapunda, South Australia, Australia
- Collaroy Plateau, New South Wales, Australia
- Rosedale, Victoria, Australia

=== Europe ===
- Sittard, Netherlands
- Sibbe, Netherlands
- Weoley Castle, Birmingham, United Kingdom

=== North America ===
- Acadian Peninsula, New Brunswick, Canada
- Toronto, Ontario, Canada
- Sooke, British Columbia, Canada
- Sainte Rose du Lac, Manitoba, Canada
- Santa Rosa de Juarez, Oaxaca, Mexico
- Iglesia Santa Rosa de Lima, Santa Rosa de Lima, Celaya, Guanajuato, Mexico.
- Safford, Arizona, United States
- Chula Vista, California, United States
- Crockett, California, United States
- Maywood, California, US
- Paso Robles, California, United States
- Roseville, California, United States
- Santa Rosa, California, United States
- Simi Valley, California, United States
- Buena Vista, Colorado, United States
- Meriden, Connecticut, United States
- New Haven, Connecticut, United States (Closed 2022)
- Newtown, Connecticut, United States
- Milton, Florida, United States
- Miami Shores, Florida, United States
- Montrose, Illinois, United States
- Quincy, Illinois, United States
- Franklin, Indiana, United States
- Denison, Iowa, United States
- Great Bend, Kansas, United States
- Mount Vernon, Kansas, United States
- Cloverport, Kentucky, United States
- Springfield, Kentucky, United States
- Jay, Maine, United States
- Baltimore, Maryland, United States
- Gaithersburg, Maryland, United States
- Chelsea, Massachusetts, United States
- Chicopee, Massachusetts, United States
- Northborough, Massachusetts, United States
- Topsfield, Massachusetts, United States
- Hastings, Michigan, United States
- Roseville, Minnesota, United States
- De Soto, Missouri, United States
- Dillon, Montana, United States
- Reno, Nevada, United States
- Littleton, New Hampshire, United States
- Belmar, New Jersey, United States
- East Hanover, New Jersey, United States
- Haddon Heights, New Jersey, United States
- Freehold, New Jersey, United States
- Short Hills, New Jersey, United States
- Buffalo, New York, United States
- Forestville, New York, United States
- Lima, New York, United States
- Massapequa, New York, United States
- New York, New York, United States
- North Syracuse, New York, United States
- Rockaway Beach, Queens, New York, United States
- Hillsboro, North Dakota, United States
- Perry, Oklahoma, United States
- Cincinnati, Ohio, United States
- St. Rose, Ohio, United States
- Perrysburg, Ohio, United States
- Lima, Ohio, United States
- Altoona, Pennsylvania, United States
- Carbondale, Pennsylvania, United States
- Eddystone, Pennsylvania, United States
- Dillon, Montana, United States
- North Wales, Pennsylvania, United States
- York, Pennsylvania, United States
- Garretson, South Dakota, United States
- Murfreesboro, Tennessee, United States
- Andice, Texas, United States
- Houston, Texas, United States
- San Antonio, Texas, United States
- Layton, Utah, United States
- Cheney, Washington, United States
- Cuba City, Wisconsin, United States
- Milwaukee, Wisconsin, United States<
- Benavides, Texas, United States
- Bay St. Louis, Mississippi, United States<

=== South America ===
- Basilica Santuario de Santa Rosa de Lima Buenos Aires, Argentina
- Santa Rosa Church, Paramaribo, Suriname
- Arima, Trinidad and Tobago
- Lima, Peru
- Jaguaribara, Ceará, Brazil

=== Central America and Caribbean ===
- Rincón, Puerto Rico
- Venus Gardens, San Juan, Puerto Rico
- Ranchuelo, Villa Clara, Cuba
- Santa Rosa, Colón, Panama
- Santa Rosa de Lima, La Unión, El Salvador
- Santa Rosa Guachipilin, Santa Ana, El Salvador

== Gallery ==
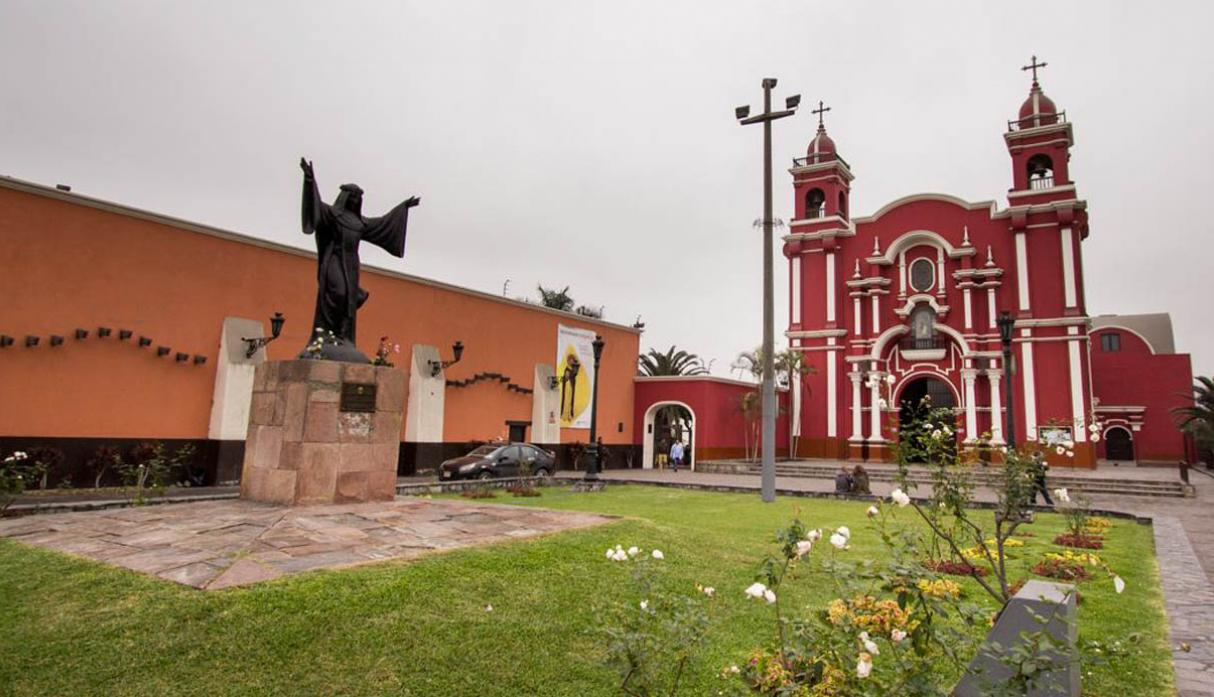
Temple, Sanctuary and Convent where she lived in Lima

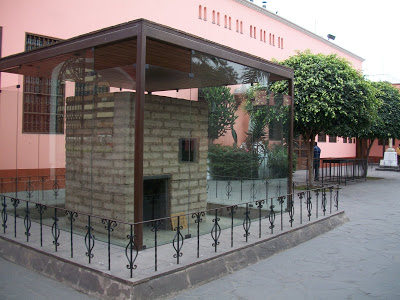
She converted a little hut in the backyard into a hermitage, where she often went to pray.

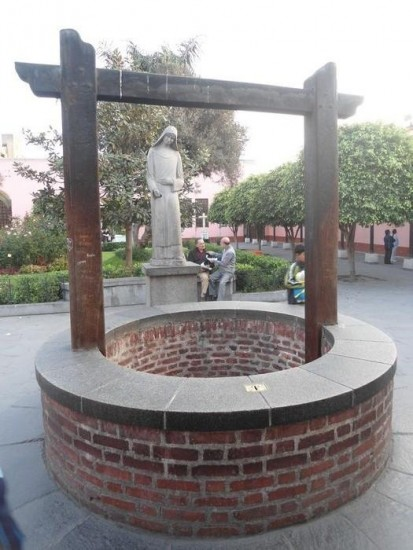
Water well into which devotees toss letters in memory of St. Rose

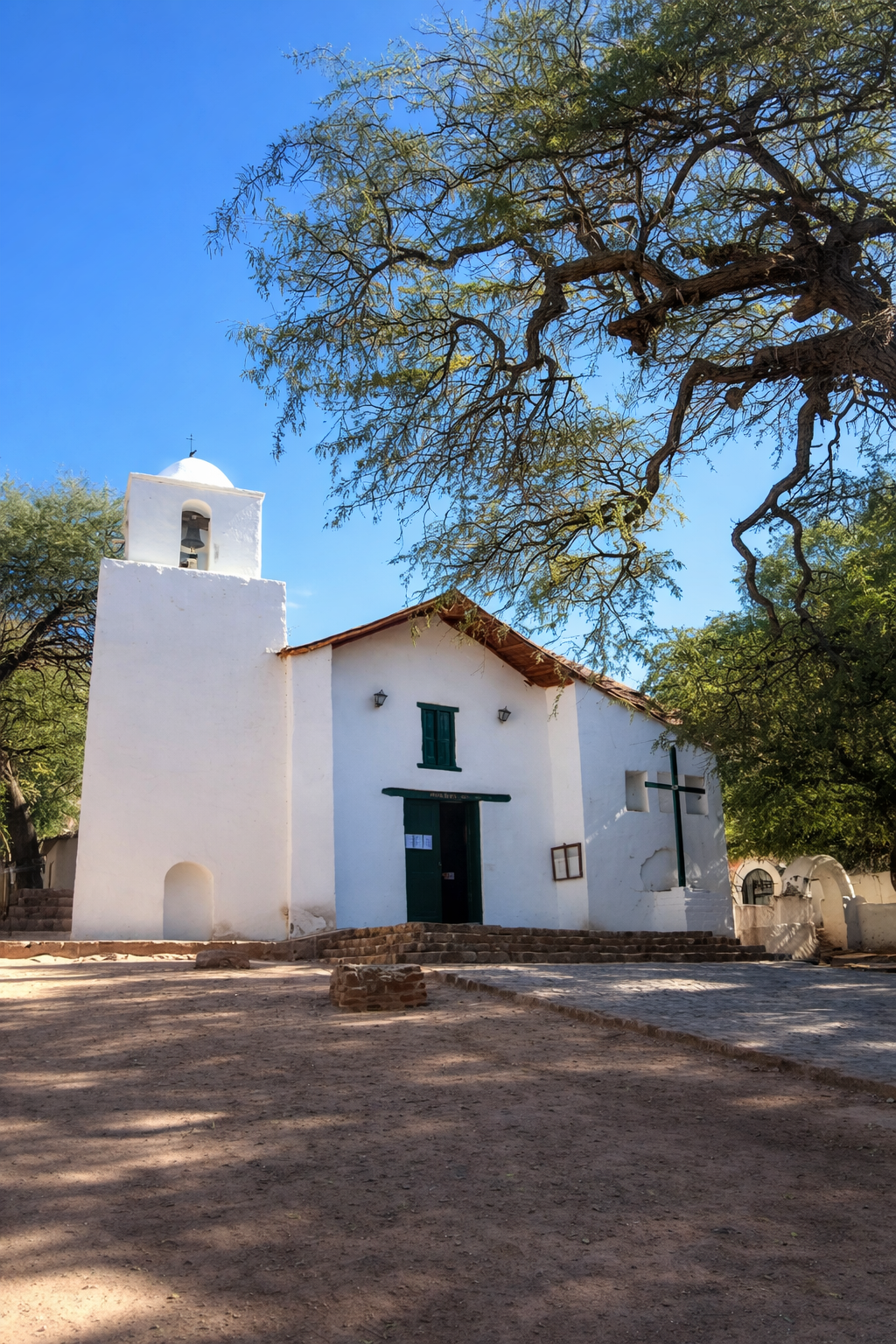
Iglesia de Santa Rosa de Lima un Purmamarca, Argentina

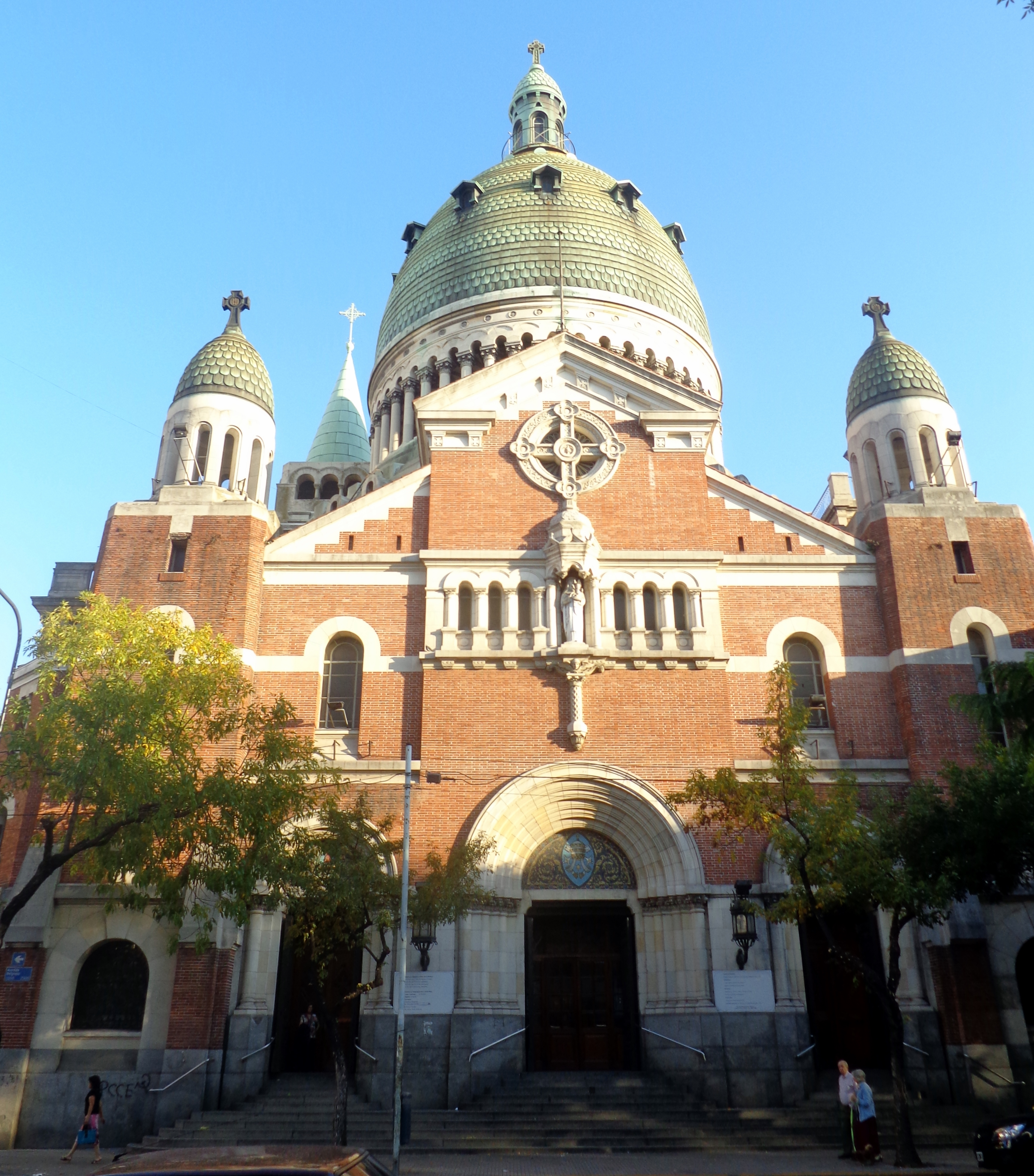
Basílica Santuario de Santa Rosa de Lima in Buenos Aires

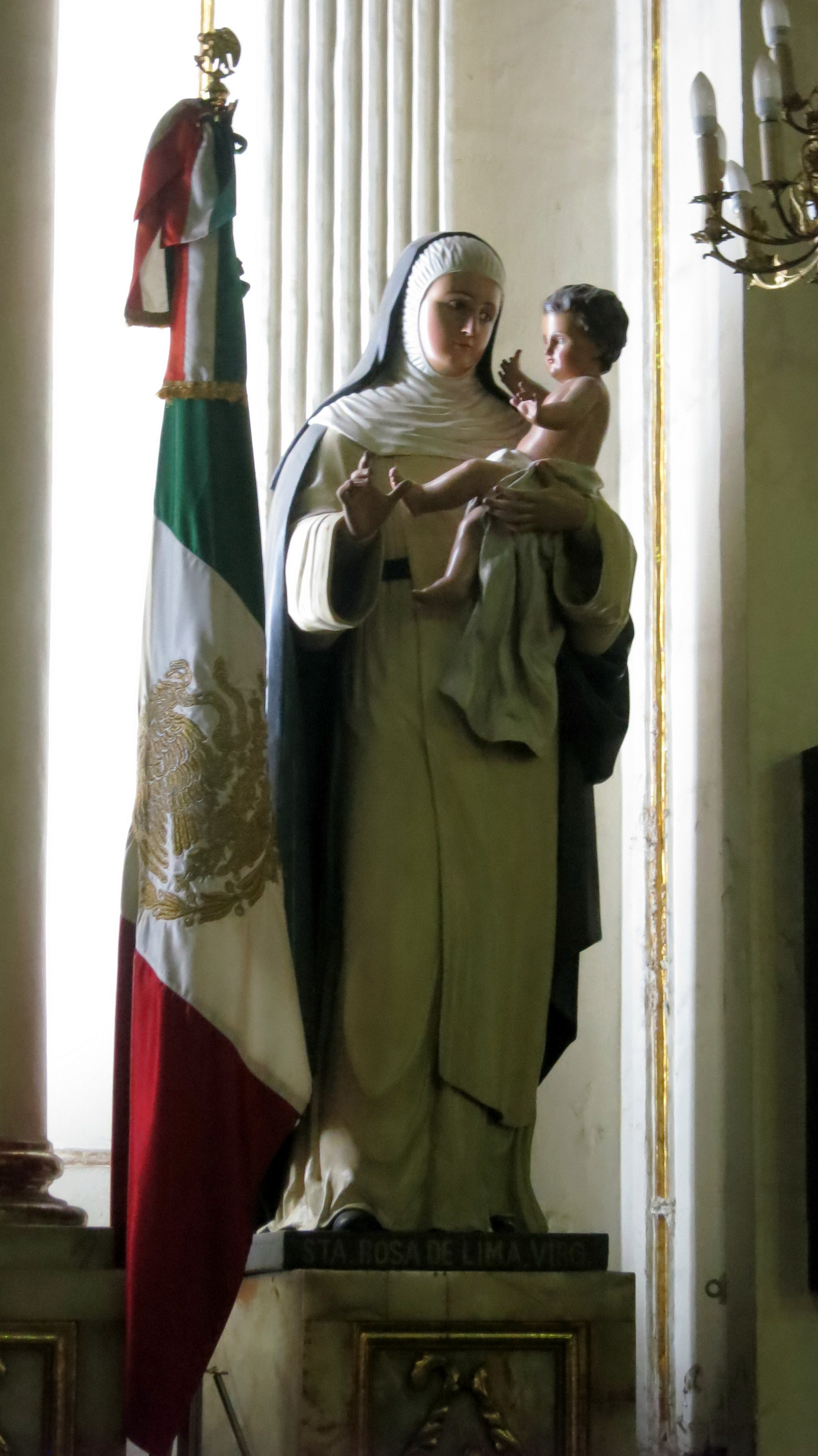
Statue of St. Rose of Lima in the Catedral de la Asunción de María Santísima in Guadalajara, Jalisco

== See also ==
- List of Catholic saints
- Sainte-Rose-de-Lima Church, Gatineau
