= Paul Leduc =

Paul Leduc may refer to:

- Paul Leduc (film director) (1942–2020), Mexican film director
- Paul Leduc (politician) (1889–1971), politician and lawyer in Ontario, Canada
- Paul LeDuc (wrestler) (1936–2026), Canadian wrestler
