= Ottawa—Vanier (provincial electoral district) =

Provincial electoral district in Ontario, Canada

Coordinates: 45°26′N 75°39′W

Ontario electoral district
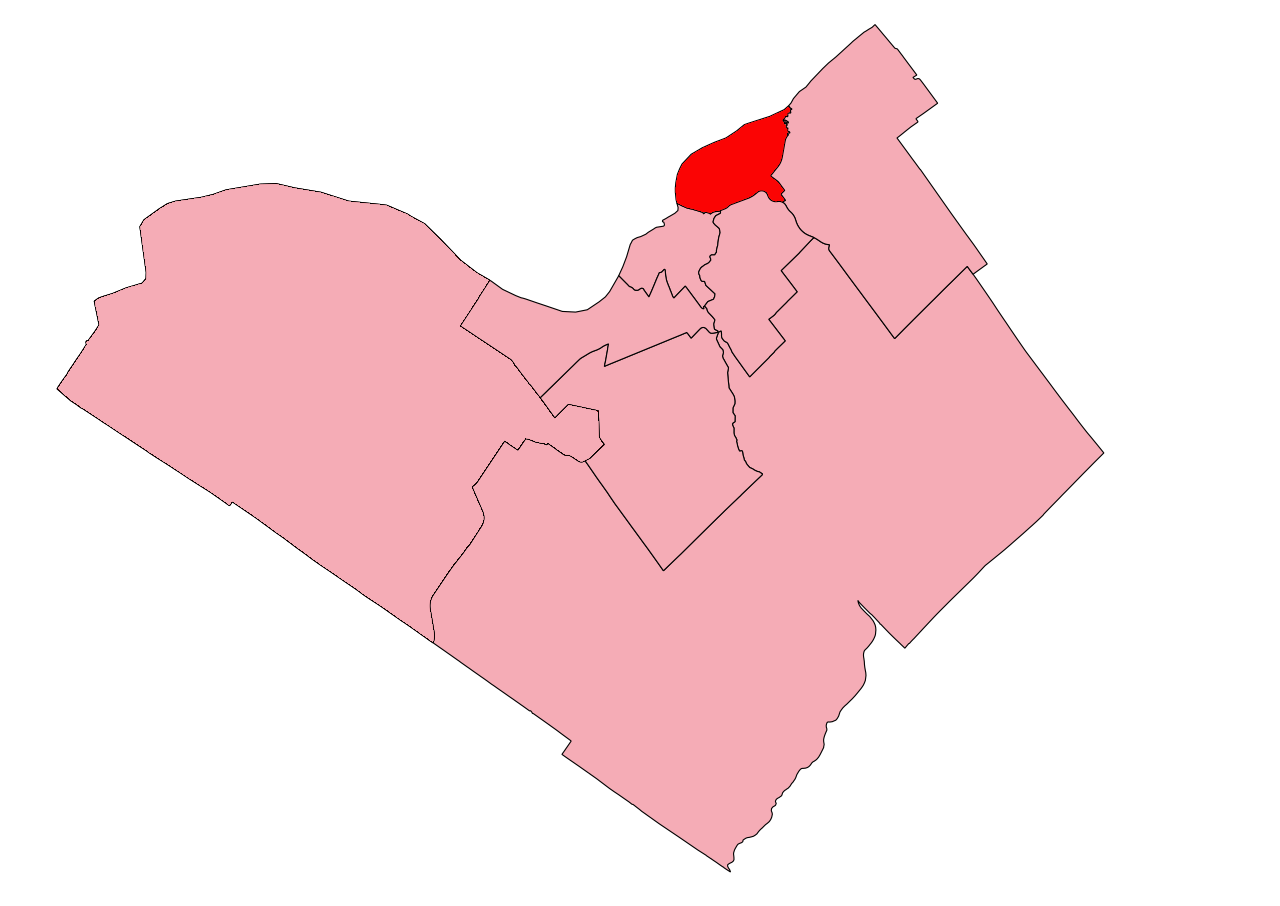
- Ottawa—Vanier in relation to other Ottawa electoral districts

Provincial electoral district
- Legislature: Legislative Assembly of Ontario
MPP
Lucille Collard
Liberal
- District created: 1908
- First contested: 1908
- Last contested: 2025

Demographics
- Population (2016): 111,510
- Electors (2020): 100,716
- Area (km²): 45
- Pop. density (per km²): 2,478
- Census division(s): Carleton County (1908-1969); Ottawa-Carleton (1969–2001); Ottawa (2001–present)
- Census subdivision(s): Ottawa; Eastview (1967-1969); Vanier (1969-2001); Rockcliffe Park (1999-2001); Gloucester (1987–2001)

Ottawa—Vanier (formerly known as Ottawa East) is a provincial electoral district in Ottawa, Ontario, Canada, that has been represented in the Legislative Assembly of Ontario since 1908. It is located in the east end of Ottawa.

The riding, with a large Franco-Ontarian population in Vanier, Overbrook, Lower Town, Forbes, Carson Meadows and adjoining neighbourhoods, has been one of the most solidly Liberal in the country in recent years, having elected Liberals both federally and provincially in every election since 1971.

A sizable minority of the riding is in the former city of Vanier, which was merged with Ottawa in 2000. Vanier has long been home to much of Ottawa's francophone population, but between 1992 and 2001, the size of this linguistic group has fallen by almost 50%. Since 2003, the population of the entire riding has fallen by almost 10% at a time when the rest of the nation's capital increased by approximately 5.2%. The riding now has the second oldest population in Ottawa.

In many ways, the riding which used to be known as a French riding with an English face has become a largely English-speaking riding (65%) with a French face. The riding also contains the wealthiest part of Ottawa, Rockcliffe Park, which gives some support to the Progressive Conservatives, but also to the Liberals. The neighbourhoods with higher proportions of anglophone residents, including Sandy Hill and New Edinburgh also tend to vote Liberal, but with significant support for the Ontario New Democratic Party. The riding is characterized by below average voter turn-out and an annual loss of approximately 1% in voter support for the provincial Liberals since 1987 thereby reducing their support from approximately 74% to 50% (1987–2007).

== Geography ==
In 2003, it was redefined as the part of the city of Ottawa east and north of a line running south along the Rideau Canal from the interprovincial boundary to Mann Avenue, northeast to Nicholas Street, southeast to Highway No. 417, and east to the abandoned Canadian Pacific Railway to the hydroelectric transmission line, north to Innes Road, northeast to Blair Road, northwest to Montreal Road, east and northeast to Regional Road No. 174, northeast to Green's Creek, north to the Ottawa River. It contains the neighbourhoods of Beacon Hill North, Cardinal Glen, Carson Grove, Carson Meadows, Castle Heights, Cyrville, Forbes, Lindenlea, Lower Town, Manor Park, New Edinburgh, Overbook, Pineview, Rockcliffe Park, Sandy Hill, Rothwell Heights, Vanier and Viscount Alexander Park.

== Demographics ==
According to the 2011 Canadian census

- Ethnic groups: 71.9% White, 9.5% Black, 3.5% Arab, 3.1% South Asian, 2.8% Aboriginal, 2.3% Chinese, 1.7% Latin American, 1.4% Filipino, 1.3% Southeast Asian, 1.1% West Asian
- Languages: 51.8% English, 30.6% French, 3.5% Arabic, 1.8% Spanish, 1.5% Chinese, 1.1% Creoles
- Religion: 65.9% Christian (44.6% Catholic, 4.7% Anglican, 3.3% United Church, 1.5% Christian Orthodox, 1.1% Baptist, 9.7% other Christian), 7.6% Muslim, 22.8% no religion.
- Average household income: $77,347
- Median household income: $57,035
- Average individual income: $45,200
- Median individual income: $32,421

== History ==
The provincial electoral district was created in 1908 as "Ottawa East". The name was changed to "Ottawa—Vanier" in 1999.

One MLA, elected through first past the post, represented the district.

=== Members of the Legislative Assembly/Members of Provincial Parliament ===
This district elected the following members of the Legislative Assembly of Ontario:

| Assembly | Years | Member | Party |
|---|---|---|---|
Ottawa East; Riding created from Ottawa
| 12th | 1908–1911 | Donald McDougal | Liberal |
| 13th | 1911–1914 | Napoléon Champagne | Conservative |
| 14th | 1914–1919 | Joseph Pinard | Liberal |
| 15th | 1919–1923 | Joseph Pinard | Liberal |
| 16th | 1923–1926 | Joseph Pinard | Liberal |
| 16th | 1926–1926 | Joseph Pinard | Independent-Liberal |
| 17th | 1926–1929 | Joseph Pinard | Independent-Liberal |
| 18th | 1929–1934 | Louis Côté | Conservative |
| 19th | 1934–1937 | Paul Leduc | Liberal |
| 20th | 1937–1940 | Paul Leduc | Liberal |
| 20th | 1940–1943 | Robert Laurier | Liberal |
| 21st | 1943–1945 | Robert Laurier | Liberal |
| 22nd | 1945–1948 | Aurele Chartrand | Liberal |
| 23rd | 1948–1951 | Aurele Chartrand | Liberal |
| 24th | 1951–1955 | Aurele Chartrand | Liberal |
| 25th | 1955–1959 | Jules Morin | Progressive Conservative |
| 26th | 1959–1963 | Jules Morin | Progressive Conservative |
| 27th | 1963–1967 | Horace Racine | Liberal |
| 28th | 1967–1971 | Jules Morin | Progressive Conservative |
| 29th | 1971–1975 | Albert Roy | Liberal |
| 30th | 1975–1977 | Albert Roy | Liberal |
| 31st | 1977–1981 | Albert Roy | Liberal |
| 32nd | 1981–1985 | Albert Roy | Liberal |
| 33rd | 1985–1987 | Bernard Grandmaître | Liberal |
| 34th | 1987–1990 | Bernard Grandmaître | Liberal |
| 35th | 1990–1995 | Bernard Grandmaître | Liberal |
| 36th | 1995–1999 | Bernard Grandmaître | Liberal |
Ottawa—Vanier
| 37th | 1999–2001 | Claudette Boyer | Liberal |
| 37th | 2001–2003 | Claudette Boyer | Independent |
| 38th | 2003–2007 | Madeleine Meilleur | Liberal |
| 39th | 2007–2011 | Madeleine Meilleur | Liberal |
| 40th | 2011–2014 | Madeleine Meilleur | Liberal |
| 41st | 2014–2016 | Madeleine Meilleur | Liberal |
| 41st | 2016–2018 | Nathalie Des Rosiers | Liberal |
| 42nd | 2018–2019 | Nathalie Des Rosiers | Liberal |
| 42nd | 2020–present | Lucille Collard | Liberal |

^{1} In 1938, the title of members of the Legislative Assembly of Ontario was changed from "Members of the Legislative Assembly" (MLAs) to "Members of Provincial Parliament" (MPPs).

== Election results ==
Winning party in each polling division of Ottawa—Vanier at the 2025 Ontario general election

Challenging the Liberal incumbent, Lucille Collard, is Francophone and minority rights activist Myriam Djilane of the NDP and senior policy adviser Marilissa Gosselin of the Progressive Conservatives. Djilane had previously run for the seat in the 2020 by-election.

2025 Ontario general election
| Party | Candidate | Votes | % | ±% |
|---|---|---|---|---|
| Liberal | Lucille Collard | 20,721 | 51.45 | +9.73 |
| Progressive Conservative | Marilissa Gosselin | 9,085 | 22.56 | +2.39 |
| New Democratic | Myriam Djilane | 7,350 | 18.25 | –7.68 |
| Green | Christian Proulx | 2,083 | 5.17 | –2.63 |
| Libertarian | Coreen Corcoran | 525 | 1.30 | +0.44 |
| New Blue | Rishabh Bhatia | 511 | 1.27 | +0.23 |
| Total valid votes | | 40,275 | 99.09 | |
| Total rejected, unmarked and declined ballots | | 371 | 0.91 | +0.24 |
| Turnout | | 40,646 | 38.82 | –0.60 |
| Eligible voters | | 104,696 | | |
| Liberal hold | | Swing | | +3.67 |
Source: Elections Ontario

Winning party in each polling division of Ottawa—Vanier at the 2022 Ontario general election

2022 Ontario general election
| Party | Candidate | Votes | % | ±% | Expenditures |
|---|---|---|---|---|---|
| Liberal | Lucille Collard | 16,132 | 41.71 | –10.50 | $80,016 |
| New Democratic | Lyra Evans | 10,026 | 25.93 | +0.67 | $54,961 |
| Progressive Conservative | Patrick Mayangi | 7,798 | 20.16 | +8.47 | $22,402 |
| Green | Christian Proulx | 3,019 | 7.81 | –0.78 | $9,017 |
| Ontario Party | Eric Armstrong-Giroux | 587 | 1.52 | – | $506 |
| New Blue | Michael Pastien | 400 | 1.03 | – | $1,737 |
| Libertarian | Coreen Corcoran | 335 | 0.87 | +0.22 | $786 |
| None of the Above | Blake Hamilton | 210 | 0.54 | +0.07 | $565 |
| Freedom | David McGruer | 166 | 0.43 | – | $0 |
| Total valid votes/expense limit | | 38,673 | 99.32 | – | $142,255 |
| Total rejected, unmarked and declined ballots | | 263 | 0.68 | +0.13 | |
| Turnout | | 38,936 | 39.42 | +19.53 | |
| Eligible voters | | 98,774 | | | |
| Liberal hold | | Swing | | –5.59 | |
Source: Elections Ontario

Ontario provincial by-election, February 27, 2020 Resignation of Nathalie Des Rosiers
| Party | Candidate | Votes | % | ±% |
|---|---|---|---|---|
| Liberal | Lucille Collard | 10,403 | 52.22 | +9.36 |
| New Democratic | Myriam Djilane | 5,031 | 25.25 | –4.42 |
| Progressive Conservative | Patrick Mayangi | 2,329 | 11.69 | –9.69 |
| Green | Ben Koczwarski | 1,710 | 8.58 | +4.51 |
| Independent | Julie Fiala | 188 | 0.94 | – |
| Libertarian | Ken Lewis | 129 | 0.65 | –0.04 |
| None of the Above | Above Znoneofthe | 95 | 0.48 | –0.38 |
| Ontario Alliance | J. Justin O'Donnell | 38 | 0.19 | – |
| Total valid votes | | 19,923 | 99.45 | |
| Total rejected, unmarked and declined ballots | | 110 | 0.55 | –0.65 |
| Turnout | | 20,033 | 19.89 | –31.58 |
| Eligible voters | | 100,716 | | |
| Liberal hold | | Swing | | +6.89 |
Source: Elections Ontario

2018 Ontario general election
| Party | Candidate | Votes | % | ±% |
|---|---|---|---|---|
| Liberal | Nathalie Des Rosiers | 20,555 | 42.86 | −12.30 |
| New Democratic | Lyra Evans | 14,232 | 29.68 | +16.56 |
| Progressive Conservative | Fadi Nemr | 10,252 | 21.38 | −1.64 |
| Green | Sheilagh McLean | 1,955 | 4.08 | –3.73 |
| None of the Above | Keegan Bennett | 413 | 0.86 | N/A |
| Libertarian | Ken Lewis | 332 | 0.69 | N/A |
| Freedom | David McGruer | 219 | 0.46 | N/A |
| Total valid votes | | 47,958 | 98.80 | |
| Total rejected ballots | | 581 | 1.20 | |
| Turnout | | 48,539 | 51.47 | |
| Eligible voters | | 94,298 | | |
| Liberal hold | | Swing | | -14.43 |
Source: Elections Ontario

^ Change is from 2014 general election redistributed results.

2014 general election redistributed results
| Party | Vote | % |
|---|---|---|
| Liberal | 23,392 | 55.16 |
| Progressive Conservative | 9,763 | 23.02 |
| New Democratic | 5,564 | 13.12 |
| Green | 3,311 | 7.81 |
| Others | 377 | 0.89 |

Ontario provincial by-election, November 17, 2016 Resignation of Madeleine Meilleur
| Party | Candidate | Votes | % | ±% |
|---|---|---|---|---|
| Liberal | Nathalie Des Rosiers | 14,979 | 49.19 | -6.37 |
| Progressive Conservative | André Marin | 9,051 | 29.72 | +7.43 |
| New Democratic | Claude Bisson | 4,459 | 14.64 | +1.33 |
| Green | Raphaël Morin | 993 | 3.26 | -4.75 |
| Stop the New Sex-Ed Agenda | Elizabeth de Viel Castel | 384 | 1.26 | |
| Libertarian | Dean T. Harris | 177 | 0.58 | -0.26 |
| None of the Above | Above Znoneofthe | 164 | 0.54 | |
| Canadian Constituents' | Stephanie McEvoy | 74 | 0.24 | |
| People's Political Party | Kevin Clarke | 73 | 0.24 | |
| Freedom | David McGruer | 52 | 0.17 | |
| Pauper | John Turmel | 48 | 0.16 | |
| Total valid votes | | 30,454 | 99.50 | |
| Total rejected ballots | | 153 | 0.50 | -0.80 |
| Turnout | | 30,607 | 37.36 | -11.49 |
| Eligible voters | | 81,902 | | |
| Liberal hold | | Swing | | -6.90 |
Source(s) Elections Ontario

2014 Ontario general election
| Party | Candidate | Votes | % | ±% |
|---|---|---|---|---|
| Liberal | Madeleine Meilleur | 21,810 | 55.55 | +4.04 |
| Progressive Conservative | Martin Forget | 8,750 | 22.29 | -1.16 |
| New Democratic | Hervé Ngamby | 5,228 | 13.32 | -6.29 |
| Green | Dave Bagler | 3,144 | 8.01 | +3.49 |
| Libertarian | Phillip Richard | 329 | 0.84 | |
| Total valid votes | | 39,261 | 98.70 | |
| Total rejected, unmarked and declined ballots | | 517 | 1.30 | +0.88 |
| Turnout | | 39,778 | 48.86 | +2.05 |
| Eligible voters | | 81,412 | | |
| Liberal hold | | Swing | | +2.60 |
Source(s) "Valid Votes Cast for Each Candidate" (PDF). Elections Ontario. 2016.

2011 Ontario general election
| Party | Candidate | Votes | % | ±% | Expenditures |
|---|---|---|---|---|---|
| Liberal | Madeleine Meilleur | 19,619 | 51.51 | +0.55 | $ 52,761.46 |
| Progressive Conservative | Fred Sherman | 8,929 | 23.44 | +1.14 | 46,634.99 |
| New Democratic | Paul Étienne Laliberté-Tipple | 7,466 | 19.60 | +4.89 | 26,579.32 |
| Green | Dave Bagler | 1,719 | 4.51 | −5.93 | 28,290.65 |
| Family Coalition | Emmanuel Houle | 352 | 0.92 | −0.04 | 3,081.81 |
| Total valid votes / expense limit | | 38,085 | 99.58 | | $ 97,305.11 |
| Total rejected, unmarked and declined ballots | | 161 | 0.42 | −0.24 | |
| Turnout | | 38,246 | 46.81 | −4.69 | |
| Eligible voters | | 81,712 | | | |
| Liberal hold | | Swing | | −0.30 | |
Source(s) "Summary of Valid Votes Cast for Each Candidate – October 6, 2011 General Election" (PDF). "Statistical Summary – General Elections 2011" ( XLS Spreadsheet (71KB)). Elections Ontario. "2011 Candidate Campaign Returns (CR-1)".

2007 Ontario general election
| Party | Candidate | Votes | % | ±% | Expenditures |
|---|---|---|---|---|---|
| Liberal | Madeleine Meilleur | 20,954 | 50.96 | −1.16 | $ 67,322.66 |
| Progressive Conservative | Bruce Poulin | 9,169 | 22.30 | −3.87 | 46,691.00 |
| New Democratic | Ric Dagenais | 6,049 | 14.71 | −1.41 | 38,228.43 |
| Green | Leonard Poole | 4,293 | 10.44 | +4.86 | 10,062.52 |
| Family Coalition | Frank Cioppa | 396 | 0.96 | | 1,599.17 |
| Independent | Robert Larter | 255 | 0.62 | | 0.00 |
| Total valid votes/expense limit | | 41,116 | 99.34 | | $ 86,807.16 |
| Total rejected ballots | | 274 | 0.66 | | |
| Turnout | | 41,390 | 51.49 | | |
| Eligible voters | | 80,377 | | | |
| Liberal hold | | Swing | | +1.36 | |
Source(s) "Summary of Valid Votes Cast for Each Candidate – October 10, 2007 General Election" (PDF). "Statistical Summary – General Election 2007" (PDF). Elections Ontario. "2007 Candidate Campaign Returns (CR-1)".

^ Change is from redistributed results.

2003 general election redistributed results
| Party | Vote | % |
|---|---|---|
| Liberal | 19,271 | 52.12 |
| Progressive Conservative | 9,676 | 26.17 |
| New Democratic | 5,962 | 16.13 |
| Green | 2,063 | 5.58 |

2003 Ontario general election
| Party | Candidate | Votes | % | ±% | Expenditures |
|---|---|---|---|---|---|
| Liberal | Madeleine Meilleur | 22,188 | 53.53 | +0.50 | $ 56,519.01 |
| Progressive Conservative | Maurice Lamirande | 10,878 | 26.24 | −5.57 | 25,275.00 |
| New Democratic | Joseph Zebrowski | 6,507 | 15.70 | +5.19 | 21,295.58 |
| Green | Raphael Thierrin | 1,876 | 4.53 | +2.12 | 591.94 |
| Total valid votes/expense limit | | 41,449 | 99.05 | +4.62 | $ 79,080.96 |
| Total rejected ballots | | 399 | 0.95 | −0.04 | |
| Turnout | | 41,848 | 50.80 | +1.68 | |
| Eligible voters | | 82,376 | | +1.12 | |
| Liberal hold | | Swing | | +3.04 | |
Source(s) "General Election of October 2, 2003 – Summary of Valid Ballots by Candidate". Elections Ontario. "General Election of October 2, 2003 – Statistical Summary". "2003 Candidate and Constituency Associations – Candidate Campaign Return (CR-1)".

1999 Ontario general election
| Party | Candidate | Votes | % | ±% | Expenditures |
|---|---|---|---|---|---|
| Liberal | Claudette Boyer | 21,009 | 53.03 | −3.91 | $ 29,251.18 |
| Progressive Conservative | Maurice Lamirande | 12,605 | 31.81 | +10.64 | 26,664.80 |
| New Democratic | David Gagnon | 4,163 | 10.51 | −8.49 | 19,834.85 |
| Green | Richard Briggs | 953 | 2.41 | +1.09 | 0.00 |
| Natural Law | Pierrette Blondin | 580 | 1.46 | +0.43 | 0.00 |
| Independent | Kevin Corkill | 310 | 0.78 | | 49.11 |
| Total valid votes/expense limit | | 39,620 | 99.01 | +56.27 | $ 78,205.44 |
| Total rejected ballots | | 395 | 0.99 | −0.30 | |
| Turnout | | 40,015 | 49.12 | −4.09 | |
| Eligible voters | | 81,464 | | +68.76 | |
Source(s) "General Election of June 3 1999 – Summary of Valid Ballots by Candidate". "General Election of June 3 1999 – Statistical Summary". Elections Ontario. "1999 Candidate and Constituency Associations – Candidate Campaign Return (CR-1)".

=== Ottawa East ===
1995 Ontario general election: Ottawa East
| Party | Candidate | Votes | % | ±% | Expenditures |
|---|---|---|---|---|---|
| Liberal | Bernard Grandmaître | 14,436 | 56.94 | –5.47 | $19,824.52 |
| Progressive Conservative | Cynthia Bled | 5,368 | 21.17 | +12.77 | $28,483.15 |
| New Democratic | David Dyment | 4,818 | 19.00 | –4.27 | $17,425.03 |
| Green | Larry J. Tyldsley | 335 | 1.32 | –1.44 | $524.72 |
| Natural Law | Robert Mayer | 261 | 1.03 | – | $0 |
| Independent | Steven Edward White | 136 | 0.54 | – | $0 |
| Total valid votes/expense limit | | 25,354 | 98.71 | – | $45,818.00 |
| Total rejected, unmarked and declined ballots | | 331 | 1.29 | +0.07 | |
| Turnout | | 25,685 | 53.21 | –2.02 | |
| Eligible voters | | 48,272 | | | |
| Liberal hold | | Swing | | –9.12 | |
Source: Elections Ontario

1990 Ontario general election: Ottawa East
| Party | Candidate | Votes | % | ±% |
|---|---|---|---|---|
| Liberal | Bernard Grandmaître | 16,363 | 62.41 | –11.85 |
| New Democratic | Lori Lucier | 6,103 | 23.28 | +7.07 |
| Progressive Conservative | Diana Morin | 2,203 | 8.40 | –1.13 |
| Family Coalition | Richard R. Hudon | 826 | 3.15 | – |
| Green | Frank de Jong | 723 | 2.76 | – |
| Total valid votes | | 26,218 | 98.78 | |
| Total rejected, unmarked and declined ballots | | 324 | 1.22 | +0.52 |
| Turnout | | 26,542 | 55.23 | +2.28 |
| Eligible voters | | 48,055 | | |
| Liberal hold | | Swing | | –9.46 |
Source: Elections Ontario

1987 Ontario general election: Ottawa East
| Party | Candidate | Votes | % | ±% |
|---|---|---|---|---|
| Liberal | Bernard Grandmaître | 18,959 | 74.26 | +5.86 |
| New Democratic | Alex Connelly | 4,137 | 16.20 | –2.40 |
| Progressive Conservative | Corinne L. Prince | 2,435 | 9.54 | –1.04 |
| Total valid votes | | 25,531 | 99.30 | |
| Total rejected ballots | | 181 | 0.70 | +0.05 |
| Turnout | | 25,712 | 52.95 | +3.86 |
| Eligible voters | | 48,558 | | |
| Liberal hold | | Swing | | +4.13 |
Source: Elections Ontario

1985 Ontario general election: Ottawa East
| Party | Candidate | Votes | % | ±% |
|---|---|---|---|---|
| Liberal | Bernard Grandmaître | 14,601 | 68.40 | +0.03 |
| New Democratic | Kathryn Barnard | 3,971 | 18.60 | +5.10 |
| Progressive Conservative | Paul St. Georges | 2,257 | 10.57 | –6.48 |
| Independent | Serge Girard | 518 | 2.43 | +1.35 |
| Total valid votes | | 21,347 | 99.34 | |
| Total rejected ballots | | 141 | 0.66 | +0.17 |
| Turnout | | 21,488 | 49.09 | +21.13 |
| Eligible voters | | 43,770 | | |
| Liberal hold | | Swing | | –2.54 |
Source: Elections Ontario

Ontario provincial by-election, December 13, 1984: Ottawa East Resignation of Albert J. Roy
| Party | Candidate | Votes | % | ±% |
|---|---|---|---|---|
| Liberal | Bernard Grandmaître | 7,754 | 68.37 | –0.85 |
| Progressive Conservative | Richard Boudreau | 1,934 | 17.05 | –3.58 |
| New Democratic | Jean Gilbert | 1,531 | 13.50 | +4.22 |
| Independent | Serge Girard | 122 | 1.08 | +0.21 |
| Total valid votes | | 11,341 | 99.52 | |
| Total rejected ballots | | 55 | 0.48 | –1.42 |
| Turnout | | 11,396 | 27.96 | –20.99 |
| Eligible voters | | 40,757 | | |
| Liberal hold | | Swing | | +1.37 |
Source: Elections Ontario

1981 Ontario general election: Ottawa East
| Party | Candidate | Votes | % | ±% |
|---|---|---|---|---|
| Liberal | Albert Roy | 14,207 | 69.22 | +1.78 |
| Progressive Conservative | Omer Deslauriers | 4,235 | 20.63 | +3.40 |
| New Democratic | Danielle Pagé | 1,905 | 9.28 | –6.04 |
| Independent | Serge Girard | 177 | 0.86 | – |
| Total valid votes | | 20,524 | 98.09 | |
| Total rejected ballots | | 399 | 1.91 | +1.28 |
| Turnout | | 20,923 | 48.95 | –3.08 |
| Eligible voters | | 42,747 | | |
| Liberal hold | | Swing | | –0.81 |
Source: Elections Ontario

1977 Ontario general election: Ottawa East
| Party | Candidate | Votes | % | ±% |
|---|---|---|---|---|
| Liberal | Albert Roy | 15,864 | 67.44 | +6.48 |
| Progressive Conservative | Gisèle Lalonde | 4,055 | 17.24 | –3.22 |
| New Democratic | Robert Choquette | 3,605 | 15.32 | –3.26 |
| Total valid votes | | 23,524 | 99.37 | |
| Total rejected ballots | | 148 | 0.63 | +0.05 |
| Turnout | | 23,672 | 52.03 | –0.97 |
| Eligible voters | | 45,497 | | |
| Liberal hold | | Swing | | +4.85 |
Source: Elections Ontario

1975 Ontario general election: Ottawa East
| Party | Candidate | Votes | % | ±% |
|---|---|---|---|---|
| Liberal | Albert Roy | 14,900 | 60.96 | +8.44 |
| Progressive Conservative | David Dehler | 5,001 | 20.46 | –7.19 |
| New Democratic | Robert Cournoyer | 4,543 | 18.59 | +1.17 |
| Total valid votes | | 24,444 | 99.43 | |
| Total rejected ballots | | 141 | 0.57 | –0.42 |
| Turnout | | 24,585 | 53.00 | –4.10 |
| Eligible voters | | 46,387 | | |
| Liberal hold | | Swing | | +7.81 |
Source: Elections Ontario

1971 Ontario general election: Ottawa East
| Party | Candidate | Votes | % | ±% |
|---|---|---|---|---|
| Liberal | Albert Roy | 10,827 | 52.52 | +6.15 |
| Progressive Conservative | Jules Morin | 5,700 | 27.65 | –18.79 |
| New Democratic | Denis Deneau | 3,590 | 17.41 | +10.22 |
| Independent | Richard Morin | 499 | 2.42 | – |
| Total valid votes | | 20,616 | 99.01 | |
| Total rejected ballots | | 207 | 0.99 | –0.27 |
| Turnout | | 20,823 | 57.10 | +6.40 |
| Eligible voters | | 36,467 | | |
| Liberal gain from Progressive Conservative | | Swing | | +12.47 |
Source: Elections Ontario

1967 Ontario general election: Ottawa East
| Party | Candidate | Votes | % | ±% |
|---|---|---|---|---|
| Progressive Conservative | Jules Morin | 8,155 | 46.44 | +2.89 |
| Liberal | Horace Racine | 8,143 | 46.37 | –5.08 |
| New Democratic | Frederick R. Cote | 1,263 | 7.19 | +2.19 |
| Total valid votes | | 17,561 | 98.74 | |
| Total rejected ballots | | 224 | 1.26 | +0.30 |
| Turnout | | 17,785 | 50.70 | –7.32 |
| Eligible voters | | 35,079 | | |
| Progressive Conservative gain from Liberal | | Swing | | +3.98 |
Source: Elections Ontario

1933–1966
Ottawa Ward, By Ward, Rideau Ward, St. George's Ward, Riverdale Ward (east of Main Street), Victoria Ward (east of Parkdale Avenue)

1963 Ontario general election: Ottawa East
| Party | Candidate | Votes | % | ±% |
|---|---|---|---|---|
| Liberal | Horace Racine | 8,814 | 51.45 | +4.11 |
| Progressive Conservative | Jules Morin | 7,461 | 43.55 | –5.72 |
| New Democratic | Harry Pope | 857 | 5.00 | +1.61 |
| Total valid votes | | 17,132 | 99.04 | |
| Total rejected ballots | | 166 | 0.96 | –0.03 |
| Turnout | | 17,298 | 58.02 | +7.14 |
| Eligible voters | | 29,816 | | |
| Liberal gain from Progressive Conservative | | Swing | | +4.92 |
Source: Elections Ontario

1959 Ontario general election: Ottawa East
| Party | Candidate | Votes | % | ±% |
|---|---|---|---|---|
| Progressive Conservative | Jules Morin | 7,965 | 49.27 | –2.05 |
| Liberal | Paul Leduc | 7,652 | 47.34 | +2.52 |
| Co-operative Commonwealth | Donald Prot | 548 | 3.39 | –0.47 |
| Total valid votes | | 16,165 | 99.01 | |
| Total rejected ballots | | 162 | 0.99 | –0.27 |
| Turnout | | 16,327 | 50.87 | +3.85 |
| Eligible voters | | 32,093 | | |
| Progressive Conservative hold | | Swing | | –2.29 |
Source: Elections Ontario

1955 Ontario general election: Ottawa East
| Party | Candidate | Votes | % | ±% |
|---|---|---|---|---|
| Progressive Conservative | Jules Morin | 8,688 | 51.32 | +11.87 |
| Liberal | Aurèle Chartrand | 7,586 | 44.81 | –5.26 |
| Co-operative Commonwealth | Henri Robert | 654 | 3.86 | –6.61 |
| Total valid votes | | 16,928 | 98.73 | |
| Total rejected ballots | | 217 | 1.27 | +0.06 |
| Turnout | | 17,145 | 47.03 | –11.27 |
| Eligible voters | | 36,459 | | |
| Progressive Conservative gain from Liberal | | Swing | | +8.57 |
Source: Elections Ontario

1951 Ontario general election: Ottawa East
| Party | Candidate | Votes | % | ±% |
|---|---|---|---|---|
| Liberal | Aurèle Chartrand | 10,722 | 50.08 | +4.25 |
| Progressive Conservative | Henri St-Jacques | 8,447 | 39.45 | +1.57 |
| Co-operative Commonwealth | Henri Robert | 2,242 | 10.47 | –3.46 |
| Total valid votes | | 21,411 | 98.79 | |
| Total rejected ballots | | 262 | 1.21 | +0.26 |
| Turnout | | 21,673 | 58.30 | +3.05 |
| Eligible voters | | 37,176 | | |
| Liberal hold | | Swing | | +1.34 |
Source: Elections Ontario

1948 Ontario general election: Ottawa East
| Party | Candidate | Votes | % | ±% |
|---|---|---|---|---|
| Liberal | Aurèle Chartrand | 9,407 | 45.83 | +3.46 |
| Progressive Conservative | Lorenzo Lafleur | 7,777 | 37.88 | +17.00 |
| Co-operative Commonwealth | Henri Robert | 2,859 | 13.93 | +5.10 |
| Union of Electors | Patrice Brunet | 485 | 2.36 | – |
| Total valid votes | | 20,528 | 99.05 | |
| Total rejected ballots | | 197 | 0.95 | –0.45 |
| Turnout | | 20,725 | 55.25 | –10.72 |
| Eligible voters | | 37,511 | | |
| Liberal hold | | Swing | | –6.77 |
Source: Elections Ontario

1945 Ontario general election: Ottawa East
| Party | Candidate | Votes | % | ±% |
|---|---|---|---|---|
| Liberal | Aurèle Chartrand | 10,725 | 42.36 | –32.34 |
| Independent Liberal | Auguste Vincent | 6,017 | 23.77 | – |
| Progressive Conservative | Christie A. McDonald | 5,287 | 20.88 | +1.80 |
| Co-operative Commonwealth | Arthur A. Marchand | 2,234 | 8.82 | – |
| Independent | John C. Beauchamp | 464 | 1.83 | – |
| Independent | Max Feller | 342 | 1.35 | –4.87 |
| Social Credit | M. Alexandre Denommée | 247 | 0.98 | – |
| Total valid votes | | 25,316 | 98.60 | |
| Total rejected ballots | | 359 | 1.40 | +0.07 |
| Turnout | | 25,675 | 65.97 | +23.15 |
| Eligible voters | | 38,918 | | |
| Liberal hold | | Swing | | –16.17 |
Source: Elections Ontario

1943 Ontario general election: Ottawa East
| Party | Candidate | Votes | % | ±% |
|---|---|---|---|---|
| Liberal | Robert Laurier | 11,004 | 74.70 | –16.73 |
| Progressive Conservative | James-Aimé Cronier | 2,811 | 19.08 | – |
| Independent | Max Feller | 916 | 6.22 | – |
| Total valid votes | | 14,731 | 98.67 | |
| Total rejected ballots | | 199 | 1.33 | +1.33 |
| Turnout | | 14,930 | 42.83 | – |
| Eligible voters | | 34,862 | | |
| Liberal hold | | Swing | | –8.36 |
Source: Elections Ontario

Ontario provincial by-election, November 27, 1940: Ottawa East Resignation of Paul Leduc
| Party | Candidate | Votes | % | ±% |
|---|---|---|---|---|
| Liberal | Robert Laurier | 10,193 | 91.43 | +11.78 |
| Social Credit | Alexandre Denomme | 625 | 5.61 | +3.07 |
| Independent Liberal | Aldege Scott | 331 | 2.97 | – |
| Total valid votes | | 11,149 | 100.00 | |
| Total rejected ballots | | – | | |
| Turnout | | 11,149 | – | – |
| Eligible voters | | | | |
| Liberal hold | | Swing | | +4.35 |
Source: Elections Ontario

1937 Ontario general election: Ottawa East
| Party | Candidate | Votes | % | ±% |
|---|---|---|---|---|
| Liberal | Paul Leduc | 16,920 | 79.65 | +36.28 |
| Conservative | M. Nelson J. Lacasse | 3,786 | 17.82 | –12.77 |
| Social Credit | M. Alexandre Denommée | 538 | 2.53 | – |
| Total valid votes | | 21,244 | 98.98 | |
| Total rejected ballots | | 220 | 1.03 | –1.24 |
| Turnout | | 21,464 | 67.75 | –13.35 |
| Eligible voters | | 31,681 | | |
| Liberal hold | | Swing | | +24.52 |
Source: Elections Ontario

1934 Ontario general election: Ottawa East
| Party | Candidate | Votes | % | ±% |
|---|---|---|---|---|
| Liberal | Paul Leduc | 10,314 | 43.37 | +1.08 |
| Conservative | Eugene Joseph Labelle | 7,275 | 30.59 | –27.13 |
| Independent Liberal | Joseph Albert Pinard | 6,116 | 25.71 | –16.57 |
| Independent Liberal | Aurelien Rose | 79 | 0.33 | – |
| Total valid votes | | 23,784 | 97.74 | |
| Total rejected ballots | | 550 | 2.26 | +1.47 |
| Turnout | | 24,334 | 81.10 | +30.63 |
| Eligible voters | | 30,006 | | |
| Liberal gain from Conservative | | Swing | | +14.10 |
Source: Elections Ontario

1908–1933
Ottawa Ward, By Ward, Rideau Ward, St. George's Ward

1929 Ontario general election: Ottawa East
| Party | Candidate | Votes | % | ±% |
|---|---|---|---|---|
| Conservative | Louis Côté | 7,813 | 57.72 | +17.38 |
| Liberal | Joseph Albert Pinard | 5,724 | 42.28 | –1.58 |
| Total valid votes | | 13,537 | 99.21 | |
| Total rejected ballots | | 108 | 0.79 | –0.68 |
| Turnout | | 13,645 | 50.47 | –3.13 |
| Eligible voters | | 27,037 | | |
| Conservative gain from Independent Liberal | | Swing | | +9.48 |
Source: Elections Ontario

1926 Ontario general election: Ottawa East
| Party | Candidate | Votes | % | ±% |
|---|---|---|---|---|
| Independent Liberal | Joseph Albert Pinard | 5,195 | 43.86 | –15.49 |
| Conservative | Moses Doctor | 4,777 | 40.33 | – |
| Independent Conservative | Eugene Joseph Labelle | 1,872 | 15.81 | – |
| Total valid votes | | 11,844 | 98.53 | |
| Total rejected ballots | | 177 | 1.47 | –2.21 |
| Turnout | | 12,021 | 53.60 | +16.45 |
| Eligible voters | | 22,427 | | |
| Independent Liberal hold | | Swing | | –7.74 |
Source: Elections Ontario

1923 Ontario general election: Ottawa East
| Party | Candidate | Votes | % | ±% |
|---|---|---|---|---|
| Liberal | Joseph Albert Pinard | 4,635 | 59.35 | –4.22 |
| Liberal | J. Wilfred Gauvreau | 3,175 | 40.65 | –22.91 |
| Total valid votes | | 7,810 | 96.31 | |
| Total rejected ballots | | 299 | 3.69 | +0.36 |
| Turnout | | 8,109 | 37.15 | –23.94 |
| Eligible voters | | 21,830 | | |
| Liberal hold | | Swing | | +9.35 |
Source: Elections Ontario

1919 Ontario general election: Ottawa East
| Party | Candidate | Votes | % | ±% |
|---|---|---|---|---|
| Liberal | Joseph Albert Pinard | 7,309 | 63.57 | +9.81 |
| Labour | Videle Lafortune | 2,878 | 25.03 | – |
| Conservative | Olivier Durocher | 1,311 | 11.40 | –26.00 |
| Total valid votes | | 11,498 | 96.67 | |
| Total rejected ballots | | 396 | 3.33 | +1.27 |
| Turnout | | 11,894 | 61.09 | –10.58 |
| Eligible voters | | 19,471 | | |
| Liberal hold | | Swing | | +4.91 |
Source: Elections Ontario

1914 Ontario general election: Ottawa East
| Party | Candidate | Votes | % | ±% |
|---|---|---|---|---|
| Liberal | Joseph Albert Pinard | 2,843 | 53.75 | +18.21 |
| Conservative | Napoléon Champagne | 1,978 | 37.40 | –27.06 |
| Independent Liberal | John G. Kilt | 468 | 8.85 | – |
| Total valid votes | | 5,289 | 97.94 | |
| Total rejected ballots | | 111 | 2.06 | +1.00 |
| Turnout | | 5,400 | 71.67 | +11.10 |
| Eligible voters | | 7,535 | | |
| Liberal gain from Conservative | | Swing | | +22.64 |
Source: Elections Ontario

1911 Ontario general election: Ottawa East
| Party | Candidate | Votes | % | ±% |
|---|---|---|---|---|
| Conservative | Napoléon Champagne | 2,842 | 64.46 | +19.00 |
| Liberal | Louis J. Kehoe | 1,567 | 35.54 | –19.00 |
| Total valid votes | | 4,409 | 98.95 | |
| Total rejected ballots | | 47 | 1.05 | +0.42 |
| Turnout | | 4,456 | 60.57 | –17.54 |
| Eligible voters | | 7,357 | | |
| Conservative gain from Liberal | | Swing | | +19.00 |
Source: Elections Ontario

1908 Ontario general election: Ottawa East
| Party | Candidate | Votes | % |
|---|---|---|---|
| Liberal | Donald Joseph McDougal | 2,798 | 54.54 |
| Conservative | Napoléon Champagne | 2,332 | 45.46 |
| Total valid votes | | 5,130 | 99.36 |
| Total rejected ballots | | 33 | 0.64 |
| Turnout | | 5,163 | 78.11 |
| Eligible voters | | 6,610 | |
| Liberal pickup new district. | | | |
Source: Elections Ontario

== 2007 electoral reform referendum ==
2007 Ontario electoral reform referendum
| Side | Votes | % |
|---|---|---|
| First Past the Post | 24,562 | 61.12 |
| Mixed Member Proportional | 15,624 | 38.88 |
| Total | 40,186 | |

== See also ==
- List of Ontario provincial electoral districts
- Canadian provincial electoral districts
