= Special Investigations Unit (Ontario) =

Civilian police oversight agency of Ontario, Canada

- Unité des enquêtes spéciales

Unit overview
- Formed: 1990
- Jurisdiction: Ontario police services
- Headquarters: 5090 Commerce Boulevard Mississauga, Ontario
- Motto: One Law for All
- Annual budget: $6.9 million
- Minister responsible: Hon. Doug Downey, Attorney General of Ontario
- Unit executive: Joseph Martino, Director
- Key document: Special Investigations Unit Act, 2019 (S.O. 2019, c. 1, Sched. 5)
- Website: www.siu.on.ca

The Special Investigations Unit (SIU, or "the Unit"; French: Unité des enquêtes spéciales, UES) is the civilian police oversight agency of the province of Ontario, Canada. The SIU is responsible for investigating circumstances involving police that have resulted in a death or serious injury, or if a firearm was discharged at a person. The unit also investigates allegations of sexual assault. The unit's goal is to ensure that criminal law is applied appropriately to police conduct, as determined through independent investigations, increasing public confidence in the police services.

The director is responsible to the Attorney General of Ontario, and the unit as an "arm's-length" agency of the Ministry of the Attorney General. The current director is Joseph Martino; he initially served in an acting capacity from April 2019 prior to his formal appointment in November 2019.

== Overview ==
As a provincial civilian law enforcement agency, the SIU has the power and authority to investigate police officers regulated by the Special Investigations Unit Act and charge them with criminal offences. The SIU oversees 47 police services and upwards of 23,000 police officers from municipal, regional, and provincial services. However, the SIU does not have the authority to investigate First Nations constables, or federal police officers such as those employed by the Royal Canadian Mounted Police (RCMP) or Canadian Forces Military Police.

Ontario is the first province to have such a civilian oversight agency in place, and one of the few jurisdictions worldwide with an independent civilian agency. (In 2007 Alberta created the Alberta Serious Incident Response Team, and in September, 2012, the Independent Investigations Office was established in British Columbia). As a result, the SIU has become a model of civilian oversight for other jurisdictions in the light of the international movement towards greater civilian accountability of the police.

After more than 30 years of operating under the Police Services Act, the SIU is now regulated by the Special Investigations Unit Act which came into force on December 1, 2020. The legislation serves to strengthen civilian oversight of law enforcement and increase transparency.

The SIU are completely independent of the police and have an arms-length relationship with the government. This means that although the SIU director reports to the provincial attorney general, the decision-making on cases and their day-to-day activities are independent of the government.

The SIU Lab

== History ==
Before the SIU, police services investigated themselves or in some instances, another police service was assigned to conduct the investigation.

In December 1988, the Ontario government established the Task Force on Race Relations and Policing following the deaths of several black men. During hearings conducted by the task force, there was public concern, spearheaded by the Black Action Defence Committee, about a conflict of interest when the police conduct their own investigations.

The task force's report recommended 57 changes in the law and policing policies. As a result, the SIU was formed in 1990 under a new Ontario Police Services Act, introduced by Ontario Solicitor General Steven Offer. Initially, the SIU was headquartered in Toronto, but in 2000 it moved to its current location in Mississauga.

== Notification ==
The police are legally obliged to notify the SIU to report any incidents that may fall within the SIU's jurisdiction, which is set out in section 16(1) of the Ontario SIU Act. Also, the SIU receives and acts on requests from members of the media, lawyers, coroners, medical professionals, the Law Enforcement Complaints Agency and affected people who allege they have been injured or sexually assaulted by police. Once the SIU is notified, an investigative supervisor gathers information to determine whether the complaint/incident falls within their mandate. If so, they will launch an investigation.

== Investigations ==
The SIU investigates a car crash.

Although the circumstances of every case are unique, the approach to most investigations is the same. The investigative process begins by assigning a lead investigator and as many investigators, forensic investigators, and resources as necessary.

Investigations typically involve:

- Collecting evidence and securing it for forensic examination
- Interviewing witnesses
- Arranging for medical care
- Notifying the coroner if necessary
- Submitting an investigation brief, which is reviewed by the investigative supervisor, the executive officer, and the director.

Once all of the facts are gathered, the Director then makes a decision as to whether or not charges are warranted. Under section 35(1) of the SIU Act, the SIU director must ensure that the investigation is concluded within 120 days and provide public note or, failing that, provide a public statement on the status of the investigation every 30 days.

== Investigators ==
The SIU consists of investigators from both civilian and police backgrounds. All of the Unit's investigators have extensive experience investigating serious incidents, such as deaths, sexual assault allegations, serious assaults, shootings, and motor vehicle incidents, and have their own secure facilities where investigations take place.

=== Forensics investigators ===
Forensic Investigators

In the beginning, due to a shortage of resources, the SIU often relied on the Ontario Provincial Police for forensic investigation assistance and would involve the police services for interviewing witnesses. Similarly, there were many cases where the police service conducted the investigation under SIU supervision. This was a problem because the public still saw the police being policed by the police. As a result, the SIU's budget was increased to $4.7 million in the 1999–2000 fiscal year.

Currently, the SIU is equipped with their own in-house forensic identification team, staffed entirely by civilians. They are now well equipped with tools and personnel. The in-house forensic identification team is an important part of most investigations. It is managed by two supervisors and staffed by a handful of forensic identification technicians and includes a fully equipped laboratory. The forensics identification team is responsible for protecting, collecting, preserving, and analyzing the physical evidence. Their duties include the interpretation of trace evidence and recording of the autopsy process. The team has particular expertise in several areas of forensics, including collision reconstructions, scene mapping, and bloodstain pattern analysis. They also liaise with scientists at the Centre of Forensic Sciences in Ontario and other external experts for DNA analysis and ballistics.

== Director ==
List of Directors of the Special Investigations Unit
Name	From	Notes
Joseph Martino	2019–present	acting, April to November; former deputy SIU director; former lawyer
Tony Loparco	2013–2019	former provincial Crown attorney (Toronto area); longest serving director
Ian D. Scott	2008–2013	former provincial Crown attorney (Toronto area)
James Lawrence Cornish	2004–2008	former acting provincial Crown attorney (Norfolk County); assistant Crown attorney (Haldimand County and Milton)
John Sutherland	2003–2004	former provincial assistant Crown attorney (London and Toronto) and criminal defence lawyer; now Justice with the Ontario Court of Justice (Toronto)
Peter A. Tinsley	1999–2002	former international prosecutor at Bosnia–Herzegovina and Kosovo/UNMIK for the United Nations, director of Hastings County Law Society and former member of the Canadian Forces (military police officer and for the Office of the Judge Advocate General); now chair of the federal government's Military Police Complaints Commission)
André Marin	1996–1998	former Crown attorney (Ottawa), University of Ottawa law professor, Canadian Forces ombudsman and Ontario ombudsman
James M. Stewart	1996	acting director; director of Crown Attorney's Office East Region (Ottawa)
John Harty Osler	1990–1995	former Ontario High Court of Justice 1968–1990; partner in Jolliff Lewis and Osler

== Affected Persons Program ==
Dealing in a compassionate and respectful manner with injured persons and families of those whose deaths are subject of an investigation is a top priority. To highlight this commitment, an affected persons coordinator (APC) position was developed in 2005, contributing to the ability of the SIU to respond meaningfully to the social needs of those persons impacted by the SIU investigations.

The APC takes the lead in liaising with affected individuals and/or families. The primary function of the APC is to do a very specific kind of outreach by helping persons impacted by the SIU investigations access required support services, such as professional counselling, financial assistance or admission into rehabilitation programs.

The APC also sends condolences to families that experience a death as a result of the police action that the SIU is investigating, and follows up to offer further assistance. The coordinator's services are available on a 24/7 basis and can be offered over the telephone or in person.

== Occurrences ==
The following data is sourced from the SIU's annual reports:

Types of Occurrences	1996–97	1997–98	1998–99	1999-00	2000–01	2001–02	2002–03	2003–04	2004–05	2005–06	2006–07	2007–08	2008–09	2009–10	2010–11	2011–12	2012–13	2013–14	2014–15	Totals to date
Firearm Deaths	9	4	1	3	5	4	1	2	8	8	6	7	4	7	10	8	5	9	6	107
Firearm Injuries	12	10	9	8	8	5	9	8	4	10	11	14	10	5	12	12	8	8	3	166
Custody Deaths	24	12	18	21	18	19	17	26	15	22	35	21	27	16	30	17	34	20	12	404
Custody Injuries	42	52	65	68	85	75	86	90	58	107	129	124	128	172	163	172	218	200	154	2188
Other Injuries/Deaths	N/A	N/A	N/A	1	2	1	1	0	2	0	0	1	2	4	1	1	3	3	6	28
Vehicle Deaths	8	5	12	10	8	12	7	9	9	9	5	9	7	9	4	6	7	11	6	153
Vehicle Injuries	57	56	64	43	36	31	21	41	30	25	28	29	33	50	27	33	48	33	38	723
Sexual Assault Complaints	8	9	11	10	15	15	9	16	11	23	24	41	34	24	44	55	49	34	41	473
Totals	160	148	180	156	177	162	151	192	137	204	238	246	299	287	291	304	372	318	266	4288
Number of cases in which charges laid (number of officers charged in parentheses)	3	2	3 (6)	6 (6)	5 (9)	4 (5)	4 (4)	2 (2)	3 (4)	4 (4)	2 (2)	7 (10)	4 (4)	10 (12)	12 (12)	11 (13)	14 (17)	10 (11)	13 (12)	119 (133)

== Accusations of bias ==
The SIU has been accused of having a pro-police bias.

The attorney general stated in a 2003 report that:

Civilian oversight in the form of the SIU was intended to assist chiefs of police in shouldering their daunting duties, not to be an irritant. The fact that the SIU overwhelmingly clears officers should be seen by the [public] as an endorsement of good policing.

In 2007, the Ontario ombudsman, André Marin launched an investigation and a year later released a scathing 121-page report "hammer[ing] the SIU for allowing the police to control its investigations and adopting an 'impotent stance' when challenged by police." Marin said, "There's no doubt in my mind that an SIU investigation is one which is currently done through blue-coloured glasses. There is no doubt that there is a police bias in their approach to investigations". The report also said, "The SIU has not only become complacent about ensuring that police officials follow the rules, it has bought into the fallacious argument that SIU investigations aren't like other criminal cases and it is acceptable to treat police witnesses differently from civilians."

Ian Scott, who was a prosecutor before he became director of the SIU, said in 2004 that police officers accused of excessive force had a one-in-five chance of getting the same level of justice as a civilian charged with a similar offense. But the actual figures as reported in 2008 in the Toronto Star suggest that ratio is much lower. The Star reported that of the 3,400 investigations conducted by the SIU (to that date), 95 resulted in criminal charges, 16 of those resulted in conviction, and only three police officers went to jail.

In 2011, the ombudsmen again investigated the SIU and the ministry responsible, the Ministry of the Attorney General. He released a report on the investigation in December. While he conceded that the Unit had improved over the past three years, he still found the ministry to be "actively working against the SIU director”. He found that "the ministry of the attorney general actively undermines the SIU, the watchdog that probes police-related deaths, serious injuries and sexual assaults and that "police officers either obstructed or failed to co-operate with the SIU in more than one-third of its cases in the past three years." He recommended legislation be enacted to better support the SIU. In response to his report, Attorney General John Gerretsen was quoted as saying, "There are always improvements that can be made to any system and whether or not legislation is in the offing remains to be seen. Only time will tell, I suppose.”

== Affiliations ==
- Canadian Association for Civilian Oversight of Law Enforcement (CACOLE)
- First Nations Liaison Program – to foster a constructive growth in the SIU's relationship with First Nations communities.
- The SIU also runs several presentations and lectures at academic institutions, community centres, trade shows, jobs of professional associations. This is a positive interaction with the community, police officers and young people to educate them about the role and responsibility of the SIU.

== See also ==
- Death of Sammy Yatim
- Civilian oversight of law enforcement
- List of police complaints authorities
