= Yatim =

Yatim (Arabic: يتيم, with the meaning "orphan" both in its Malay, Hindi (as "yateem") and Arabic language areas of distribution) is an Indonesian, Malaysian and Arabic family name.
Notable people with the surname include:

- Rais Yatim (born 1942), Malaysian politician
- Sammy Yatim (1994–2013), Canadian of Aramean descent shot by a Toronto Police Service officer
