= Pauline Rochefort =

Canadian politician

Pauline Rochefort MP

Parliamentary Secretary to the Secretary of State (Rural Development)
- Incumbent
- Assumed office June 5, 2025

Member of Parliament for Nipissing—Timiskaming
- Incumbent
- Assumed office April 28, 2025
- Preceded by: Anthony Rota

Mayor of East Ferris
- In office October 1, 2018 – May 8, 2025
- Preceded by: Bill Vrebosch
- Succeeded by: Richard Champagne

Personal details
- Born: June 17, 1957 (age 69) Astorville, Ontario, Canada
- Party: Liberal
- Spouse: Ronald Roy
- Education: Laurentian University (BCom); University of Ottawa (MBA)
- Website: paulinerochefort.liberal.ca

Pauline Rochefort (born June 17, 1957) is a Canadian politician who has served as the member of Parliament for the riding of Nipissing—Timiskaming as a member of the Liberal Party of Canada since 2025. Prior to entering federal politics, she served as the mayor of East Ferris, Ontario from 2018 to 2025.

== Background ==
Rochefort was born June 17, 1957, the second child of Rolande and Bernard Rochefort. She graduated from École secondaire Algonquin in North Bay in 1976. She graduated from Laurentian University with a Bachelor of Commerce in 1980 and completed a Master of Business Administration from the University of Ottawa in 2000.

== Political career ==
Rochefort served as the deputy mayor of East Ferris, Ontario from 2014 to 2018 before being elected mayor later in 2018. She was re-elected in 2022. During her tenure, her council oversaw several community projects, including the opening of a new medical office and pharmacy and new municipal offices, and recreational facilities.

In early 2025, Rochefort sought and was acclaimed as the Liberal candidate for the riding of Nipissing—Timiskaming. She won election on April 28, 2025. She resigned as mayor on May 8.

In June 2025, Rochefort was named Parliamentary Secretary to the Secretary of State for Rural Development and was appointed to the Standing Committee on Government Operations and Estimates.

== Personal life ==
Rochefort is married to Ronald Roy. She is a cousin of Bernard Grandmaître, a former member of Provincial Parliament for Ottawa East.

== Electoral record ==
2025 Canadian federal election: Nipissing—Timiskaming
Party	Candidate	Votes	%	±%	Expenditures
Liberal	Pauline Rochefort	27,674	46.99	+10.13	
Conservative	Garry Keller	26,121	44.80	+12.92	
New Democratic	Valerie Kennedy	3,548	6.09	–17.24	
People's	John Janssen	648	1.11	–6.82	
Green	Louise Poitras	578	1.00	N/A	
Total valid votes/expense limit					
Total rejected ballots					
Turnout		58,576	68.04		
Eligible voters		84,549			
Liberal notional hold		Swing		–1.40	
Source: Elections Canada
