= Ralph Brunet =

Canadian politician

Ottawa Alderman Serving with Jules Morin (1963; 1965–1972) and Cecile O'Regan (1963–1964)
- In office 1963–1972
- Preceded by: Clem Aubin
- Succeeded by: Jules Morin
- Constituency: By Ward

Personal details
- Born: 1910
- Died: November 7, 1973 (aged 63)
- Spouse: Georgette Ranger (m. 1941)
- Children: 4

J. Raphaël "Ralph" Brunet (1910–November 17, 1973) was a Canadian politician. He served as an alderman on Ottawa City Council from 1963 to 1972, representing By Ward. He was known to speak little at council meetings, but was "highly regarded" by ward residents and for "getting things done". He promoted the integrity of the city's Byward Market, the use of the French language in municipal affairs, and securing of recreation facilities for young people.

== Early life ==
Brunet was the son of Marie Louise (née Renaud) from Saint-Clet, Quebec and Francois d'Assise Brunet, from St. Albert, Ontario. At the time of Brunet's birth, his father worked as a general merchant in Moose Creek, Ontario. Brunet was known locally as an avid sportsman, having played as a defenceman in a local ice hockey league. He worked as an assistant foreman mason with the Department of Public Works. He was also a district deputy grand knight of the Knights of Columbus, vice president of La Salle Academy alumni, vice president of the Notre Dame Recreation Centre, and director of the Patro Boys' Club.

== Aldermanic career ==
He ran for public office for the first time in the 1962 municipal election, running in By Ward. He made the announcement in mid-October of that year. On election day, he was elected in the two-seat ward, winning 2,952 votes, second place behind council dean Jules Morin, and over 700 votes ahead of the other incumbent, Clem Aubin, his brother-in-law, who lost his seat as a result. His stated priorities upon election included improving streets and sidewalks in Lowertown.

Upon taking his seat on council, Brunet became a member of the council's Youth Services Board. Later in the year, he joined the Traffic committee. He also served on the children's aid, air pollution and travels committees.

In early November 1964, Brunet announced he was running for re-election in the 1964 municipal election. By the time of the election, he was also a member of the Saint-Jean-Baptiste Society. He ran on a platform of beautification of the Byward Market, more government buildings on Sussex Drive, and more bilingual signage. On election day, Brunet was re-elected winning By Ward's second seat again, picking up 3,805 votes, nearly 2,000 votes ahead of Aubin, who was attempting to win his old seat back.

For the 1965–66 council, Brunet retained his membership on the youth services bureau committee and the traffic committee. In March 1965, he was elected chairman of the pollution committee.

Brunet ran for re-election in the 1966 municipal election. In campaigning, he touted the widening of King Edward Avenue and the renovation of the Byward Market buildings, street construction and repairs in the area as his accomplishments. On election day, he was re-elected once again to the ward's second seat with 3,454 votes, about 1,700 votes ahead of third-place finisher Hubert Plouffe.

In early November 1969, Brunet announced his intention to run for re-election to a fourth term of office in the 1969 municipal election. During his campaign, he expressed concern for urban renewal plans in Sandy Hill and improvements to the Byward Market. He supported reducing the size of the city council, and called for rapid transit, more playground facilities, orderly centralization of essential services, and a review of the zoning by-law. On election day, he was once again re-elected to By Ward's second seat, winning 2,518 votes, around 1,400 more than the third place candidate, Andre Gratton.

Brunet was once again a member of the city's traffic committee for the 1970–72 council. During the term he voted against decreasing the size of council, despite supporting the idea during the previous campaign. In 1972, he was named chairman of the city's traffic committee.

On November 10, 1972, Brunet announced he was not running for re-election in the 1972 municipal election, citing his health and the number of candidates in the race as reasons.

== Death and legacy ==
After retiring, Brunet became ill and died at hospital a year later, on November 17, 1973. He was interred at the Notre-Dame Cemetery.

In 1979, city council voted to name a park in Lowertown after him. After accidentally naming it "Rodolph Brunet Park", it was corrected to "Raphael Brunet Park".

== Personal life ==
Brunet was married to Georgette Ranger, and had four children. Georgette served on the executive of the La Salle Academy Ladies' Auxiliary and was a member of the Federation of French Canadian Women, and the General Hospital Women's Auxiliary. The family summered at a family cottage on Trout Lake in Quebec.
