= Robert Laurier =

Canadian politician

MPP for Ottawa East
- In office November 27, 1940 – March 24, 1945
- Preceded by: Paul Leduc
- Succeeded by: Aurèle Chartrand

Personal details
- Born: March 31, 1892 Arthabaska, Quebec, Canada
- Died: April 4, 1967 (aged 75) Montreal, Quebec
- Party: Liberal Party of Ontario

Robert Laurier (March 31, 1892 – April 4, 1967) was a Canadian barrister and political figure in Ontario, Canada. He represented Ottawa East in the Legislative Assembly of Ontario as a Liberal member from 1940 to 1945.

He was born in Arthabaska, Quebec, the son of Henri Laurier, and was educated at Loyola College, McGill College and Osgoode Hall. He married Gabrielle Parent, the daughter of Simon-Napoléon Parent who was a premier of Quebec and mayor of Quebec City. Laurier served as Minister of Mines in the provincial cabinet from 1940 to 1943. He died after a long illness in 1967

He was the nephew of Sir Wilfrid Laurier.
