= Killing of Sammy Yatim =

Police shooting

Death of Sammy Yatim
- Yatim (left) standing near the front of the streetcar before being shot by Forcillo (right)
- Date: July 27, 2013
- Time: Just after 12:00AM
- Location: Dundas Street and Bellwoods Avenue, Toronto, Ontario, Canada; 43°39′03.3″N 079°24′46″W
- Participants: Constable James Forcillo (shooter)
- Deaths: Sammy Yatim
- Charges: Second degree murder Attempted murder
- Convictions: Attempted murder
- Sentence: 6 years in prison, paroled after serving 2 years
- Litigation: $8-million lawsuit filed against Toronto Police Service by Sammy Yatim's family

The death of Sammy Yatim occurred early in the morning of July 27, 2013, in Toronto, Ontario, Canada. Yatim, an 18-year-old Toronto male armed with a switchblade knife, was shot at nine times, and was hit by eight of the shots fired by 30-year-old Toronto Police Service (TPS) Constable James Forcillo. After being shot, while lying on the floor of the streetcar he was tasered. He later died from the injuries. The incident occurred after Yatim, brandishing a 12 cm (4.7 in) switchblade knife in a Toronto streetcar, advanced on a passenger, threatened other passengers, and exposed himself. The confrontation between Yatim and the police was recorded and footage of it was released publicly, prompting strong reactions across Canada.

On August 19, 2013, Forcillo was charged with second-degree murder. On July 30, 2014, he was also charged with attempted murder. On January 25, 2016, he was found not guilty of second-degree murder and manslaughter, but guilty of attempted murder. On July 28, he was sentenced to six years in prison. The next day, he was granted bail pending an appeal of the court's sentence. His appeal was denied and he was granted parole after serving 2 years in prison. This incident was the only time an on-duty Ontario officer was charged and convicted in the death of a person since the inception of the Special Investigations Unit (SIU) in 1990.

== Shooting ==
At 10:30 pm on July 26, Sammy Yatim boarded a Toronto subway train and transferred to a streetcar on route 505 Dundas around 11:45 pm. Sometime afterwards, he drew his 12 cm (4.7 in) switchblade knife, approached a passenger, and told other passengers to remain on the streetcar, reportedly acting aggressively towards other passengers. Frightened, the passengers promptly tried to escape. Yatim then revised his demands, ordering everyone off the streetcar. He began to approach the driver of the vehicle but stopped to shout obscenities at the crowd gathering outside. The driver of the streetcar remained at the controls until shortly before police arrived.

A passenger and witness said that upon boarding the streetcar he initially noticed Yatim sitting at the back, across from a group of teenage girls. He later heard giggling from the back of the streetcar followed by a scream, then saw Yatim brandishing a knife as the girls ran past him toward the front doors. According to two other witnesses, Yatim seemed irate, mentally unstable, and oblivious to others' presence, holding his exposed genitals in one hand and a knife in the other.

Police arrived at the scene. At the front of the vehicle, Constable James Forcillo of the Toronto Police Service called for a Taser, believing the situation "could be contained". According to videos of the incident, police ordered Yatim to drop the knife several times and warned him not to "take one step in this direction". After Yatim started advancing from the middle towards the front of the streetcar, Forcillo fired three shots, forcing Yatim to the ground. Forcillo claimed Yatim started to get up several seconds later but subsequent autopsy showed the initial volley had severed Yatim's spine, rendering him immobile and unable to get up. Forcillo fired six more shots. Approximately 30 seconds later, Forcillo's Sergeant, Dan Pravica tasered Yatim.

It was later determined that eight of the nine shots fired hit Yatim, and the initial salvo of three shots had killed Yatim almost instantly. Surveillance video indicates that Yatim was lying on the deck when the last six shots were fired.

Yatim was transported and later pronounced dead at St. Michael's Hospital.

== Backgrounds ==
=== James Forcillo ===
James Forcillo was born December 30, 1982, in Montreal, Quebec. He was a constable with six years on the force at the time of the shooting. He graduated from a justice program at East Los Angeles College in Monterey Park, California, United States, and received a psychology degree from York University in Toronto. He worked as a security guard in Toronto, and then was employed as a court services officer for three years. Up until Yatim's death, he worked as a patrol officer for three years.

=== Sammy Yatim ===
Sammy Adib Yatim was born on November 5, 1994, in Aleppo, Syria. He emigrated to Toronto from Aleppo, Syria, with his family in 2008. He had recently graduated from Brebeuf College School in North York, Toronto and had told a friend he intended to focus on his education.

It is unclear what provoked Yatim's behaviour the night he was shot. His family said that he had no history of mental illness or violence. He had "moderate to moderately high levels of ecstasy in his system at the time" of his death, according to the autopsy report.

== Aftermath ==
In July 2014, an $8-million lawsuit was filed against Toronto Police Service by Yatim's family. The shooting and subsequent investigation and trial raised questions about police accountability in Toronto.

== SIU response and criminal trial ==
As the event was recorded on cellphone camera and posted on YouTube by Markus Grupp and Martin Baron, it received international coverage and attention as a potential use of excessive force by the Toronto Police. It also triggered protests, with one temporarily blocking traffic on Dundas street downtown.

On August 8, the Ontario Ombudsman, André Marin, launched a review of police tactics for defusing heated situations, in the wake of public outcry over Yatim's death. The decision was criticized by the Toronto Police Association as a grandstanding political move, and the review as too vague in its goals.

=== Internal review ===
On August 12, former Toronto police chief Bill Blair announced he had enlisted former Associate Chief Justice of Ontario, Dennis O'Connor, to conduct an internal review of the use of force by police, and recommend ways police can better respond to situations involving the mentally unstable. On August 28, however, O'Connor withdrew from the police probe due to a potential conflict of interest.

There is no known investigation into the use of the Taser in the incident or into videos which allegedly show a police officer kicking shell casings inside the yellow police tape at the scene of the shooting.

=== Arrest ===
On August 19, the Ontario Special Investigations Unit (SIU) announced that an arrest warrant had been issued for Forcillo. He was charged with second-degree murder. Forcillo surrendered on August 20. If convicted, the minimum sentence is life imprisonment without parole eligibility for at least ten years.

Free on $510,000 bail, Forcillo was not required to appear at the next stage of his preliminary hearing on December 11. Toronto police stayed a disciplinary charge of discreditable conduct under the Ontario Police Services Act until the criminal trial has finished. Despite this, Forcillo returned to work, but he did not have a firearm nor did he wear a TPS uniform. Michael McCormack responded by saying "the situation is not unusual for officers who have been suspended."

On June 17, 2014, the preliminary inquiry ended with judge Richard LeDressay ordering Forcillo to stand trial in 2015. Evidence presented in the inquiry is under a publication ban. Forcillo continued to serve as a Toronto Crime Stoppers administrator.

On July 30, 2014, Crown prosecutors added the charge of attempted murder "by shooting [Yatim] with a firearm and thereby wounding him." Legal experts said the second charge was a highly unusual strategy.

=== Trial ===
Lawyers on both sides of Forcillo's trial began making pre-trial motions in the Toronto Courthouse on September 14, 2015. Jury selection began on September 30, 2015.

==== Prosecution ====
During the trial, presided over by Justice Edward Then, the prosecution put forward the theory that Forcillo had over-reacted and "lost his cool" in his decision to fire at Yatim. A former police chief testifying as a use of force expert said he believed Yatim provided no imminent threat requiring the use of deadly force by Forcillo. In cross examination, the prosecution asked Forcillo why he had not put more effort into de-escalating the situation to avoid violence. Forcillo responded that pulling out his firearm in response to Yatim's knife was "a form of de-escalation".

==== Defence ====
Forcillo argued that he was acting in self-defence both times he fired his weapon. In testifying in his own defense, Forcillo explained that he followed standard police procedure, and believed Yatim to be a threat when he repeatedly ignored his orders to "drop the knife" and instead proceeded to advance towards him. In support of the defense, a police college instructor testified that Forcillo was out of options the night he shot Yatim. Passengers on the streetcar also testified their experiences of fear, terror and chaos when Yatim threatened them with his knife.

==== Verdict and sentence ====
On January 25, 2016, the jury found Forcillo not guilty of second degree murder and manslaughter, but guilty of attempted murder. The jury accepted the defence's argument that Forcillo was justified in firing the first three shots, but found him not justified in the second round of shots, thus guilty of attempted murder. The verdict meant Forcillo faced a four-year minimum sentence.

Forcillo challenged the minimum sentence law and his conviction, in arguments heard in May 2016. After the defence was granted a postponement to prepare on May 16, the legal challenge began May 18, expected to last two or three days, followed by the sentencing hearing over another two. The defence sought house arrest, and the Crown sought eight to ten years in prison. The hearing concluded on May 26, and on July 28, 2016, Forcillo was sentenced to six years in prison. The TPS also suspended him without pay.

=== Appeal and bail ===
After one night in jail, Forcillo was granted bail pending an appeal of the court's decision to the Court of Appeal for Ontario. His lawyers were ordered to provide the court with an update on this process by November 9. Forcillo's bail conditions required him to stay at the home of his then-wife and her parents. Because Forcillo was deemed unlikely to commit further offences, his bail was extended in November 2016.

In early November 2017, Forcillo applied for his bail to be modified so he could live with his new fiancée instead of at the home of his now ex-wife, and have his new fiancée added as a surety. Two days before the hearing for the bail modification was to be heard, provincial investigators found Forcillo at the residence of his fiancée in violation of his bail conditions. Forcillo was arrested the next day and charged with failing to comply with his recognizance, which has a maximum sentence of two years imprisonment. The attorney general filed an application with the Court of Appeal to revoke Forcillo's bail. Forcillo's bail hearing for the charge of failing to comply with his bail conditions was delayed pending the result of the application to revoke his bail, which was scheduled to be heard in court on November 30. In the meantime, Forcillo was remanded in custody and was in protective custody because he is a police officer. The Court of Appeal for Ontario subsequently dismissed Forcillo's appeal on April 30, 2018, and upheld the original trial-imposed six-year sentence.

On December 6, 2018, the Supreme Court of Canada denied Forcillo's application for leave to appeal his conviction.

=== New charges ===
In November 2017, Forcillo was charged with breaching his bail conditions and then in December 2017, also faced one additional obstruction of justice charge related to allegedly committing perjury when signing an affidavit under oath. The affidavit had been filed in court when Forcillo was seeking a variance in his bail terms and was awaiting a hearing to address the variance request when he was found to be living in violation of his current bail terms by police investigators in November. According to documents filed with the court, Forcillo is alleged to have made "false statements under oath" when he stated in the affidavit that he was in full compliance with the terms of his bail and related house arrest. Forcillo was scheduled to appear in court on December 29.

On December 29, 2017, Forcillo attended a bail hearing on the new charges of obstructing and perjury relating to his allegedly lying under oath in the signing of his affidavit. Again, his bail was revoked.

In August 2019, Forcillo was granted day parole after serving 21 months of his six-year sentence. He was granted full parole on January 17, 2020.
