= Forcillo =

Forcillo ([forˈtʃillo]) is an Italian surname. Notable people with the surname include:

- James Forcillo (born 1982), police officer convicted in the death of Sammy Yatim
- Sammy Forcillo (1950–2026), Canadian politician
