= Nathalie Des Rosiers =

Canadian lawyer, academic and politician

The Honourable Nathalie Des Rosiers CM OOnt ECO
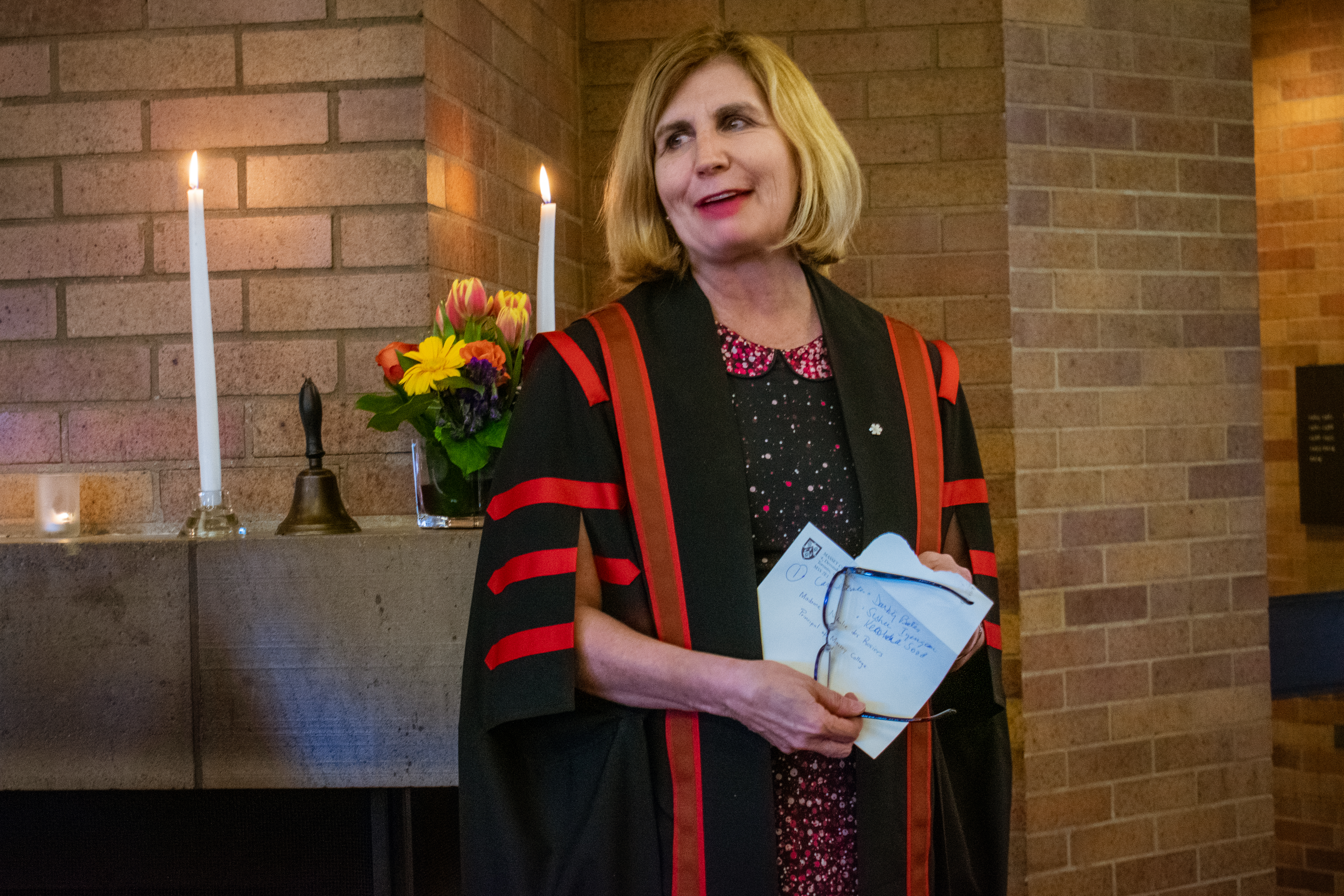
- Des Rosiers as Principal of Massey College in 2020

6th Principal of Massey College
- In office August 1, 2019 – January 15, 2024
- Preceded by: Hugh Segal
- Succeeded by: Jonathan Rose (acting); James Orbinski

Minister of Natural Resources and Forestry
- In office January 17, 2018 – June 29, 2018
- Premier: Kathleen Wynne
- Preceded by: Kathryn McGarry
- Succeeded by: Jeff Yurek

Member of the Ontario Provincial Parliament for Ottawa—Vanier
- In office November 17, 2016 – July 31, 2019
- Preceded by: Madeleine Meilleur
- Succeeded by: Lucille Collard

Personal details
- Born: 1959 (age 66–67) Montreal, Quebec, Canada
- Party: Liberal
- Education: Université de Montréal (LLB); Harvard University (LLM)
- Occupation: Lawyer

Nathalie Des Rosiers (born 1959) is a Canadian judge, lawyer, academic and former politician in Ontario, Canada. She was the sixth Principal of Massey College at the University of Toronto. She was a Liberal member of the Legislative Assembly of Ontario representing the riding of Ottawa—Vanier from 2016 to 2019. During her tenure as a Member of Provincial Parliament, Des Rosiers served in the cabinet of Kathleen Wynne as Minister of Natural Resources and Forestry. On December 18, 2023, she was appointed as a judge of the Ontario Superior Court of Justice in Toronto.

== Background ==
She was born in Montreal, studied law at the Université de Montréal and received a LLM from Harvard University. Des Rosiers clerked at the Supreme Court of Canada and practised law in London, Ontario, with Lerners LLP. She also was a law professor at the University of Western Ontario. She then served as dean of the civil law section at the University of Ottawa. She was president of the Law Commission of Canada from 2004 to 2008. Des Rosiers served as general counsel for the Canadian Civil Liberties Association (CCLA) from 2009 to 2013, when she returned to serve as dean of the common law section at the University of Ottawa until 2016.

During the 2010 G20 Toronto summit, Des Rosiers uncovered a provision invoked by the provincial government which greatly expanded police powers near a security fence on the perimeter of the summit's location. She brought this issue to the attention of the Canadian press and ensured that CCLA volunteers monitored the Toronto police for civil liberties violations during the conference. She also helped to discourage the practice of "carding", where police stop people who are not suspected of any criminal activity, ask for their identification and record that information for later review.

=== Honours ===
Des Rosiers was inducted into the Order of Ontario in 2012, and was inducted as a Member of the Order of Canada in 2013 for her work in civil rights and Francophone advocacy, and was accepted as a Fellow of the Royal Society of Canada in 2014. She was named one of Canada's 10 "nation builders" by the Globe and Mail in 2014 and was named one of Canada's 25 most influential lawyers by Canadian Lawyer in 2011 and in 2012.

== Politics ==
She was chosen as Liberal candidate for a November 2016 by-election to be held in the Ontario riding of Ottawa—Vanier following the resignation of Madeleine Meilleur. In that by-election she defeated Progressive Conservative challenger and former Ontario ombudsman Andre Marin.

Des Rosiers served as Parliamentary Assistant to the Minister of Energy and Parliamentary Assistant to the Minister of Intergovernmental Affairs. She was later appointed Minister of Natural Resources and Forestry. She was re-elected in the 2018 general election.

She announced on May 16, 2019, that she would resign her seat in the legislature to become principal of Massey College at the University of Toronto effective August 1, 2019.

== Election results ==
2018 Ontario general election: Ottawa—Vanier
Party	Candidate	Votes	%	±%
Liberal	Nathalie Des Rosiers	20,555	42.86	−12.30
New Democratic	Lyra Evans	14,232	29.68	+16.56
Progressive Conservative	Fadi Nemr	10,252	21.38	−1.64
Green	Sheilagh McLean	1,955	4.08	–3.73
None of the Above	Keegan Bennett	413	0.86	N/A
Libertarian	Ken Lewis	332	0.69	N/A
Freedom	David McGruer	219	0.46	N/A
Total valid votes		47,958	98.80	
Total rejected ballots		581	1.20	
Turnout		48,539	51.47	
Eligible voters		94,298		
Liberal hold		Swing		-14.43
Source: Elections Ontario

Ontario provincial by-election, November 17, 2016: Ottawa—Vanier Resignation of Madeleine Meilleur
Party	Candidate	Votes	%	±%
Liberal	Nathalie Des Rosiers	14,979	49.19	-6.37
Progressive Conservative	André Marin	9,051	29.72	+7.43
New Democratic	Claude Bisson	4,459	14.64	+1.33
Green	Raphaël Morin	993	3.26	-4.75
Stop the New Sex-Ed Agenda	Elizabeth de Viel Castel	384	1.26	
Libertarian	Dean T. Harris	177	0.58	-0.26
None of the Above	Above Znoneofthe	164	0.54	
Canadian Constituents'	Stephanie McEvoy	74	0.24	
People's Political Party	Kevin Clarke	73	0.24	
Freedom	David McGruer	52	0.17	
Pauper	John Turmel	48	0.16	
Total valid votes		30,454	99.50	
Total rejected ballots		153	0.50	-0.80
Turnout		30,607	37.36	-11.49
Eligible voters		81,902		
Liberal hold		Swing		-6.90
Source(s) Elections Ontario

=== Cabinet positions ===
Wynne ministry, Province of Ontario (2013–2018)
Cabinet post (1)
Predecessor	Office	Successor
Kathryn McGarry	Minister of Natural Resources and Forestry; 2018 (January–June)	Jeff Yurek
