= Cecile O'Regan =

Canadian politician (1891–1979)

Ottawa Alderman Serving with Charlie St. Germain
- In office March 30, 1960 – December 31, 1962
- Preceded by: May Nickson
- Succeeded by: David Dehler
- Constituency: St. George's Ward

Serving with Ralph Brunet
- In office June 3, 1963 – December 31, 1964
- Preceded by: Jules Morin
- Succeeded by: Jules Morin
- Constituency: By Ward

Serving with Charlie St. Germain
- In office January 1, 1964 – December 31, 1966
- Preceded by: David Dehler
- Succeeded by: Rhéal Robert
- Constituency: St. George's Ward

Personal details
- Born: March 15, 1891 Montreal, Quebec
- Died: February 8, 1979 (aged 87) Ottawa
- Party: Liberal Party of Canada
- Spouse: William Thomas O'Regan (m. 1911; died 1954)
- Children: 3
- Profession: Housewife

Cecile O'Regan (née Gauthier; March 15, 1891 – February 8, 1979) was a Canadian politician. She served as an alderman on Ottawa City Council from 1960 to 1962 and from 1963 to 1966. She was the second woman to sit as an alderman on council. Known for her colourfulness, she was active in Liberal Party circles, including a stint as president of the National Federation of Liberal Women. She was also known for her volunteer work, especially with St. Vincent Hospital.

== Early life ==
O'Regan was born in Montreal, in 1891, the daughter of Cordélia Désy and Pierre Gauthier. She moved to Ottawa at the age of 12. She was educated at the Notre Dame Convents in both cities.

O'Regan had many volunteer positions during her life. Within the Liberal Party, she was secretary and executive of the Eastern Ontario Liberal Association, Vice President of the Ontario Liberal Association, vice president, at large, of the Ontario Women's Liberal Association, president of the Ontario Liberal Women's Association, president and founder of the Lady Laurier Club of East Ottawa.

Outside of politics, she was the president of the Sacred Heart branch of the Federation of French-Canadian Women, president of St. Vincent de Paul's Ladies Auxiliary, and president of Jeanne d'Arc Institute.

== 1936 federal by-election ==
O'Regan ran for a seat in the Canadian House of Commons in a by-election in 1936 in the riding of Ottawa East as an Independent Liberal. She ran on the slogan, "[m]ay the best man win, and a woman lead him". She won 1,849 votes, nearly 8,000 votes behind the winner, Joseph Albert Pinard. O'Regan decided to run for the seat after losing the Liberal nomination to Pinard. In the nomination meeting, O'Regan won 1,100 votes to Pinard's 2,149 on the first ballot, finishing third, and was eliminated. Following the vote, O'Regan was "satisfied that the convention verdict was not the choice of the electors", and declared there was "uncertainty as to the legality of the convention". She claimed that "there were so many outsiders [who] voted that it was quite impossible to say there was any winner. The convention was poorly organized". It was the first time a woman ran for federal office in the city, and she was the first French Canadian woman to run for the House of Commons.

== National Federation of Liberal Women presidency ==
In 1950, O'Regan was elected president of the National Federation of Liberal Women (now known as the National Women's Liberal Commission), replacing Nancy Hodges. She held that position until 1952, when Mrs. C. J. Embree was elected.

== Municipal politics ==
Also in 1950, O'Regan spoke on behalf of the candidacy of Charlotte Whitton, who was running for a spot on Ottawa's Board of Control in the 1950 municipal election. Whitton and O'Regan had a close friendship despite their political differences.

In 1955, she was elected the president of the St. Vincent's Hospital Women's Auxiliary.

O'Regan ran for municipal office for the first time in the 1956 municipal elections, attempting to become the first grandmother elected to city council. Running in St. George's Ward, she placed last, winning 1,240 votes, over 500 behind second place May Nickson in the two-seat ward.

In 1958, she was elected vice president of the Ontario Liberal Women's Association.

=== 1960–1962 ===
On March 28, 1960, O'Regan was elected by city council to fill the vacancy in St. George's Ward following the resignation of May Nickson who was moving to Canberra, Australia. She defeated four male candidates for the job. Following her appointment, O'Regan was the only woman on city council. At the time of her election, she was president of the District 10 Ontario Hospital Ladies' Auxiliary, and the Alumni Association of Notre Dame Convent. After her appointment, O'Regan was placed on the city's Air Pollution Control Committee. In June, she was appointed to the Ottawa Housing Standards Board.

O'Regan was elected to city council by the voters for the first time in the 1960 municipal election, winning 3,025 votes in St. George's Ward, finishing second in the two-seat ward. She won over 1,000 more votes than the third-place finisher, Sam McLean. She was one of two women elected to city council in that election, along with Ellen Webber. Following her election, she was reappointed to the Housing Standards Board, and the Signs Committee, and was appointed to the Committee on Train Speeds.

In June 1961, she was elected president of the Ladies' Auxiliary of the St. Vincent Hospital. At the end of the year, she was appointed to council's Emergency Measures Committee. During the 1961–62 term she did not miss a single council session. During the term, she was also a member of the council publicity committee, and the committee of Island Lodge.

O'Regan ran for re-election in the 1962 municipal election, running on a platform of more hospitals and a home for the aged. On election day, she lost her seat, finishing just 188 votes behind second place David Dehler. After her defeat, she stated she would not run again.

=== 1963–1966 ===
O'Regan didn't stay off council for too long, as she was once again appointed to the body in 1963. She defeated former alderman Clem Aubin among a vote of council members to fill the By Ward seat, which had been vacated by Jules Morin, who had been appointed to the city's Board of Control. Following her appointment, she was selected to be on the city's Tourist and Convention Bureau Committee. As a member of the committee, she pushed for the city to fund the entertainment of visitors. In 1964, she called on the city's Board of Control to investigate care given to children in the city's foster homes, which she thought was inadequate. She had stated that the Children's Aid Society (CAS) had been putting children into homes and were being neglected, and had personal knowledge that children had been "sleeping on cellar floors". The director of the CAS was 'disgusted' by her remarks, and told her to 'put up or shut up' in regards to her charges. She later revealed one of the reasons for her push was after hearing of a three-year old who starved to death in the city, but that she would be arrested if she had done anything about it. She said that mayor Charlotte Whitton told her to "keep out of child-welfare matters".

Despite indicating a desire to not run for election again, O'Regan floated rumours she would seek a spot on Ottawa's Board of Control for the 1964 municipal election. She later reconsidered, and in late October she announced she would run for re-election in her home ward St. George's which she had previously represented, rather than in By Ward. On election day, she won her old seat back, squeaking in with 2,155 votes in the two-seat ward, 82 votes ahead of the third place candidate, Rhéal Robert.

In March 1965, she was appointed vice chairman of the city's air pollution committee. A year later, the committee elected her to head its investigations into pollution in the city's atmosphere for the year. She was named chairman of the committee in March 1966. During the 1965–66 council, she brought forward a motion to council to press for the purchase of bilingual stationary and city forms.

In early November 1966, O'Regan announced her intention to run for re-election in the 1966 municipal elections. On election day, she went down to defeat, with Rhéal Robert finishing second in the ward, over 800 votes ahead of the 1,919 that O'Regan won.

=== After defeat ===
In 1968, when Wellington Ward became vacant following the death of Lionel O'Connor, O'Regan was one of the candidates considered by council to replace him. They ended up selecting Lorry Greenberg instead.

== Personal life ==
O'Regan attended St. Joseph's and Sacred Heart churches. She was married to W. T. O'Regan, an Irishman from Nova Scotia.

She died in 1979 after a two-month stay at the Montfort Hospital. She was buried in the Notre Dame Cemetery.
