= Forbes, Ottawa =

Forbes
- Neighbourhood
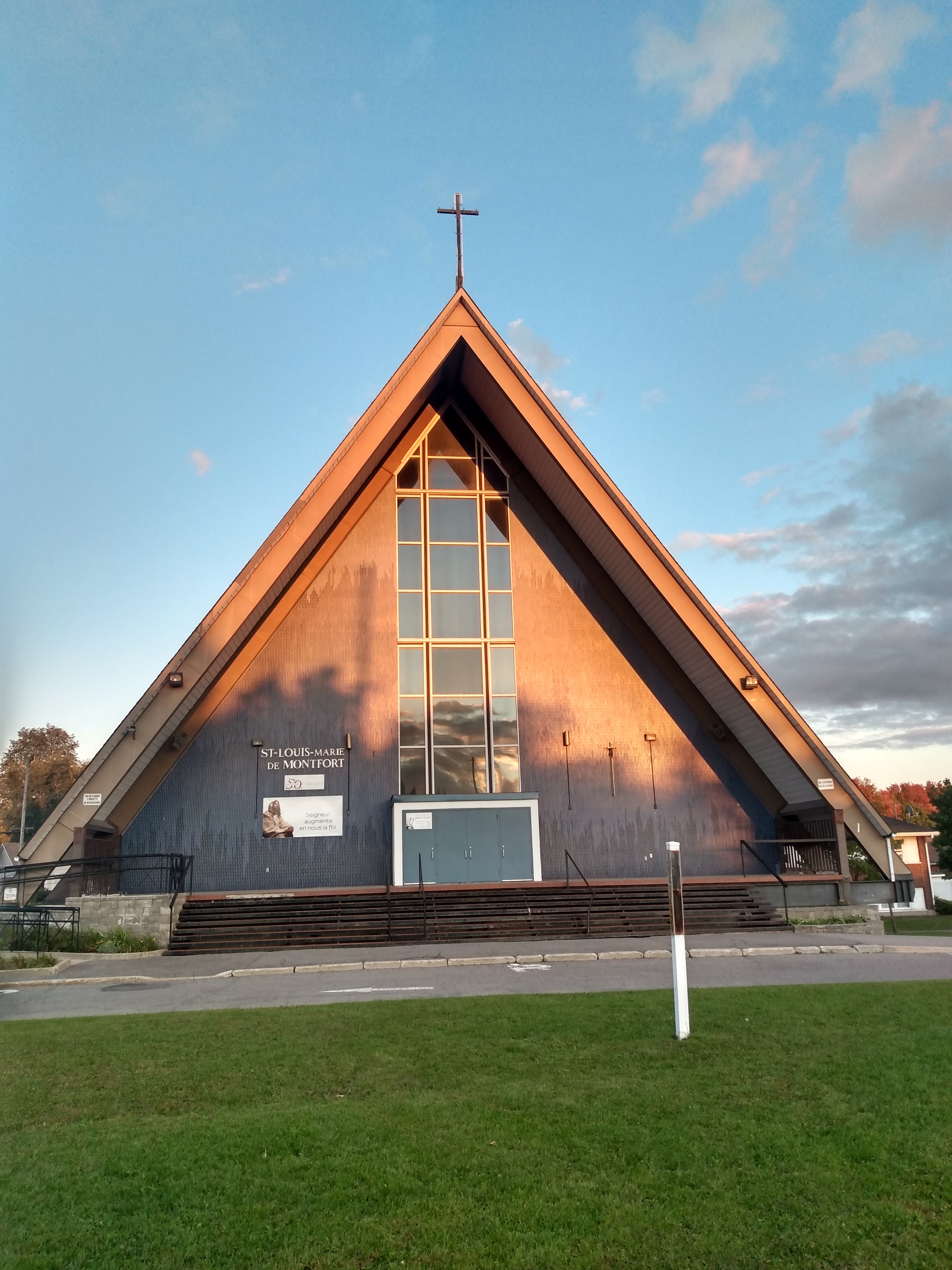
- St-Louis-Marie de Montfort Parish

- Location within Ottawa
- Coordinates: 45°26′15″N 75°38′20″W
- Country: Canada
- Province: Ontario
- City: Ottawa

Government
  - MPs: Mona Fortier
  - MPPs: Lucille Collard
  - Councillors: Rawlson King

Area
  - Total: 0.841 km^{2} (0.325 sq mi)
- Elevation: 75 m (246 ft)

Population (Canada 2016 Census)
  - Total: 2,918
  - Density: 3,470/km^{2} (8,990/sq mi)
- Time zone: Eastern (EST)
- Forward sortation area: K1K

Forbes is a neighbourhood in Rideau-Rockcliffe Ward in the east end of Ottawa, Ontario, Canada.

It is defined by the city as being bounded on the North by Montreal Road, on the east by the Aviation Parkway, on the west and south by the former municipal boundary of the city, and on the southwest by McArthur Avenue. However, the area west of St. Laurent Boulevard is part of the Overbrook Community Association, and most maps show Forbes as being east of St. Laurent. The total population of the neighbourhood (east of St. Laurent) was 2,918 according to the Canada 2016 Census.

Much of the neighbourhood was built in the 1950s and 1960s.

The neighbourhood is home to Helen Redpath Thompson Park, Trojan Park and Forbes Park as well as the former Rideau High School.
