= Bernard Grandmaître =

Canadian politician (1933–2025)

The Honourable Ben Grandmaître CM ECO
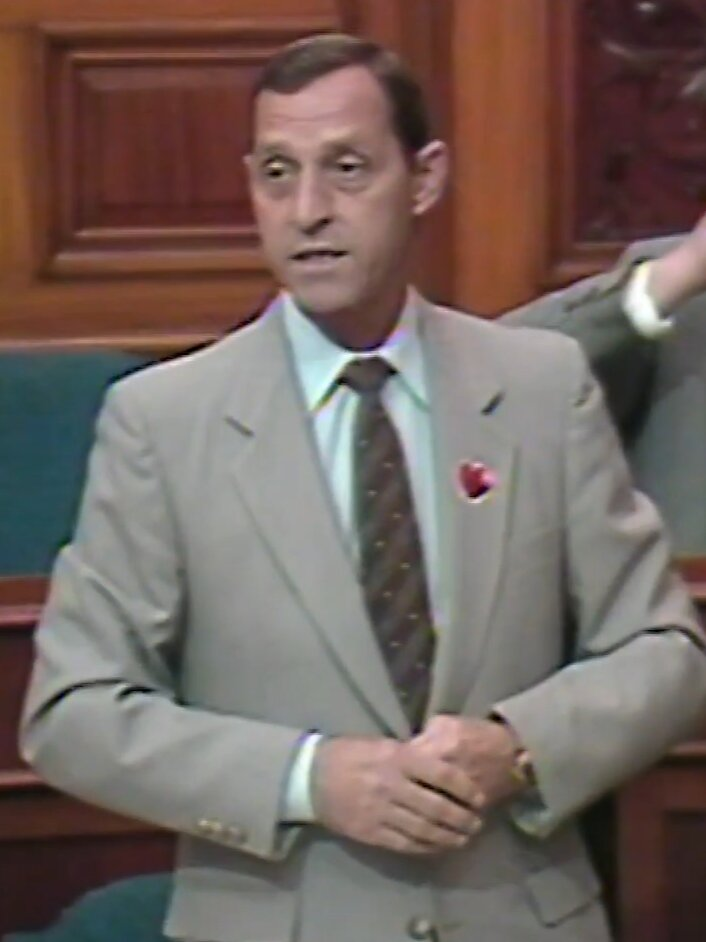
- Grandmaître in 1986

Ontario MPP
- In office 1984–1999
- Preceded by: Albert Roy
- Succeeded by: Claudette Boyer
- Constituency: Ottawa East

Mayor of Vanier
- In office 1974–1980
- Preceded by: Gérard Grandmaître
- Succeeded by: Wilfrid Champagne
- In office 1982–1984
- Preceded by: Wilfrid Champagne
- Succeeded by: Gisèle Lalonde

Personal details
- Born: June 24, 1933 Eastview, Ontario, Canada
- Died: October 28, 2025 (aged 92) Ottawa, Ontario, Canada
- Party: Liberal
- Relations: Pauline Rochefort (cousin)

Bernard C. Grandmaître, CM (June 24, 1933 – October 28, 2025) was a Canadian politician from Ontario. He was a Liberal member of the Legislative Assembly of Ontario from 1984 to 1999 who represented the riding of Ottawa East. He served as a cabinet minister in the government of David Peterson.

== Background ==
Grandmaître was born in Eastview, Ontario, and educated at Ottawa schools. He owned a small business in Vanier, Ontario for 13 years. He was named a life member of the Centre francophone de Vanier, and was active in the Knights of Columbus.

Grandmaître died on October 28, 2025, at the age of 92.

== Politics ==
Grandmaître was an alderman on the Vanier city council from 1969 to 1974, and served as its mayor from 1974 to 1980 and from 1982 to 1984.

He ran for the Ontario legislature in the 1981 provincial election, but lost to Bob MacQuarrie in the riding of Carleton East (future NDP cabinet minister Evelyn Gigantes finished third).

=== In government ===
On December 13, 1984, Grandmaître was elected in a by-election to succeed retiring MPP Albert Roy in the riding of Ottawa East. This riding is one of the safest Liberal seats in the province, and Grandmaître was returned without difficulty in the 1985 provincial election.

The Liberals formed a minority government after this election, and Grandmaître was appointed Minister of Municipal Affairs and Minister responsible for Francophone Affairs. In the latter capacity, he played a major role in passing the province's French Language Services Act in 1986.

The Liberals won a landslide majority in the 1987 election, and Grandmaître defeated his nearest opponent by almost 15,000 votes. He was appointed Minister of Revenue on September 29, 1987, while retaining responsibility for Francophone Affairs. His term in cabinet ended on August 2, 1989.

=== Cabinet positions ===
Peterson ministry, Province of Ontario (1985–1990)
Cabinet posts (2)
Predecessor	Office	Successor
Robert Nixon	Minister of Revenue; 1987–1989; Also Responsible for Francophone Affairs	Remo Mancini
Dennis Timbrell	Minister of Municipal Affairs; 1985–1987; Also Responsible for Francophone Affairs	John Eakins

=== In opposition ===
The Liberals were defeated by the NDP in the 1990 election, although Grandmaître again retained his seat without difficulty. He was re-elected again in the 1995 election, and retired in 1999. He endorsed Dalton McGuinty's bid to lead the Ontario Liberal Party in 1996.

=== Electoral record ===
1995 Ontario general election: Ottawa East
Party	Candidate	Votes	%	±%	Expenditures
Liberal	Bernard Grandmaître	14,436	56.94	−5.47	$ 19,824.52
Progressive Conservative	Cynthia Bled	5,368	21.17	+12.77	28,483.15
New Democratic	David Dyment	4,818	19.00	−4.27	17,425.03
Green	Larry Tyldsley	335	1.32	−1.44	524.72
Natural Law	Robert Mayer	261	1.03		0.00
Independent	Steven White	136	0.54		0.00
Total valid votes/expense limit		25,354	98.71		$ 45,818.00
Total rejected ballots		331	1.29	+0.07	
Turnout		25,685	53.21	-2.02	
Eligible voters		48,272			
Liberal hold		Swing		-9.12	
Source(s) "General Election of June 8 1995 – Summary of Valid Ballots by Candidate". "General Election of June 8 1995 – Statistical Summary". Elections Ontario. "1995 Details of Candidate Income and Expenses" (3.16MB). & "1995 Summary of Income and Campaign Expenses" ( Word'95 .doc files (146KB)).

1990 Ontario general election: Ottawa East
Party	Candidate	Votes	%	±%
Liberal	Bernard Grandmaître	16,363	62.41	−11.85
New Democratic	Lori Lucier	6,103	23.28	+7.07
Progressive Conservative	Diana Morin	2,203	8.40	−1.13
Family Coalition	Richard Hudon	826	3.15	
Green	Frank de Jong	723	2.76	
Total valid votes		26,218	98.78	
Total rejected ballots		324	1.22	
Turnout		26,542	55.23	
Eligible voters		48,055		
Liberal hold		Swing		-9.46

1987 Ontario general election: Ottawa East
Party	Candidate	Votes	%	±%
Liberal	Bernard Grandmaître	18,959	74.26	+5.86
New Democratic	Alex Connelly	4,137	16.20	−2.40
Progressive Conservative	Corinne Price	2,435	9.54	−1.03
Total valid votes		25,531	100.0	+19.60

1985 Ontario general election: Ottawa East
Party	Candidate	Votes	%	±%
Liberal	Bernard Grandmaître	14,601	68.40	+0.03
New Democratic	Kathryn Barnard	3,971	18.60	+5.1
Progressive Conservative	Paul St. Georges	2,257	10.57	−6.48
Independent	Serge Girard	518	2.43	+1.35
Total valid votes		21,347	100.0	+88.23

Ontario provincial by-election, December 13, 1984: Ottawa East Resignation of Albert J. Roy
Party	Candidate	Votes	%	±%
Liberal	Bernard Grandmaître	7,754	68.37	−0.85
Progressive Conservative	Richard Boudreau	1,934	17.05	−3.58
New Democratic	Jean Gilbert	1,531	13.50	+4.22
Independent	Serge Girard	122	1.08	+0.21
Total valid votes		11,341	100.0	−44.74

== Honours and awards ==
In 2013 he was made a member of the Order of Canada. His citation reads, "for fostering the vitality and growth of Ontario's Francophone community." There is an arena named after him in Ottawa and a French Catholic school in the Riverside South neighbourhood of Ottawa that bears his name.
