= Albert Roy =

Canadian politician

Ontario MPP
- In office 1971–1984
- Preceded by: Jules Morin
- Succeeded by: Bernard Grandmaître
- Constituency: Ottawa East

Personal details
- Born: February 23, 1939 (age 87) Saskatchewan, Canada
- Party: Liberal
- Occupation: Judge
- Profession: Lawyer

Albert J. Roy (born February 23, 1939) is a jurist and former politician in Ontario, Canada. He served in the Legislative Assembly of Ontario from 1971 to 1984 as a member of the Ontario Liberal Party.

== Background ==
Roy was born in Saskatchewan and educated at the University of Ottawa. He was called to the bar in 1965. He worked as a lawyer before entering political life, and was active in the Association des Jeunes Adultes Franco Ontariens.

== Politics ==
He was elected to the Ontario legislature in the 1971 provincial election, defeating Progressive Conservative incumbent Jules Morin by 5,127 votes in Ottawa East. Roy's election was one of the few significant gains for the Liberals in this campaign, as the party finished a distant second in the legislature against the governing Progressive Conservatives of William Davis.

Roy was re-elected with an increased majority in the 1975 election, in which the Progressive Conservatives were brought down to a minority government. Liberal leader Robert Nixon resigned soon after this election, and Roy entered the race to succeed him. He finished third at the party's 1976 leadership convention, behind Stuart Smith and David Peterson.

He was re-elected in 1977, and 1981. He continued to serve in the legislature until he resigned to run in the 1984 federal election. Roy contested Ottawa—Carleton for the Liberal Party of Canada, and lost to Barry Turner of the Progressive Conservative Party by 3,946 votes. His defeat marked only the second time in one hundred years that the riding of Ottawa—Carleton elected a Progressive Conservative Member of Parliament.

== Later life ==
Roy returned to his legal practice after this loss, and served as chair of the Ottawa-Carleton French Language Association Advisory Committee in 1985 and 1986. He was appointed to the Ontario Superior Court in 1995. He retired in 2014. He is active in the Ottawa Dispute Resolution Group.
