= Carson Meadows =

- Neighbourhood
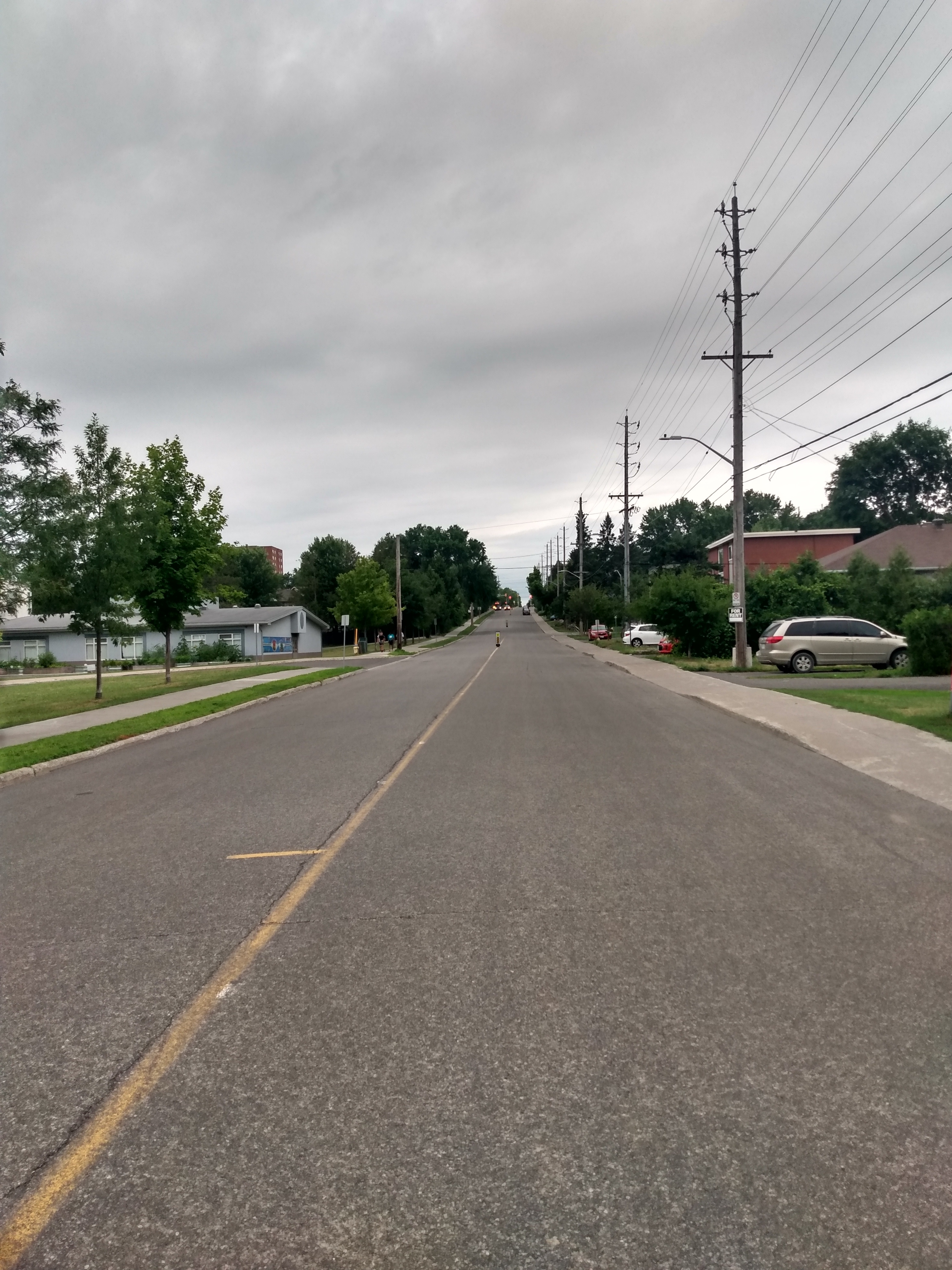
- Carsons Road

- Location within Ottawa
- Coordinates: 45.44369°N 75.62796°W
- Country: Canada
- Province: Ontario
- City: Ottawa
- Establishment of post office: 1871

Government
  - MPs: Mona Fortier
  - MPPs: Lucille Collard
  - Councillors: Rawlson King
- Elevation: 90 m (300 ft)
- Time zone: Eastern (EST)
- Forward sortation area: K1K

Carson Meadows is a neighbourhood in Rideau-Rockcliffe Ward in the east end of Ottawa, Ontario, Canada. It is roughly located south of Montreal Road and north of Collège La Cité, west of the National Research Council National Science Library site, and generally east of Carsons Road. This area has an approximate population of 3300 (2016 Census). The neighbourhood has a plurality Francophone population. The five dissemination areas that cover most of the area together are 40% Francophone and 39% Anglophone. Creole languages are the third largest linguistic group at 6%.

The area was once known as Rockville, with a post office opening up in 1871. The area went through a number of names such as Robillard and Rock Village, with the post office being renamed to Quarries in 1903, and closing in 1961. The area was home to a number of quarries which provided stones for Parliament Buildings among other places in the Ottawa area. The quarries would later be renamed. The "Quarries" name still appears on some maps of the area, as it is recorded under that name by the Geographical Names Data Base.

A subdivision was built in the area in the early 1960s by Mastercraft Homes, and sold by Guaranty Trust Company of Canada. This subdivision was originally called Carson's Meadows. As of 1965, the neighbourhood consisted of a few houses on Hochelaga Street, the Carson Hill Apartments on Carsons Road, and a subdivision between Bermuda Avenue and Charleswood Avenue. Over the next decade, the Summerhill subdivision was built on Bathgate Dr, as well as the Hochelaga Rental Homes, the CrossWinds apartments, Las Brisas apartments and the Carson's Community Ottawa Housing project. By 1991, the Bathgate Court Ottawa Housing project and the Concorde Apartments were built. Over the next decade, the Desloges Cooperative Housing was built.

== Amenities ==
The neighbourhood is home to Bathgate Park, Collège catholique Samuel-Genest and Montfort Catholic Elementary School.
