= May Nickson =

Ottawa Alderman Serving with Charles St. Germain
- In office January 1, 1955 – March 15, 1960
- Preceded by: William Newton
- Succeeded by: Cecile O'Regan
- Constituency: St. George's Ward

Personal details
- Born: May 29, 1918 Ottawa
- Died: June 5, 2010 (aged 92)
- Spouse: Reginald Blair "Rex" Nickson (m. 1948; died 1997)
- Children: 3

Jessie May Nickson, née Shaw (May 29, 1918, in Ottawa – June 5, 2010) was the first woman elected as an alderman on Ottawa City Council (excluding the Board of Control and mayor) serving from 1955 to 1960, representing St. George's Ward.

Nickson was born at the Ottawa Maternity Hospital on May 29, 1918, to J. Grant Shaw, who also served as an Ottawa alderman, and Ethel T. Shaw, who was a Progressive Conservative candidate in the 1958 Canadian federal election.

Nickson graduated in 1940 from Queen's University, Kingston with a Bachelor of Commerce degree. She was a member of the university diving team. Prior to her marriage, she worked as an accountant, economist and statistician, and worked for the Department of Trade and Commerce. During World War II, she served with the Red Cross.

Nickson was first elected to council in the 1954 Ottawa municipal election, winning the second spot for Ward 3, along with Charles St. Germain who won the most votes. She was re-elected in the 1956 and 1958 municipal elections.

On council, she fought for better representation for women in city jobs and civic boards and committee, and to get fluoride in the drinking water. She was a member of the Tourist and Convention Bureau and was on the Board of the Children's Aid Society. She was also a member of the Society for Retarded Children, and Neighbourhood Services. She had to resign her seat in 1960 when her husband was named commercial secretary for Canada in Canberra, Australia. While in Australia, she golfed, winning several tournaments. Her family returned to Canada in 1964 and she then worked for Statistics Canada.

In retirement, she learned Spanish and volunteered with development agencies, which included time in Costa Rica and India. She also volunteered with the National Council of Women.

Her husband Rex Nickson died in 1997. She was diagnosed with ALS at the age of 89. After losing her voice due to ALS, she learned to use a speech generating device.

In addition to diving and golf, she also enjoyed bridge, water skiing and swimming at her family cottage on Danford Lake. She had three children.

May Nickson Place, a 12-story apartment building in downtown Ottawa, at 340 Gloucester Street, was named in her honour by Ottawa Community Housing Corporation.
