= Claudette Boyer =

Canadian politician

Ontario MPP
- In office 1999–2003
- Preceded by: Bernard Grandmaître
- Succeeded by: Madeleine Meilleur
- Constituency: Ottawa—Vanier

Personal details
- Born: Claudette Poirier; January 9, 1938 Ottawa, Ontario
- Died: February 16, 2013 (aged 75) Ottawa, Ontario
- Party: Liberal (1999-2001); Independent (2001-2003)
- Spouse: Jean-Robert Boyer
- Children: 3
- Education: University of Ottawa
- Occupation: Teacher

Claudette Boyer (January 9, 1938 – February 16, 2013) was a politician in Ontario, Canada. She was elected to the Legislative Assembly of Ontario in 1999 as a Liberal, but was later forced to leave the party as a result of legal difficulties. She retired from politics in 2003.

== Background ==
Boyer was born and raised in Ottawa, Ontario. She attended the University of Ottawa, receiving a Bachelor of Arts degree and a Teacher's Certificate. She worked as a teacher for thirty years, and was actively involved in the Association des enseignantes et des enseignants franco-ontariens (Franco-Ontarian teachers association), the Ontario Teachers' Federation and the Canadian Teachers Federation. She and her husband, Jean-Robert Boyer, raised three children, Pierre, Michel and Julie.

== Politics ==
In 1982, Boyer was elected as a school trustee for the Ottawa Board of Education. She represented Vanier separate school supporters. She remained as a trustee until 1986 when new legislation created a French language school board in Ottawa. She decided not to run for the new board. Soon after she joined the board of the l'Association Canadienne-Francaise de l'Ontario.

In 1990 she became the president of the riding association for Ottawa-Vanier. She stayed as president until 1994 when she resigned to compete for the nomination as federal Liberal candidate when Jean-Robert Gauthier resigned to accept a senate appointment. She was narrowly beaten by Mauril Belanger who became the MP in a subsequent by-election. She maintained her ties to the Liberal party as campaign manager for several local politicians including Jean-Robert Gauthier, Bernard Grandmaitre and Guy Cousineau.

In the provincial election of 1999, Boyer was elected to the Legislative Assembly of Ontario in the redistributed riding of Ottawa—Vanier, successor to Ottawa East. She easily defeated her Progressive Conservative opponent by almost 9,000 votes in what is considered a safe Liberal seat. She became the first Franco-Ontarian woman to be elected to Queen's Park. She served as the party's critic for Francophone Affairs and Women's Issues.

In December 1999, she was charged with obstruction of justice. In August, her husband was involved in an incident where he accidentally backed his car into Denis Grandmaitre, the son of former area MPP Bernard Grandmaître. He suffered a broken leg. An investigation resulted since several versions of the accident were given to police. During the investigation she was asked to step down from her legislative role as critic. It was revealed that Boyer asked three other people to claim they were driving instead of her husband. Her niece agreed to tell this version. In March 2001 Boyer and her husband pleaded guilty to one charge each of obstruction of justice to which they were granted a conditional discharge. As a result of this, Liberal leader Dalton McGuinty suspended her from the caucus. In September 2001, McGuinty said that she would not be allowed back into caucus and that she would have to serve the remainder of her term as an independent. Boyer was bitter about the rejection. She said, "It was very harsh... I made an error of judgment and as far as I'm concerned, I'm clear. I paid my dues. I cannot accept the way this went."

In 2003, Boyer put her name forward to be re-nominated as the Liberal candidate but McGuinty intervened and used his executive powers to appoint Madeleine Meilleur as the candidate. Boyer was rueful about the situation. She said, "I'm not bitter, I'm not frustrated either. I'm just sad about what is going on." Boyer elected not to run as an independent and retired from politics. Meilleur easily won the 2003 election.

== Later life ==
In 2004, she was awarded the Prix anniversaire by the Association des enseignantes et des enseignants franco-ontariens in recognition of her years of service to the community. In 2007 she became the President of the Ottawa chapter of the Francophone Assembly of Ontario. In August 2011 she was hospitalized due to a stroke.

She died at Montfort Hospital in Ottawa in 2013 of an intracranial hemorrhage. She was 75.
