= Office of the Legislative Assembly of Ontario =

The Office of the Legislative Assembly of Ontario, also called the Office of the Assembly, is an organization mandated to support the Speaker of the Legislative Assembly of Ontario and the legislature's Members of Provincial Parliament in the exercise of their parliamentary duties.

Independent of the Government of Ontario, the Office of the Assembly provides administrative and procedural services to all MPPs, as well as operational support for the daily activities of the Legislative Assembly of Ontario and its committees.

== Other offices of the Legislative Assembly ==
- Auditor General of Ontario
- Office of the Chief Electoral Officer
- Office of the Information and Privacy Commissioner
- Office of the Integrity Commissioner
- Office of the Ombudsman of Ontario
