= Horace Racine =

Canadian politician

Horace S. Racine

MPP for Ottawa East
- In office September 25, 1963 – October 16, 1967
- Preceded by: Jules Morin PC
- Succeeded by: Jules Morin PC

Personal details
- Born: September 13, 1905 Ottawa, Ontario
- Died: 1994 (aged 88–89)
- Party: Liberal

Horace S. Racine (September 13, 1905 – 1994) was a Canadian politician, who represented Ottawa East in the Legislative Assembly of Ontario from 1963 to 1967 as a Liberal member.

== Political Office ==
Racine's first attempt at political office was an unsuccessful effort to secure a position on the Ottawa Board of Control in the 1962 municipal election. He finished sixth in a field where the top four finishers became Controllers.

One year later, he ran and won in the provincial general election in 1963, defeating the incumbent PC MPP, Jules Morin. During his first term in office, he served on variety of Standing Committees as a member of the Opposition during one of the John Robarts majority PC governments. In the 1967 general election, Racine lost to his predecessor, Jules Morin, and he retired from politics.

== Background ==
Prior to being elected, Racine, with his partner Albert Landreville, founded a funeral home called Maison Funéraire Racine, Landreville, in the Francophone section of Ottawa known as Lower Town. In 1947, he merged that operation with another funeral home and the joint venture became known as Maison Funéraire Racine Robert and Gauthier. Racine served as the President of the Ottawa District Funeral Service Association from 1947 to 1948.

In 1944, Racine was also one of the founders of a service club in Ottawa known as Club Richelieu, designed to provide a Francophone alternative to Rotary International and Kiwanis. He served as a Director of the Club from 1945 to 1951 and as its President in 1950. The idea of a French-speaking service club proved popular in other Francophone areas in Canada, the U.S. and Europe and the concept started in Ottawa is now known as Richelieu International and boasts almost 70 clubs in North America and Europe. Racine served as a Director of Richelieu International from 1953 to 1957. He was active in other voluntary organizations, including the St-Jean-Baptiste Society of Ottawa (Secretary General in 1936 and, subsequently, President); Chairman of the Liberal Club of Ottawa East (1953–1957); Founder of Patro-Ottawa and its President in 1957 and he was a Member of the "Assembly Cartier 4th Degree" of the Knights of Columbus.

Secretary General (1936) généraral then president of the St-Jean-Baptisite Society of Ottawa, founding member (1945) and Chairman (1950) of the Richelieu Club of Ottawa-Hull and Director of International Richelieu (1953–1957), Chairman of the Liberal Club of Ottawa East (1953–1957) Founder of Patro-Ottawa, he was President in 1957 and is a member of the Assembly Cartier 4th degree Knights of Columbus.

Racine received the Queen Elizabeth II Silver Jubilee Medal in 1977 for his public service.

Racine was married twice, first, on May 2, 1929, to Mary Alma Quinn and, second, to Alice Carruthers on May 10, 1975. He died at St. Joseph Hospital, Ottawa, in 1994, and he is buried in Notre Dame Cemetery, on Montreal Road in Ottawa.

== Election results ==
Ottawa Board of Control (4 elected)

Candidate	Votes	%
Lloyd Francis (X)	53,327	
Don Reid(X)	50,046	
Ellen Webber	40,095	
Ernie Jones	36,466	
Roy Donaldson	31,766	
Horace Racine	30,866	
Matt McGrath	16,686	
Serge Tardif	14,818	
Sam McLean	7,647	
Joseph Louis Paradis	6,684	
