= Aurèle Chartrand =

Canadian politician

MPP for Ottawa East
- In office June 4, 1945 -- – May 2, 1955
- Preceded by: Robert Laurier
- Succeeded by: Jules Morin

Personal details
- Born: October 14, 1903; Ottawa, Ontario
- Died: May 21, 1975 (aged 71); Ottawa, Ontario
- Political party: Ontario Liberal Party

Aurèle Chartrand, QC (October 14, 1903 – May 21, 1975) was an Ontario barrister and political figure. He represented Ottawa East in the Legislative Assembly of Ontario as a Liberal from 1945 to 1955.

He was born in Ottawa, Ontario, the son of Zenon Chartrand, and was educated at the University of Ottawa and Osgoode Hall. He was named King's Counsel in 1948. Chartrand was an unsuccessful candidate in the 1940 by-election held for the provincial seat when Robert Laurier was elected. He died at an Ottawa hospital in 1975.
