= Jules Morin =

Canadian politician

Ontario MPP
- In office 1967–1971
- Preceded by: Horace Racine
- Succeeded by: Albert Roy
- In office 1955–1963
- Preceded by: Aurèle Chartrand
- Succeeded by: Horace Racine
- Constituency: Ottawa East

Ottawa Alderman
- In office January 1, 1945 – May 22, 1963
- Preceded by: J. M. Laframboise
- Succeeded by: Cecile O'Regan
- In office January 1, 1965 – December 31, 1974
- Preceded by: Cecile O'Regan
- Succeeded by: Georges Bédard
- Constituency: By Ward; By-St. George's Ward (1973–1974)

Ottawa Controller
- In office May 22, 1963 – December 31, 1964
- Preceded by: Lloyd Francis
- Succeeded by: Kenneth Fogarty and Murray Heit

Personal details
- Born: 1914; Ottawa, Ontario
- Died: September 22, 1988 (aged 74); Ottawa
- Political party: Progressive Conservative
- Spouse: Gabrielle
- Children: 2
- Occupation: Merchant

Jules Morin (1914 – September 22, 1988) was a politician in Ontario, Canada. He was a Progressive Conservative member of the Legislative Assembly of Ontario from 1955 to 1963 and from 1967 to 1971 who represented the riding of Ottawa East. He was also a city councillor in Ottawa, Ontario from 1944 to 1974.

== Background ==
Morin was born in Ottawa in 1914. He first worked as a milkman and later opened a store.

== Politics ==
Morin was elected to Ottawa City Council in 1944 and served until 1974, serving briefly on the Ottawa Board of Control from 1963 to 1964. He also served as a director of the Central Canada Exhibition.

He died of cancer in 1988 at the Élisabeth Bruyère Health Centre.
