= André Marin =

Canadian lawyer

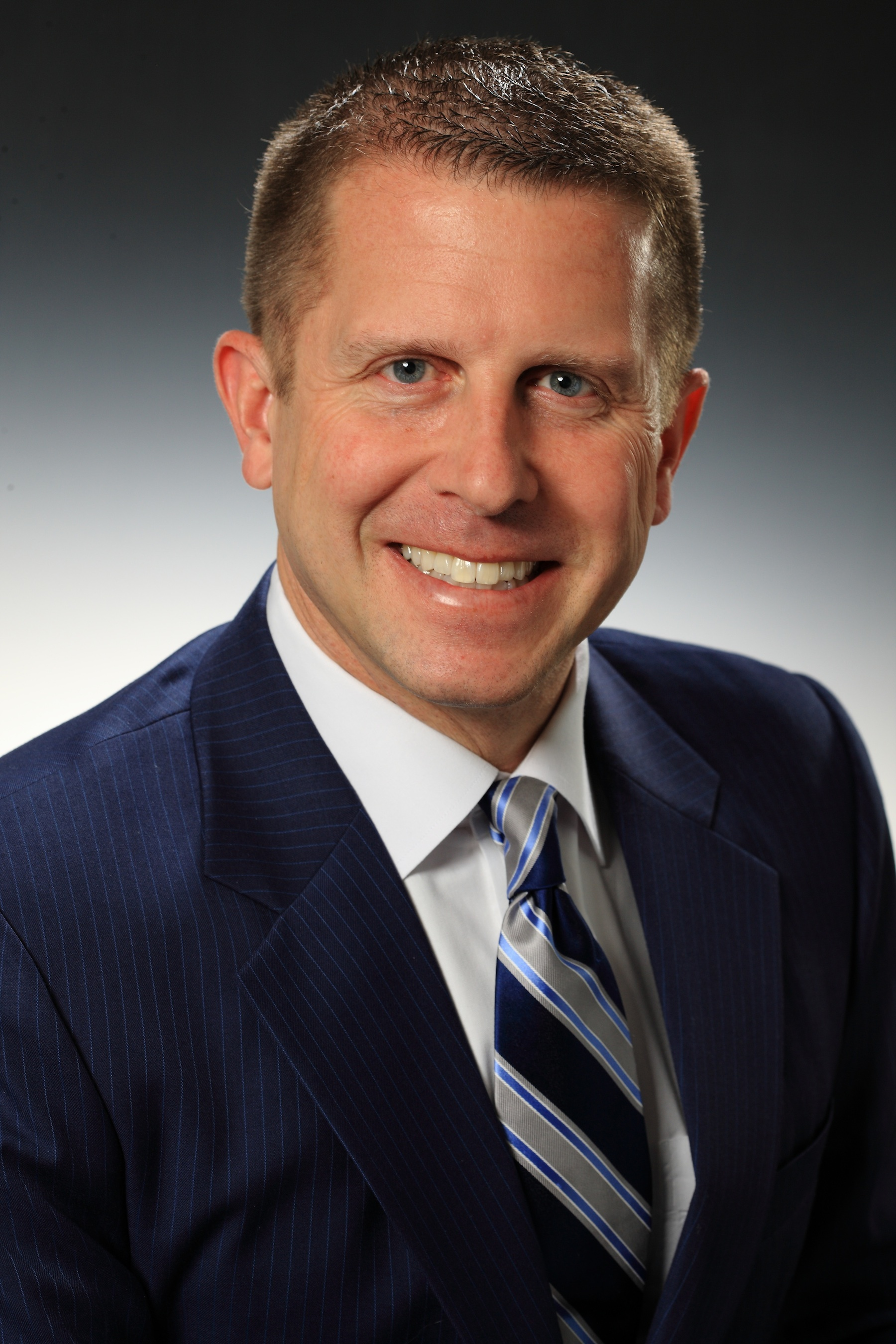

6th Ontario Ombudsman
- In office April 1, 2005 – September 14, 2015
- Preceded by: Clare Lewis
- Succeeded by: Paul Dubé

Personal details
- Party: Progressive Conservative
- Children: 6
- Education: Carleton University
- Profession: Lawyer

André Marin, born on 12 January 1965, is a Canadian lawyer. He served as the first Ombudsman of the National Defence and the Canadian Armed Forces from 1998 to 2005, and as Ontario ombudsman from 2005 to 2015.

== Personal ==
Marin is a graduate of Carleton University (BA 1985) and University of Ottawa (LLL 1988, JD 1989).

== Career ==
After graduating from law school, Marin became an assistant Crown Attorney in Ottawa, Ontario in 1991 and taught law part-time in Ottawa.

From September 1996 until June 1998, he served as the Director of Ontario's Special Investigations Unit (SIU). During his tenure at the SIU, the office initiated over 300 investigations, laid 5 charges resulting from those investigations and obtained no convictions.

In June 1998, Marin was appointed as Canada's first Ombudsman of the National Defence and the Canadian Armed Forces.

=== Ombudsman of Ontario ===
On April 1, 2005, Marin was appointed as Ombudsman of Ontario by the Legislative Assembly of Ontario. On June 1, 2010, he was reappointed to a second five-year term ending on May 31, 2015.

In March 2007, Marin's office released a report on the province's conduct in regards to the Ontario lottery retailer fraud scandal.

In December 2010, Marin's office released a report on the province's conduct in regard to the 2010 G-20 Toronto summit. Marin said that it was "illegal" for the government to pass secret regulations allowing for the detaining of protesters during the summit protests.

In October 2013, he released a report criticizing London, Ontario mayor Joe Fontana and city councilors for a secret meeting at a restaurant where they discussed city business. The councilors and mayor denied the report.

In November 2014, Marin released a report that was critical of the Liberal government, calling it 'systematic government ineptitude" that led to the deaths of four children in unlicensed home daycares. The investigation was prompted after a 2-year-old child died in an unlicensed daycare in Vaughan. Marin issued 113 recommendations, and called on the province to take urgent action.

==== Office issues and expenses ====
A 2006 report for the Canadian Department of National Defence found Marin had created a dysfunctional workplace at his office during his tenure, with multiple complaints and staff departures. In 2010, the Toronto Star investigated human rights and labour complaints made by staff under Andre Marin's tenure. Current and former staff members complained of a culture of fear and harassment. A number of complaints were filed against the ombudsman, the office and his management team with the Ontario Human Rights Tribunal and the union. Marin had called the allegations "absurd" and stated he had "high expectations" for his employees.

In 2010, The Globe and Mail publicized some of the expenses Marin billed to taxpayers, including his personal grooming products, a $38 toothbrush and a $2,000 flat screen TV for his Ottawa home. The Star also reported that Marin used the office's corporate services director to pick-up his dry cleaning and keep an eye on Marin's maid when she cleaned his Toronto condo.

In April 2015, Marin's expenses came under scrutiny again when the National Post revealed Marin had billed Ontario taxpayers an average of $14,800 in three months for housing expenses so he could maintain residences in both Toronto and Ottawa, sometimes spending more than $2,000 a month in rent while in Toronto. It is estimated Marin billed taxpayers $592,000 in housing since being appointed in 2005.

==== Extending term ====
On May 28, 2015, the Ontario Legislature voted to extend Marin's term as ombudsman until September 14 to allow him to wrap-up investigations. Over 60 people applied to become Ontario's next ombudsman, including Marin. On September 14, 2015, a motion to grant Marin a second extension was defeated in the Legislature. On April 15, 2016, Marin sued the Ontario government for wrongful dismissal. Marin claimed to have been fired without cause or notice when he was not rehired for a third term,. The Ontario Superior Court of Justice ruled against Marin.

=== Later career ===
After leaving office, Marin began teaching part-time in the University of Ottawa's faculty of law and writing a column for the Ottawa Sun and Toronto Sun. He stopped writing the column in December, 2019. In 2020, Marin was hired by People's Party of Canada leader Maxime Bernier to represent him in a lawsuit filed against political strategist Warren Kinsella alleging Kinsella was hired by the Conservative Party of Canada to run a pre-election campaign of defamation against Bernier. The court dismissed the suit in November 2021.

== Politics ==
On September 24, 2016, Marin was named the Progressive Conservative candidate for the November 2016 by-election in Ottawa—Vanier. He was defeated by Liberal candidate Nathalie Des Rosiers by a 19-point margin, the best performance by a Progressive Conservative candidate in the riding for fifty years. In remarks given after his defeat, Marin warned that party leader Patrick Brown had to put social conservatives "in their place" because they are "a threat to the party" that might cost them the 42nd Ontario general election.

=== Electoral record ===
Ontario provincial by-election, November 17, 2016: Ottawa—Vanier Resignation of Madeleine Meilleur
Party	Candidate	Votes	%	±%
Liberal	Nathalie Des Rosiers	14,979	49.19	-6.37
Progressive Conservative	André Marin	9,051	29.72	+7.43
New Democratic	Claude Bisson	4,459	14.64	+1.33
Green	Raphaël Morin	993	3.26	-4.75
Stop the New Sex-Ed Agenda	Elizabeth de Viel Castel	384	1.26	
Libertarian	Dean T. Harris	177	0.58	-0.26
None of the Above	Above Znoneofthe	164	0.54	
Canadian Constituents'	Stephanie McEvoy	74	0.24	
People's Political Party	Kevin Clarke	73	0.24	
Freedom	David McGruer	52	0.17	
Pauper	John Turmel	48	0.16	
Total valid votes		30,454	99.50	
Total rejected ballots		153	0.50	-0.80
Turnout		30,607	37.36	-11.49
Eligible voters		81,902		
Liberal hold		Swing		-6.90
Source(s) Elections Ontario

Legal offices
Preceded by James M. Stewart	Director of the Special Investigations Unit; 1996–1998	Succeeded by Peter A. Tinsley
