= Police Services Act (Ontario) =

Law governing the conduct of police officers in the province of Ontario, Canada

Community Safety and Policing Act, 2019

Legislative Assembly of Ontario
- Citation: S.O. 2019, c. 1, Sched. 1
- Enacted by: Legislative Assembly of Ontario
- Status: In force

The Community Safety and Policing Act, 2019 (French: Loi de 2019 sur la sécurité communautaire et les services policiers; S.O. 2019, c. 1, Sched. 1) ("the Act") is the law governing the conduct of police officers in the province of Ontario, Canada. The Special Investigations Unit, a civilian oversight agency which conducts independent investigations where police actions have resulted in the death or injury of a civilian, is governed by the separate Special Investigations Unit Act, 2019.

Enforcing the legislation is within the responsibility of the Ministry of the Solicitor General.

== History ==
The previous law, the Police Services Act, was passed in 1990 to provide a legal means to define the role of all police forces in Ontario (excluding the Royal Canadian Mounted Police (RCMP) ) and to create the Special Investigations Unit. It replaced the earlier Police Act, introduced in 1946, to define the role of all police forces in Ontario. Before the Police Act there were two statutes governing the role of police in the province:

- Municipal Act - The government decided to change the law in 2012 to provide safer qualities within the government - governing smaller police forces in villages, towns and cities; it also allowed the contracting of the OPP for local policing needs
- Constables Act - governing the Ontario Provincial Police and county police services (with amendments in 1922); first introduced to allow the formation of constables who provided law and order in the towns and cities of early years of Ontario (Upper Canada and Canada West).

The Police Services Act was eventually repealed and replaced by the Community Safety and Policing Act, 2019 (CSPA), which was passed part of the Comprehensive Ontario Police Services Act, 2019 reform bill.
