= Paul Leduc (politician) =

Canadian politician

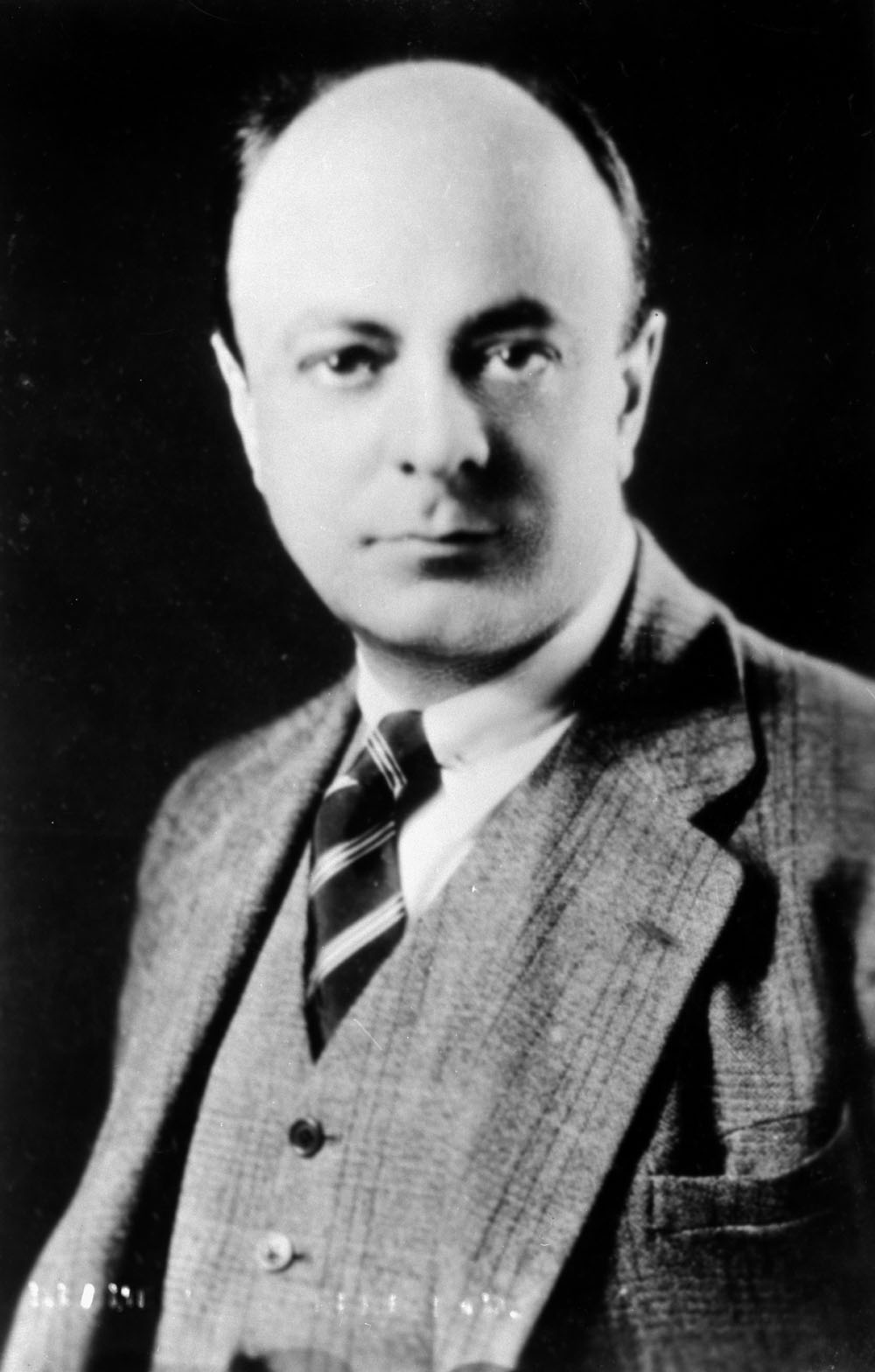
- Leduc, c. 1930s

MPP for Ottawa East
- In office June 19, 1934 – September 27, 1940

Registrar of the Supreme Court of Canada
- In office 1940 – 1958

Personal details
- Born: January 28, 1889 Montreal, Quebec
- Died: December 17, 1971 (aged 82) Ottawa, Ontario
- Party: Ontario Liberal Party

Marie Charles Denis Paul Leduc (January 28, 1889 – December 17, 1971) was an Ontario barrister, solicitor and political figure. He represented Ottawa East in the Legislative Assembly of Ontario as a Liberal member from 1934 to 1940. He was then appointed as Registrar of the Supreme Court of Canada, a position he held until 1958.

He was born in Montreal, the son of Napoléon Leduc, and was educated there and at the Université Laval. In 1917, he married Gabrielle Belcourt, who was the daughter of Napoléon Belcourt. Leduc served as Minister of Mines in the provincial cabinet from 1934 to 1940. From April to October 1937, he was Attorney General, the only Francophone to hold this position. He was a candidate in the 1958 federal elections, but was not elected.

He died at an Ottawa hospital in 1971.
