= Lucille Collard =

Canadian politician

Lucille Collard MPP
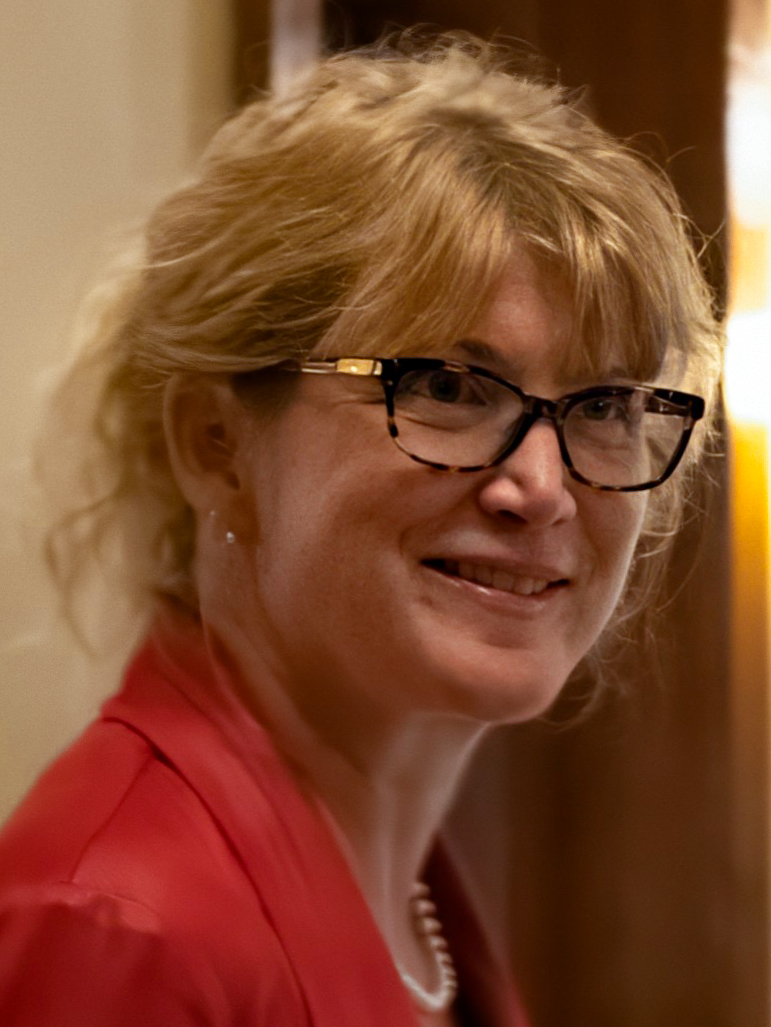
- Collard in 2020

Member of the Ontario Provincial Parliament for Ottawa—Vanier
- Incumbent
- Assumed office February 27, 2020
- Preceded by: Nathalie Des Rosiers

Conseil des écoles publiques de l'Est de l'Ontario School Trustee
- In office December 1, 2010 – February 27, 2020
- Preceded by: Denis Chartrand
- Succeeded by: Warsama Abdourahman Aden
- Constituency: Zone 10

Personal details
- Party: Liberal
- Occupation: Politician; lawyer

Lucille Collard MPP is a Canadian politician who has been a member of Provincial Parliament (MPP) since 2020. A member of the Ontario Liberal Party, Collard represents Ottawa—Vanier in the Legislative Assembly of Ontario.

== Background ==
Collard completed a law degree at the University of Ottawa in 1999 and pursued a public service career as a lawyer. She practised international trade law with the NAFTA Secretariat, administrative and regulatory law with the Canadian Nuclear Safety Commission and public law as a federal government civil litigator at the Federal Court of Canada.

Collard is a mother of four children and has reported education as a personal interest. In 2003, she launched a pilot francophone school with 18 students – Trille des Bois – which was officially opened in 2010. Today, 600 students attend Trille des Bois.

== Political career ==
=== Trustee ===
Collard first ran for public office in 2010 and was elected as a School Trustee for the Rideau-Vanier Zone. She was re-elected in 2014 and 2018. Following her second re-election, she was elected as chair of the board of the Conseil des écoles publiques de l'Est de l'Ontario.

=== Provincial politics ===
In early 2020, Collard won the Liberal nomination for the by-election to the provincial electoral district of Ottawa—Vanier, which was vacated by Nathalie Des Rosiers. She was elected on February 7, 2020, with 52.2% of the vote.

In the Legislative Assembly of Ontario, she has served as the Liberal opposition critic for the following ministerial portfolios:

- Ministry of the Attorney General (the provincial judiciary, criminal justice system and legal defence of the Government of Ontario)
- Ministry of the Solicitor General (law enforcement, penitentiary and correctional services)
- Office of Women's Social and Economic Opportunity
- Ministry of the Environment, Conservation and Parks
- Ministry of Francophone Affairs

She was re-elected in the 2022 Ontario general election. A motion to have the Franco-Ontarian flag flown permanently at the provincial parliament was moved by Collard in 2021 and received all-party support. Two pieces of her own legislation received unanimous support in the House: one to better support survivors of human trafficking and another to protect children from online dangers. She was also chosen to serve as deputy speaker in the 43rd Parliament of Ontario.

== Electoral history ==
2025 Ontario general election: Ottawa—Vanier
Party	Candidate	Votes	%	±%
Liberal	Lucille Collard	20,721	51.45	+9.73
Progressive Conservative	Marilissa Gosselin	9,085	22.56	+2.39
New Democratic	Myriam Djilane	7,350	18.25	–7.68
Green	Christian Proulx	2,083	5.17	–2.63
Libertarian	Coreen Corcoran	525	1.30	+0.44
New Blue	Rishabh Bhatia	511	1.27	+0.23
Total valid votes		40,275	99.09	
Total rejected, unmarked and declined ballots		371	0.91	+0.24
Turnout		40,646	38.82	–0.60
Eligible voters		104,696		
Liberal hold		Swing		+3.67
Source: Elections Ontario

2022 Ontario general election: Ottawa—Vanier
Party	Candidate	Votes	%	±%	Expenditures
Liberal	Lucille Collard	16,132	41.71	–10.50	$80,016
New Democratic	Lyra Evans	10,026	25.93	+0.67	$54,961
Progressive Conservative	Patrick Mayangi	7,798	20.16	+8.47	$22,402
Green	Christian Proulx	3,019	7.81	–0.78	$9,017
Ontario Party	Eric Armstrong-Giroux	587	1.52	–	$506
New Blue	Michael Pastien	400	1.03	–	$1,737
Libertarian	Coreen Corcoran	335	0.87	+0.22	$786
None of the Above	Blake Hamilton	210	0.54	+0.07	$565
Freedom	David McGruer	166	0.43	–	$0
Total valid votes/expense limit		38,673	99.32	–	$142,255
Total rejected, unmarked and declined ballots		263	0.68	+0.13	
Turnout		38,936	39.42	+19.53	
Eligible voters		98,774			
Liberal hold		Swing		–5.59	
Source: Elections Ontario
