= Ontario Ombudsman =

Officer of the Ontario Legislative Assembly

Office of the Ombudsman of Ontario

Office overview
- Formed: July 10, 1975; 51 years ago
- Jurisdiction: Government of Ontario
- Headquarters: Bell Trinity Square, 483 Bay Street, 10th Floor, South Tower, Toronto, Ontario M5G 2C9; 43.6534366°N 79.3823149°W
- Motto: Ontario's Watchdog
- Employees: ~80 staff
- Annual budget: $11,288,100 (2013–14)
- Office executives: Paul Dubé, Ombudsman; Barbara Finlay, Deputy Ombudsman; Carl Bouchard, French Language Services Commissioner
- Parent Office: Office of the Legislative Assembly of Ontario
- Key document: Ombudsman Act, R.S.O. 1990, c. O.6
- Website: www.ombudsman.on.ca

The Office of the Ombudsman of Ontario is an independent office of the Legislative Assembly of Ontario in the Canadian province of Ontario.

== Role ==
The office's jurisdiction includes more than 500 provincial government ministries, agencies, corporations, tribunals, boards and commissions. In addition to the oversight of governmental bodies, the office is also responsible for the intake of public complaints which indicate the possibility of maladministration within the Government of Ontario and in the appropriate cases conducts an investigation. The office is generally an office of last resort and cannot legally conduct investigations into the lives of private citizens or the private sector.

The office's official director holds the title of "ombudsman" and is appointed to a five-year renewable term by a provincially legislated all-party committee. The ombudsman may launch investigations of their own accord or motion.

All Canadian provinces, with the exception of Prince Edward Island, have a provincial ombudsman (known as Protecteur/protectrice du citoyen in Quebec and Citizens' Representative in Newfoundland and Labrador).

== History ==
In March 1975, Ontario became the seventh province to establish an ombudsman's office, preceded by Alberta and New Brunswick (1967), Quebec (1968), Manitoba and Nova Scotia (1970), and Saskatchewan (1972).

In December 2014, the provincial legislature passed Bill 8, the Public Sector and MPP Accountability and Transparency Act, expanding the office's jurisdiction by granting it the ability to oversee three of the four areas of the "M.U.S.H." sector. The M.U.S.H. sector includes: municipalities, universities, school boards, and hospitals. Oversight was granted over all areas, with the exception of hospitals. Oversight involving school boards began September 1, 2015, while oversight of municipalities and universities begins January 1, 2016.

In February 2015, the provincial government announced it would require that all Officers of the Legislature undergo an open competition to fill the roles.

== Ombudsman Act ==
The powers and authority secured by the Office of the Ombudsman of Ontario are set out in the Ombudsman Act. Powers include: permission to enter any government premises to gather evidence without a legal warrant and the power to acquire evidence from witnesses. Witnesses include individuals, government officials and employees. If the ombudsman decides a witness is "un-cooperative", that witness can face criminal charges. To date, no charges have been laid since the Act was introduced.

The ombudsman may report their findings from investigations publicly if it is found that a "decision, recommendation, act or omission" made by a government body under the office's jurisdiction was contrary to law.

== Complaints procedure ==
Public complaints are made by phone, online, in writing, in person, via email or through the office. If it is decided that an investigation is warranted, investigators are assigned to review the matter and gather evidence. Complainants are advised to try and resolve their issue through the complaint and appeal procedures offered by the government agency in question. Ombudsman staff assist people who are unsure whether an avenue of appeal exists.

== List of Ombudsmen ==
- Arthur Maloney (1975–1979)
- Donald Morand (1979–1984)
- Daniel Hill (1984–1989)
- Roberta Jamieson (1989–1999)
- Clare Lewis (2000–2005)
- André Marin (2005–2015)
- Barbara Finlay (Acting: September 15, 2015 – March 31, 2016)
- Paul Dubé (April 1, 2016 – March 31, 2026)
- Barbara Finlay (Acting: April 1, 2026 - current)

On September 14, 2015, the legislative committee called to choose the next ombudsman reported back to the Legislature that they had not reached a consensus within the allotted time. A motion to grant André Marin a second extension until a new ombudsman was chosen was defeated. Marin's tenure as ombudsman ended on midnight of September 14, 2015.
