= Assessment Review Board =

Assessment Review Board _{Commission de révision de l'évaluation foncière (French)}
Agency overview
- Type: Tribunal
- Jurisdiction: Province of Ontario
- Headquarters: 25 Grosvenor Street Toronto, Ontario
- Minister responsible: Attorney General of Ontario
- Parent agency: Tribunals Ontario
- Key document: Assessment Act
- Website: tribunalsontario.ca/arb/

The Assessment Review Board (ARB; French: Commission de révision de l'évaluation foncière) is an independent, quasi-judicial agency in Ontario, Canada. It is one of 13 adjudicative tribunals under the Ministry of the Attorney General that make up Tribunals Ontario.

The role and authority of ARB is mandated under the Assessment Act and hears appeals on issues regarding property assessment, classifications, and taxes in Ontario.

== Powers and process ==
Appeals are filed with the ARB when there is a dispute between the property owners and the Municipal Property Assessment Corporation (MPAC), which is responsible for assessing and classifying all property values in Ontario. Those who own a property with residential, farm, managed forest or conversation land classification, must file a Request for Reconsideration (RFR) with MPAC if they disagree with their assessment and receive a decision before filing an appeal with the ARB.

At the ARB, appeals are heard in either a Summary proceeding or a General proceeding. Properties classified as residential, farm, conservation land and managed forest are heard by a summary proceeding. Summary proceedings have fewer steps than a general proceeding and are generally used for simple appeals. Properties of other classes are heard by a general proceeding.
