= FSC =

FSC may refer to:

== Education ==
- Farmingdale State College, a college in New York, United States
- Fitchburg State College, now Fitchburg State University, in Massachusetts, United States
- Florida Southern College, in Lakeland, Florida, United States
- Florida State College at Jacksonville, a college in Florida, United States
- Florida Sun Conference, an American college athletic conference
- Forest School Camps, a British camping organisation
- Framingham State College, a college in Massachusetts, United States
- Institute of the Brothers of the Christian Schools (Latin: Fratres Scholarum Christianorum), a Roman Catholic religious teaching order
- Faculty of Science or Fellow of Science, a course for the completion of the Higher Secondary School Certificate in Pakistan

== Finance ==
- Financial Services Commission (disambiguation)
- Financial Supervision Commission, Isle of Man
- Financial Supervisory Commission (Taiwan)
- Foreign Sales Corporation, a repealed tax device of the United States Internal Revenue Code

== Governmental and politics ==
- Catalan Federation of the PSOE, a defunct political party in Catalonia, Spain
- Federal Salary Council, an advisory body of the United States federal government
- Federal Shariat Court of Pakistan
- Fire Safety Commission, Ontario, Canada
- Texas Forensic Science Commission, a state agency of Texas, United States

== Industry ==
- Fabryka Samochodów Ciężarowych, a Polish automotive company
- Fiji Sugar Corporation, a Fiji government-owned sugar milling company
- Fujitsu Siemens Computers, a Japanese and German IT supply chain

== Other organisations ==
- Les Scouts - Fédération des Scouts Baden-Powell de Belgique (FSC, Catholic Baden-Powell-Scout Federation of Belgium)
- Field Studies Council, a British environmental education charity
- Filipino Society of Cinematographers
- First Satanic Church, an organization dedicated to Satanism and the occult
- Forest Stewardship Council, an international environmental organization for protection of trees from cutting and increasing their number
- Free Speech Coalition, a US trade association for the adult film and pornography industry, founded in 1991
- Free Speech Coalition, New Zealand group founded in 2018, renamed Free Speech Union (New Zealand) in 2021
- Fountain Street Church, in Grand Rapids, Michigan, United States

== Other uses ==
- Figari Sud-Corse Airport, in Corsica, France
- Fine-structure constant
- Fire-safe cigarette
- Firearm Safety Certificate, California, US
- Foo Swee Chin (born 1977), Singaporean comic book artist
- Food supply chain
- Football South Coast, in New South Wales, Australia
- Fourier shell correlation
- Funvic Soul Cycles–Carrefour, a Brazilian cycling team
- Future Surface Combatant of the Royal Navy
- Forward-scattered light, a parameter of flow cytometry
