= Gerry McNeilly =

- Education: York University Bachelor of Arts; Queen's University Bachelor of Law
- Alma mater: York University Bachelor of Arts
- Occupation: Office of the Independent Police Review Director
- Years active: 2008–2019

Gerry McNeilly (born 1950s) is a lawyer who was the Ontario's Office of the Independent Police Review Director (OIPRD) from its creation in 2008 (opened 19 October 2009) to 1 April 2019 when the position was filled in an interim capacity by the previous deputy director Sylvana Capogreco. The OIPRD is a civilian body operating under Attorney General of Ontario with powers invested through Public Inquiries Act to investigate complaints about municipal police forces and the Ontario Provincial Police.

== Education ==
McNeilly graduated from York University (Bachelor of Arts) and Queen's University (Bachelor of Laws).

== Career ==
Prior to his current position, McNeilly served in legal roles in the provinces of Manitoba and Ontario. He was Executive Director of Legal Aid Manitoba 1999–2008, Chair of the Board of Inquiry for the Ontario Human Rights Tribunal 1995–1999, Justice of the Peace (Ontario), and Deputy Provincial Judge (Ontario). On 4 September 2019, he was appointed as one of the foreign experts to Hong Kong's Independent Police Complaints Council (IPCC) to help ensure the IPCC's probe into allegations of police brutality during recent unrest in Hong Kong was credible and free of bias. On 11 December 2019, he and other foreign experts resigned because "a crucial shortfall was evident in the powers, capacity and independent investigative capability of IPCC."

=== Office of the Independent Police Review Director ===
McNeilly's role as Director of OIPRD began in 2008. The National Post described the OIPRD as an "arm's-length civilian agency" operated under the Attorney General of Ontario. As Office Director, McNeilly can order police investigations, searches, seizures, and can "subpoena documents and witnesses, including chiefs of police" under the Public Inquiries Act.

He can recommend, but not order disciplinary action against officers or that police procedure be changed. Prior to the creation of the Office, complaints about police were "handled internally" by police departments.

In its first six months the OIPRD handled 2,400 complaints.

One of his largest and highest-profile investigations was the review of police conduct during the 2010 G-20 Toronto summit in response to 300 complaints.

McNeilly was the lead author on the OIPRD's 208-page report entitled "Broken Trust: Indigenous People and the Thunder Bay Police Service" which was released in December 2018. The report concluded that TBPS needed to "improve its relationship with Indigenous communities" and that it needs to "ensure that its investigations are timely, effective and non-discriminatory.

== Controversy ==
The position of the OIRPD director was assumed by the prior deputy director Sylvana Capogreco in an interim capacity effective 1 April 2019. The decision to end his directorship before finding a permanent replacement raises questions as to its relation to the Divisional Court finding that he changed the decision of a complaint against Toronto Police Service (TPS) Constable Chris Howes from substantiated to unsubstantiated after he had communications with the TPS outside of the complaint process."

Legal offices
Preceded by TBD	Director of the Legal Aid Manitoba; 1999–2008	Succeeded by Gil Clifford
Preceded by new position	Office of the Independent Police Review Director; 2008–	Succeeded by incumbent
