= Protecting Tenants and Strengthening Community Housing Act, 2020 =

Law of Ontario, Canada

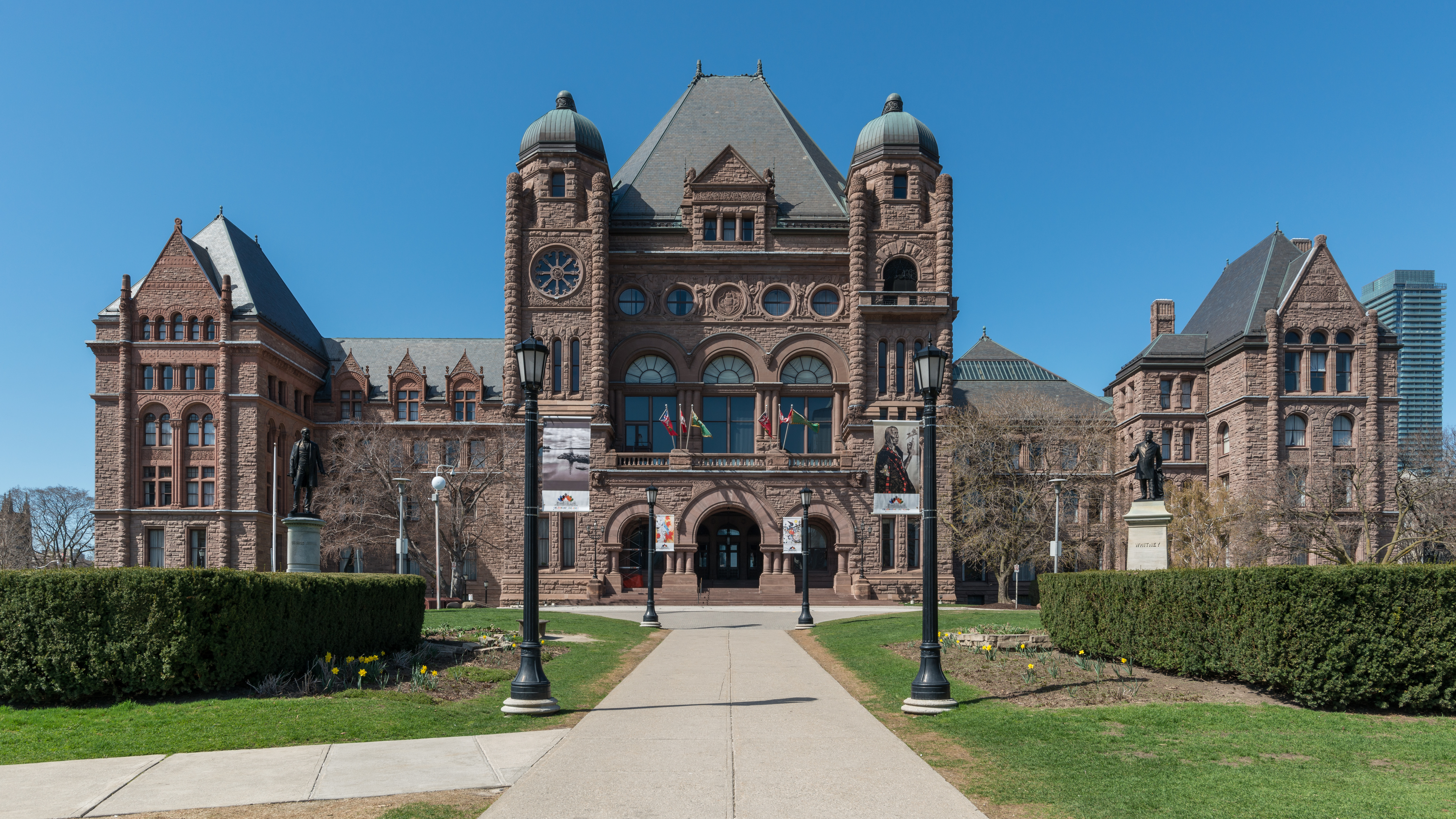

Legislative Assembly of Ontario
- Long title: An Act to amend the Building Code Act, 1992, the Housing Services Act, 2011 and the Residential Tenancies Act, 2006 and to enact the Ontario Mortgage and Housing Corporation Repeal Act, 2020 (Bill 184, 2020)
- Territorial extent: Ontario
- Enacted by: Legislative Assembly of Ontario
- Royal assent: 21 July 2020

Legislative history
- First reading: 12 March 2020
- Second reading: 27 May 2020
- Third reading: 21 July 2020

The Protecting Tenants and Strengthening Community Housing Act, 2020 (Bill 184, 2020; French: Loi visant la protection des locataires et le renforcement du logement communautaire) is a law in the province of Ontario that brought a number of changes to regulations surrounding rented housing in the province.

== Summary ==
The bill made a number of amendments to the Residential Tenancies Act, 2006 and the Housing Services Act, 2011, including giving landlords the power to offer tenants take-it-or-leave-it repayment plans, bypassing the Landlord and Tenant Board, and allowing landlords to make applications for arrears of rent up to twelve months after the tenant left the rental unit. The bill additionally allows landlords to make illegal rent increases, provided that the tenant doesn't dispute the increase within the first twelve months.

As well, the bill increased the fine for bad faith evictions, allowing the tenant to seek an amount equal to up to one year's rent if the landlord is found that have evicted them in bad faith.

== Legislative history ==
The bill was first presented to the Legislative Assembly of Ontario in March 2020, amid the COVID-19 pandemic in Ontario and less than a month before a moratorium on evictions was declared by the province in response to the pandemic.

Some amendments to the bill were made by the Standing Committee on Social Policy before the bill returned to the Legislative Assembly for third reading, including that all applications that had already been filed but hadn't yet been heard by the Landlord and Tenant Board would proceed under the terms of the bill. It received royal assent on 21 July 2020.

== Reactions ==
Many critics accused the government of favouring landlords and eroding protections for tenants, which was of especially grave concern considering the impact of the COVID-19 pandemic. Some tenants' advocacy movements dubbed the bill the "eviction bill."

The Ontario New Democratic Party opposed the bill. Opposition critic for tenant rights and NDP MPP for Toronto Centre Suze Morrison called for the government to "scrap its plan to make evictions easier and step up with rent relief to help see tenants through the economic pain of COVID-19." In September 2020, NDP MPP Jessica Bell introduced a private members' bill targeting eviction tactics used by landlords for financial gain, stating that Bill 184 failed to provide tenants with enough protection.

Others, however, supported the bill, arguing that the Landlord Tenant Board often failed to deal with disputes in a timely manner and that the bill still allowed tenants recourse to mediation for disputes. Steve Clark, Minister of Municipal Affairs and Housing, stated that the bill increased protections for tenants and that the mediation alternatives "would make better use of LTB time and resources, while encouraging landlords and tenants to come to resolutions faster."

The Toronto City Council solicitor advised the council not to attempt a court challenge over the law ahead of a council meeting.

The Institute for Research on Public Policy stated that the bill "has opened the door to a wave of evictions, which will be disproportionately targeted at low-income tenants experiencing intersecting vulnerabilities."
