= Rent regulation in Canada =

Rent regulation in Canada is a set of laws and policies which control the amount by which rental prices for real property can increase year to year. Each province and territory can pass legislation, where the purpose is to limit rent prices increasing beyond what is affordable for most home dwellers.

== By province and territory ==
=== Alberta ===
The Residential Tenancies Act and Regulations are the laws governing the rental of residential property and leading the relationship between the landlord and their tenants in the province of Alberta.

In Alberta, there is no limit to the rent amount landlords are permitted to charge. Rents can only be increased once a year for an existing tenant. A notice of rent increase must be provided three months in advance for periodic leases (a rolled-over fixed-term lease), and there is no notice requirements for fixed-term leases.

=== British Columbia ===
According to Mike Hagar for The Globe and Mail, in BC rents can only be increased once a year for existing tenants. A rent increase cannot exceed 2.9 per cent in 2016. Written notice of a rent increase must be provided three months in advance.

=== Nova Scotia ===
The Residential Tenancies Act and Regulations are the laws governing the rental of residential property and leading the relationship between the landlord and their tenants in the province of Nova Scotia.

=== Ontario ===
Rent regulation was first introduced in Ontario under the National Housing Act, 1944.

The Residential Tenancies Act, 2006 is the current law in Ontario that governs landlord and tenant relations in residential rental accommodations. The Act received royal assent on June 22, 2006 and was proclaimed into law on January 31, 2007. The Act repealed and replaced the Tenant Protection Act, 1997, and created the Landlord and Tenant Board as a replacement for the Ontario Rental Housing Tribunal.

Rent control in Ontario formerly only applied to units that were first built or occupied before November 1, 1991. If the rental unit was in an apartment building constructed (or converted from a non-residential use) after November 1, 1991, then the rent control provisions of the Residential Tenancies Act, 2006, did not apply. On April 20, 2017, Premier of Ontario Kathleen Wynne, along with Chris Ballard, Minister of Housing, announced the Fair Housing Plan. The plan includes a provision to roll-back the post-1991 rent control exemption such that all private rental units, including ones built or first occupied on or after November 1, 1991 will be subject to rent control. This change will be effective April 20, 2017 regardless of when the legislation is passed.

Additionally, a concern of negative impact of rent control is that increasing rent prices for continuing tenants are generally smaller than new tenants. Thus, setting this policy might discourage residential mobility, actually a process that change lives and neighbourhoods, since rent price increases for continuing tenants are generally smaller than for new residents.

=== Saskatchewan ===
The Residential Tenancies Act and Regulations are the laws governing the rental of residential property and leading the relationship between the landlord and their tenants in the province of Saskatchewan.

In Saskatchewan, there is no limit to the rent amount landlords are permitted to charge. Notice of rent increase must be provided two months or one year in advance, length of notice depending on if it is a fixed term lease.

=== Yukon ===
In the Yukon, there is no limit to the rent landlords can set at the beginning of a lease. However, they can only increase rent once within 12 months by 2%, more only if the inflation rate of the previous calendar year was higher, but not more than 5% in any case. Furthermore, no-cause evictions have been banned.

These rules are not codified in any law passed by the Yukon legislature, but by two Commissioner's Orders-In-Council (Yukon OIC 2023/32 and 2023/33). Exemptions exist where the Government is the landlord and the rent is tied to the tenant's income.

Fixed term leases are permitted by the Act, but if the landlord allows the tenant to stay longer without entering into a new fixed term lease, the lease turns into a month-to-month lease that only the tenant can cancel without cause.

On December 1 2026, rent controls were discontinued in the territory.

== See also ==
- Rent regulation
- Rent control in England and Wales
