= Child protective services =

U.S. agencies responsible for child protection

Child protective services (CPS) refers to government agencies in the United States that investigate allegations of child abuse or neglect, and if confirmed, intervene by providing services to the family through a safety plan, in-home monitoring, supervision, or if a safety plan is not feasible or in emergencies, removing the child from the custody of their parent or legal guardian.

Some areas use other names, often attempting to reflect more family-centered (as opposed to child-centered) practices, such as "Department of Children and Family Services" (DCFS). CPS is also sometimes known by the name "Department of Social Services" (DSS or simply Social Services), though these terms more often have a broader meaning. However, their function remains equivalent.

- Children, Youth, and Family – CYF
- Department of Children and Families – DCF
- Children and Youth Services' - CYS (Pennsylvania only)
- Department of Child Protection and Permanency - DCPP (New Jersey only)
- Administration for Children's Services - ACS (New York City only)

CPS/DCF is a department under a state's health and human services organization.

== Laws and standards ==
=== U.S. federal laws ===
U.S. federal laws that govern CPS agencies include:

- 42 U.S.C. Section 1983, and depending on the circumstances, 1985
- Adoption and Safe Families Act (ASFA)
- Child Abuse Prevention and Treatment Act (CAPTA)
- Indian Child Welfare Act (ICWA)
- Multi-Ethnic Placement Act (MEPA)
- Section 504 of the Rehabilitation Act
- Social Security Act
- Title II of the Americans with Disabilities Act of 1990 (ADA)

== History ==
In 1690, in what is now the Americas, there were criminal court cases involving child abuse. In 1692, states and municipalities identified care for abused and neglected children as the responsibility of local government and private institutions. In 1696, The Kingdom of England first used the legal principle of parens patriae, which gave the royal crown care of "charities, infants, idiots, and lunatics returned to the chancery". This principle of parens patriae has been identified as the statutory basis for U.S. governmental intervention in families' child rearing practices.

In 1825, states enacted laws giving social-welfare agencies the right to remove neglected children from their parents and from the streets. These children were placed in almshouses, in orphanages and with other families. In 1835, a humane society founded the National Federation of Child Rescue agencies to investigate child maltreatment. In the late-19th century, private child protection agencies—modeled after existing animal protection organizations—developed to investigate reports of child maltreatment, present cases in court, and advocate for child welfare legislation.

In 1853, the Children's Aid Society was founded in response to the problem of orphaned or abandoned children living in New York City. Rather than allow these children to become institutionalized or continue to live on the streets, the children were placed in the first "foster" homes, typically with the intention of helping these families work their farms as family labor.

In 1874, the first documented criminal case for child abuse originated from the story of eight-year-old Mary Ellen who was severely abused by her foster parents. Outrage over this case started an organized effort against child maltreatment Private organizations known as "anticruelty societies" such as The New York Society for the Prevention of Cruelty to Children (NYSPCC) which was formed to lobby for criminal statutes for child abuse, abandonment, and neglect. These "anticruelty societies" rapidly expanded to other cities nationwide, growing from 37 SPCCs in 1880 to 161 by 1902. State governments also took action in other ways. The state of New York passed a law protecting children in 1877. In 1909, President Theodore Roosevelt convened the White House Conference on Child Dependency, which created a publicly funded volunteer organization to "establish and publicize standards of child care". By 1926, 18 states had some version of county child welfare boards whose purpose was to coordinate public and private child related work. Issues of abuse and neglect were addressed in the Social Security Act in 1930, which provided funding for intervention for "neglected and dependent children in danger of becoming delinquent".

Child protection functions shifted from anticruelty societies to public agencies in the 1930s. By the mid-twentieth century, federal funding rules led to the conversion of the societies into the public Child Protective Services known today. In 1912, the federal children's bureau was established with a mandate that included services related to child maltreatment. In 1958, amendments to the Social Security Act mandated that states fund child protection efforts. In 1962, professional and media interest in child maltreatment was sparked by the publication of C. Henry Kempe and associates' "The battered child syndrome" in the JAMA. By the mid-1960s, in response to public concern that resulted from this article, 49 U.S. states passed child-abuse reporting laws. In 1974, these efforts by the states culminated in the passage of the federal Child Abuse Prevention and Treatment Act (CAPTA) providing federal funding for wide-ranging federal and state child-maltreatment research and services. In 1980, Congress passed the first comprehensive federal child protective services act, the Adoption Assistance and Child Welfare Act of 1980, which focused on family preservation efforts to help keep families together and children out of foster care or other out-of-home placement options.

Partly funded by the federal government, child protective services (CPS) agencies were first established in response to the 1974 CAPTA, which mandated that all states establish procedures to investigate suspected incidents of child maltreatment.

In the 1940s and 1950s, due to improved technology in diagnostic radiology, the medical profession began to take notice of what they believed to be intentional injuries, the so-called "shaken baby syndrome". In 1961, Kempe began to further research this issue, eventually identifying and coining the term battered child syndrome. At this same time, there were also changing views about the role of children in society, fueled in part by the Civil rights movement.

In 1973, Congress took the first steps toward enacting federal legislature to address the issues of poverty and minorities. The CAPTA was passed in 1974, which required states "to prevent, identify and treat child abuse and neglect".

Shortly thereafter, in 1978, the Indian Child Welfare Act (ICWA) was passed in response to attempts to destroy the Native Americans by taking large numbers of Native American children, separating them from their tribes and placing them in foster care or sending them to far away schools where many were maltreated, lost and some died. This legislation not only opened the door for consideration of cultural issues while stressing ideas that children should be with their families, leading to the beginnings of family preservation programs. In 1980, the Adoption Assistance and Child Welfare Act was introduced as a way to manage the high numbers of children in placement. Although this legislation addressed some of the complaints from earlier pieces of legislation around the elimination of due process for parents, these changes were not designed to alleviate the high numbers of children in placement or continuing delays in permanence. This led to the introduction of the home visitation models, which provided funding to private agencies to provide parents with intensive services as an alternative to adoption.

In addition to family services, the focus of federal child welfare policy changed to try to address permanence for the large numbers of foster children care. Several pieces of federal legislation attempted to ease the process of adoption and taking away parental rights, including incentives for adoption and removal with the Adoption Assistance Act; the 1988 Child Abuse Prevention, Adoption, and Family Services Act; and the 1992 Child Abuse, Domestic Violence, Adoption, and Family Services Act. The 1994 Multi-Ethnic Placement Act, which was revised in 1996 to add the Interethnic Placement Provisions, also attempted to promote permanency through adoption, creating regulations that adoptions could not be delayed or denied due to issues of parental rights, the children's right, discrimination, race, color, or national origin of the child or the adoptive parent.

All of these policies led up to the 1997 Adoption and Safe Families Act (ASFA), much of which guides current practice. Changes in the Adoptions and Safe Families Act shifted the emphasis towards children's health and safety concerns and away from a policy of reuniting children with their birth parents without regard to prior abusiveness. This law requires counties to provide "reasonable efforts" to preserve or reunify families, but required that states move to terminate parental rights for children who had been in foster care for 15 out of the last 22 months, with several exceptions.

== Comparison to other similar systems ==
=== Brazil ===
For decades, before 1990, there had been pressure from NGOs and children's organizations for protecting children battered by poverty and hunger and despised by sections of the community in Brazil. After this, became a chapter on the rights of children and adolescents in the Constitution of the Federative Republic of Brazil. In 1990, an even greater victory, when the Statute of the Child and Adolescent was approved ligating the government to protect child rights. This ensured a comprehensive child welfare system in Brazil. To ensure that the statute's provisions are enforced, councils for the rights of the child and adolescent were set up at federal, state and local levels.

The National Council for the Rights of Children and Adolescents (CONANDA) is a federal authority. The councils of guardianship are the local authorities and have duties and responsibilities towards children in their area. All work is based in the Statute of the Child and Adolescents (Law No. 8,069, July 13, 1990).

=== Canada ===
In Ontario, services are provided by independent children's aid societies. The societies receive funding from, and are under the supervision of the Ministry of Children, Community and Social Services. However, they are regarded as a non-governmental organization (NGO) which allows the CAS a large degree of autonomy from interference or direction in the day-to-day running of CAS by the ministry. The Child and Family Services Review Board exists to investigate complaints against CAS and maintains authority to act against the societies.

The federal government passed Bill C-92—officially known as An Act Respecting First Nations, Inuit and Métis Children, Youth and Families—in June 2019 coming into force on January 1, 2020. The new legislation creates national standards on how Indigenous children are to be treated. For example, when looking to place kids in foster care, authorities are to prioritize extended family and home communities. The law also allows Indigenous communities to create their own child welfare laws. Indigenous children make up 7% of Canada's population, but represent about 50% of youth in care.

=== Costa Rica ===
The Patronato Nacional de la Infancia (PANI) is responsible for child protection in Costa Rica.

The agency was founded in 1930 by Luis Felipe Gonzalez Flores, a Costa Rican magnate at the time. It was founded to combat infant mortality, that at the time, was rampant in Costa Rica. The idea was to put infants up for adoption that the mother could not afford to support (abortion is a crime in Costa Rica).

In 1949, after the Costa Rican Civil War, a new constitution was written, it called for the agency to be an autonomous institution in the government, autonomous from any ministry.

Today the focus is on the UN Convention on the Rights of the Child. The agency still favors adoption, since abortion is illegal in Costa Rica.

=== United Kingdom ===
The United Kingdom has a comprehensive child protection system under which local authorities have duties and responsibilities towards children in need in their area. This covers provision of advice and services, accommodation and care of children who become uncared for, and also the capacity to initiate proceedings for the removal of children from their parents care/care proceedings. The criteria for the latter is "significant harm" which covers physical, sexual and emotional abuse and neglect. In appropriate cases the care plan before the court will be for adoption. The local authorities also run adoption services both for children put up for adoption voluntarily and those becoming available for adoption through court proceedings.

The basic legal principle in all public and private proceedings concerning children, under the Children Act 1989, is that the welfare of the child is paramount. In recognition of attachment issues, social work good practice requires a minimal number of moves and the 1989 Children Act enshrines the principle that delay is inimical to a child's welfare. Care proceedings have a time frame of 26 weeks (although capable of extension under certain circumstances) and concurrent planning is required. The final care plan put forward by the local authority is required to provide a plan for permanence, whether with parents, family members, long-term foster parents or adopters. The court routinely joins children as parties to their own care proceedings, and their best interests are explored and advanced by children's guardians, independent social workers who specialise in representation of children in proceedings. It is a feature of care proceedings that judges of all levels are expected to adhere to the recommendations of the children's guardian unless there are cogent reasons not to. Nevertheless, "drift" and multiple placements still occur as many older children are difficult to place or maintain in placements. The 1989 Children Act created the role of Independent Visitor, a voluntary post, to befriend and assist children and young people in care.

In England, Wales and Scotland, there has never been a statutory obligation to report alleged child abuse to the police. However, both the Children Act 1989 and Children Act 2004 make clear a statutory obligation to all professionals to report suspected child abuse.

The statutory guidance Working Together to Safeguard Children 2006 created the role of "local authority designated officer". This officer is responsible for managing allegations of abuse against adults who work with children (teachers, social workers, church leaders, youth workers etc.).

Local Safeguarding Children Boards (LSCBs) are responsible for ensuring agencies and professionals, in their area, effectively safeguard and promote the welfare of children. In the event of the death or serious injury of a child, LSCBs can initiate a "Serious Case Review" aimed at identifying agency failings and improving future practice.

In May 2010, the planned ContactPoint database, under which information on children was to be shared between professionals, was halted by the newly elected coalition government. The database was aimed at improving information sharing across agencies. Lack of information sharing had been identified as a failing in numerous high-profile child death cases. Critics of the scheme claimed it was evidence of a "big brother state" and too expensive to introduce.

As of 2018, Working Together to Safeguard Children 2006, updated in 2010 and the subsequent The Protection of Children in England: A Progress Report (Laming, 2009) continued to promote the sharing of data between those working with vulnerable children.

A child in suitable cases can be made a ward of the court and no decisions about the child or changes in its life can be made without the leave of the High Court.

In 2003, the murder of Victoria Climbié was largely responsible for various changes in child protection in England, including the formation of the Every Child Matters programme in 2003. A similar programme, Getting it Right for Every Child – GIRFEC, was established in Scotland in 2008.

== Effects of early maltreatment of children ==
Children with histories of maltreatment, such as physical and psychological neglect, physical abuse, and sexual abuse, are at risk of developing psychiatric problems. Such children are at risk of developing a disorganized attachment. Disorganized attachment is associated with a number of developmental problems, including dissociative symptoms, as well as depressive, anxiety, and acting-out symptoms. Abuse and neglect also affect children and youth social and emotional development due to the negative effect they have on children's cognitive development.

== Standards for reporting in the U.S. ==
Generally speaking, a report must be made when an individual knows or has reasonable cause to believe or suspect that a child has been subjected to abuse or neglect. These standards guide mandatory reporters in deciding whether to make a report to child protective services. This has included marijuana involvement. However, due to the policy of the business to protect the identity of the reporter many reports have been made due to conflict with other parents or hospitals/doctors being sued by parents concerned with the way their child's needs have been addressed.

=== Persons responsible for the child ===
In addition to defining acts or omissions that constitute child abuse or neglect, several states' statutes provide specific definitions of persons who can get reported to child protective services as perpetrators of abuse or neglect. These are persons who have some relationship or regular responsibility for the child. This generally includes parents, grandparents, guardians, foster parents, relatives, legal guardians or bystanders. Once taken away from home, the stated goal of CPS is to reunite the child with their family. In some cases, due to the nature of abuse children are not able to see or converse with the abusers or those complicit in the abuse. There is a correlation with domestic violence and child abuse; some studies suggesting 30% to 60% of men who participate in domestic violence also participate in child abuse. This can complicate reporting and court proceedings. If caregivers fail to complete Court Ordered terms and conditions, the children in care may never return home. Most terms and conditions are set by the CPS caseworkers, not the courts.

== Child Protective Services statistics ==
The United States government's Administration for Children and Families reported that in 2004 approximately 3.5 million children were involved in investigations of alleged abuse or neglect in the U.S., while an estimated 872,000 children were determined to have been abused or neglected, and an estimated 1,490 children died that year because of abuse or neglect. In 2007, 1,760 children died as the result of child abuse and neglect. Child abuse impacts the most vulnerable populations, with children under age five years accounting for 76% of fatalities. In 2008, 8.3 children per 1000 were victims of child abuse and neglect and 10.2 children per 1000 were in out of home placement.

On September 30, 2010, there were approximately 400,000 children in foster care in the U.S. of which 36% percent were ages 5 and under. During that same period, almost 120,000 birth to five year-olds entered foster care and a little under 100,000 exited foster care. U.S. child protective services (CPS) received a little over 2.5 million reports of child maltreatment in 2009 of which 61.9% were assigned to an investigation. Research using national data on recidivism indicates that 22% of children were rereported within a two-year period and that 7% of these rereports were substantiated. In 2016, CPS within the state of Rhode Island demonstrated 2,074 cases of abuse or neglect among a population of 223,956 children. On September 30, 2025, there were approximately 337,049 children in foster care in the U.S.

As reported in September 2014, 264,7462 children nationally were removed from their families according to the federal government Adoption and Foster Care Analysis and Reporting System. The number of entries has fallen, with 175,008 children reportedly entering foster care in 2025.

From August 1999 – August 2019, 9,073,607 American children were removed from their families and placed in foster homes according to the federal government Adoption and Foster Care Analysis and Reporting System.

=== Child protective services recidivism in the United States ===
Two often-used terms in CPS recidivism are re-report (also known as re-referral) and recurrence. Either of the two can occur after an initial report of child abuse or neglect called an index report. Although the definitions of re-report and recurrence are not consistent, the general difference is that a re-report is a subsequent report of child abuse or neglect after an initial report (also known as an index report) whereas recurrence refers to a confirmed (also known as substantiated) re-report after an initial report of child abuse and neglect. Borrowing from the definition used by Pecora et al. (2000), recidivism is defined as, "Recurring child abuse and neglect, the subsequent or repeated maltreatment of a child after identification to public authorities." This definition is not all-inclusive because it does not include abused children who are not reported to authorities.

=== Recidivism statistics ===
There are three main sources of recidivism data in the U.S.—the NCANDS, the NSCAW, and the NIS—and they all have their own respective strengths and weaknesses. The NCANDS was established in 1974, and it consists of administrative data of all reports of suspected child abuse and neglect investigated by CPS. The NSCAW was established in 1996 and is similar to the NCANDS in that it only includes reports of child abuse and neglect investigated by CPS, but it adds clinical measures related to child and family well-being that the NCANDS is lacking. The NIS was established in 1974, and it consists of data collected from CPS as well. However, it attempts to gather a more comprehensive picture of the incidence of child abuse and neglect by collecting data from other reporting sources called "community sentinels".

== Criticism ==
=== Texas ===
Since 2004, the Texas Department of Family and Protective Services had itself been an object of reports of unusual numbers of poisonings, deaths, rapes and pregnancies of children under its care. The Texas Family and Protective Services Crisis Management Team was created by executive order after the critical report Forgotten Children of 2004.

In late 2010 or early 2011, doctors became aware that two out of three children in a family had very small rib fractures. The doctors called CPS and it was agreed the parents could still have full custody until further notice, but that all three children would stay with relatives until an investigation was complete. However, soon after, for no apparent reason the people at CPS in charge of the case held a hearing with a judge about whether the parents should still have custody. People at CPS did not tell the parents or their attorney about the hearing, and they did not tell the judge the children had already been removed from the home. The judge took away the parents' custody, so the children could be removed from the home – he thought the situation was an emergency. People at CPS waited until business hours were nearly over to tell the parents they had lost custody. The parents and their attorney hired a medical professional who testified that the very small rib fractures, which had no evidence of internal bleeding or bruising, could have been from accidents. Eventually, the same judge who took away custody based on misinformation ordered CPS to pay $32,000, and he ordered the people in charge of the case to write a report about when they are and are not allowed to have a custody hearing. It is rare, but not unheard of, for CPS to be punished by a court in Texas.

==== 2008 Raid of YFZ Ranch ====
In April 2008, the largest child protection action in American history raised questions as the CPS in Texas removed hundreds of minor children, infants, and women incorrectly believed to be children from the YFZ Ranch polygamist community, with the assistance of heavily armed police with an armored personnel carrier. Investigators, including supervisor Angie Voss convinced a judge that all of the children were at risk of child abuse because they were all being groomed for under-age marriage. The state supreme court disagreed, releasing most children back to their families. Investigations would result in criminal charges against some men in the community.

Gene Grounds of Victim Relief Ministries commended CPS workers in the Texas operation as exhibiting compassion, professionalism and caring concern. However, CPS performance was questioned by workers from the Hill Country Community Mental Health-Mental Retardation Center. One wrote "I have never seen women and children treated this poorly, not to mention their civil rights being disregarded in this manner" after assisting at the emergency shelter. Others who were previously forbidden to discuss conditions working with CPS later produced unsigned written reports expressed anger at the CPS traumatizing the children, and disregarding rights of mothers who appeared to be good parents of healthy, well-behaved children. CPS threatened some MHMR workers with arrest, and the entire mental health support was dismissed the second week due to being "too compassionate". Workers believed poor sanitary conditions at the shelter allowed respiratory infections and chicken pox to spread.

==== Reports of problems within CPS ====
The Texas Department of Family and Protective Services, as with other states, had itself been an object of reports of unusual numbers of poisonings, death, rapes and pregnancies of children under its care since 2004. The Texas Family and Protective Services Crisis Management Team was created by executive order after the critical report Forgotten Children of 2004. Texas Comptroller Carole Keeton Strayhorn made a statement in 2006 about the Texas foster care system. In Fiscal 2003, 2004 and 2005, respectively 30, 38 and 48 foster children died in the state's care. The number of foster children in the state's care increased 24 percent to 32,474 in Fiscal 2005, while the number of deaths increased 60 percent. Compared to the general population, a child is four times more likely to die in the Texas foster care system. In 2004, about 100 children were treated for poisoning from medications; 63 were treated for rape that occurred while under state care, including four-year-old twin boys, and 142 children gave birth, though others believe Ms. Strayhorn's report was not scientifically researched, and that major reforms need to be put in place to assure that children in the conservatorship of the state get as much attention as those at risk in their homes.

Former Georgia Senator Nancy Schaefer was a vocal critic of the corruption that the Adoption and Safe Families Act incentivized in all child protection organizations. She argued that the thousands of dollars in adoption bonuses for every child adopted out rewarded such organizations with seizing children from and thwarting reunification efforts with the children's parents.

=== Disproportionality and disparity in the child welfare system ===
In the United States, data suggests that a disproportionate number of minority children, particularly African American and Native American children, enter the foster care system. National data in the United States provides evidence that disproportionality may vary throughout the course of a child's involvement with the child welfare system. Differing rates of disproportionality are seen at key decision points including the reporting of abuse, substantiation of abuse, and placement into foster care. Additionally, once they enter foster care, research suggests that they are likely to remain in care longer. Research has shown that there is no difference in the rate of abuse and neglect among minority populations when compared to Caucasian children that would account for the disparity. The juvenile justice system has also been challenged by disproportionate negative contact of minority children. Some literature suggests disproportionate state interefence into marginalized families reinforces existing disparities. Because of the overlap in these systems, it is likely that this phenomenon within multiple systems may be related.

Other scholars have pointed out that these recorded disparities emerge from the history, structure, and nature of child welfare institutions today. Professor Elizabeth D. Katz of the University of Florida Levin College of Law conducted a historical survey of the development of child placement systems in the United States from the colonial era. The study confirmed the extensive participation of faith-based organizations in the formation of early orphanages and pieced together historical sources to show how private institutions created a system that exacerbated disparities in the quality of services available to dependent children depending on their religion, race, or gender. Because of the overlap in these systems, it is likely that this phenomenon within multiple systems may be related.

The American Journal of Public Health estimate that 37.4% of all children experience a child protective services investigation by age 18 years. Consistent with previous literature, they found a higher rate for African American children (53.0%) and the lowest rate for Asians and Pacific Islanders (10.2%). They conclude child maltreatment investigations are more common than is generally recognized when viewed across the lifespan. Building on other recent work, such data suggest a critical need for increased preventative and treatment resources in the area of child maltreatment.

=== Constitutional issues ===
In May 2007, the United States Court of Appeals for the Ninth Circuit found in Rogers v. County of San Joaquin, No. 05-16071 that a CPS social worker who removed children from their natural parents into foster care without obtaining judicial authorization was acting without due process and without exigency (emergency conditions) violated the 14th Amendment and Title 42 United States Code Section 1983. The Fourteenth Amendment to the United States Constitution says that a state may not make a law that abridges "... the privileges or immunities of citizens of the United States" and no state may "deprive any person of life, liberty, or property, without due process of law; nor deny to any person within its jurisdiction the equal protection of the laws". 42 U.S.C. § 1983 states that citizens can sue in federal courts any person who acting under a color of law to deprive the citizens of their civil rights under the pretext of a regulation of a state.

In the case of Santosky v. Kramer, 455 US 745 (1982), the Supreme Court reviewed a case when the Department of Social Services removed two younger children from their natural parents only because the parents had been previously found negligent toward their oldest daughter. When the third child was only three days old, the DSS transferred him to a foster home on the ground that immediate removal was necessary to avoid imminent danger to his life or health. The Supreme Court vacated previous judgment and stated: "Before a State may sever completely and irrevocably the rights of parents in their natural child, due process requires that the State support its allegations by at least clear and convincing evidence. But until the State proves parental unfitness, the child and their parents share a vital interest in preventing erroneous termination of their natural relationship."

In the case of In re TJ (1995), the District of Columbia Court of Appeals concluded that the lower trial court erred in rejecting the relative custodial arrangement selected by the natural mother who tried to preserve her relationship with the child. The previous judgment granting the foster mother's adoption petition was reversed, the case remanded to the trial court to vacate the orders granting adoption and denying custody, and to enter an order granting custody to the child's relative.

The Sixth Amendment to the United States Constitution requires an accused citizen to identify their accuser. However, Child Protective Services laws prevent an accused citizen from knowing key information regarding their accuser and the accusations made against them.

=== Notable lawsuits ===
In 2010, an ex-foster child was awarded $30 million by jury trial in Santa Clara County, California for sexual abuse damages that happened to him in foster home from 1995 to 1999; he was represented by attorney Stephen John Estey. The foster parent, John Jackson, was licensed by state despite the fact that he abused his own wife and son, overdosed on drugs and was arrested for drunken driving. In 2006, Jackson was convicted in Santa Clara County of nine counts of lewd or lascivious acts on a child by force, violence, duress, menace and fear and seven counts of lewd or lascivious acts on a child under 14, according to the Santa Clara County District Attorney's Office. The sex acts he forced the children in his foster care to perform sent him to prison for 220 years. Later in 2010, Giarretto Institute, the private foster family agency responsible for licensing and monitoring Jackson's foster home and others, also was found to be negligent and liable for 75 percent of the abuse that was inflicted on the victim, and Jackson was liable for the rest. This was a landmark case that has since set a precedent in future proceedings against the Department of Children and Families.

In 2009, the Oregon Department of Human Services agreed to pay $2 million into a fund for the future care of twins who were allegedly abused by their foster parents; it was the largest such settlement in the agency's history. According to the civil rights suit filed on request of twins' adoptive mother in December 2007 in U.S. Federal Court, children were kept in makeshift cages—cribs covered with chicken wire secured by duct tape—in a darkened bedroom known as "the dungeon". The brother and sister often went without food, water or human touch. The boy, who had a shunt put into his head at birth to drain fluid, did not receive medical attention, so when police rescued the twins he was nearly comatose. The same foster family previously took in their care hundreds of other children over nearly four decades. The DHS said the foster parents deceived child welfare workers during the checkup visits.

Several lawsuits were brought in 2008 against the Florida Department of Children & Families (DCF), accusing it of mishandling reports that Thomas Ferrara, 79, a foster parent, was molesting girls. The suits claimed that though there were records of sexual misconduct allegations against Ferrara in 1992, 1996, and 1999, the DCF continued to place foster children with Ferrara and his wife until 2000. Ferrara was arrested in 2001 after a nine-year-old girl told detectives he regularly molested her over two years and threatened to hurt her mother if she told anyone. Records show that Ferrara had as many as 400 children go through his home during his 16 years as a licensed foster parent from 1984 to 2000. Officials stated that the lawsuits over Ferrara end up costing the DCF almost $2.26 million. Similarly, in 2007, Florida's DCF paid $1.2 million to settle a lawsuit that alleged the DCF ignored complaints that another mentally challenged Immokalee girl was being raped by her foster father, Bonifacio Velazquez, until the 15-year-old gave birth to a child.

In 1999, a class action lawsuit Charlie and Nadine H. v. Christie was filed in federal court by "Children's Rights" a national advocacy group working to reform child welfare. According to their website, "Children’s Rights filed this class action lawsuit in 1999 on behalf of more than 11,000 children in New Jersey’s child welfare system." The case resulted in court-ordered improvements. After continued advocacy and a contempt motion against the state, "In January of 2006...Governor Corzine announced the creation of a new cabinet-level children’s agency..."

Children's Rights further publishes that, "Since then, New Jersey has made significant progress in implementing the first phase of the massive reform effort. DYFS is recruiting and licensing more foster parents; caseworkers are better trained and have more manageable caseloads; and in 2007 New Jersey broke its own record for the most adoptions finalized in one year. However, significant challenges lie ahead..."

In 2007, with Shawn McMillan as her lead trial attorney, Deanna Fogarty-Hardwick obtained a jury verdict against Orange County, California and two of its social workers for violating her Fourteenth Amendment rights to familial association. The $4.9 million verdict grew to a $9.5 million judgment as the county lost each of its successive appeals. The case finally ended in 2011 when the United States Supreme Court denied Orange County's request to overturn the verdict. During the appeals process it was argued by the defense attorneys that the caseworkers had a right to fabricate evidence and lie to the court in order to facilitate the continued removal of the child from her family. This case, which has come to be called the "right to lie" case set a precedent of how caseworkers can handle cases to which they are assigned. It was adamantly argued, by the defense, that caseworkers should be allowed to make up things in order to sway the judges decision to remove a child from his or her fit parents. The defense attorney even tried to justify the right of the caseworkers to lie saying that the statutes which cover perjury are "state statutes".

In 2018, Rafaelina Duval obtained a jury verdict against Los Angeles County, California and two of its social workers for an unwarranted seizure of her child. The board of supervisors approved a $6 million payout for Duval, who said her 15-month-old baby was seized by county social workers against her rights. Her son, Ryan, was taken on November 3, 2009, after social workers Kimberly Rogers and Susan Pender accused Duval of general neglect and intentionally starving the boy, according to a statement issued by Duval's attorney, Shawn McMillan, following the jury verdict. "The law is very clear and the social workers get training on this, you cannot seize a child from its parents unless there's an emergency," McMillan said.

In 2019, with the assistance of attorney McMillan, Rachel Bruno obtained an award against social services and Children's Hospital of Orange County (CHOC) after they took her 20-month-old son and ran unauthorized medical tests on him and injected him with a dozen vaccinations at the same time.

=== Illinois ===
Illinois Children and Family Services plays an important part in investigating and restoring children and families in order to better a society. As the Children Abused and Neglected Child Reporting Act of Illinois states, that upon receiving a report it is the responsibility of Department of Children and Families Services to conserve the health and safety of the child in any circumstances where the children experience abuse and neglect. Protective assistance to the child should be provided in order to maintain a proper mental health and psychological state for the child; which includes preserving family life whenever possible. Sadly, in the most extreme cases, child abuse results in the death of a child. In 2016, there were 64 child maltreatment deaths reported in Illinois—a rate of 2.19 per 100,000 children (U.S. DHHS, 2018). From 2012 to 2016, Illinois' reported annual maltreatment-related deaths have been as high as 105 and as low as 64, with a decrease every year since 2014.

==== CPS investigations, services and removals ====
CPS services differ in different states. In most states in the US CPS services include investigation, supports and safety plans to keep children with families, and removal with a plan of reunification if safety is unachievable with support. For a child to be removed from their family they must be in imminent danger or the family has not been able to keep the child safe by following the safety plan set up between them and CPS. Many calls made to CPS by mandated reporters or civilians are "evaluated out" meaning they do not rise to the level of CPS involvement. State laws differ with respect to the specific steps necessary to effect a removal and the required timeframe for the court hearing. At the hearing CPS must present factual evidence documenting risk to the child's safey serious enough to warrant separation. CPS workers have an ethical obligation to tell the truth and to work to protect children first and foremost. Most successful non-removal and reunification cases include the family actively using the child and family team facilitated by most agencies, and services offered to remedy what brought the family to the agency's attention. When a child is removed from the home the removing agency must make active efforts identify a relative or "kin of the heart" - unrelated but close adult - willing and able to be a safe caregiver while the family is working on reunification. If no kin meeting state regulations is identified, the child will be placed with a foster family who has been recruited and specially trained and who know that they are part of a team helping a child reunify with their family. The CPS department will establish a child and family team which includes the parents/guardians as well as the caregivers (be they kin or foster), and supports from the community, who will all work with the family to address CPS' concerns and establish a system of support for the family. The primary goal is reunification until a court determines that there must be an alternative goal for permanency for the child, typically at the recommendation of the CPS agency.

==== Perpetrators ====
The National Child Abuse and Neglect Data System (NCANDS) gathers and analyzes all screened-in referrals from the child protective services from all 50 states. It defines a perpetrator as someone who has caused or permitted the abuse and neglect of a child to have happened. As NCANDS data on 2018 shows, in Illinois, 17,431 out of 18,958 perpetrators, or 77%, are parents of their victims, 6.4 percent are relatives and 4.6 percent had a different relationship to the child^{3}. Within those numbers, 40 percent of the victims were abused and neglected by a mother acting alone and 21.5 percent by father acting alone^{3}. Compared to Wisconsin where 2,502 out of 2,753 perpetrators are parents of the victims. Alcohol abuse and drug abuse have been identified as major risk factors which will increase child maltreatment.^{3} Evidence shows that there is an increase of victims if parents consume drugs or alcohol.

==== Child protective services responsibilities and case load ====
States have different requirements for delivery child welfare services. Illinois Children and Family Services, for example, doesn't require a degree in social work and in many cases any degree beyond a high school diploma; calling these positions "social workers" is a misnomer. When child maltreatment is alleged, caseworkers complete investigations and assessments, and assist families and children in complicated situations. National Association of Social Workers sets professional standards for social workers in family support programs, parenting programs and family-based services. According to these standards, social workers must act ethically, in accord with service, social justice, integrity and respect toward the person. Furthermore, the standards emphasize the importance that a social worker should have on serving as an advocate for the physical health and mental health of the children, youth and their families. Moreover, social workers should be able to perform ongoing assessments to gather important information and intervene with adequate evidence in order to ensure safety of the child.

However, throughout the years, case workers have struggled with a lack of resources, large caseloads and poor education. Case workers have to perform screening, investigations and identify alternative responses. Some case workers might need to provide additional services depending on the number of coworkers in their agencies and resources. In 2018, NCANDS reported that Illinois has only 150 workers who perform intake and screening for child abuse and neglect, and only 953 workers that follow up on reports. This provides evidence that child welfare case workers may find their daily responsibilities to be challenging. Compared with Michigan that has 177 workers who perform intake and screening for child abuse and neglect, and 1,549 workers that follow up on reports.

In addition to the challenges of a lack of resources and large caseloads, the Office of Inspector General identified issues that hinder effective service delivery. Among individual professional social workers, cognitive fixation, knowledge deficit, and documentation burdens are problems. Among social worker teams, coordination and supervisory support are problems. And environmental conditions, such as policies, training, and service array can also be inadequate. Based on the U.S. Bureau of Labor Statistics individual and family services, social workers in 2018 had an annual mean wage of $42,972, which might be taken as a trivial amount compared to the amount of work that is needed from case workers. An example of fixable efforts is Annie E. Casey Foundation Human Services Workforce Initiative (AECF). The initiative focuses on recruiting and retaining case workers with training and support to provide an effective resource for children and their family. States are also engaged in different partnerships with colleges and universities to provide recruitment strategies that could attract students to find interest in the career of professional social work.

[1] Legislative Information System, Illinois General Assembly, Children Abused and Neglected Child Reporting Act Source: P.A. 79–65 http://www.ilga.gov/legislation/ilcs/ilcs3.asp?ActID=1460&ChapterID=32

[2] Weiner, D., & Cull, M. (2019). Systemic review of critical incidents in intact family services. Chicago, IL: Chapin Hall at the University of Chicago. https://www.chapinhall.org/wp-content/uploads/Systemic-Review-Critical-Incidents.pdf

[3] Social Work, Child and Family Social Workers https://www.socialwork.org/careers/child-and-family-social-worker/

[4] U.S. Department of Health & Human Services, Administration for Children and Families, Administration on Children, Youth and Families, Children's Bureau. (2020). Child Maltreatment 2018. [https://web.archive.org/web/20200221024459/https://www.acf.hhs.gov/sites/default/files/cb/cm2018.pdf#page=21 hhs.gov]

[5] National Association of Social Workers (2019) NASW Standards for Social Work Practice in Child Welfare https://www.socialworkers.org/LinkClick.aspx?fileticket=_FIu_UDcEac%3d&portalid=0

[6] U.S Bureau of Labor Statistics, Occupational Employment Statistics and Wages.https://www.bls.gov/oes/2018/may/oes211021.htm

[7] Social Work Policy Institute, Child Welfare. 2010 http://www.socialworkpolicy.org/research/child-welfare-2.html

== Effectiveness ==
In 2010, researchers published results of a 9 year nationwide study examining children in 595 families. They discovered that in the households where child abuse was substantiated by evidence, risk factors remained unchanged during interviews with the families. The study found that investigated subjects were not perceptibly different from noninvestigated subjects in social support, family functioning, poverty, maternal education, or child behavior problems after adjusting for baseline risk factors and that mothers of investigated subjects had more depressive symptoms than mothers of noninvestigated peers at the child's age of eight years.

== See also ==
- Aboriginal child protection
- Cinderella effect
- National Association of Social Workers
- Parenting coordinator

=== Similar organizations in other countries ===
- Bureau Jeugdzorg and Raad voor de Kinderbescherming — Netherlands
- Jugendamt — Germany and Austria
- Children and Family Court Advisory and Support Service — England and Wales
- Patronato Nacional de la Infancia — Costa Rica
- National Council for the Rights of Children and Adolescents (Conselho Nacional dos Direitos da Criança e do Adolescente – CONANDA) — Brazil
- Norwegian Child Welfare Services
- Oranga Tamariki — New Zealand
- Odisha State Child Protection Society — Odisha, India
- Children's Aid Society (Ontario), Canada
- State agency for child protection (Държавната агенция за закрила на детето) - Bulgaria

== Sources ==
- Drake, B. & Jonson-Reid, M. (2007). A response to Melton based on the Best Available Data. Published in: Child Abuse & Neglect, Volume 31, Issue 4, April 2007, Pages 343–360.
- Laird, David and Jennifer Michael (2006). "Budgeting Child Welfare: How will millions cut from the federal budget affect the child welfare system?" Published in: Child Welfare League of America, Children's Voice, Vol. 15, No. 4 (July/August 2006). Available on-line at: Child Welfare League of America: Childrens Voice.
- Pecora, Peter J., James K. Whittaker, Anthony N. Maluccio, with Richard P. Barth and Robert D. Plotnick (1992). The Child Welfare Challenge: Policy, Practice, and Research. NY:Aldine de Gruyter.
- Petr, Christopher G. (1998). Social Work with Children and their Families: Pragmatic Foundations. NY:Oxford University Press. ISBN 0-19-510607-5.
- Scott, Brenda (1994), "Out of Control. Who's Watching Our Child Protection Agencies?". Huntington House Publishers. ISBN paper. ISBN hardback.
