= Residential Tenancies Act =

Residential Tenancies Act may refer to legislation in various jurisdictions:

- Residential Tenancies Act (Alberta)
- Residential Tenancies Act, 2006 for the Ontario law
