= Animal Care Review Board =

Ontario, Canada agency

Animal Care Review Board _{Commission d'étude des soins aux animaux (French)}
Agency overview
- Type: Tribunal
- Jurisdiction: Province of Ontario
- Headquarters: 25 Grosvenor Street Toronto, Ontario
- Minister responsible: Attorney General of Ontario
- Parent agency: Tribunals Ontario
- Key document: Provincial Animal Welfare Services Act
- Website: tribunalsontario.ca/acrb/

The Animal Care Review Board (ACRB; French: Commission d'étude des soins aux animaux) is an independent, quasi-judicial agency in Ontario, Canada. It is one of 13 groups of adjudicative tribunals under the Ministry of the Attorney General that make up Tribunals Ontario.

The ACRB conducts hearings, hearing appeals of orders and decisions made by the Chief Animal Welfare Inspector and other animal welfare inspectors on disputes regarding animal welfare in Ontario.

== Authority ==
The role and authority of ACRB is mandated under the Provincial Animal Welfare Services Act, 2019 (PAWS), which allows inspectors to conduct risk-based inspections, reactively respond to urgent animal welfare concerns, and collect evidence to lay charges.

The Chief Animal Welfare Inspector (CAWI) is accountable to the Solicitor General, and is responsible for giving animal owners/custodians notices and taking action if necessary.

== Powers ==
After conducting a hearing, the ACRB may:

- change, confirm or cancel an order;
- return the animal to its rightful owner or custodian;
- reimburse costs to the owner or custodian by the Minister; and/or
- reimburse costs to the Chief Animal Welfare Inspector by the owner or custodian.
