= Rent control in Ontario =

Regulatory system in Ontario, Canada

Rent control in Ontario refers to a system of rent regulation in Ontario, Canada which limits the amount by which the rent paid by tenants for rental accommodation can increase. It applies to any unit that was first occupied for residential purposes before November 15, 2018.

== History ==
In 1940, the federal Wartime Prices and Trade Board was given the power to cap rents at the January 1940 amounts in 30 designated areas. In late 1941, the rent cap was extended to all of Canada. In response to a worsening housing shortage, the board imposed a general freeze on evictions in July 1945. After lobbying by business it was repealed in under a decade.

The modern history of rent controls began in July 1975 when the Residential Premises Rent Review Act 1975 was enacted after the demand for rent controls became a major issue in the period leading to the 1975 provincial election. In 1979, the Residential Tenancies Act was enacted.

In 1985, the new Liberal government tightened rent controls with the Residential Rent Regulation Act and in 1992 the New Democratic Party government of Bob Rae passed the Rent Control Act 1992.

In 1996, existing rent regulations in the province which provided for vacancy control were eliminated by the provincial government.

The Tenant Protection Act 1997 was enacted by the Progressive Conservative government of Mike Harris and proclaimed in June 1998. The Act retained selected rights and obligations contained in Part IV of the previous Landlord and Tenant Act. (Parts I, II, and III were retitled the Commercial Tenancies Act.) The Tenant Protection Act both repealed the Rent Control Act and removed the dispute resolution process of the Landlord Tenant Act, including evictions and rent increases, from the Ontario court system and assigned jurisdiction to a newly created quasi-judicial body, the Ontario Rental Housing Tribunal.

Under the TPA landlord applications for eviction were automatically granted without a hearing unless the tenant filed a notice of dispute within five days. This provision had been the subject of a complaint to the Ontario Ombudsman and was removed from the new Act.

The Tenant Protection Act was repealed and replaced by the Residential Tenancies Act, which received royal assent on June 22, 2006, and was proclaimed into law on January 31, 2007. The new act also created the Landlord and Tenant Board as a replacement for the Ontario Rental Housing Tribunal.

On April 20, 2017, Premier of Ontario Kathleen Wynne, along with Chris Ballard, Minister of Housing, announced the Fair Housing Plan. Until then, rent control in Ontario had only applied to units that were first built or occupied before November 1, 1991. If the rental unit was in an apartment building constructed (or converted from a non-residential use) after November 1, 1991, then the rent control provisions of the Residential Tenancies Act, 2006 did not apply. However, the Fair Housing Plan included a provision to roll back the post-1991 rent control exemption such that all private rental units, including ones built or first occupied on or after November 1, 1991, were to be subject to rent control. This change was effective from April 20, 2017, until November 15, 2018, shortly after a change in government.

== Current law ==
Premier of Ontario Doug Ford's Conservative Government enacted legislation in 2018 such that rent control only applies to rental units created and occupied prior to November 15, 2018. It does not apply to new buildings, additions to existing buildings and most new basement apartments that are occupied for the first time for residential purposes after November 15, 2018.

The sections of the Residential Tenancies Act unrelated to rent control still govern landlord and tenant relations in residential rental accommodations for properties that are exempt from rent control.

== Annual rent increase guideline ==
Since 1975, rent increases have been capped based on the Ontario Consumer Price Index (currently also capped at 2.5%).

View chart definition.

== See also ==
- Affordable housing in Canada
- Rent regulation
- Rent regulation in Canada
- Rent control in British Columbia
- Rent control in England and Wales
