= Ontario Social Benefits Tribunal =

Social Benefits Tribunal _{Tribunal de l’aide sociale (French)}
Agency overview
- Type: Tribunal
- Jurisdiction: Province of Ontario
- Headquarters: 25 Grosvenor Street Toronto, Ontario
- Minister responsible: Attorney General of Ontario
- Parent agency: Tribunals Ontario
- Key document: Ontario Works Act
- Website: tribunalsontario.ca/sbt

The Ontario Social Benefits Tribunal (SBT) is an adjudicative tribunal in the province of Ontario, Canada. It is one of the 13 adjudicative tribunals overseen by the Ministry of the Attorney General that make up Tribunals Ontario.

== Authority ==
The SBT is empowered to hear appeals of administrative decisions related to social assistance and was created under the Ontario Works Act. The members of the tribunal are appointed by the Lieutenant Governor in Council. Members of the SBT are empowered to hear cases in person or in writing. All hearings of the SBT are private.

The SBT may hear appeals under the Ontario Works Act as well as the Ontario Disability Support Program Act.
