= Law Enforcement Complaints Agency =

Civilian oversight agency in Ontario, Canada

- Agence des plaintes contre les forces de l'ordre

Agency overview
- Formed: 2008
- Preceding agency: Office of the Independent Police Review Director (OIPRD)
- Headquarters: 655 Bay Street Toronto, Ontario
- Minister responsible: Doug Downey, Attorney General
- Agency executive: Stephen Leach, Director
- Key documents: Police Services Act; Community Safety and Policing Act
- Website: leca.ca

The Law Enforcement Complaints Agency (LECA; French: Agence des plaintes contre les forces de l'ordre) is an independent civilian oversight agency that handles public complaints regarding police conduct in the Canadian province of Ontario. The agency oversees municipal police services and the Ontario Provincial Police.

== Overview ==
The Law Enforcement Complaints Agency (LECA) was formerly called the Office of the Independent Police Review Director (OIPRD). LECA's specific mandate is receiving, managing and overseeing all public complaints about municipal, regional and provincial police in Ontario; as such, First Nations police, special constables and provincial offences officers (bylaw enforcement), and federal agencies such as the Royal Canadian Mounted Police (RCMP) are not subject to review by the agency (though most are subject to a similar oversight body). As an independent civilian oversight agency, the OIPRD makes sure public complaints about police are dealt with in a manner that is transparent, effective and fair to both the public and the police.

Created in 2008 by the Independent Police Review Act, 2007 (which amended Part V of the Police Services Act), the agency is headquartered in Toronto.

Statutory authority for the OIPRD currently derives from Part II.1 of the Police Services Act. Once the Community Safety and Policing Act, 2019 (CSPA) comes into force, OIPRD will be governed by Part VIII of CSPA. Like the Special Investigations Unit (SIU), the OIPRD reports to the attorney general of Ontario.

Members of the agency cannot be serving police officers, and the director cannot be a former or current police officer.

== Changes to police oversight ==
The Community Safety and Policing Act, 2019, which received royal assent on March 26, 2019, will impact OIPRD in several ways once it comes into force.

- The OIPRD will be renamed the Law Enforcement Complaints Agency (LECA) and the Independent Police Review Director will become the Complaints Director.
- The new agency will receive and manage conduct complaints involving sworn police officers as well as special constables employed by the Niagara Parks Commission and the Peace Officers of the Legislative Protective Service.
- Policy and service complaints will all be referred to the newly created Inspector General, as will complaints about police services board members.
- First Nations Police services will be able to opt-in to the public complaints process.
- The Complaints Director will conduct the investigations of public complaints about police chiefs and deputy chiefs, the OPP Commissioner, deputy commissioners and peace officers of the Legislative Protective Service, and any other complaints determined to be in the public interest.
- All other complaints will be referred back to either the police service from which they originated or another police service.
- The Complaints Director will have the power to initiate an investigation into an incident even if there is no public complaint.
- All investigations are expected to be completed within 120 days.
- The Complaints Director will continue to conduct systemic reviews.
- The Ontario Police Arbitration and Adjudication Commission will be created and will be responsible for conducting disciplinary hearings. The commission will also be responsible for posting hearing decisions to a public website.

== List of directors ==
- Gerry McNeilly (June 2008–March 2019)
- Sylvana Capogreco (April 2019 – 2020)
- Stephen Leach (April 2020–present)

== See also ==
- Ontario Civilian Police Commission
- Special Investigations Unit
