= Tribunals Ontario =

Umbrella organization of adjudicative tribunals in Ontario, Canada.

- French: Tribunaux décisionnels Ontario
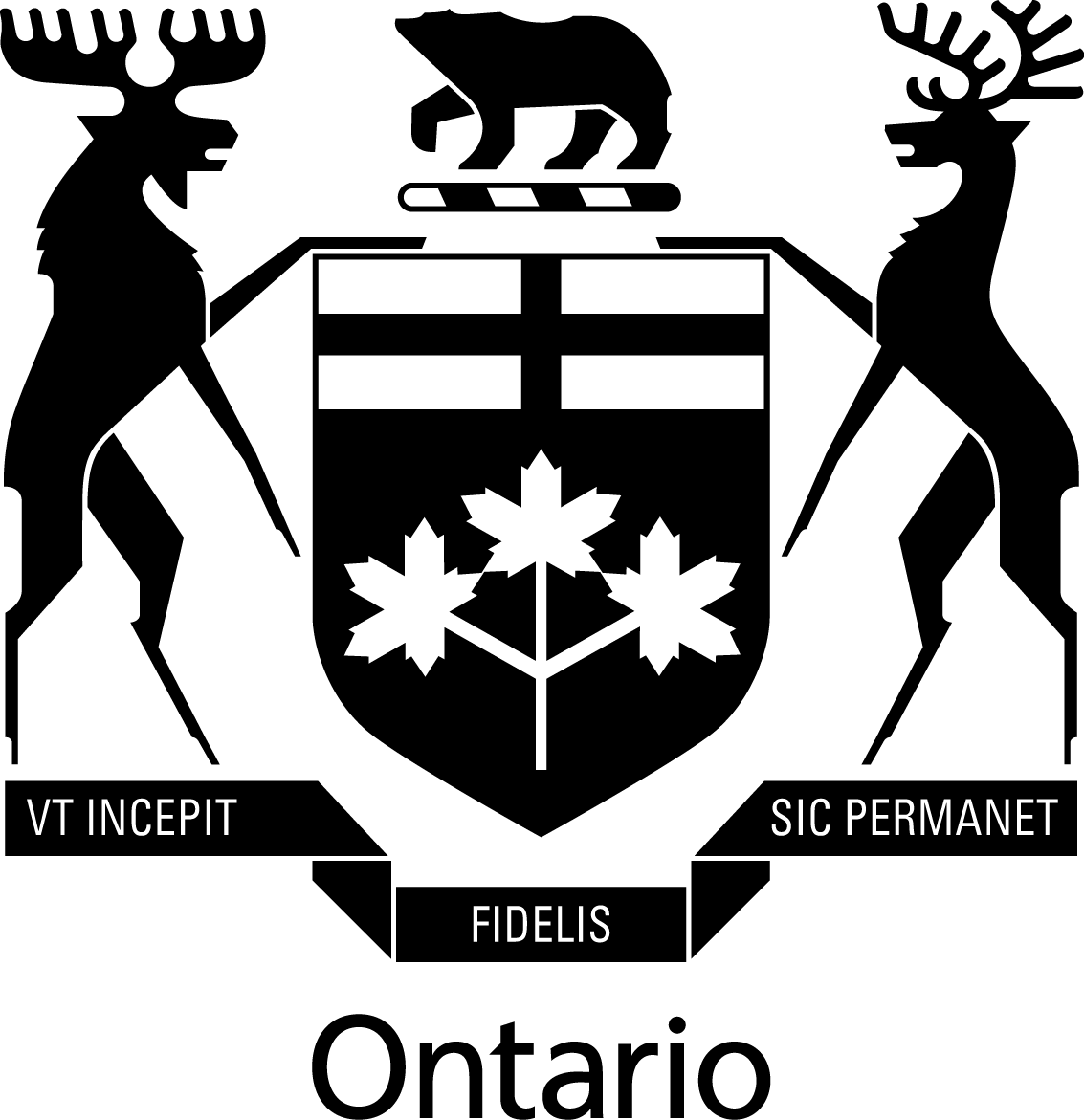
- Arms of the Government of Ontario

Agency overview
- Formed: January 1, 2019
- Preceding agencies: Social Justice Tribunals Ontario; Environment and Land Tribunals Ontario; Safety, Licensing Appeals and Standards Tribunals Ontario
- Headquarters: 25 Grosvenor Street; Toronto, Ontario
- Minister responsible: Attorney General of Ontario
- Agency executive: Sean Weir, Executive Chair Harry Gousopoulos, Executive Director
- Website: tribunalsontario.ca

Tribunals Ontario (French: Tribunaux décisionnels Ontario) is the umbrella organization for 12 adjudicative tribunals under the Ministry of the Attorney General of Ontario. It was formed on January 1, 2019, from the merger of the Social Justice Tribunals Ontario; Environment and Land Tribunals Ontario; and Safety, Licensing Appeals and Standards Tribunals Ontario tribunal "clusters".

== Tribunals ==
Tribunals are independent, specialized governmental agencies that function at arm's length from government. Tribunals in Canada are subject to judicial review, where a superior court can quash a tribunal's decision if the tribunal exceeds the limits of its statutory authority. In Ontario, decisions by provincial tribunals are subject to review by the Divisional Court branch of the Ontario Superior Court of Justice to determine they are fair, reasonable, and lawful.

=== List ===
Tribunals Ontario consists of the:

- Assessment Review Board
- Animal Care Review Board
- Child and Family Services Review Board
- Custody Review Board
- Fire Safety Commission
- Human Rights Tribunal of Ontario
- Landlord and Tenant Board
- Licence Appeal Tribunal
- Ontario Civilian Police Commission
- Ontario Parole Board
- Ontario Special Education Tribunals (separate tribunals for English and French)
- Social Benefits Tribunal
