= Rent control in British Columbia =

In British Columbia, rent control limits the amount by which a landlord is allowed to raise their tenants' rent each year. The provincial government sets an annual limit defined as a percentage of the rent the tenant paid previously. In 2025, the limit was set to 3.0%.

In some circumstances, exceptions are made for landlords to increase rent above the annual limit, such as to cover higher operating costs or legally required capital investments.

== Current law ==
In British Columbia, the government places a limit on the amount by which a landlord can increase a tenant's rent each year (12 months after the tenant first moved into the property, or 12 months after the last time the landlord increased their rent). The limit is defined as a percentage of the tenant's previous rent. This annual increase limit is set by the Housing Minister. In 2025, the government of British Columbia set the maximum annual rent increase to 3.0% of the tenant's previous monthly rent.

Rent increases in the province are regulated by the BC Residential Tenancy Act. In addition to defining the annual increase limit, the Act grants landlords the opportunity to apply for an exception they can use to increase a tenant's rent further. In any case, the landlord must give the tenant 3 month's notice before increasing their rent.

Regulations limiting a landlord's ability to raise rent only apply to existing leases. If a tenant is negotiating a new lease with their landlord, such as to add a new tenant to the lease, the rent becomes whatever is agreed upon in the new lease.

A tenant is not required to pay increased rent if their rent is increased illegally. If a landlord tries to action an illegal rent increase (for example, by serving the tenant an eviction notice after they've chosen not to pay it), then the tenant can file a dispute. Tenants who've paid an illegal rent increase have the option of underpaying their landlord the following month or applying for a monetary order by going through the dispute process.

=== Increase in operating costs ===
Landlords may have an opportunity to increase their tenant's rent if operating costs have changed such that they are operating at a loss. This exception is only granted if the annual increase won't already cover the new operating cost, and the landlord needs to be able to prove it before the increase can come into effect. This exception is rarely granted in practice.

=== Capital investment ===
If a landlord has invested in the property, they may be able to receive an exception to increase rent beyond the annual increase limit. This is typically related to a capital expense, such as something being added to the property, or major repairs.

Such investments have to have been made in order to make the property compliant with health and safety regulations. Investing in the property in order to reduce energy use or greenhouse gas emissions is also considered a valid reason for this exception in BC. In the case of repairs, if the repairs are a result of the landlord's failure to maintain the property in the first place, they cannot raise rent to cover the cost.

The amount by which the landlord is able to increase rent is equal to the amount they spent spread out over a period of ten years.

=== Voluntary agreement ===
A tenant may voluntarily agree to accept a higher rent. This agreement must be completed in writing with a Notice of Rent Increase. In this case, the tenant still needs three month's notice before the increase can go into effect, and these agreements can also happen at most once a year.

=== Tenants of non-profit housing ===
The rules for rent increases described in the Residential Tenancy Act do not apply to tenants living in public housing. Rent paid by tenants living in public housing is related to the tenant's income.

== Previous rent caps ==
The following table lists the maximum amount a tenant's rent can be increased per year as a percentage of their previous rent:

Year	Percent
2027	2.2%
2026	2.3%
2025	3.0%
2024	3.5%
2023	2.0%
2022	1.5%
2021	0.0%
2020	2.6%
2019	2.5%
2018	4.0%
2017	3.7%
2016	2.9%
2015	2.5%
2014	2.2%
2013	3.8%
2012	4.3%
2011	2.3%
2010	3.2%
2009	3.7%
2008	3.7%
2007	4.0%
2006	4.0%
2005	3.9%
2004	4.6%
2003	3.7%

== See also ==
- Affordable housing in Canada
- Rent regulation in Canada
- Rent control in Ontario
