= Ontario Special Education Tribunals =

Quasi-judicial agencies in Ontario, Canada

Agency overview
- Type: Tribunal
- Jurisdiction: Province of Ontario
- Headquarters: 25 Grosvenor Street Toronto, Ontario
- Minister responsible: Attorney General of Ontario
- Parent agency: Tribunals Ontario
- Website: tribunalsontario.ca/oset//

The Ontario Special Education Tribunals (OSET; OSET - English, for the English Public and Catholic school boards; OSET - French, for the French Public and Catholic school boards) are independent, quasi-judicial agencies in Ontario, Canada. They are two of 13 adjudicative tribunals under the Ministry of the Attorney General that make up Tribunals Ontario.

The OSETs hear appeals by parents and guardians who are not satisfied with the school board’s identification or placement of a child with exceptional learning needs.

== Authority ==
The OSETs only hear appeals after parents have completed all possible appeals under the Education Act at the school board level. The Education Act requires parents to “exhaust all rights of appeal” by going through the school board’s Identification and Placement Review Committee (IPRC) and a Special Education Appeal Board (SEAB) before making an appeal to the OSET. The OSETs are independent from all school boards, IPRCs, and SEABs, as well as the Ministry of Education.
