= Ontario Parole Board =

Ontario Parole Board _{Commission ontarienne des libérations conditionnelles (French)}
Agency overview
- Type: Tribunal
- Jurisdiction: Province of Ontario
- Headquarters: 25 Grosvenor Street Toronto, Ontario
- Minister responsible: Attorney General of Ontario
- Parent agency: Tribunals Ontario
- Website: tribunalsontario.ca/opb/

The Ontario Parole Board (OPB; French: Commission ontarienne des libérations conditionnelles) is an independent inquisitorial agency in Ontario, Canada. It is one of 13 adjudicative tribunals under the Ministry of the Attorney General that make up Tribunals Ontario.

The OPB is separate from the Parole Board of Canada, which can make parole decisions for individuals who are serving a sentence of 2 years or more.

== Authority ==
The OPB can grant, deny, revoke, and suspend parole under the Ministry of Correctional Services Act. Also, the Ontario Parole Board can also authorize the re-committal of parolees to custody, lift one's parole suspension, or cancel a temporary absence it has granted.

Parole is a conditional release from a correctional institution. If a parolee breaches a condition of their parole, then the parole may be suspended or revoked.

The OPB renders decisions for offenders serving a sentence of less than two years in an Ontario correctional institution and applications for temporary absences from correctional institutions for more than 72 hours.
