= William Henry Draper =

William Henry Draper may refer to:

- William Henry Draper (judge) (1801–1877), lawyer, judge and political figure in Upper Canada and Canada West
- William Henry Draper (congressman) (1841–1921), Republican from New York
- William Henry Draper Jr. (1894–1974), U.S. army officer, banker, and diplomat
- William Henry Draper III (born 1928), American businessman, son of William Henry Draper, Jr.
- William Henry Draper (hymnwriter) (1855–1933), British clergyman and hymnwriter

== See also ==
- William Draper (disambiguation)
