= Henry Draper (umpire) =

English cricket umpire

Personal information
- Born: 12 February 1847; Penshurst, Kent, England
- Died: 31 December 1896 (aged 49); Bromley, Kent, England
- Role: Umpire
- Relatives: William Draper (brother)

Domestic team information
- Years: Team
- Kent Colts
- Southborough

Umpiring information
- Tests umpired: 1 (1893)
- FC umpired: 65 (1886–1896)
- Source: CricketArchive, 17 June 2013

Henry Draper (12 February 1847 – 31 December 1896) was a cricket test match umpire, standing in the 1893 Ashes test at the Oval. Born in Kent in 1847, he died in 1896.
