= William Draper =

William Draper may refer to:

== Business ==
- William B. Draper (1804–1885), importer and president of the Flushing National Bank
- William Henry Draper Jr. (1894–1974), U.S. army officer, banker, and diplomat
- William Henry Draper III (1928 –2026), American businessman, son of William Henry Draper Jr
- William Draper Jr. (merchant) (1807–1886), Utah merchant

== Politics ==
- William Draper (MP) (1620–?), English politician
- William Henry Draper (1801–1877), lawyer, judge and political figure in Upper Canada and Canada West
- William Henry Draper (congressman) (1841–1921), U.S. Representative from New York
- William Franklin Draper (politician) (1842–1910), U.S. Representative from Massachusetts
- William G. Draper (1920–1964), U.S. Air Force officer and aide to President Dwight D. Eisenhower

== Other ==
- William Draper (British Army officer) (1721–1787), British lieutenant-general
- William Draper (cricketer) (1848–1919), English cricket player and umpire
- William Henry Draper (hymnwriter) (1855–1933), British clergyman, noted for "All Creatures of Our God and King"
- William Franklin Draper (artist) (1912–2003), American painter

== See also ==
- William Draper Best, 1st Baron Wynford, British politician and judge
- William Draper Harkins (1873–1951), American chemist
- William Draper Lewis (1867–1949), founder of the American Law Institute
- William Henry Draper (disambiguation)
