= Crown attorney =

Prosecutor in the Canadian legal system

Crown prosecutor
- Prosecutions in Canada are conducted in the name of the Crown

Occupation
- Synonyms: Crown counsel; Crown attorney
- Occupation type: Profession
- Activity sectors: Civil service, practice of law

Description
- Education required: Law degree (J.D./LL.B./B.C.L./LL.L.); Bar exam
- Related jobs: Defence counsel, lawyer, judge

Criminal prosecutions in Canada are handled by public officials at both the federal and the provincial level. The names for the position vary with the jurisdiction, such as Crown prosecutor, Crown attorney, and Crown counsel.

The officials represent the state, hence are generally referred to as the Crown in court. Although the criminal law is enacted by the federal Parliament, most prosecutions under the two main criminal statutes, the Criminal Code and the Youth Criminal Justice Act, are conducted by provincial prosecutors. Criminal prosecutions under other federal statutes, such as the Controlled Drugs and Substances Act and the Firearms Act, are generally (but not exclusively) conducted by the Public Prosecution Service of Canada. Provincial prosecutors are also responsible for conducting prosecutions under provincial laws, such as securities laws and wildlife laws.

Prosecutors in Canada are public servants, employed by the relevant government. They are not elected. There are similarities between this role and the Crown Prosecution Service in England and Wales and the procurator fiscal in Scotland.

== Jurisdictional issues ==
Although the enactment of criminal law is under federal jurisdiction in Canada, the prosecution of most Criminal Code offences—outside of Yukon, the Northwest Territories, and Nunavut—is the responsibility of the provincial Attorneys General and their lawful deputies by virtue of the "interpretation" section of the Criminal Code. As a result, the vast majority of crown attorneys are employed by Canada's ten provinces.

Lawyers who act on civil or administrative matters for the provincial Crown are not referred to as crown attorneys (Senior General Counsel, general counsel), or simply crown counsel. Both criminal and civil attorneys are generally considered to be agents of their province's Attorney General and reports to their office. Lawyers who work for the Federal Ministry of Justice are often referred to as Crowns even if acting in civil matters. Moreover, lawyers, students-at-law and other persons who only represent the Crown on provincial offences matters (such as municipal by-law enforcement and traffic offences) are referred to as "provincial prosecutors" or "provincial offences attorneys" (POAs) rather than crown attorneys. Regardless of whether the prosecuted matter is a criminal offence or a provincial offence, crown Attorneys represent and argue on behalf of the Crown.

=== Ontario ===
In the province of Ontario, the name of the official is Crown attorney. The Attorney General of Ontario appoints one Crown attorney per judicial district. The Crown attorney is charged with supervising the Crown attorney's office at the local level, and has a level of autonomy from the Attorney General's office. A Crown attorney will then, in consultation with the Attorney General's office, hire assistant crown attorneys to staff the office and prosecute offences.

As crown attorneys are not elected, the Canadian prosecutorial system is often seen as less politically motivated than other systems.

== Term used for the office in different jurisdictions ==
- Federal: Crown counsel
- Alberta: Crown prosecutor
- British Columbia: Crown counsel
- Manitoba: Crown attorney
- New Brunswick: Crown prosecutor
- Newfoundland and Labrador: Crown attorney
- Nova Scotia: Crown attorney
- Ontario: Crown attorney
- Prince Edward Island: Crown attorney
- Quebec: Criminal and penal prosecuting attorney
- Saskatchewan: Crown prosecutor
- Northwest Territories: Crown counsel
- Nunavut: Crown counsel
- Yukon: Crown counsel

== Crown office ==
In Ontario and in some other provinces of Canada, the Crown Attorney Office is the office that is in charge of prosecuting the majority of criminal cases. For the most part, each office is under the jurisdiction of the provincial Attorney General (or the Minister of Justice in Quebec), who is responsible for the conduct of criminal prosecutions at the provincial level.

The offices are generally spread out across each province by municipal districts (county, regional municipality, etc.). Large cities like Toronto have several Crown Attorney Offices. Each office reports to the provincial Attorney General (or Minister of Justice).

In British Columbia, Nova Scotia and Quebec, the "Director of Public Prosecutions" (or Direction générale des poursuites publiques) is responsible for criminal cases. In other provinces, the office is referred to as the "Crown Attorney's Office" or a similar title.

For federal criminal cases, the Public Prosecution Service of Canada is the responsible entity.

== List of offices across Canada ==
- Alberta – Chief Crown Prosecutor – Crown Prosecutor's Office
- British Columbia – Director of Public Prosecution – Office of Public Prosecution
- Manitoba – Chief Crown Attorney – Manitoba Prosecution Service
- New Brunswick – Chief Crown Prosecutor – Crown Prosecutors Office
- Newfoundland and Labrador – Chief Crown Prosecutor – Public Prosecution Office
- Nova Scotia – Chief Crown Attorney – Office of Public Prosecution
- Ontario – Chief Crown Attorney – Crown Attorney's Office
- Prince Edward Island – Chief Crown Attorney – Crown Attorneys' Office
- Quebec – Director of Criminal and Penal Prosecutions – Office of the Director of Criminal and Penal Prosecutions
- Saskatchewan – Chief Crown Prosecution – Public Prosecution Office
- Yukon – Chief Crown Prosecution – Crown Prosecution Office
- Northwest Territories – Chief of Public Prosecution – Office of Public Prosecution
- Nunavut – Director of Public Prosecution – Public Prosecution Service of Canada

== See also ==
- Crown prosecutor
- Crown counsel
- Director of Public Prosecutions
- Public Prosecution Service of Canada
