= Crown Attorney's Office (Ontario) =

Prosecutors in Ontario, Canada

The term Crown Attorney's Office is the title for the various public prosecution offices (16 across Ontario) under the jurisdiction of the province of Ontario. Each Ontario Superior Court of Justice has its own Crown Attorney's Office, which conducts all criminal trial prosecutions and summary conviction appeals for cases that the province is responsible for in that court's geographical area (see Criminal law in Canada). The numerous Crown Attorney Offices, along with the Crown Law Office – Criminal and various specialized offices forms the Criminal Law Division of the Attorney General of Ontario, under the immediate supervision of the Division's Assistant Deputy Attorney General of Ontario (ADAG).

Each court district has a Crown Attorney, one or more Deputy Crown Attorneys and multiple Assistant Crown Attorneys. Crown Attorneys and Assistant Crown Attorneys are appointed by Order in Council for the province and then assigned to a courthouse. Each district Crown Attorney has a degree of autonomy from the Attorney General's office, and most of Ontario's criminal cases are prosecuted by each Office's group of Assistant Crown Attorneys. This arrangement differs from the rest of Canada, and is closer in structure to that of the District Attorney system used in the United States (with the exception of Crown Attorneys being appointed and nonpartisan). In other provinces and the federal Public Prosecution Service of Canada, leadership is more centralised in the Director of Public Prosecutions or equivalent office.

Court districts fall under one of 8 court regions, each of which is overseen by a Director of Crown Operations who reports to the Assistant Deputy Attorney General.

Major cases:

- R v MT & DB (Rengel murder)
- R v DeJesus (Lisa Posluns murder)
- R v Roy (Allison Parrott murder)
- R v McKenzie (OC Transpo murder)
- R v Riley et al. (Pathfinder)
- R v Cameron, McDowell, Parish, and Saleh (Arson murder)
- R v Myers (Ardeth Wood murder)
- R v Davis (Jennifer Teague murder)
- R v Ranger & Kinkead (Ottey murders)
- R v Kimberley and Clancy (Carolyn Warrick murder)
- R v Snow (Blackburn murders)

The Crown Attorney's main office is at McMurtry-Scott Building in Toronto.

In June 2020, the Crown Attorney's Office of Ontario made national news when they petitioned to delay the return to court over fears surrounding the 2020 Coronavirus outbreak.

== See also ==
Similar services in other jurisdictions:

- Canada (provincial): Crown Attorney Office (Canada)
- Canada (federal): Public Prosecution Service of Canada
- Scotland: Crown Office and Procurator Fiscal Service
- Northern Ireland: Public Prosecution Service for Northern Ireland
- England and Wales: Crown Prosecution Service
