= Fire Safety Commission =

Quasi-judicial agency in Ontario, Canada

Fire Safety Commission _{Commission de la sécurité-incendie (French)}
Agency overview
- Type: Tribunal
- Jurisdiction: Province of Ontario
- Headquarters: 25 Grosvenor Street Toronto, Ontario
- Minister responsible: Attorney General of Ontario
- Parent agency: Tribunals Ontario
- Key document: The Fire Protection and Prevention Act
- Website: tribunalsontario.ca/fsc//

The Fire Safety Commission (FSC; French: Commission de la sécurité-incendie) is an independent, quasi-judicial agency in Ontario, Canada. It is one of 13 adjudicative tribunals under the Ministry of the Attorney General that make up Tribunals Ontario.

The FSC resolves disputes, conducts case conferences and hearings regarding fire safety.

== Authority ==
The FSC has three related legislations and regulations: The Fire Protection and Prevention Act, Fire Code and Statutory Powers Procedure Act. The FSC resolves disputes and conducts hearings regarding fire safety matters, including orders made by inspectors or the Fire Marshal for repairs, alterations or installations to a building, structure or premises.
