= Child and Family Services Review Board =

Child and Family Services Review Board _{Commission de révision des services à l'enfance et à la famille (French)}
Agency overview
- Type: Tribunal
- Jurisdiction: Province of Ontario
- Headquarters: 25 Grosvenor Street Toronto, Ontario
- Minister responsible: Attorney General of Ontario
- Parent agency: Tribunals Ontario
- Key document: Child, Youth and Family Services Act
- Website: tribunalsontario.ca/cfsrb/

The Child and Family Services Review Board (CFSRB; French: Commission de révision des services à l'enfance et à la famille) is an independent, quasi-judicial agency in Ontario, Canada. It is one of 13 adjudicative tribunals under the Ministry of the Attorney General that make up Tribunals Ontario. The CFSRB is responsible for reviewing and hearing issues that involve children, youth, and families in Ontario.

== Authority ==
The CFSRB conducts hearings and appeals mandated under the Education Act, Child, Youth and Family Services Act, and Intercountry Adoption Act. Under these three acts, the CFSRB resolves complaints and disputes regarding children’s aid societies, emergency secure treatment, crown ward removal, refusal of adoption, and expulsion from school boards
