= Ontario Civilian Police Commission =

Umbrella organization of adjudicative tribunals in Ontario, Canada

Ontario Civilian Police Commission _{Commission civile de l’Ontario sur la police (French)}
Agency overview
- Type: Tribunal
- Jurisdiction: Province of Ontario
- Headquarters: 25 Grosvenor Street; Toronto, Ontario
- Minister responsible: Doug Downey, Attorney General of Ontario
- Parent agency: Tribunals Ontario
- Key document: Police Services Act
- Website: tribunalsontario.ca/ocpc/

The Ontario Civilian Police Commission (OCPC; French: Commission civile de l’Ontario sur la police), previously known as the Ontario Police Commission and the Ontario Civilian Commission on Police Services, was an independent quasi-judicial agency. It was one of the 13 adjudicative tribunals overseen by the Ministry of the Attorney General that make up Tribunals Ontario. The OCPC heard appeals, adjudicated applications, conducted investigations and resolved disputes regarding the oversight and provision of policing services in Ontario.

The role and authority of OCPC was mandated under the Ontario Police Services Act.

On April 1, 2024, the Community Safety and Policing Act, 2019 (CSPA) came into force and the Police Services Act was repealed. As of September 2025, the OCPC was no longer operating.

== Structure ==
The OCPC has two divisions: Adjudicative and Investigative. The divisions operate independently under one Registrar.

The Adjudicative division is led by the Associate Chair and, until the Police Services Act was repealed, primarily dealt with appeals of disciplinary matters, proposals to amalgamate, reduce or abolish existing municipal police forces, budgetary disputes regarding police services, and other functions.

The Investigative division is led by the Executive Chair and dealt with investigations, inquiries and public complaints concerning the conduct of chiefs of police, police officers, special constables and police services boards.

== Responsibilities ==
The OCPC hears appeals, adjudicated applications, conducts investigations, and resolves disputes regarding the oversight and provision of policing services. The Special Investigations Unit primarily investigates police-involved incidents of death, serious injury, and sexual assault.

Requests for other types of services can also be made by the Ontario provincial government.
