= Fairness Is a Two-Way Street Act =

Ontario, Canada statute

The Fairness is a Two-Way Street Act (Construction Labour Mobility) is a statute in Ontario, Canada, that was passed in 1999 and repealed in 2006. Quebec laws effectively made it nearly impossible for Ontario-owned construction companies and Ontario-credentialed tradespeople to work in Quebec. The Act retaliated by placing similar restrictions on Quebec-trained tradespeople and Quebec-based companies seeking work in Ontario.

== Background ==
Both sides of the Ontario-Quebec border are highly populated with major population centres on both sides - Ottawa, Cornwall, and North Bay on the Ontario side, and Montreal, Hull, and Temiscaming on the Quebec side. There are also several bridge links across the Ottawa River that link communities on both sides. As a result, it is common for persons to live in one province and work in the other. For example, many federal government workers in Ottawa live in Hull to take advantage of lower child care fees or French-language schools.

However, by the 1990s, the labour market in the construction industry in Quebec was highly regulated and unionized. In addition, the province of Quebec favoured Quebec-based contractors when awarding large infrastructure projects. For example, Hydro-Québec essentially restricted the awarding of contracts to Quebec owned firms. Skilled tradespersons from Ontario found it nearly impossible to work in Quebec, as the provincial government supported Quebec's labour unions, which enforced closed shop regulations and strict limits on what trades could perform such work. Ontario workers found it impossible to join Quebec locals, even in the same union.

Moreover, Quebec's labour ministry often refused to recognize the qualifications of skilled Ontario trade persons which did not exactly match those of Quebec's defined trades. Ontario, which had a largely non-union labour force, had no such restrictions, and the Ontario government bid jobs freely to all comers. As a result, by 1998, there were seven times as many Quebec residents working in the construction trades in Ontario than there were Ontario residents working in those trades in Quebec.

From Quebec's perspective, the restrictions were justified. Most union members felt that Ontario firms were only competitive because they paid their workers lower wages. They also believed that Ontario firms often ignored Quebec's strong occupational health and safety laws. However, when construction jobs were not available in Quebec, many unionized labourers sought non-union jobs in eastern Ontario.

== Passage of the legislation ==
Although the Ontario and Quebec governments reached an agreement in 1996 to allow more labour mobility, by 1998 it was clear that the situation had not improved - unemployment in Ontario's construction industry was higher than that in the province as a whole. The Progressive Conservative Mike Harris government passed the Fairness is a Two-Way Street Act in 1999 which had the following restrictions:

- No Ontario government contract could be awarded to a firm that was based in a "restricted" province, although the only such province defined in the regulations passed under the Act was Quebec. This applied not only to the provincial government, but to municipal governments, school boards, and government enterprises such as Hydro One. The law also applied to subcontractors of the bidder. Quebec companies could not bid on any non-government work in the province without being registered with the Jobs Protection Office.
- No worker from a restricted province could obtain employment in any of the construction trades in Ontario without registering with the Jobs Protection Office and obtaining a permit.

Although the legislation was passed in 1999, this was largely an attempt to force Quebec back to the bargaining table. However, the situation continued to worsen and the Act came into effect in 2002.

== Effects ==
The Act had a limited effect on construction mobility, although the situation did not grow any worse. Many Quebec companies that hired large numbers of Ontario workers (such as SNC-Lavalin) were unintentionally restricted from bidding for contracts and had to be exempted from the effect of the Act. In addition, most Quebec companies of sufficient size set up an Ontario company in order to comply with the new law, which put most of the burden on smaller companies that could not afford to have a dual presence in both provinces.

== Resolution ==
In 2006, Ontario Premier Dalton McGuinty and Quebec Premier Jean Charest came to an agreement to remove the restrictions on Ontario workers. Chief among these was an agreement to allow Ontario firms to bid on jobs for Hydro-Québec in the Outaouais region, which has some of the largest spending on infrastructure in the province.
