= Legal Aid Manitoba =

Canadian legal aid program

- Formation: Founded in 1972
- Founder: Law Society of Manitoba
- Founded at: Winnipeg
- Purpose: Community legal aid
- Headquarters: Winnipeg, Manitoba
- Location: Winnipeg, Brandon, Dauphin, The Pas, Thompson, MB, Canada
- Official language: English, French
- Chair of Management Council: Allan Fineblit, K.C.
- Vice-chair of Management Council: Helga Van Iderstine, K.C.
- Key people: Roberta Campbell, K.C., Daljit Kainth, Dean Scaletta, Greg Johnson, Crystal Laborero, Dr. Shiu-Yik Au
- Budget: $40 m CAD (2025)
- Website: https://www.legalaid.mb.ca/

Legal Aid Manitoba (LAM; French: Aide Juridique Manitoba) is a legal aid company operating across all of Manitoba, focusing on ensuring Manitobans have access to legal services. Working with both men and women, typically aged 26 to 35, LAM focuses on serving the province properly.

Originally founded by the Law Society of Manitoba in the mid- to late 1930s and early 1940s, Legal Aid Manitoba became one of Canada's first legal clinics to provide legal help to those who could not traditionally afford it or to people in adverse circumstances. By 1971, the organization had become an independent entity from the Law Society. The following year, they opened their services to the public in Manitoba. The main goal of LAM is to ensure that those Manitobans who are facing social disadvantages, women who are escaping adverse situations such as abuse, as well as newly arrived Canadians and immigrants, are able to get the legal help they need. To ensure that the people of Manitoba are properly protected, Legal Aid Manitoba works across many fields and travels all over the province to reach isolated communities. This includes areas such as criminal, family, civil and public sectors. The group is centered on easing the burden on the relatively new Manitoba courts. The group helps reduce wait times across all areas of the Manitoba legal system.

With help from donors and other supporters, Legal Aid Manitoba has not only been serving the community in Manitoba but also helping young aspiring law students by offering articling positions. Working as part of the Canadian Centre for Professional Legal Education Program enables the training of the next generation of lawyers in Manitoba while aligning with Legal Aid Manitoba's goals and focus.

== History ==
=== Early history ===
Legal Aid Manitoba began with the establishment of Manitoba's judicial court system in 1872. The Court of King's Bench of Manitoba was created to maintain order in the newly emerging province. The court system in Manitoba, at its official founding, focused primarily on Civil legal proceedings and property issues. As history progressed, a more complete legal system emerged in Manitoba. In 1906, Manitoba's Court of Appeals was created to properly hear appeals from lower-level courts within the province.

In the late 1930s, the province needed greater equal access to legal aid and legal advice. In 1937, the Law Society of Manitoba began undertaking small projects, mainly pro bono, to help the people of the province and ease the pressure on the somewhat newly formed legal system. The society accepted applications from poor Manitobans who could not afford the necessary legal representation. The group began to gain traction and make significant changes within the province's legal network, primarily in civil cases. The group started mostly with volunteer lawyers, was often called the "Poor Man's Lawyer Centre", and served as the foundation for more free legal aid for Manitobans. Eventually, the group developed a Criminal sector within the legal aid area of already-established pro bono work. The criminal and civil areas eventually merged, becoming an area for Manitoba Bar members to join to practice and fulfill pro bono work. Manitoba became a trailblazer in creating these two free aid programs in Canada. Other provinces started to follow suit after 1949. Quebec in 1951, followed suit and created a legal assistance program that focused on allowing young Quebec lawyers. This sparked a "revolution" within the country and a movement to relieve the constant pressure on the Canadian legal system.

==== 1970s and 1980s ====
After the 1950s, a new government was elected to lead the province, the New Democratic Party. The New Democratic Party brought new ideas to the province, including the opening of Legal Aid in 1971. In 1975, the organization shifted to a mix of volunteer workers and paid lawyers. This meant that Legal Aid could work not only with low-income clients but also handle contract work. By 1977, the need for the new Legal Aid had grown. Multiple offices had opened across the province, and nearly half of the practicing lawyers had agreed to work with the organization. This marked a drastic change in the province's legal landscape, now allowing a large population to access legal counsel.

Up until 1982, the province operated under the old legal system. However, after the establishment of the Canadian Charter for Rights and Freedoms, the legal system changed. This affected which cases the organization were now allowed to handle. The Public Interest Law Centre was also created to take cases that could not be taken by Legal Aid, such as poverty law and human rights cases. By the 1990s, Legal Aid had become a successful organization that had made legal counsel available to hundreds of Manitobans.

==== Current day ====
Today, Legal Aid Manitoba is one of the most affordable legal aid programs in Canada. Having a progressive and adjustable payment plan that allows those in difficult, and sometimes extremely difficult, financial situations to pay back legal fees. The group offers some of the most affordable fees in the country, with fees close to three thousand below the national median.

== Financial eligibility ==
Because the goal of Legal Aid is to assist those in the province who cannot afford their own private counsel, there are financial eligibility requirements that must be met to qualify. Those in a certain bracket are eligible for a specific level of compensation and legal aid. The level of compensation is determined by a couple of factors set out by a council, not by the Manitoba Legal Aid Act. The first thing that determines whether a person/ family must have some ability to pay is whether they receive assistance from provincial programs. These programs indicate that the individual is unable to repay their legal costs. The second factor is whether the individual has a place of residence. This helps determine their income level. If the individual has some level of residence, the Legal Aid committee may require a contribution to cover the legal costs of their case. Applicants are assessed for their compensation level through disclosure of their financial records and other significant financial information. In addition to the disclosure of documents to properly establish a person's standing for legal aid, there are other guidelines that must be met. The chart below outlines the guidelines set by the province's Legal Aid Board. These guidelines were accepted and implemented on August 1, 2000.

Income guidelines
Family size	Gross income		
Family size	Fully eligible	Eligible - partial contribution	Eligible - full contribution
1	$14,000	$16,000	$23,000
2	$18,000	$20,000	$27,000
3	$23,000	$25,000	$31,000
4	$27,000	$29,000	$34,000
5	$31,000	$33,000	$37,000
6	$34,000	$36,000	$40,000
7+	$37,000	$39,000	$43,000

Families are often defined by their size in determining the amount of possible aid, as shown above. There is some space between each step in terms of ability to make payments. If a family's income exceeds that outlined in the normal guidelines on their applications, partial contributions may still be available. This goes for every step of the ladder, if a family applies for legal aid and makes more than their bracket but does not exceed the next possible bracket, the family has the ability to still receive representation. The only exception to this rule is if the applying family makes more than the normal eligibility standard.

== Public Interest Law Centre ==
=== History ===
The Public Interest Law Centre (PLIC) is a separate channel for legal help in Manitoba. They work alongside those at Legal Aid Manitoba to provide aid to anyone, regardless of legal standing, often operating on a pro bono basis. The group focuses mainly on cases that are often underrepresented or not represented at all within the legal system; groups such as Indigenous groups, environmental issues and those in unfortunate financial circumstances. In a similar fashion to Legal Aid Manitoba, the PLIC works just outside the reach of the government and receives funding and support from various groups like the Manitoba Law Foundation, and through awards and grants. Because of the focus of making legal aid equal and accessible to all, the group offer legal aid in both of Canada's official languages. Additionally, the group has some employees who are able to speak other languages. The work that has been by the PILC has been so successful that, it has become an awarded area of legal aid in the province. It has won numerous awards including recognition award for their work in help people with disabilities. This award was given to the PILC by the Manitoba Human Rights Commission.

=== Cases ===
Because of the nature of Legal Aid's work, they do not work solely in one area. Some of the cases that are currently being pursued by the PILC include cases around fighting to help keep the cost of hydro for low income Manitobans affordable. PILC is working with adults in the province who have physical disabilities gain access to proper services and programs as there is a shortage in the province. Working with same sex and gender diverse families who are facing issues within Manitoba school systems. Working with Indigenous communities to make sure that those who are living with disabilities on reserves have the proper resources and accommodations on the reserve. In addition to the current pursuits, the PILC has had success in multiple fields of community aid.

==== Consumer law cases ====
The PILC in Manitoba was a part of a couple key cases that involved the Public Utilities Board (PUB). The first was a case that PILC was a part of was in a group with some other members of the Manitoba community focused on giving back, groups like Winnipeg Harvest and the Manitoba branch of the Consumer's Association of Canada. In this case the group believed that the current system that existed for Manitobans regarding payday loans was causing a cycle that instead of helping people was making it harder for them to get out of debt. The PILC team was able to work with the Manitoba government to have PUB set the standard for the loans rather than aligning it with the rest of Canada. This agreement made Manitoba the best province in regards to payday loans in Canada. The other cases that PILC was a part of that helped in setting a standard for government cheque cashers. Before 2007 in Manitoba, those who relied on government cheques and did not have any bank accounts paid a fee that was much higher than that of a normal Manitoban. With the help of PILC, the Manitoba government after 2007, set rates for those who relied on cashing government cheques now had to pay a certain fee depending on a certain criteria rather than relying on larger industry standings.

==== Environmental law cases ====
Environmental law in Manitoba has been very present in terms of importance to the province. Manitoba is a part of the Eastern edge of the Canadian Shield which is home to many species of wild life. In addition to the Canadian Shield, the Prairie provinces have a variety of wild life that are unique to the area. Thus PILC is focused on the preservation of these animals and species. One of the main cases that PILC was a part of was the protection of the Omand's Creek wildlife preserve in 1980. Working alongside the provinces naturalist society, PLIC helped in preventing the construction of housing in the area. This construction would have caused the wildlife to become displaced and also would have destroyed the natural flow of the surrounding waterways. The work of PILC allowed for the creation of a wildlife protection park by the province.

==== Disability rights cases ====
Numerous groups in Manitoba have been pushing to make the province more accessible for everyone. Numerous cases have taken place in the province with many of them involving the PILC. The first case that involved Legal Aid and the PILC group was a case in 2012 were people with disabilities were looking to have a disability friendly limousine service established. The claim by the Taxicab board of Winnipeg was that there was enough service that allowed for the transportation of peoples with disabilities in the city. The denial was overturned by PILC and a couple of years after 2012, and now people in Winnipeg have access to disability friendly limousine services.

Another case that involved the PILC was in the development of removing barriers for those with disabilities in the work sphere. In Manitoba before 2008, there was no formal board that would help in the removal of barriers for those with disabilities in the work environment. In 2008, Barrier-Free Manitoba was formed. After five years of campaigning for the development of an accessibility plan for equal access. The campaign proved to be successful because the Manitoba government passed the Accessibility for Manitobans Act (AMA), making it just the second provincial government to aid in the removal of workplace barriers.
