= Municipal Property Assessment Corporation =

Ontario government agency

MPAC (Municipal Property Assessment Corporation )
- Formerly: OPAC (Ontario Property Assessment Corporation)
- Company type: Crown corporation
- Industry: Real estate accurately assess and classify all properties in Ontario an independent, not-for-profit corporation funded by all Ontario municipalities.
- Founded: December 31, 1998
- Founder: Government of Ontario
- Headquarters: Pickering, Ontario, Canada
- Number of locations: 35
- Area served: Ontario
- Key people: Nicole McNeill (President and Chief Administrative Officer)
- Owner: Government of Ontario
- Number of employees: 1700
- Parent: Government of Ontario
- Website: www.mpac.ca

The Municipal Property Assessment Corporation (MPAC) administers property assessments and appeals of assessment in the province of Ontario, Canada. MPAC determines the assessed value for all properties across Ontario. This is provided in the form of an Assessment Roll, which is delivered to municipalities throughout the province on the second Tuesday in December. Municipalities then take the assessment roll, and calculate property taxes for each individual property in their jurisdiction.

The head office is located in Pickering, Ontario. MPAC, formerly known as OPAC (Ontario Property Assessment Corporation), was created on December 31, 1997, as a method to create accurate and equitable assessments across Ontario. MPAC came into existence with the MPAC Act, and it administers the Assessment Act, both part of Ontario provincial legislation. On December 31, 1998, the Government of Ontario transferred responsibility for property assessment from the Ministry of Finance to the Ontario Property Assessment Corporation, an independent body established by the Ontario Property Assessment Corporation Act, 1997.

Prior to the creation of MPAC, municipalities in Ontario had discretion on how they chose to assess properties. This created inequity across the province, as similar properties across the province had separate values.

In 2022, MPAC sent out approximately 6 million property assessment notices, advising properties of their assessment value. The current values are based on a January 1, 2016 valuation date. Due to the COVID-19 pandemic, the Ontario government postponed the 2020 Assessment Update. They indicated that property assessments for the 2022 and 2023 property tax years will continue to be based on the fully phased-on January 1, 2016, current values. In August 2023, the Ontario government announced that it was postponing a provincewide property reassessment as it conducts a new review of the accuracy and fairness of the system. In 2022 alone, MPAC added more than $37.8 billion to municipal rolls across Ontario through its assessments of new construction and renovated properties. Municipalities pay more than $200 million annually for this service.

== MPAC history ==
=== Pre-1970 ===
Although property assessment originally came under the jurisdiction of Upper Canada, it was transferred to Ontario municipalities in 1849. Over time, each municipality developed its own assessment system and methods of valuing property. This resulted in inconsistencies in property assessment and the distribution of property taxes. Within a municipality, properties with a similar appearance and value could have very different assessments. There were also very different assessments from municipality to municipality.

In 1963, the Provincial Government appointed the Ontario Committee on Taxation to study taxation and recommend changes. Its report, published in 1967, highlighted many inequities in the assessment system.

=== 1970-1997 – Market value assessment introduced ===
In response to The Ontario Committee on Taxation Report, the Provincial Government assumed responsibility for property assessment in 1970 to create a uniform assessment system for all Ontario municipalities. The Government introduced market value assessment and the new system was offered to municipal governments on a voluntary basis.

Since the new system was voluntary, not all municipalities implemented market value assessment. As a result, property assessments differed from municipality to municipality. This situation was addressed by the Province with the introduction of the Fair Municipal Finance Act, 1997. With this Act substantial amendments to the Assessment Act, the Municipal Act and other related legislation were implemented, setting the stage for reshaping Ontario's assessment and property tax system in 1998.

=== Post-1997 – Ontario Fair Assessment System ===
Under the "Ontario Fair Assessment System", property assessments across the province were updated to their current value, using a common valuation date.

In addition, on December 31, 1998, responsibility for property assessment was transferred by the government of the Hon. Mr. Mike Harris to a new, not-for-profit corporation called the Ontario Property Assessment Corporation, later renamed the Municipal Property Assessment Corporation (MPAC). Every municipality in Ontario is a member of MPAC, which is governed by a board of directors composed of taxpayer, municipal, and provincial representatives.

=== Controversy ===
Persons living in areas where other houses increase in value, such as by replacement with newer and larger houses, often blame MPAC for increases in their taxes. MPAC disclaims responsibility, arguing that the property owners should blame the municipality. The municipalities, in turn, blame MPAC and its organizing legislation. The debate is ongoing.

==== Toronto Star Investigation ====
In 2023, a Toronto Star investigation into the accuracy and fairness of property assessments found that MPAC systemically under-assessed more expensive homes and over-assessed less expensive homes, which causes a disproportionate tax burden on lower and middle-income homeowners.

== See also ==
- Crown corporations of Canada
