= William Firth =

Canadian politician

The Hon. William Firth (21 July 1768 – 25 February 1838) was a Canadian lawyer, judge and political figure in Upper Canada.

Son of merchant William Firth and his wife Elizabeth, Firth studied law and became a barrister. He married Anne Watts, and they had five children. Firth wrote four political pamphlets between 1794 and 1825, all published in Norwich. In 1803, he was appointed steward of Norwich, where he acted as city counsel and presided over the sheriff's court. He resigned soon after being commissioned as attorney general of Upper Canada through the influence of William Windham, colonial secretary on the 19 March 1807.

Firth arrived at York, Upper Canada (Toronto) in time to take up his duties as attorney general in November 1807. His office had been vacant for over a year, since the appointment in January 1806 of his predecessor, Thomas Scott, as chief justice of the province. D'Arcy Boulton, the solicitor general, performed the duties of the attorney general in the interim. In April 1808, Firth asked for a transfer to Lower Canada as chief justice, but his application failed.

In 1809, Firth began to ask for more money from Lieutenant Governor Francis Gore's administration, as his stipend was £300 sterling a year – about half the cost of his removal to Upper Canada. By 1811, Firth's attempts to increase his fees had made him nearly friendless in the provincial administration. In March 1811, Firth claimed that all legal instruments under the great seal of the province were invalid without his signature.

Firth's accounts for unauthorized court attendances were disallowed by the Board of Audit. He applied for a leave of absence to argue his case in London, was refused permission by Gore. He departed for England regardless in September 1811, and the Lieutenant-Governor suspended him, and informed Lord Liverpool, in a letter dated September 30, 1811, that "too much care cannot be exercised in choosing a successor to Mr. Firth." Gore recommended his dismissal. Lord Bathurst decided that Firth was entitled to half his salary and fees from the date he left the province until 13 April 1812, when his removal from office was confirmed. Firth returned to his legal practice. In 1817, he was promoted to "serjeant at law", and he ended his career where it had begun, on the Norfolk circuit.

In 1820, Firth applied for a land grant in Upper Canada, but was refused on the grounds that he was not a resident. He died intestate on February 25, 1838; succumbing to influenza in Norwich.
