= Independent Visitor =

The role of Independent Visitor was created in the United Kingdom under the 1989 Children Act to befriend children and young people in care. Independent Visitors are adult volunteers who give up some of their free time to take a special interest in a child or young adult, especially those placed in a residential setting who would benefit from a more individualised relationship.

The Act makes it a legal requirement that children and young people who are looked after by Social Services, and who have little or no contact with their birth parents, should be offered the chance to have an adult in their lives who can give them support and advice, and take an interest in their affairs. The 2008 Children and Young Peoples Act states more specifically that all young people in care have a right to an Independent Visitor. The appointment of an independent visitor takes place when it is in the child’s interests to do so and must be determined according to the child's needs. Under Section 3:262, an independent visitor must not be an elected member or an officer of the responsible authority.

== The Purpose of the Independent Visitor ==
Under Section 3.266, the Independent Visitor's role is to contribute to the welfare of the child and promote the child’s developmental, social, emotional, educational, religious and cultural needs. A visitor may encourage the child to exercise their rights and to take part in decisions that will affect them. As far as possible, the Independent Visitor aims to complement the activities of carers and support the child's care plan.

Under Section 3.267-8, the Independent Visitor visits, advises and befriends the child according to their needs and wishes. The Independent Visitor is expected to be child-focused, but is not a substitute for either a parent or a carer.

== Selecting an Independent Visitor ==
Under Section 3.273, the local authority must take into account the wishes and feelings of the child when matching them to an Independent Visitor, and is, therefore, part of this process.

Social Workers and carers play a very important role in the lives of children and young people in care, but a relationship with an adult who is independent from the local authority can make an additional and positive contribution to promoting the child’s education and health.
