= William Draper (cricketer) =

English cricketer

Personal information
- Full name: William Draper
- Born: 12 November 1848; Penshurst, Kent
- Died: 13 March 1919 (aged 70); Tunbridge Wells, Kent
- Batting: Left-handed
- Bowling: Right-arm medium
- Relatives: Henry Draper (brother)

Domestic team information
- Years: Team
- 1874–1880: Kent
- First-class debut: 13 July 1874 Kent v Derbyshire
- Last First-class: 19 August 1880 Kent v Lancashire

Career statistics
Competition	First-class
Matches	9
Runs scored	108
Batting average	7.20
100s/50s	0/0
Top score	28
Balls bowled	769
Wickets	20
Bowling average	14.50
5 wickets in innings	1
10 wickets in match	0
Best bowling	5/51
Catches/stumpings	3/–
- Source: CricInfo, 30 May 2017

William Draper (12 November 1848 – 13 March 1919) was an English cricketer who played first-class cricket for Kent County Cricket Club from 1874 to 1880.

Draper was born at Penshurst in Kent in 1848. His name was registered at birth as William Drapper. In 1872 he appeared for a Colts of England cricket team and in 1873 represented a team comprising players engaged at Prince's Club.

In 1874 Draper made his first-class debut for Kent playing in their first county match against Derbyshire. He played nine first-class matches in total for the county as a left-handed batsman who bowled right-arm medium pace deliveries. Draper was a first-class umpire between 1887 and 1898. He died at Tunbridge Wells in Kent in 1919 aged 70.

== Bibliography ==
- Carlaw, Derek (2020). Kent County Cricketers, A to Z: Part One (1806–1914) (PDF). Cardiff: ACS.
