= Landlord and Tenant Board =

Adjudicative tribunal in Ontario, Canada

Landlord and Tenant Board _{Commission de la location immobilière (French)}
Agency overview
- Formed: January 31, 2007
- Preceding agency: Ontario Rental Housing Tribunal
- Type: Tribunal
- Jurisdiction: Province of Ontario
- Headquarters: 25 Grosvenor Street Toronto, Ontario
- Minister responsible: Attorney General of Ontario
- Parent agency: Tribunals Ontario
- Key document: Residential Tenancies Act, 2006
- Website: tribunalsontario.ca/ltb/

The Landlord and Tenant Board (French: Commission de la location immobilière) is an adjudicative tribunal operating in the province of Ontario that provides dispute resolution of landlord and tenant matters under the Residential Tenancies Act, 2006. It is one of the 13 adjudicative tribunals overseen by the Ministry of the Attorney General that make up Tribunals Ontario.

== Process ==
Either landlords or tenants may file an application to the board. The parties can choose to first attempt to resolve the matter through mediation. If the mediation is unsuccessful or if the parties choose not to attempt mediation, then an adjudication hearing is held in which a board member hears evidence from both parties before issuing an order. The Statutory Powers Procedure Act provides a general framework for the conduct of hearings before Ontario's administrative tribunals including the LTB.

A landlord may apply to the board to increase a unit's rent above the province's rent control guidelines or to evict a tenant. Tenants can dispute evictions, apply for rent reductions or rebates due to a landlord's failure to meet maintenance obligations, apply for work orders or other orders, or grieve other violations of the Residential Tenancies Act. In Ontario, a landlord cannot evict a tenant without a hearing before the board.

== Legal representation ==
In Ontario, a person may be represented by an individual licensed by the Law Society of Ontario such as a lawyer or a paralegal. There are other exemptions for unpaid representatives such as direct employees of the landlord or in the case of a tenant a friend or family member. It is the obligation of the individual claiming the representation exemption to provide proof to the board of their legal authorization to represent a person or company in front of the board. Prior to a board hearing tenants are offered the opportunity to speak to tenant duty counsel which is usually provided by a community legal aid clinic funded through Legal Aid Ontario.

== Jurisdiction ==
According to the Residential Tenancies Act, 2006 (RTA), the LTB has the jurisdiction to resolve all matters between landlords and tenants, to mediate or adjudicate eviction applications from non-profit housing co-operatives, and provide information to landlords, tenants about their rights and responsibilities under the RTA as well as information about LTB’s practices and procedure.

Under the RTA, a tenant must be in possession of a rental unit prior to filing an application with the board.

If a landlord would like to make a claim against a tenant after a tenant has vacated the rental unit, the landlord must file an L10 with the LTB.

== Legal decisions ==
Some LTB decisions are published by CanLII. As of 2021, there were 19,621 decisions posted to CanLII.

The LTB processes around 80,000 applications per year. A majority of those applications are non-payment of rent applications.

=== Publication of LTB decisions ===
Access to Adjudicative Records at the Landlord and Tenant Board is governed by the Tribunal Adjudicative Records Act, 2019, S.O. 2019, c. 7, Sched. 60, and the Freedom of Information and Protection of Privacy Act, R.S.O. 1990, c. F.31.

According to Toronto Star v. AG Ontario, 2018 ONSC 2586 (CanLII) decisions of the Landlord and Tenant Board are not subject to the privacy considerations as personal information under the Freedom of Information and Protection of Privacy Act, R.S.O. 1990, c. F.31.

== See also ==
- Rent control in Ontario
- Public housing in Canada
