= Financial Services Commission =

Financial Services Commission or FSC may refer to:

- Financial Services Commission of Mauritius
- British Virgin Islands Financial Services Commission
- Financial Services Commission of Ontario
- Financial Services Commission (South Korea)
- Guernsey Financial Services Commission
- Anguilla Financial Services Commission
- Florida Financial Services Commission
