= Residential Tenancies Act (Alberta) =

Canadian provincial legislation

The Residential Tenancies Act (RTA) is the law that governs rental housing agreements (leases) in the Canadian province of Alberta.

The Residential Tenancies Act outlines two possible types of rental agreement: Fixed Term and Periodic.

Fixed Term rental agreements are strict binding contacts that outline the terms of property rental for a set period of time - usually one year. These leases cannot be terminated until the end of the specified rental period, or unless there is a breach of the lease agreement or certain provisions of the Act itself, as laid out in the "Tenant's Remedies" and "Landlord's Remedies" sections of the act.

Periodic rental agreements are open-ended and can be terminated (no-fault) by giving the required amount of notice.
