= Residential Tenancies Act, 2006 =

Ontario, Canada statute

Legislative Assembly of Ontario
- Citation: S.O. 2006, c. 17

This is the Residential Tenancies Act of Ontario. For other jurisdictions, see Residential Tenancies Act (disambiguation).

The Residential Tenancies Act, 2006 (French: Loi de 2006 sur la location à usage d'habitation, RTA 2006) is the law in the province of Ontario, Canada, that governs landlord and tenant relations in residential rental accommodations. The Act received royal assent on June 22, 2006, and was proclaimed into law on January 31, 2007. The Act repealed and replaced the Tenant Protection Act, 1997. Ontario's Landlord and Tenant Board (LTB) is governed by the act.

== Contents ==
The Residential Tenancies Act 2006 contains chapters on the meaning of a tenancy, the duties of landlords and tenants, "security of tenure" and the list of legitimate reasons that a landlord can evict a tenant, and a system of rent regulation.

Section 120 contains the key provision on rent regulation, which says that rents cannot increase by more than 2.5 per cent in a year.

Guideline increase

120. (1) No landlord may increase the rent charged to a tenant, or to an assignee under section 95, during the term of their tenancy by more than the guideline, except in accordance with section 126 or 127 or an agreement under section 121 or 123. 2006, c. 17, s. 120 (1).

Guideline (2) The Minister shall determine the guideline in effect for each calendar year as follows:

1. Subject to the limitation set out in paragraph 2, the guideline for a calendar year is the percentage change from year to year in the Consumer Price Index for Ontario for prices of goods and services as reported monthly by Statistics Canada, averaged over the 12-month period that ends at the end of May of the previous calendar year, rounded to the first decimal point.
2. The guideline for a calendar year shall be not more than 2.5 per cent. 2012, c. 6, s. 1.

Section 38 states a lease will automatically renew indefinitely. Section 39 requires an LTB order to remove a tenant who does not leave voluntarily. Together these sections effectively give tenants, if they pay their rent and do not violate other rules, lifetime tenancy.
