= Attorney General (Ontario) =

Attorney general for the Canadian province of Ontario

Attorney General of Ontario
- French: Procureur général de l'Ontario
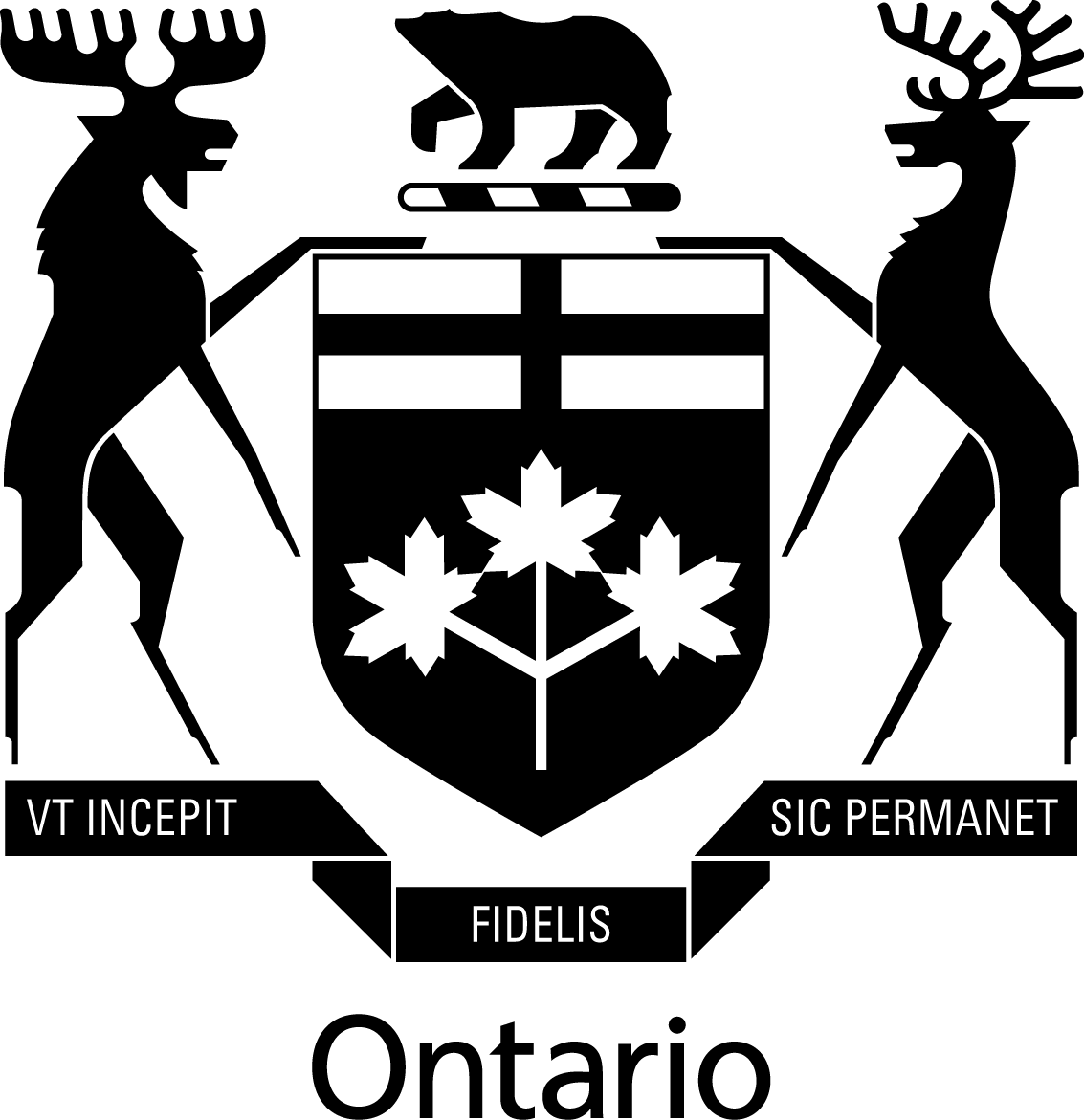

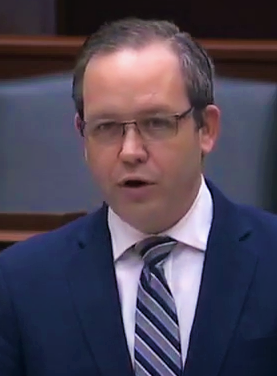
- Incumbent; Doug Downey since June 20, 2019
- Executive Council of Ontario
- Style: The Honourable
- Term length: At His Majesty’s Pleasure
- Inaugural holder: John Sandfield Macdonald as Attorney General of Ontario
- Website: Office of the Attorney General

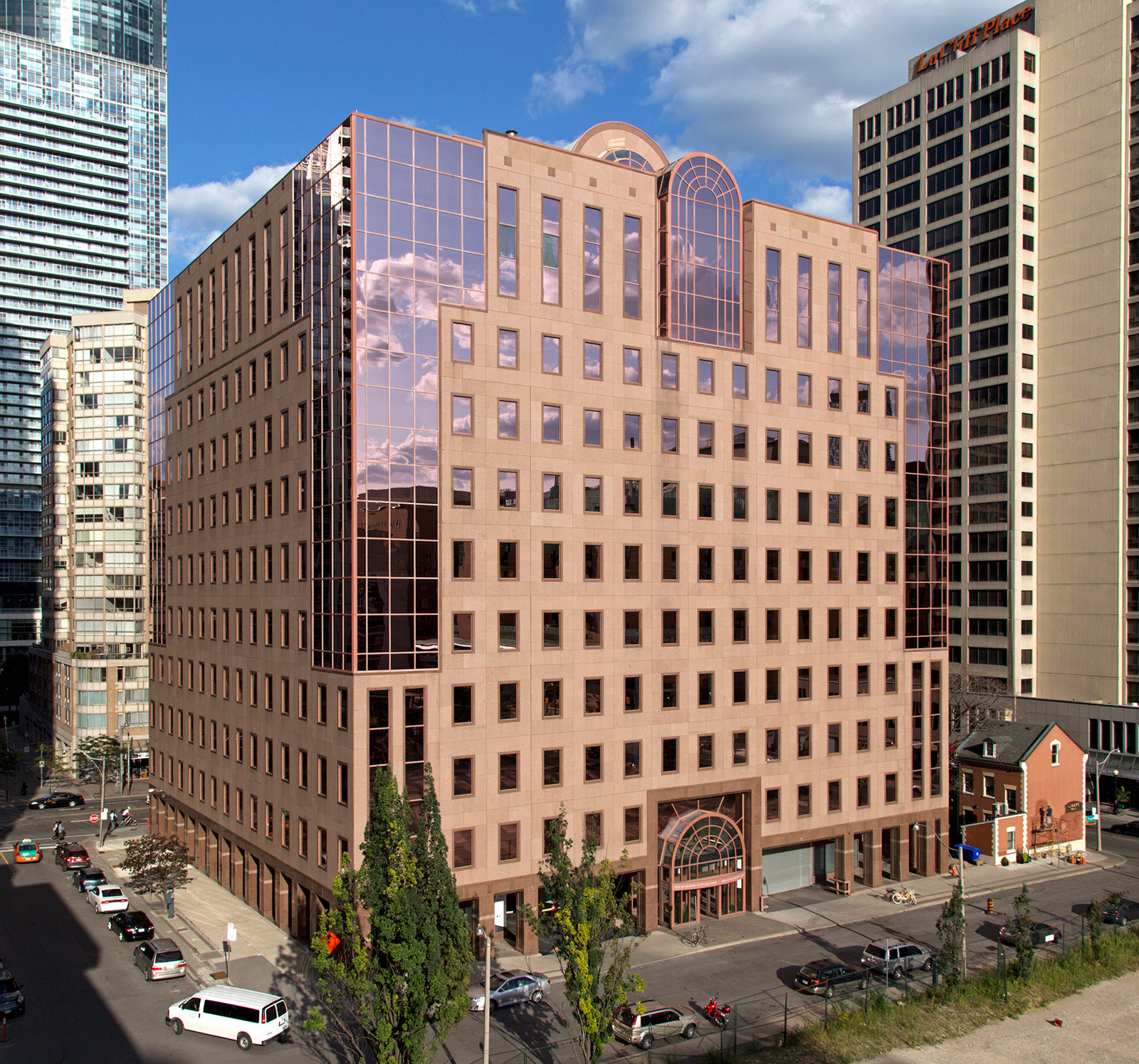
The Attorney General of Ontario's main office (McMurtry-Scott Building) in downtown Toronto

The Attorney General of Ontario is a cabinet level official in the provincial government of Ontario, Canada. Like attorneys general in many other jurisdictions, the Attorney General of Ontario functions simultaneously as the departmental minister accountable for the department charged with legal services and administration of law, and as the chief legal adviser to the cabinet (acting formally in the name of the Crown in Right of Ontario) and, by extension, the Government of Ontario.

The office of the Attorney General of Ontario is one of the five original provincial executive offices explicitly prescribed by the British North America Act, 1867 upon the province's founding, and is the only office of the five still operating under the same name. As a portfolio minister, the Attorney General heads the Ministry of the Attorney General (commonly referred to as MAG within the government), the ministry responsible for providing legal services to the rest of the government and for operating Ontario's court system and a long list of quasi-judicial tribunals and agencies.

Like all other members of the Ontario provincial cabinet, the Attorney General is an elected Members of Provincial Parliament nominated by the Premier of Ontario and formally appointed by the Lieutenant Governor of Ontario. While not required by law to do so, Ontario Premiers had almost always selected such nominees from among members of the government caucus who were lawyers. In the province's century and a half history, only one attorney general, Marion Boyd (held the portfolio 1993–95) was not a lawyer, and only one , William Raney (held the portfolio 1919–23) was recruited from another party and outside the legislature when appointed. Coincidentally, they were each attorney general of the only two ministries not formed by the two main parties.

Doug Downey is the incumbent Attorney General of Ontario. First elected to the legislature in 2018 as MPP for the electoral district of Barrie—Springwater—Oro-Medonte, is the second Attorney General of the Ford ministry currently in office, and had held the portfolio since 20 June 2019.

== Responsibilities ==
The Ministry of the Attorney General delivers and administers a wide range of justice services, including:

1. administering approximately 115 statutes;
2. conducting vast majority of the criminal prosecution in Ontario;
3. providing legal advice to, and conducting litigation on behalf of, all government ministries and many agencies, boards and tribunals;
4. providing advice on, and drafting, all legislation and regulations; and
5. coordinating and administering court services throughout Ontario.

The Ontario Crown Attorney's Office, the Office of the Public Guardian and Trustee, the Office of the Children's Lawyer (formerly called the Official Guardian), and the Special Investigations Unit (SIU) all fall within the Ministry's responsibilities. The Ministry also partially funds Legal Aid Ontario, which is administered by an independent board and also receives funding through the Law Foundation of Ontario and from the federal government.

=== Personal representation of the Crown ===
Although the attorney general may represent the provincial government in court personally, such occurrences are extremely rare. While all but one occupant of the office were lawyers, few of them carried focused litigation practice prior to being attorney general, even fewer still focused in constitutional litigation, a highly specialized area of practice. With few exceptions, the government is represented by professional litigators employed in one of the many branches specialized in specific area of law, such as the Crown Law Office and the Constitutional Law Branch. Former Attorneys General had only on very rare occasions appeared in person to argue the government's position. Progressive Conservative Roy McMurtry and Liberal Ian Scott, the two Attorneys General presiding over the ministry during the Patriation of the Canadian Constitution and the subsequent Meech Lake era, and the two Attorney General after whom the ministry's headquarter is named after, were both prominent litigation lawyers before they were in public office. Despite many appearances in the Supreme Court prior to his appointment,Scott appeared only once for the government in the five years he was Attorney General, in the reference regarding the government's ability to provide full funding for Roman Catholic Separate High Schools. McMurtry, who was appointed Chief Justice of Ontario by a Liberal federal government after his political career, appeared twice over his decade at the helm of the ministry, in the 1976 Reference Re Anti-Inflation Act and the 1981 Patriation Reference.

Jim Flaherty argued Ontario's position in R v Sharpe, a possession of child pornography case involving an accused in BC, in which Ontario was an intervenor.

== Portfolios ==
In 2008, the Office of the Independent Police Review Director (IPRD), now the Law Enforcement Complaints Agency, was established under the authority of the Attorney General, as a civilian body with powers invested through Public Inquiries Act to investigate complaints about municipal police forces and the Ontario Provincial Police.

Following the 2013 release of former Supreme Court judge Frank Iacobucci's report on the relationship between Aboriginal peoples and the Ontario justice system, a position of deputy attorney general with responsibility for Aboriginal issues was created.

== List of attorneys-general ==
=== Upper Canada ===
1. John White (Frontenac County) 1791–1800
2. Robert Isaac Dey Gray 1800–1801
3. Thomas Scott 1801–1806
4. William Firth 1807–1812
5. G. D'Arcy Boulton 1814–1818
6. Sir John Robinson, 1st Baronet, of Toronto 1818–1829, acting AG 1812–1814
7. Henry John Boulton 1829–1833
8. Robert Sympson Jameson 1833–1837, last British-appointed AG
9. Christopher Alexander Hagerman 1837–1840, first Canadian-born AG of Upper Canada
10. William Henry Draper 1840–1841, last AG of Upper Canada

=== Province of Canada (Canada West) ===
Portrait	Name	Term of office		Tenure	Ministry Partisan leaning	Note
	William Draper	Feb 10, 1841	Sep 16, 1842	1 year, 218 days	Governor Sydenham/Bagot	
	Robert Baldwin	Sep 17, 1842	December 1, 1843	1 year, 85 days	Lafontaine-Baldwin Reform	(Note: While Joint-premier of the Province of Canada)
	William Draper	Sep 1, 1844	May 28, 1847	2 years, 269 days (4 years, 122 days in total)	Draper Tory	
	Henry Sherwood	May 29, 1847	March 10, 1848	286 days	Sherwood Compact Tory	
	Robert Baldwin	March 11, 1848	Oct 27, 1851	3 years, 230 days (4 years, 315 days in total	Lafontaine-Baldwin Reform	
	William Buell Richards	Oct 28, 1851	June 21, 1853	1 year, 236 days	Hincks-Morin Reform	
	John Ross	June 22, 1853	Sep 10, 1854	1 year, 80 days	Hincks-Morin Reform	
	John A MacDonald	Sep 11, 1854	August 1, 1858	3 years, 324 days	Macdonald-Cartier Liberal Conservative	
	John Sandfield MacDonald	August 2, 1858	August 4, 1858	3 days	Brown–Dorion Reform/Liberal	
	John A MacDonald	August 7, 1858	May 23, 1862	3 years, 289 days	Macdonald-Cartier Liberal Conservative	
	John Sandfield MacDonald	May 24, 1862	March 29, 1864	1 year, 310 days	S. Macdonald-Sicotte/Dorion Reform/Liberal	
	John A MacDonald	March 29, 1864	June 30, 1867	3 years, 93 days (10 years, 341 days in total	Great Coalition Liberal Conservative & Clear Grits	

In 1841, the Upper Canada joined with Lower Canada to form the Province of Canada, within which the area for former Upper Canada became Canada West. The title of the office however was changed to Attorney General for Upper Canada and not "of Canada West". In the executive council of the united province, the two attorney generals were often the joint-premiers, but not always. There were also separate solicitor generals for the two district, but they were not always part of the executive council. Other ministerial portfolios only had one holder.

=== Ontario (since Confederation) ===
Portrait	Name	Term of office		Tenure	Political party (Ministry)	Note
Attorney General
	John Sandfield; Macdonald	July 16, 1867	December 20, 1871	4 years, 157 days (6 years, 104 days in total	Liberal- Conservative (MacDonald)	(Note: While Premier)
	Adam Crooks	December 20, 1871	October 25, 1872	310 days	Liberal (Blake)	
	Oliver Mowat	October 31, 1872	July 21, 1896	23 years, 264 days	Liberal (Mowat)	
	Arthur Sturgis Hardy	July 21, 1896	October 21, 1899	3 years, 92 days	Liberal (Hardy)	
	John Morison Gibson	October 21, 1899	November 22, 1904	5 years, 32 days	Liberal (Ross)	
	Francis Robert Latchford	November 22, 1904	February 8, 1905	78 days	Liberal (Ross)	
	James Whitney	February 8, 1905	May 30, 1905	111 days	Conservative (Whitney)	
	James Joseph Foy	May 30, 1905	October 2, 1914	9 years, 206 days	Conservative (Whitney)	
	James Joseph Foy	October 2, 1914	December 22, 1914	9 years, 206 days	Conservative (Hearst)	
	Isaac Benson Lucas	December 22, 1914	November 14, 1919	4 years, 327 days	Conservative (Hearst)	
	William Raney	November 14, 1919	July 16, 1923	3 years, 244 days	United Farmers (Drury)	
	William Folger Nickle	July 16, 1923	October 18, 1926	3 years, 94 days	Conservative (Ferguson)	
	William Herbert Price	October 18, 1926	December 15, 1930	7 years, 265 days	Conservative (Ferguson)	
	William Herbert Price	December 15, 1930	July 10, 1934	7 years, 265 days	Conservative (Henry)	
	Arthur Roebuck	July 10, 1934	April 14, 1937	2 years, 278 days	Liberal (Hepburn-Conant-Nixon)	(Note: Forced to resigned from cabinet over disagreement on handling of the United Auto Workers strike.)
	Paul Leduc	April 15, 1937	October 12, 1937	180 days	Liberal (Hepburn-Conant-Nixon)	(Note: Interim Attorney General upon Roebuck's resignation, while Minister of Mines)
	Gordon Daniel Conant	October 12, 1937	May 18, 1943	5 years, 218 days	Liberal (Hepburn-Conant-Nixon)	(Note: Assumed premiership on October 21, 1942 and retained the Attorney General portfolio while Premier; resigned both positions on May 18, 1943.)
	Eric Cross	May 18, 1943	August 17, 1943	91 days	Liberal (Hepburn-Conant-Nixon)	(Note: Concurrently Minister of Municipal Affairs)
	Leslie Blackwell	August 17, 1943	May 4, 1949	5 years, 260 days	PC (Drew-Kennedy)	
	Dana Porter	May 4, 1949	August 17, 1955	6 years, 105 days	PC (Frost)	
	Kelso Roberts	August 17, 1955	November 8, 1961	7 years, 69 days	PC (Frost)	
	Kelso Roberts	November 8, 1961	October 25, 1962	7 years, 69 days	PC (Robarts)	
	Fred Cass	October 25, 1962	March 23, 1964	1 year, 150 days	PC (Robarts)	
	Arthur Wishart	March 26, 1964	May 18, 1966	6 years, 340 days	PC (Robarts)	
Minister of Justice and Attorney General				6 years, 340 days	PC (Robarts)	
	Arthur Wishart	May 18, 1966	March 1, 1971	6 years, 340 days	PC (Robarts)	
	Allan Lawrence	March 1, 1971	February 2, 1972	338 days	PC (Davis)	(Note: Concurrently Provincial Secretary for Justice (January 5, 1972, to September 28, 1972).)
	Dalton Bales	February 2, 1972	April 10, 1972	2 years, 24 days	PC (Davis)	
Attorney General				2 years, 24 days	PC (Davis)	
	Dalton Bales	April 10, 1972	February 26, 1974	2 years, 24 days	PC (Davis)	
	Bob Welch	February 26, 1974	July 18, 1975	1 year, 142 days (first instance)	PC (Davis)	(Note: Concurrently Provincial Secretary for Justice)
	John Clement	January 14, 1975	October 7, 1975	266 days	PC (Davis)	(Note: Interim Solicitor General (February 21, 1975 - July 9, 1975))
	Roy McMurtry	October 7, 1975	February 8, 1985	9 years, 124 days	PC (Davis)	(Note: Concurrently Solicitor General (September 11, 1978 – February 13, 1982)) (Note: The building where the ministry's headquarters is located is named jointly after Roy McMurtry and Ian Scott.)
	Bob Welch	February 8, 1985	May 17, 1985	98 days (second instance) (1 year, 240 days in total)	PC (Miller)	(Note: While Deputy Premier)
	Alan Pope	May 17, 1985	June 26, 1985	40 days	PC (Miller)	
	Ian Scott	June 26, 1985	October 1, 1990	5 years, 97 days	Liberal (Peterson)	(Note: Concurrently Minister Responsible for Native Affairs) (Note: Interim Solicitor General (February 3, 1986 – January 9, 1987; June 6, 1989 – August 2, 1989))
	Howard Hampton	October 1, 1990	February 3, 1993	2 years, 125 days	NDP (Rae)	
Minister of Justice and Attorney General					NDP (Rae)	
	Marion Boyd	February 3, 1993	June 26, 1995	2 years, 143 days	NDP (Rae)	(Note: First woman to serve as Attorney General; to date the only Attorney General who was not a lawyer by profession)
Attorney General
	Charles Harnick	June 26, 1995	June 17, 1999	3 years, 356 days	PC (Harris)	
	Jim Flaherty	June 17, 1999	February 7, 2001	1 year, 235 days	PC (Harris)	
	David Young	February 8, 2001	April 15, 2002	2 years, 17 days	PC (Harris)	
	David Young	April 15, 2002	February 25, 2003	2 years, 17 days	PC (Eves)	
	Norm Sterling	February 25, 2003	October 22, 2003	239 days	PC (Eves)	
	Michael J. Bryant	October 23, 2003	October 30, 2007	4 years, 7 days	Liberal (McGuinty)	(Note: Concurrently Minister Responsible for Democratic Renewal (October 23, 2003 – June 29, 2005))
	Chris Bentley	October 30, 2007	October 20, 2011	3 years, 355 days	Liberal (McGuinty)	(Note: Concurrently Minister Responsible for Native Affairs (January 18, 2010 – October 20, 2011))
	John Gerretsen	October 20, 2011	February 11, 2013	2 years, 156 days	Liberal (McGuinty)	
	John Gerretsen	February 11, 2013	March 25, 2014	2 years, 156 days	Liberal (Wynne)	
	Madeleine Meilleur	June 24, 2014	June 13, 2016	1 year, 355 days	Liberal (Wynne)	(Note: Concurrently Minister Responsible for Francophone Affairs) (Note: First francophone to serve as Attorney General)
	Yasir Naqvi	June 13, 2016	June 29, 2018	2 years, 16 days	Liberal (Wynne)	(Note: First visible-minority and first Muslim to serve as Attorney General.)
	Caroline Mulroney	June 29, 2018	June 20, 2019	356 days	PC (Ford)	(Note: Licensed to practice law in New York; not licensed to practice law in Ontario, and was called to the bar of Ontario in 2023 via entitlement as a former Attorney General three days prior to being appointed King's Counsel.)
	Doug Downey	June 20, 2019	present	7 years, 154 days	PC (Ford)	

== See also ==
- Government of Ontario
