= Vagrancy =

Condition of homelessness without regular employment or income

John Everett Millais' The Blind Girl, depicting a vagrant musician

Vagrancy is the condition of wandering homelessness without regular employment or income. Vagrants (Note: Also known as bums, vagabonds, rogues, tramps, or drifters.) usually live in poverty and support themselves by travelling while engaging in begging, scavenging, or petty theft. In Western countries, vagrancy was historically a crime punishable with forced labor, military service, imprisonment, or confinement to dedicated labor houses.

Both vagrant and vagabond ultimately derive from the Latin word vagari, meaning "to wander". The term vagabond and its archaic equivalent vagabone come from Latin vagabundus ("strolling about"). In Middle English, vagabond originally denoted a person without a home or employment.

== Historical views ==
Vagrants have been historically characterised as outsiders in settled, ordered communities: embodiments of otherness, objects of scorn or mistrust, or worthy recipients of help and charity.

Some ancient sources show vagrants as passive objects of pity, who deserve generosity and the gift of alms. Others show them as subversives, or outlaws, who make a parasitical living through theft, fear and threat.

Gyrovagues were itinerant monks of the early Middle Ages. Some fairy tales of medieval Europe have beggars cast curses on anyone who was insulting or stingy toward them. In Tudor England, some of those who begged door-to-door for "milk, yeast, drink, pottage" were thought to be witches.

Many world religions, both in history and today, have vagrant traditions or make reference to vagrants. In Christianity, Jesus is shown in the Bible as having compassion for beggars, prostitutes, and the disenfranchised. The Catholic Church also teaches compassion for people living in vagrancy. Vagrant lifestyles are seen in Christian movements, such as in the mendicant orders. Many still exist in places like Europe, Africa, and the Near East, as preserved by Gnosticism, Hesychasm, and various esoteric practices.

In some East Asian and South Asian countries, the condition of vagrancy has long been historically associated with the religious life, as described in the religious literature of Hindu, Buddhist, Jain, and Muslim Sufi traditions. Examples include sadhus, dervishes, bhikkhus, and the sramanic traditions generally.

== In law ==
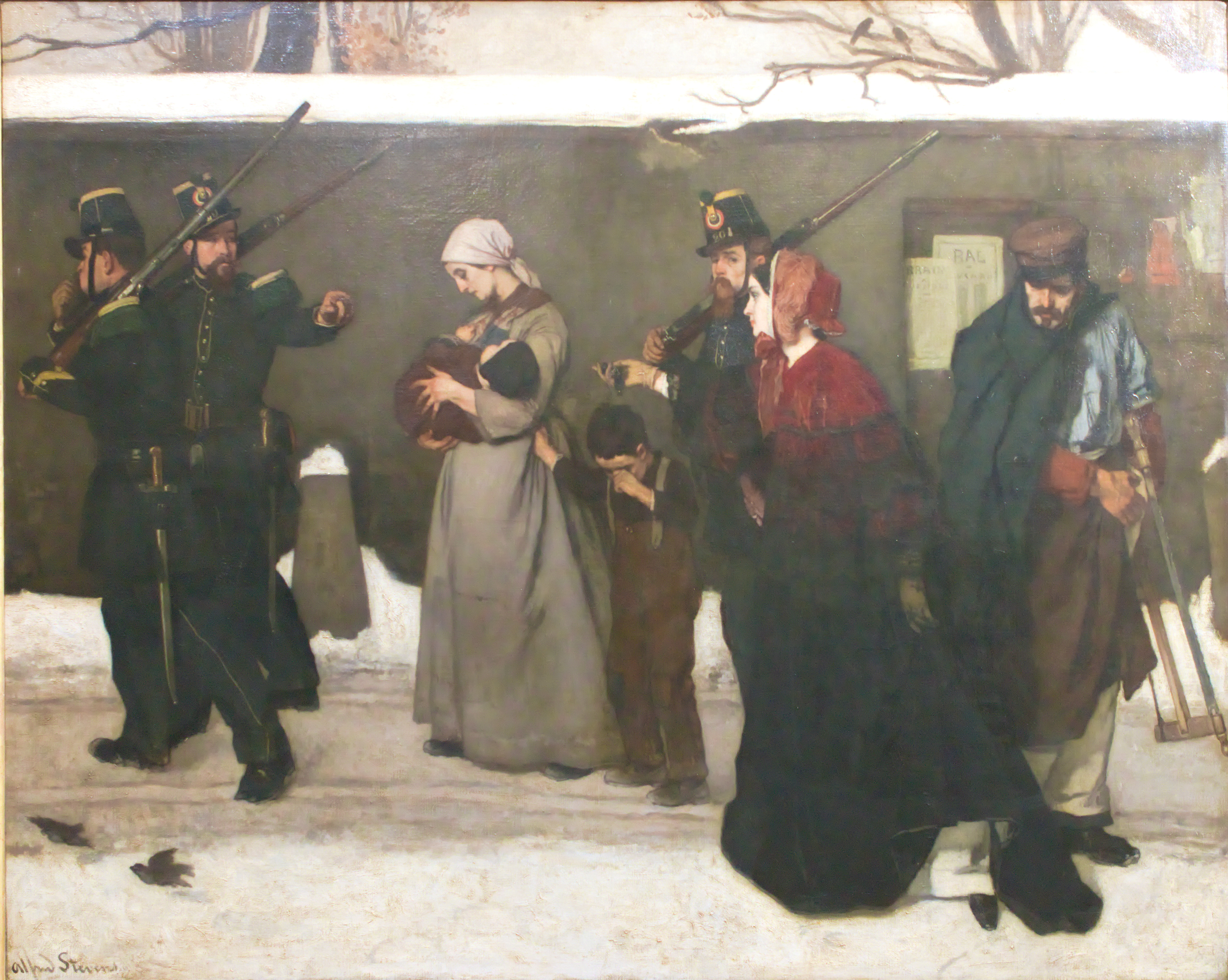
Vagabonds being arrested in 19th century France

=== Belgium ===
The Belgian Criminal Law had defined vagrants as lacking a stable residence, the necessary means to survive, and employment. The Belgian Criminal Law of 1867 had high levels of recidivism, leading to questions concerning its effectiveness in combating vagrancy From 27 November 1891, a vagabond could be jailed. Vagabonds, beggars and procurers were imprisoned in vagrancy prisons: Hoogstraten; Merksplas; and Wortel (Flanders). There, the prisoners had to work for their living by working on the land or in the prison. If the prisoners had earned enough money, then they could leave the "colony" (as it was called). On 12 January 1993, the Belgian vagrancy law was repealed. At that time, 260 vagabonds still lived in the Wortel colony.

=== Denmark ===
In medieval times, vagabonds were controlled by an official called the Stodderkonge who was responsible for a town or district and expelled those without a permit. Their role eventually transferred to the police.

=== Germany ===
In Germany, according to the 1871 Penal Code (§ 361 des Strafgesetzbuches von 1871), vagabondage was among the grounds to confine a person to a labor house.

In the Weimar Republic, the law against vagrancy was relaxed, but it became much more stringent in Nazi Germany, where vagrancy, together with begging, prostitution, and "work-shyness" (arbeitsscheu), was classified as "anti-social behavior" (Asoziale) and punishable by confinement to concentration camps.

=== Romania ===
Until July 2006, vagrancy was punishable with imprisonment between one month to 3 years, according to the article 327 on the Penal Code.

=== Russia ===
==== Russian Empire ====
In the Russian Empire, the legal term "vagrancy" (Russian: бродяжничество, brodyazhnichestvo) was defined in a different way than in Western Europe (vagabondage in France, Landstreicherei in Germany). Russian law recognized one as a vagrant if he could not prove his own standing (title), or if he changed residence without a permission from authorities, rather than punishing loitering or absence of livelihood. Foreigners who had been twice expatriated with prohibition of return to the Russian Empire and were arrested in Russia again were also recognized as vagrants. Punishments were harsh: according to Ulozhenie, the legal code, a vagrant who could not elaborate on his kinship, standing, or permanent residence, or gave false evidence, was sentenced to a 4-year imprisonment and a subsequent exile to Siberia or another far-off province.

==== Soviet Union ====
In the Criminal Code of the RSFSR (1960), which came into force on 1 January 1961, systematic vagrancy (that which was identified more than once) was punishable by up to two years' imprisonment (section 209).

This continued until 5 December 1991, when Section 209 was repealed and vagrancy ceased to be a criminal offense.

==== Russian Federation ====
At present, vagrancy is not a criminal offence in Russia, but it is an offence for someone over 18 to induce a juvenile (one who has not reached that age) to vagrancy, according to Chapter 20, Section 151 of the Criminal Code of the Russian Federation. The note, introduced by the Federal Law No. 162 of 8 December 2003, provides that the section does not apply, if such act is performed by a parent of the juvenile under harsh life circumstances due to the loss of livelihood or the absence of living place.

=== Mexico ===
In the early 1800s, Mexico's political leaders had to put together a "Vagrant Tribunal", defining vagrants as young men who were robust and able to work despite panhandling. These tribunals had become a necessity after President Vicente Guerrero abolished slavery in 1829, leaving Mexico without a constant supply of labor. Those who were punished under this system were either put in local jails for a short time or sent to armed forces. This system was abolished during the Mexican–American War to increase conscripts.

=== Sweden and Finland ===
In premodern Sweden and Finland (under Swedish rule up to 1809), vagrancy was a crime, which could result in a sentence of forced labour or forced military service. There was a "legal protection" (Finnish: laillinen suojelu) obligation: those not part of the estates of the realm (nobility, clergy, burghers or land-owners) were obliged to be employed, or otherwise, they could be charged with vagrancy. Legal protection was mandatory already in medieval Swedish law, but Gustav I of Sweden began strictly enforcing this provision, applying it even when work was potentially available. In Finland, the legal protection provision was repealed in 1883; however, vagrancy still remained illegal, if connected with "immoral" or "indecent" behavior. In 1936, a new law moved the emphasis from criminalization into social assistance. Forced labor sentences were abolished in 1971 and anti-vagrancy laws were repealed in 1987.

=== United Kingdom ===
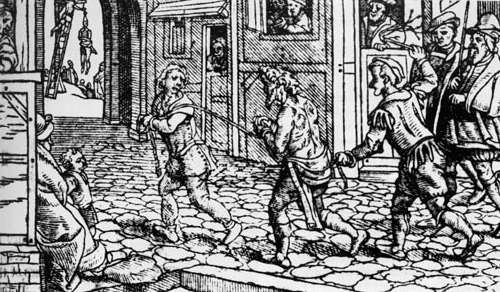
A woodcut from c. 1536 depicting a vagrant being punished in the streets in Tudor England

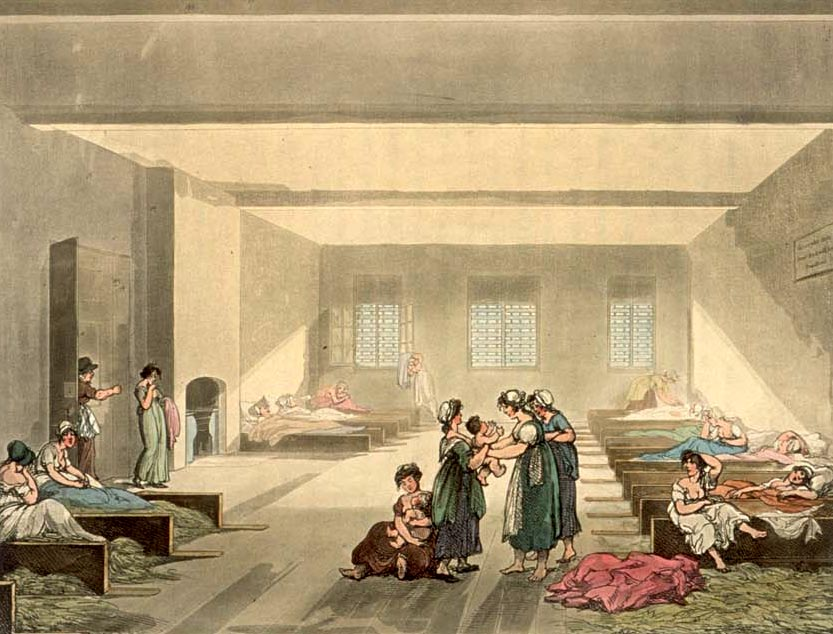
The Pass Room at Bridewell, c. 1808. At this time paupers from outside London apprehended by the authorities could be imprisoned for seven days before being sent back to their own parish.

The Ordinance of Labourers 1349 was the first major vagrancy law in England and Wales. The ordinance sought to increase the available workforce following the Black Death in England by making idleness (unemployment) an offence. A vagrant was a person who could work but chose not to, and, having no fixed abode or lawful occupation, begged. Vagrancy was punishable by human branding or whipping. Vagrants were distinguished from the impotent poor, who were unable to support themselves because of advanced age or sickness. In the Vagabonds Act 1530, Henry VIII decreed that "beggars who are old and incapable of working receive a beggar's licence. On the other hand, [there should be] whipping and imprisonment for sturdy vagabonds. They are to be tied to the cart-tail and whipped until the blood streams from their bodies, then they are to swear on oath to go back to their birthplace or to serve where they have lived the last three years and to 'put themselves to labour'. For the second arrest for vagabondage the whipping is to be repeated and half the ear sliced off; but for the third relapse the offender is to be executed as a hardened criminal and enemy of the common weal."

In the Vagabonds Act 1547, Edward VI ordained that "if anyone refuses to work, he shall be condemned as a slave to the person who has denounced him as an idler. The master has the right to force him to do any work, no matter how vile, with whip and chains. If the slave is absent for a fortnight, he is condemned to slavery for life and is to be branded on forehead or back with the letter S; if he runs away three times, he is to be executed as a felon. ... If it happens that a vagabond has been idling about for three days, he is to be taken to his birthplace, branded with a red hot iron with the letter V on his breast, and set to work, in chains, on the roads or at some other labour. ... Every master may put an iron ring round the neck, arms or legs of his slave, by which to know him more easily."

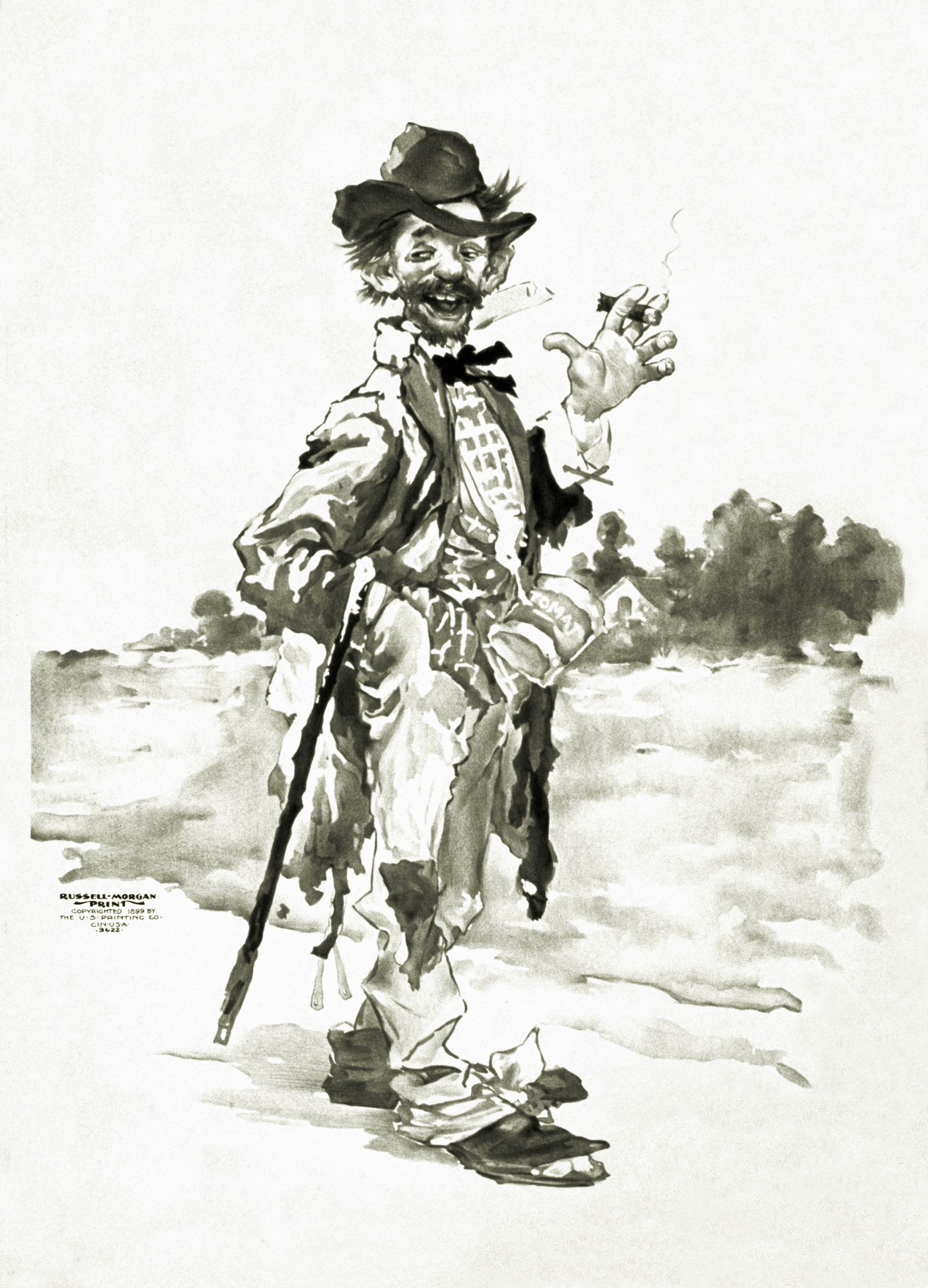
Caricature of a tramp

In England, the Vagabonds Act 1572 passed under Elizabeth I, defined a rogue as a person who had no land, no master, and no legitimate trade or source of income; it included rogues in the class of vagrants or vagabonds. If a person were apprehended as a rogue, he would be stripped to the waist, whipped until bleeding, and a hole, about the compass of an inch about, would be burned through the cartilage of his right ear with a hot iron. A rogue who was charged with a second offence, unless taken in by someone who would give him work for one year, could face execution as a felony. A rogue charged with a third offence would only escape death if someone hired him for two years.

The Vagabonds Act 1572 decreed that "unlicensed beggars above fourteen years of age are to be severely flogged and branded on the left ear unless someone will take them into service for two years; in case of a repetition of the offence, if they are over eighteen, they are to be executed, unless someone will take them into service for two years; but for the third offence they are to be executed without mercy as felons." The same act laid the legal groundwork for the enforced exile (penal transportation) of "obdurate idlers" to "such parts beyond the seas as shall be […] assigned by the Privy Council". At the time, this meant exile for a fixed term to the Virginia Company's plantations in America. Those who returned unlawfully from their place of exile faced death by hanging.

The Vagabonds Act 1597 banished and transplanted "incorrigible and dangerous rogues" overseas.

In Das Kapital (Capital Volume One, Chapter Twenty-Eight: Bloody Legislation Against the Expropriated, from the End of the 15th Century. Forcing Down of Wages by Acts of Parliament), Karl Marx wrote:

James 1: Any one wandering about and begging is declared a rogue and a vagabond. Justices of the peace in petty sessions are authorised to have them publicly whipped and for the first offence to imprison them for 6 months, for the second for 2 years. Whilst in prison they are to be whipped as much and as often as the justices of the peace think fit … Incorrigible and dangerous rogues are to be branded with an R on the left shoulder and set to hard labour, and if they are caught begging again, to be executed without mercy. These statutes, legally binding until the beginning of the 18th century, were only repealed by 12 Anne, c. 23.

In late-eighteenth-century Middlesex, those suspected of vagrancy could be detained by the constable or watchman and brought before a magistrate who had the legal right to interview them to determine their status. If declared vagrant, they were to be arrested, whipped, and physically expelled from the county by a vagrant contractor, whose job it was to take them to the edge of the county and pass them to the contractor for the next county on the journey. This process would continue until the person reached his or her place of legal settlement, which was often but not always their place of birth.

In 1795, the Speenhamland system (also known as the Berkshire Bread Act) tried to address some of the problems that underlay vagrancy. The Speenhamland system was a form of outdoor relief intended to mitigate rural poverty in England and Wales at the end of the 18th century and during the early 19th century. The law was an amendment to the Elizabethan Poor Law. It was created as an indirect result of Britain's involvements in the French Revolutionary and Napoleonic Wars (1793–1815).

In 1821, the existing vagrancy law was reviewed by a House of Commons select committee, resulting in the publication of the, Report from the Select Committee on The Existing Laws Relating to Vagrants. After hearing the views of many witnesses appearing before it the select committee made several recommendations. The select committee found that the existing vagrancy laws had become over-complicated and that they should be amended and consolidated into a single act of Parliament. The payment of fixed rewards for the apprehension and taking vagrants before magistrates had led to abuses of the system. Due to the Poor Laws, vagrants to receive poverty relief had to seek it from the parish where they were last legally settled, often the parish where they were born. This led to a system of convicted vagrants being 'passed' from parish to parish from where they had been convicted and punished to their own parish. The 'pass' system led to them being transported by vagrancy contractors, a system found to be open to abuses and fraud. It also found that in many instances the punishment for vagrancy offences were insufficient and certain types of vagrants should be given longer prison sentences and made to complete hard labour during it.

Based on the findings and recommendations from the 1821 House of Commons Select on Vagrancy, a new Act of Parliament was introduced, 'An Act for the Punishment of Idle and Disorderly Persons, and Rogues and Vagabonds, in that Part of Great Britain called England', commonly known as the Vagrancy Act 1824. The Vagrancy Act 1824 consolidated the previous vagrancy laws and addressed many of the frauds and abuses identified during the select committee hearings. Much reformed since 1824, some of the offences included in it are still enforceable.

=== United States ===
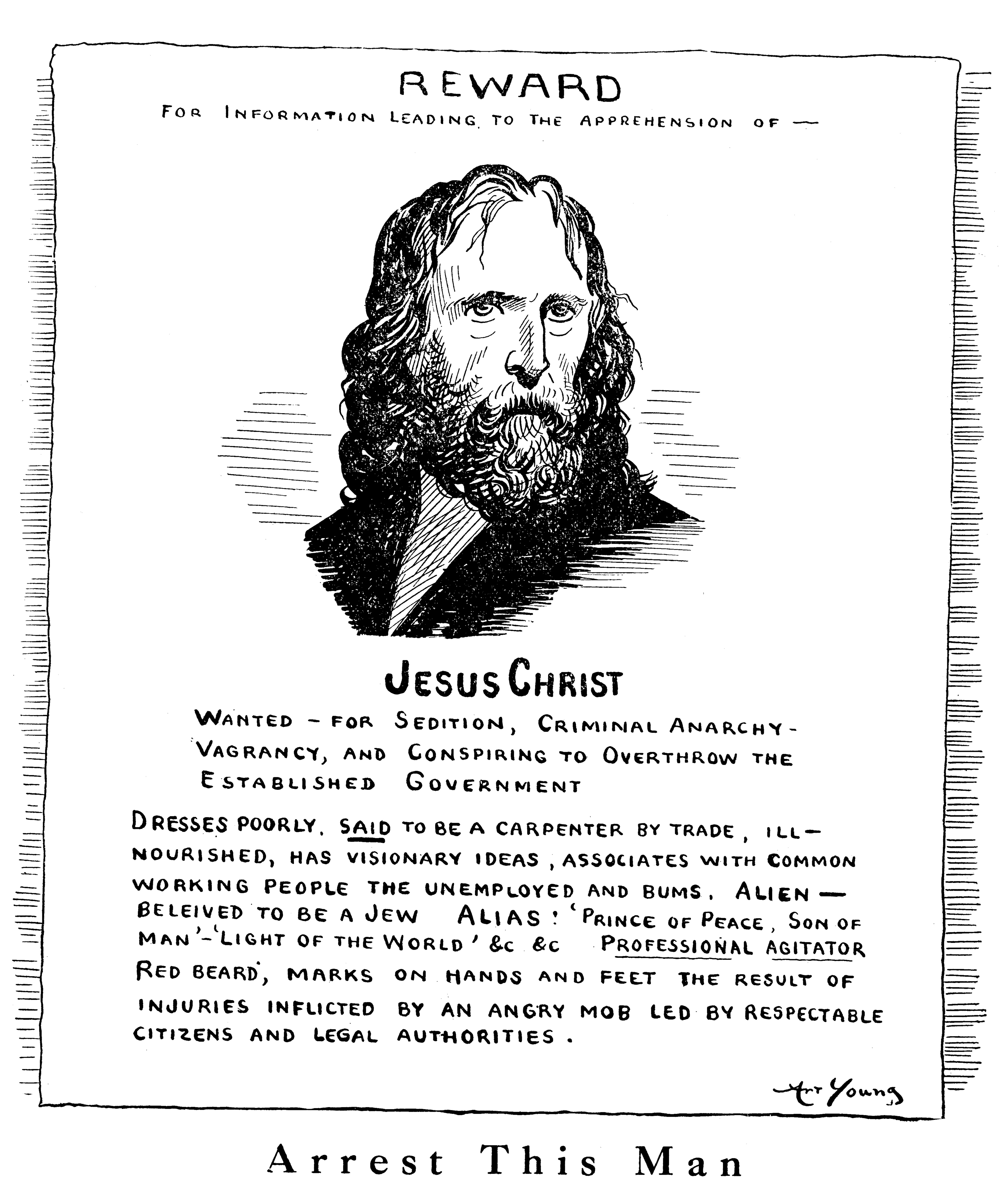
Political cartoon by Art Young, The Masses, 1917

==== Colonial Era ====
Colonists imported British vagrancy laws when they settled in North America. Throughout the colonial and early national periods, vagrancy laws were used to police the mobility and economic activities of the poor. People experiencing homelessness and ethnic minorities were especially vulnerable to arrest as a vagrant. Thousands of inhabitants of colonial and early national America were incarcerated for vagrancy, usually for terms of 30 to 60 days, but occasionally longer.

==== Post-Civil War ====
After the American Civil War, some Southern states passed Black Codes, laws that tried to control the hundreds of thousands of freed slaves. In 1866, the state of Virginia, fearing that it would be "overrun with dissolute and abandoned characters", passed an Act Providing for the Punishment of Vagrants. Homeless or unemployed persons could be forced into labour on public or private works, for very low pay, for a statutory maximum of three months; if fugitive and recaptured, they must serve the rest of their term at minimum subsistence, wearing ball and chain. In effect, though not in declared intent, the Act criminalized attempts by impoverished freed people to seek out their own families and rebuild their lives. The commanding general in Virginia, Alfred H. Terry, condemned the Act as a form of entrapment, the attempted reinstitution of "slavery in all but its name". He forbade its enforcement. It is not known how often it was applied, or what was done to prevent its implementation, but it remained statute in Virginia until 1904. Other Southern states enacted similar laws to funnel blacks into their system of convict leasing.

Since at least as early as the 1930s, a vagrancy law in America typically has rendered "no visible means of support" a misdemeanor, yet it has commonly been used as a pretext to take one into custody for such things as loitering, prostitution, drunkenness, or criminal association. Prior to 2020, the criminal statutes of law in Louisiana specifically criminalized vagrancy as associating with prostitutes, being a professional gambler, being a habitual drunk, or living on the social welfare benefits or pensions of others. This law established as vagrants all those healthy adults who are not engaged in gainful employment.

Vagrancy laws proven unacceptably broad and vague may have been found to violate the due process clause of the Fourteenth Amendment to the United States Constitution. Such laws could no longer be used to obstruct the "freedom of speech" of a political demonstrator or an unpopular group. Ambiguous vagrancy laws became more narrowly and clearly defined.

In Papachristou v. City of Jacksonville, 405 U.S. 156 (1972), the Supreme Court of the United States ruled that a Florida vagrancy law was unconstitutional because it was too vague to be understood.

Nevertheless, new local laws in the U.S. have been passed to criminalize aggressive panhandling.

== See also ==
- Anti-homelessness legislation
- Gutter punk
- Quêteux
- Hobo, an impoverished, migrant worker
- List of homelessness organizations
- Mopery, a catchall criminal charge for minor offenses such as loitering
- Nomad, someone with no established residence who frequently moves to and from the same areas
- Parasitism (social offense), a label for those deemed to contribute insufficiently to society
- Squatting, the action of occupying an abandoned area or structure
- Simple living, the voluntary practice of doing without many possessions
- Asceticism
