= Begging =

Demanding favors in public

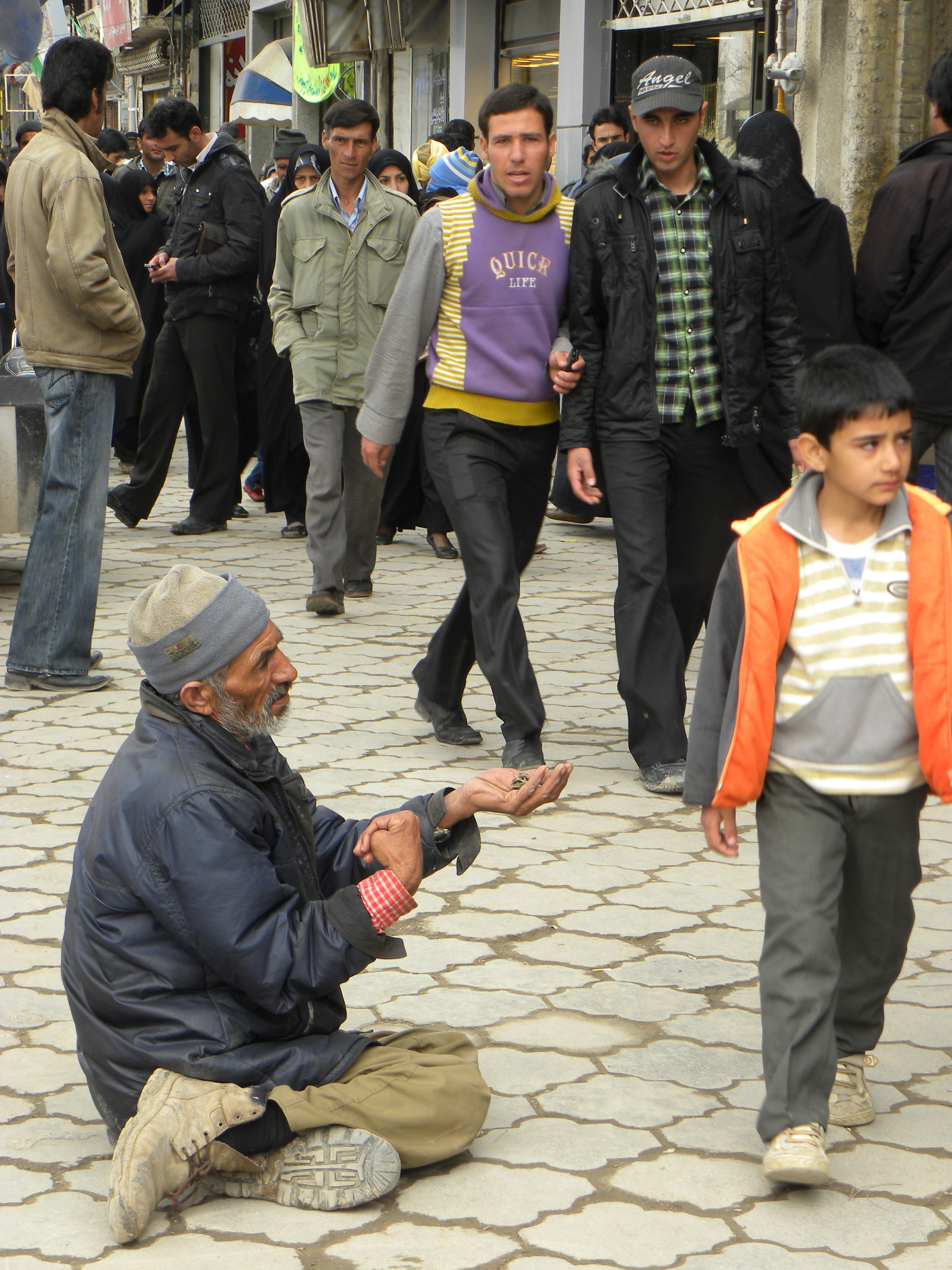
Beggar in the street of Nishapur, Iran, 2009

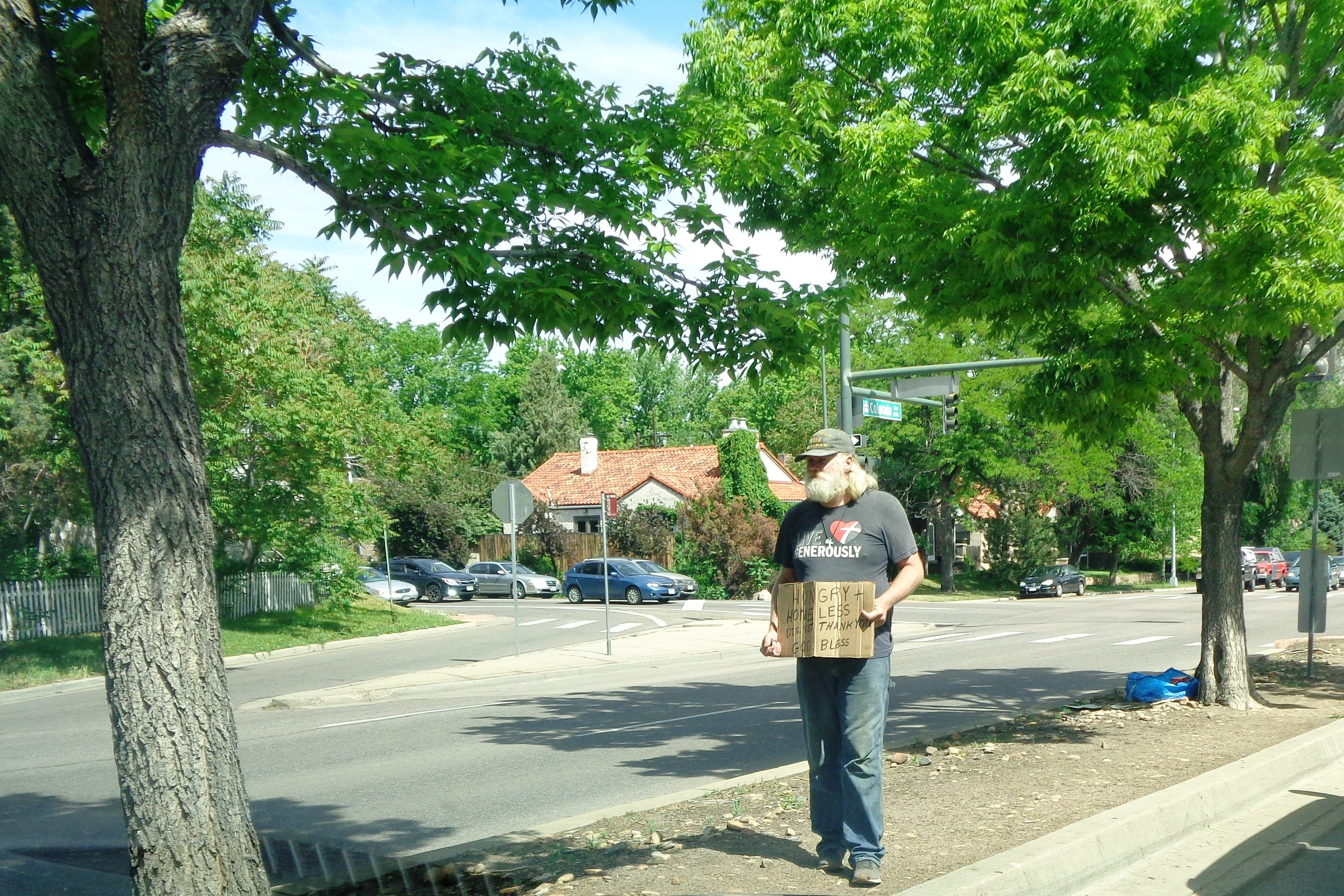
Begging directed at passing traffic, Denver, Colorado, 2018

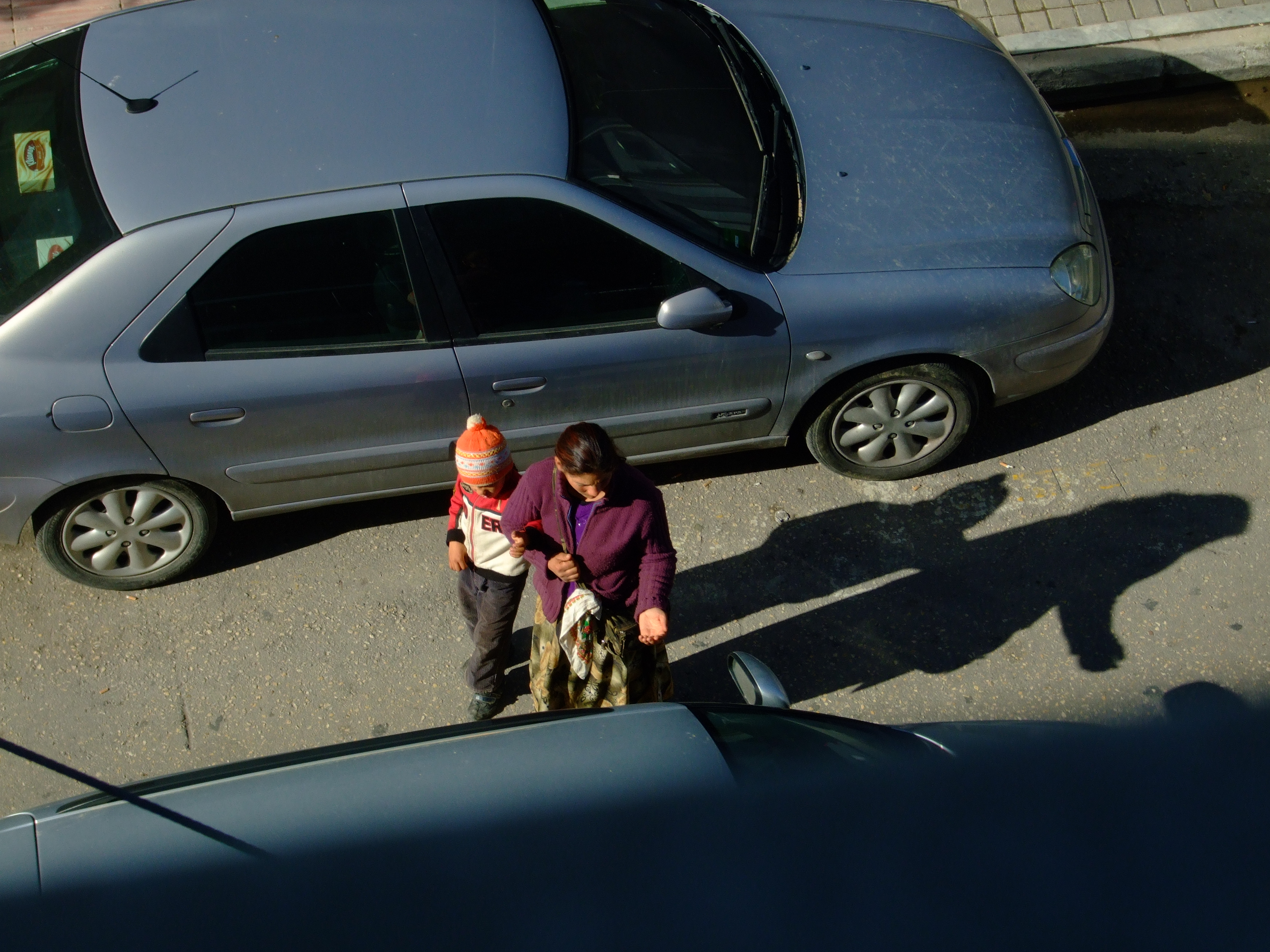
Begging at traffic lights in Patras, Greece, 2010

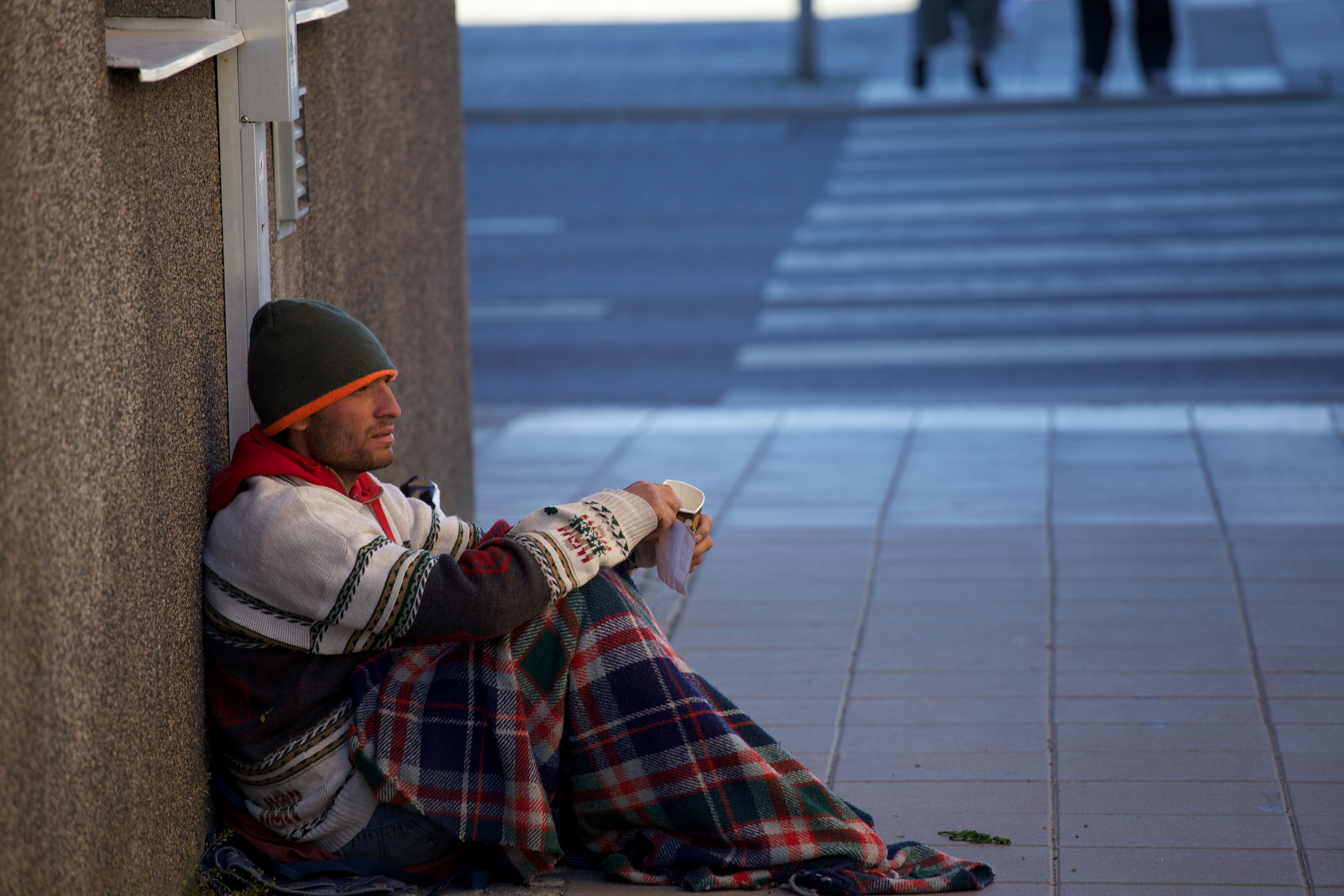
Beggar in Uppsala, Sweden, 2014

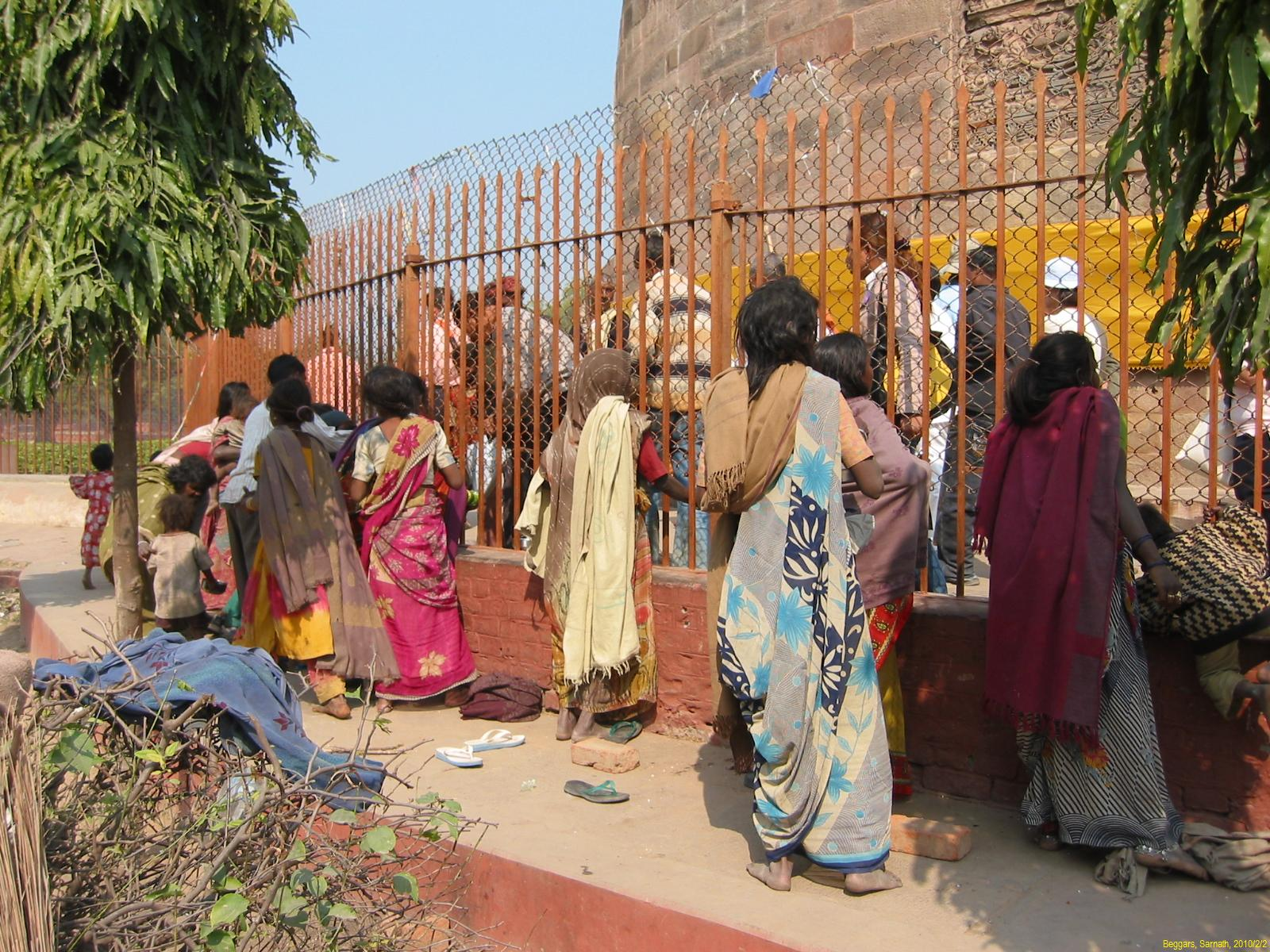
Begging from visitors to a holy site, Sarnath, India, 2010

Begging (also known in North America as panhandling) is the practice of imploring others to grant a favor, often a gift of money, with little or no expectation of reciprocation. A person doing such is called a beggar or panhandler. Beggars may operate in public places such as transport routes, urban parks, and markets. Besides money, they may also ask for food, drink, cigarettes or other small items.

Internet begging is the modern practice of asking people to give money to others via the Internet, rather than in person. Internet begging may encompass requests for help meeting basic needs such as medical care and shelter, as well as requests for people to pay for vacations, school trips, and other things that the beggar wants but cannot ostensibly afford.

Beggars differ from religious mendicants in that some mendicants do not ask for money. Their subsistence is reciprocated by providing society with various forms of religious service, moral education, and preservation of culture.

Passersby often prefer to give beggars food or water rather than cash.

== History ==
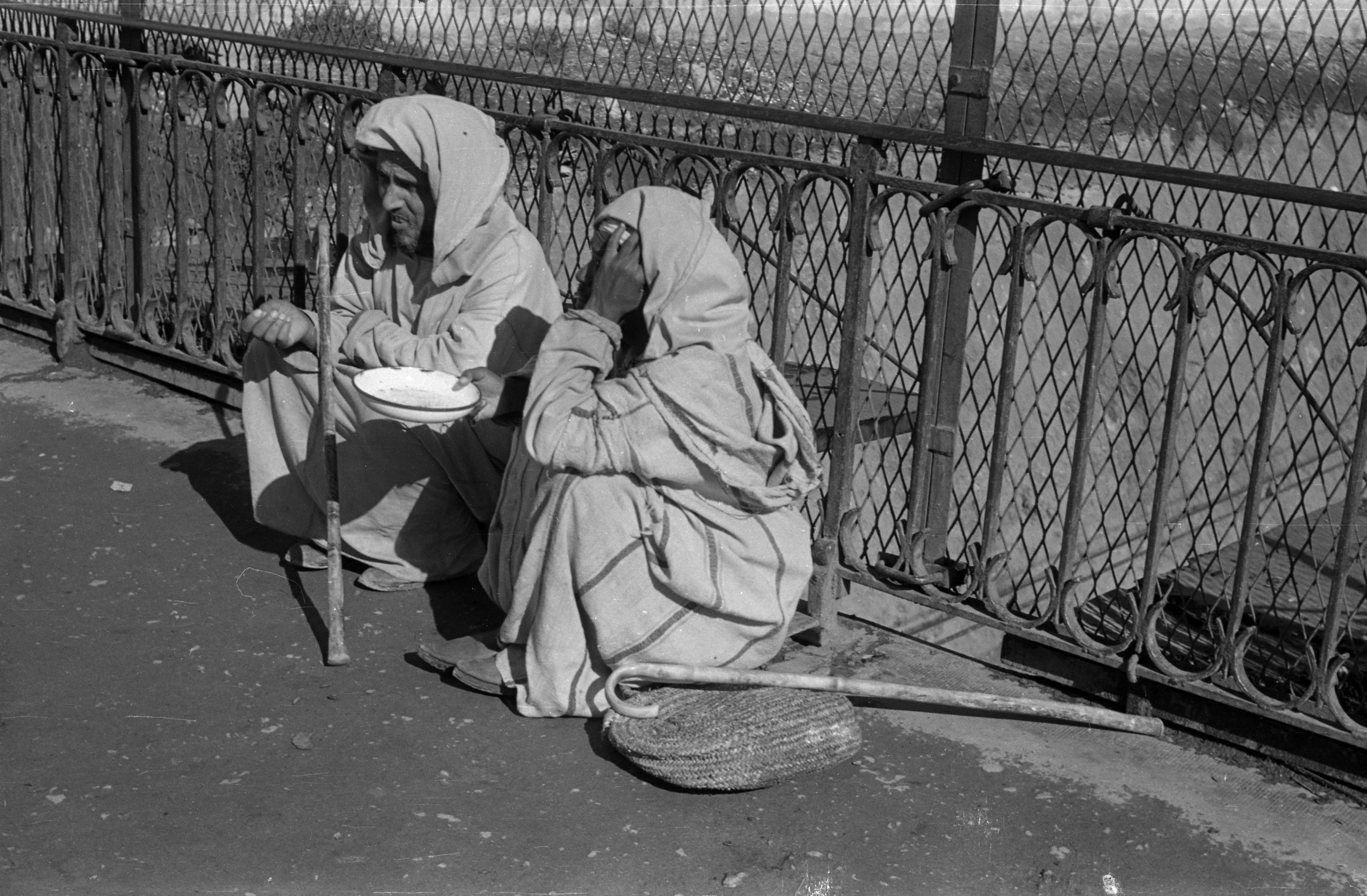
Two beggars in Rabat (Morocco), 1960.

Beggars have existed in human society since the dawn of recorded history. Street begging has happened in most societies around the world, though its prevalence and exact form vary.

=== Greece ===
Ancient Greeks distinguished between the pénēs (Greek: πένης, "active poor") and the ptōchós (Greek: πτωχός, "passive poor"). The pénēs was somebody with a job, only not enough to make a living, while the ptōchós depended on others entirely. The working poor were accorded a higher social status. The New Testament contains several references to Jesus' status as the savior of the ptōchós, usually translated as "the poor", considered the most wretched portion of society. In the rich man and Lazarus parable, Lazarus is called ptōchós and presented as living in extreme poverty. Agyrtae (ἀγύρται) were wandering beggars or alms collectors in ancient Greece, often linked to religious practices and fortune-telling. They were generally seen as disreputable figures, sometimes offering to perform harmful acts for payment or to obtain forgiveness from the gods whom they served for any sins. Their presence extended to Italy with the spread of the cult of Isis, Cybele and other such deities, but Roman law tightly regulated their activities, Romans called them aeruscatores.

=== Great Britain ===
A Caveat or Warning for Common Cursitors, vulgarly called vagabonds, was first published in 1566 by Thomas Harman. From early modern England, another example is Robert Greene in his coney-catching pamphlets, the titles of which included "The Defence of Conny-catching", in which he argued there were worse crimes to be found among "reputable" people. The Beggar's Opera is a ballad opera in three acts written in 1728 by John Gay. The Life and Adventures of Bampfylde Moore Carew was first published in 1745. There are similar writers for many European countries in the early modern period.

According to Jackson J. Spielvogel, "Poverty was a highly visible problem in the eighteenth century, both in cities and in the countryside... Beggars in Bologna were estimated at 25 percent of the population; in Mainz, figures indicate that 30 percent of the people were beggars or prostitutes... In France and Britain by the end of the century, an estimated 10 percent of the people depended on charity or begging for their food."

The British Poor Laws, dating from the Renaissance, placed various restrictions on begging. At various times, begging was restricted to the disabled. This system developed into the workhouse, a state-operated institution where those unable to obtain other employment were forced to work in often grim conditions in exchange for a small amount of food. The welfare state of the 20th century greatly reduced the number of beggars by directly providing for the necessities of the poor from state funds.

=== India ===
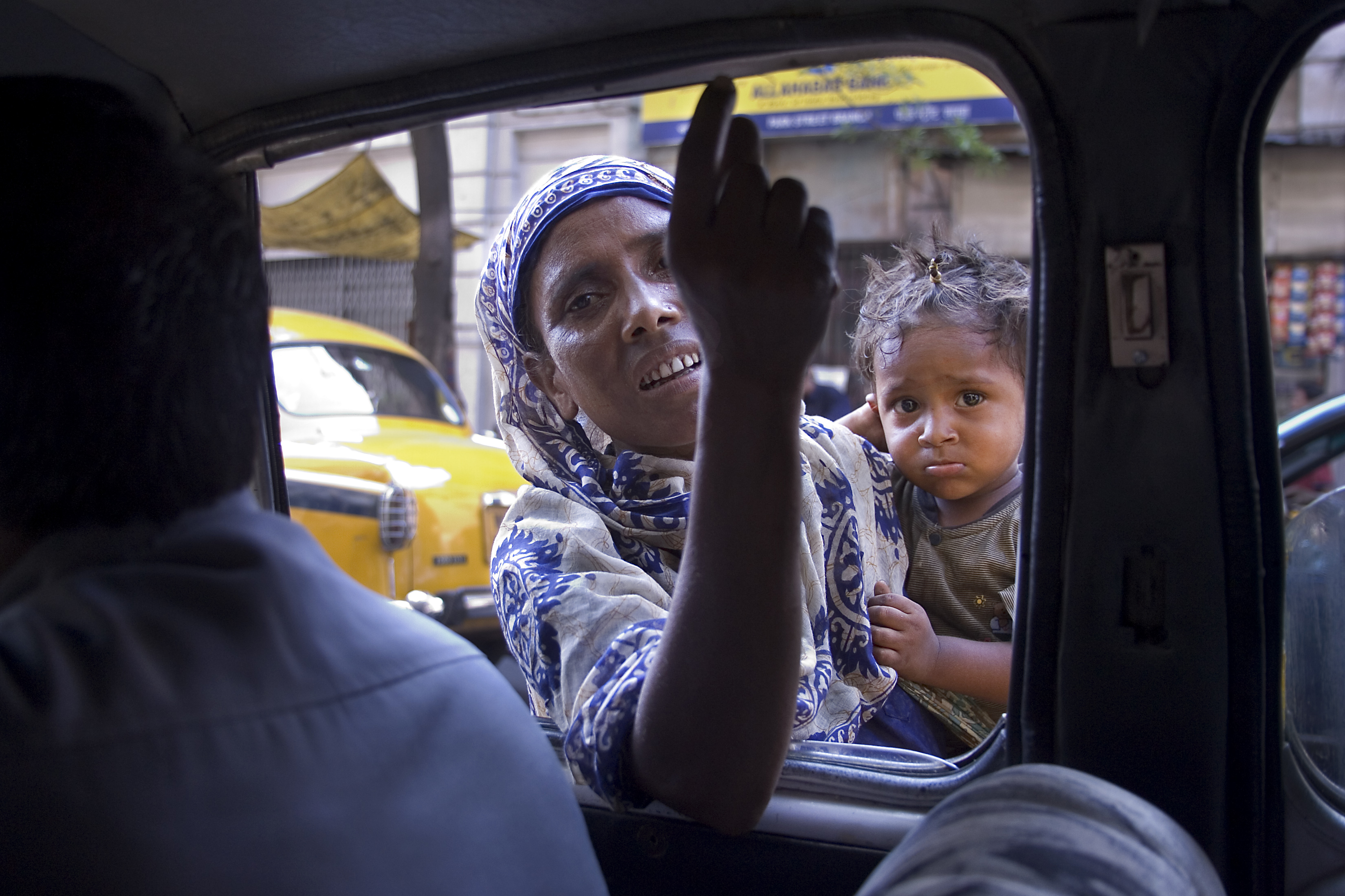
A street beggar in Kolkata reaches into a car

Begging is an age-old social phenomenon in India. In the medieval and earlier times begging was considered to be an acceptable occupation which was embraced within the traditional social structure. This system of begging and almsgiving to mendicants and the poor is still widely practiced in India, with over 500,000 beggars in 2015.

In contemporary India, beggars are often stigmatized as undeserving. People often believe that beggars are not destitute and instead call them professional beggars. There is a wide perception of begging scams. This view is refuted by grassroots research organizations such as Aashray Adhikar Abhiyan, which claim that beggars and other homeless people are overwhelmingly destitute and vulnerable. Their studies indicate that 99 percent of men and 97 percent of women resort to beggary due to abject poverty, distress migration from rural villages and the unavailability of employment.

=== China ===
==== Ming dynasty ====
After the establishment of the Ming dynasty, many farmers and unemployed laborers in Beijing were forced to beg to survive. Begging was especially difficult during Ming times due to high taxes that limited the disposable income of most individuals. Beijing's harsh winters were a difficult challenge for beggars. To avoid freezing to death, some beggars paid porters one copper coin to sleep in their warehouse for the night. Others turned to burying themselves in manure and eating arsenic to avoid the pain of the cold. Thousands of beggars died of poison and exposure to the elements every year.

Begging was some people's primary occupation. A Qing dynasty source states that "professional beggars" were not considered to be destitute, and as such were not allowed to receive government relief, such as food rations, clothing, and shelter. Beggars would often perform, or train animals to perform, to earn money from passers-by. Although beggars were of low status in Ming, they were considered to have higher social standing than prostitutes, entertainers, runners, and soldiers.

Some individuals capitalized on beggars and became "Beggar Chiefs". Beggar chiefs provided security in the form of food for beggars and in return received a portion of beggars' daily earnings as tribute. Beggar chiefs would often lend their surplus income back to beggars and charge interest, furthering their subjects' dependence on them to the point of near slavery. Although beggar chiefs could acquire significant wealth, they were still looked upon as low-class citizens. The title of beggar chief was often passed down family lines and could stick with an individual through occupational changes.

== Ritualized begging and customs ==
In many cultures, begging is not only an act of individual desperation but is integrated into communal rituals, seasonal cycles, and religious observances. Anthropologists often categorize these practices as "ritualized begging" or "reciprocal exchange", where the seeker provides a spiritual or entertainment-related service (such as prayers, songs, or blessings) in exchange for food, drink, or money. In these contexts, the "beggar" is often not a permanent member of the indigent class but a neighbor or child assuming a temporary ritual role.

=== Religious and monastic traditions ===
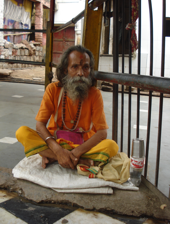
A mendicant outside Kalkaji Mandir in Delhi, India

Many religions have prescribed begging as the primary means of support for certain classes of adherents, including Hinduism, Sufism, Buddhism, and Christianity. In this context, mendicancy typically provides a way for adherents to focus exclusively on spiritual development without the distractions of worldly affairs.

In Dharmic religions, the practice of Bhiksha involves monastics or ascetics seeking alms from laypeople. Unlike secular begging, Bhiksha is viewed as a merit-earning opportunity for the donor, who receives spiritual guidance or blessings in exchange for sustenance. The practitioner is not seen as a "beggar" in a derogatory sense, but as an essential part of the religious ecosystem. In modern Myanmar, Thailand, and Cambodia, householders often provide food to monks daily to gain religious merit.

In the Abrahamic religions, charity and almsgiving are central tenets. Tzedakah in Judaism requires a monetary tithe (often 10% of income) to be given to the poor. In Christianity, the example of Jesus, who encouraged his disciples to "take nothing for their journey", inspired mendicant orders such as the Franciscans and Dominicans.

Historically, religious begging could also lead to significant social mobility. Zhu Yuanzhang, founder of the Ming Dynasty, spent his youth as a mendicant monk begging for food during a famine before rising to power.

=== Folk and seasonal traditions ===
Aside from permanent religious roles, various cultures maintain seasonal customs involving door-to-door processions where participants solicit rewards in exchange for performances or blessings.

- Souling: Historically practiced during Allhallowtide, "souling" involved the poor or children singing "souling songs" and offering prayers for the deceased in exchange for "soul cakes".
- Wassailing: A Christmas and Twelfth Night custom where wassailers offered a drink from a "wassail bowl" and sang carols to wish health to householders in exchange for food or money.
- Heischebrauch: A German term for "petitioning customs", including the Sternsinger (Star Singers) during Epiphany and Fastnacht (Carnival) traditions where masked participants solicit treats.
- Gregori-singen: A Central European school tradition associated with Gregoriusfest, where children sang hymns in honor of Pope Gregory I to solicit school supplies or food.

=== Modern evolution ===
In contemporary secular society, ritualized begging survives primarily in the form of trick-or-treating during Halloween. While the "trick" (a threat of mischief) was historically a more aggressive part of the exchange, modern practice has largely shifted toward a symbolic social interaction limited to children.

== Legal restrictions ==
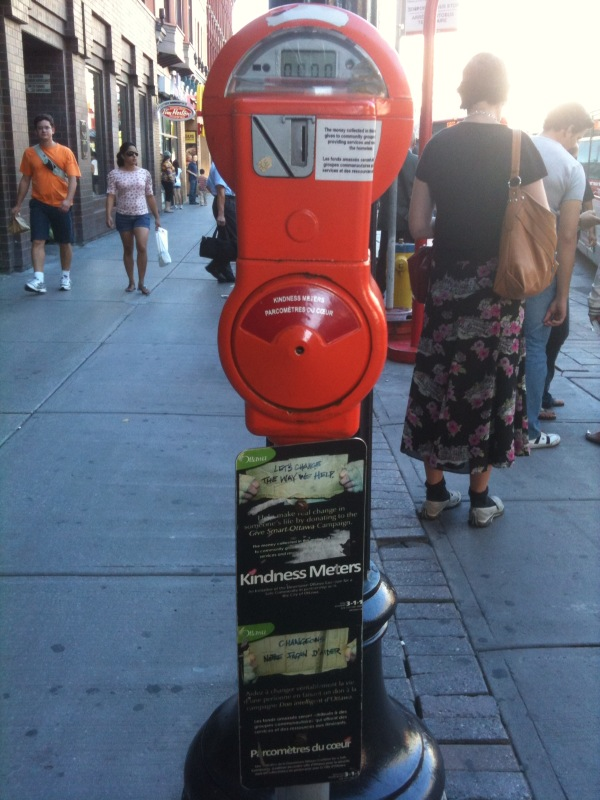
A kindness meter (below the red parking meter) in Ottawa, Ontario, Canada. The meter accepts donations for charitable efforts as part of an official effort to discourage panhandling.

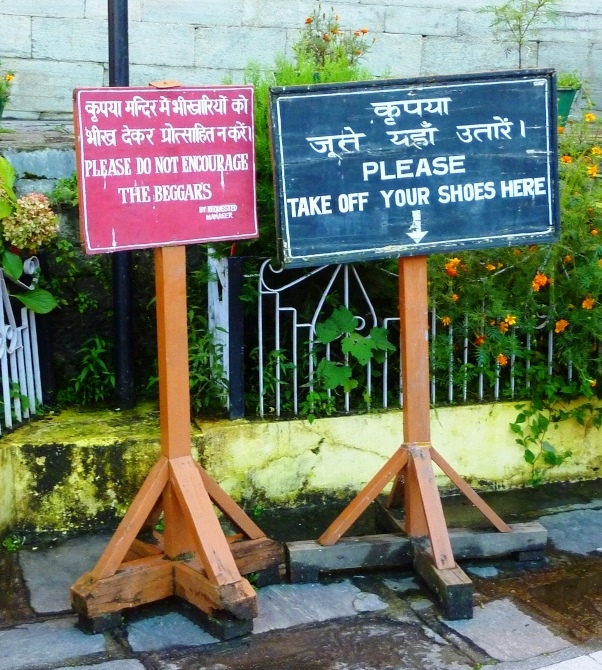
"Please do not encourage the beggars", Sarahan, India

Begging has been restricted or prohibited at various times and for various reasons, typically revolving around a desire to preserve public order or to induce people to work rather than to beg. Various European Poor Laws prohibited or regulated begging from the Renaissance to modern times, with varying levels of effectiveness and enforcement. Similar laws were adopted by many developing countries.

"Aggressive panhandling" has been specifically prohibited by law in various jurisdictions in the United States and Canada, typically defined as persistent or intimidating begging.

=== Afghanistan ===
Begging is banned in Afghanistan, which mostly exists in Kabul, Herat and Mazar-i-Sharif.

=== Australia ===
Each state and territory in Australia has specific laws regarding begging and panhandling. Begging for alms is illegal in Victoria, South Australia, Northern Territory, and Queensland.

=== Austria ===
There is no nationwide ban but it is illegal in several federal states.

=== Belarus ===
It is legal to beg in Belarus.

=== Belgium ===
Begging is legal in Belgium, but municipalities can restrict it.

=== Brazil ===
It is legal to beg in Brazil, where, beyond that, the SUS (pronounced SOOS, an acronym for Sistema Único de Saúde, meaning "Unified Health System"), the national state-funded universal healthcare system, is legally mandated to provide free healthcare also to beggars.

=== Bulgaria ===
Systematic begging is illegal in Bulgaria by article 329 of the penal code.

=== Canada ===
The province of Ontario introduced its Safe Streets Act in 1999 to restrict specific kinds of begging, particularly certain narrowly defined cases of "aggressive" or abusive begging. In 2001 this law was upheld under the Canadian Charter of Rights and Freedoms. The law was further upheld by the Court of Appeal for Ontario in January 2007.

One response to the anti-panhandling laws which were passed was the creation of the Ottawa Panhandlers Union which fights for the political rights of panhandlers. The union is a shop of the Industrial Workers of the World.

British Columbia enacted its own Safe Streets Act in 2004 which resembles the Ontario law. There are also critics in that province who oppose such laws.

=== Chile ===
Begging in Chile has been decriminalized since 1998. Nevertheless, municipal governments from time to time attempt to reintroduce begging bans as city ordinances.

=== China ===
Begging in China is illegal if:

- Coercing, decoying or utilizing others to beg;
- Forcing others to beg, repeatedly tangling or using other means of nuisance.

Those cases are violations of the Article 41 of the Public Security Administration Punishment Law of the People's Republic of China. For the first case, offenders would receive a detention between 10 days and 15 days, with an additional fine under RMB 1,000; for the second case, it is punishable by a 5-day detention or warning.

According to Article 262(2) or the Criminal Law of the People's Republic of China, organizing disabled or children under 14 to beg is illegal and will be punished by up to 7 years in prison, and fined.

=== Denmark ===
Historically beggars were controlled by the Stodderkonge or 'beggar king' for a town or district. Today, begging in Denmark is illegal under section 197 of the penal code, which reads:

Whoever, despite a police warning, makes himself guilty of begging, or who allows someone under 18, who belongs to his household, to beg, is to be punished with prison up to 6 months. If there are extenuating circumstances, the punishment may be omitted. A warning in the context of this law is valid for 5 years.

2) The requirement for a warning does not apply when the act was taken on a pedestrian street, by a station, in or by a supermarket or in public transportation.

3) When determining punishment, it should be considered an aggravating circumstance if the act was taken in one of the places mentioned in 2).

Furthermore, begging which causes insecurity in the streets (so-called utryghedsskabende tiggeri) has a harsher penalty of up to 14 days prison.

=== England and Wales ===
Begging is illegal under the Vagrancy Act 1824. However, it does not carry a jail sentence and is not enforced in many cities, although since the act applies in all public places, it is enforced more frequently on public transport. Local authorities may issue public spaces protection orders for particular areas, making begging subject to a fine.

=== Finland ===
Begging has been legal in Finland since 1987 when the poor law was invalidated. In 2003, the Public Order Act replaced local government rules and decriminalized begging.

=== France ===
A law against begging ended in 1994; however, begging with aggressive animals or children is still outlawed.

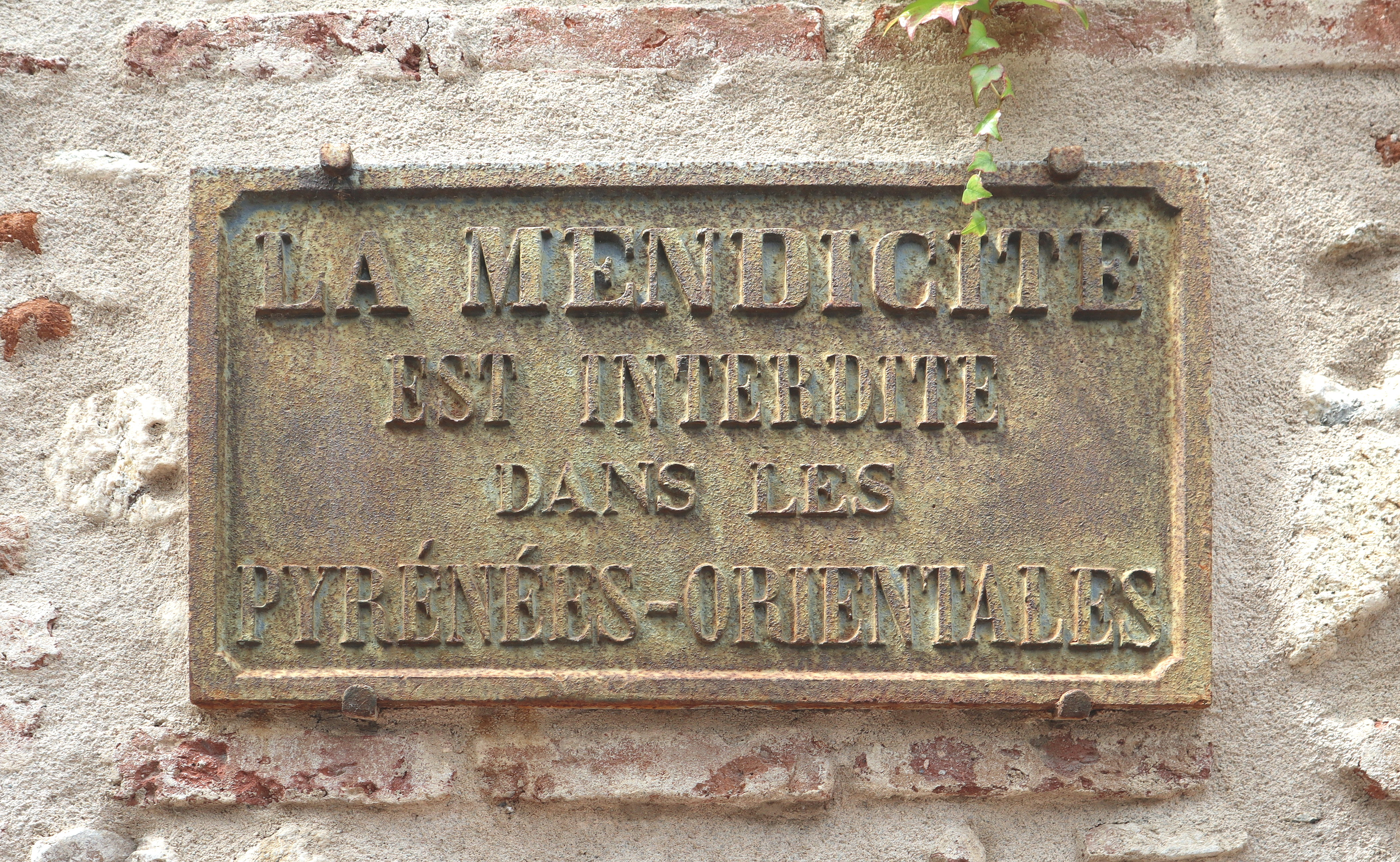
Historical plaque "Begging forbidden in the Pyrénées-Orientales" in Alénya, Département Pyrénées-Orientales, France.

=== Greece ===
Under article 407 of the Greek Penal Code, begging was punishable by up to 6 months in jail and up to a 3000 euro fine. However, this law was repealed in October 2018, after protests from street musicians in the city of Thessaloniki.

=== Hungary ===
Hungary has a nationwide ban. This may include stricter related laws in cities such as Budapest, which also prohibits picking things from rubbish bins.

=== India ===
Begging is criminalized in cities such as Mumbai and Delhi as per the Bombay Prevention of Begging Act, BPBA (1959). Under this law, officials of the Social Welfare Department, assisted by the police, conduct raids to pick up beggars who they then try in special courts called 'beggar courts'. If convicted, they are sent to certified institutions called 'beggar homes', also known as Sewa Kutir, for a period ranging from one to ten years for detention, training and employment. The government of Delhi, besides criminalizing alms-seeking, has also criminalized almsgiving at traffic signals, to reduce the 'nuisance' of begging and ensure the smooth flow of traffic.

Aashray Adhikar Abhiyan and the People's Union for Civil Liberties (PUCL) have criticized this Act and advocated its repeal. Section 2(1) of the BPBA broadly defines 'beggars' as those individuals who directly solicit alms, as well as those who have no visible means of subsistence and are found wandering around. Therefore, as a result of the enforcement of this law, the homeless are often mistaken for beggars. Beggar homes, which are meant to provide vocational training, have often been found to have abysmal living conditions.

In 2018, the Delhi High Court declared 25 provisions of the Bombay Prevention of Begging Act (1959) as unconstitutional, following petitions filed by Harsh Mander and Karnika Sawhney. In 2021, the Supreme Court refused to ban begging and observed that begging was a socioeconomic problem.

=== Ireland ===
"Passive" begging is legal in Ireland, but begging "in an aggressive, intimidating or threatening manner" is illegal, punishable by a fine. Gardaí (police) can also direct people begging in certain areas to move on, e.g. at an ATM, night safe, vending machine or shop entrance.

It is also illegal to "organise or direct someone else to beg;" under the Criminal Justice (Public Order) Act 2011, punishable by a €200,000 fine or up to 5 years in prison; this law was adopted in response to organised begging by Romani gangs.

Prior to the 2011, begging was outlawed by the Vagrancy (Ireland) Act 1847, adopted during the Great Famine, until a 2007 High Court ruling said that it was too vague and incompatible with the Constitution of Ireland's protection of freedom of speech.

=== Italy ===
Begging with children or animals is forbidden, but the law is not enforced.

=== Japan ===
Buddhist monks appear in public when begging for alms.

=== Latvia ===
Begging was made illegal in the historic city center of Riga in 2012. Begging in Riga outside the historic city center requires that the beggar carries ID.

=== Lithuania ===
It is illegal to beg in the capital Vilnius. It is also illegal to give money to a beggar. Both can receive a fine of up to 2,000 litas (€770).

=== Luxembourg ===
Begging in Luxembourg is legal, except when it is indulged in as a group or the beggar is a part of an organised effort. According to Chachipe, a Roma rights advocacy NGO, 1639 begging cases were reported by Luxembourgish law enforcement authorities. Roma beggars were arrested, handcuffed, taken to police stations and held for hours and had their money confiscated.

=== Nepal ===
Although the Begging (Prohibition) Act was introduced in 1962, this has not been enforced and the begging population in the capital, Kathmandu has since grown to over 5,000, according to police estimates. Besides the common begging tricks such as asking for money or asking for milk which will be returned to the shop for money, there is a unique scam in Nepal which involves asking a foreigner to buy a shoe box at an inflated price. This shoe box is claimed to help provide a sustainable livelihood for the beggar but in fact, will be returned to the seller for money.

=== Norway ===
Begging is banned in some counties and there were plans for a nationwide ban in 2015; however, this proposal was dropped after the Centre Party withdrew their support.

=== Philippines ===
Begging is prohibited in the Philippines under the Anti-Mendicancy Law of 1978 although this is not strictly enforced.

=== Poland ===
In Poland, it is illegal to beg under the Code of petty offences, if they are able to hold a job or beg in public in a pressing or fraudulently (Article 58). The beggar is due to a fine of €365. Who tends to beg a minor or helpless person or dependant relative depending on him or dedicated under his custody, shall be punishable by detention, restriction of liberty or a fine (Article 104).

=== Portugal ===
In Portugal, panhandlers normally beg in front of Catholic churches, at traffic lights or on special places in Lisbon or Porto downtowns. Begging is legal in Portugal. Many social and religious institutions support homeless people and panhandlers and the Portuguese Social Security normally gives them a survival monetary subsidy.

=== Qatar ===
Under the article 278 of the Qatari penal code, the maximum sentence for begging is one year. This sentence was increased from a maximum of three months before July 2006. The alternative is housing in a specialized correctional facility. The money will be confiscated in any case. This law is enforced, with a police division dedicated solely for that purpose.

=== Romania ===
Law 61 of 1991 forbids the persistent call for the mercy of the public, by a person who is able to work, although begging still remains widespread in the country.

US State Department Human Rights reports note a pattern of Roma children registered for "vagrancy and begging".

=== United States ===
In parts of San Francisco, California, aggressive panhandling is prohibited.

In May 2010, police in the city of Boston started cracking down on panhandling in the streets in downtown, and were conducting an educational outreach to residents advising them not to give to panhandlers. The Boston police distinguished active solicitation, or aggressive panhandling, versus passive panhandling of which an example is opening doors at a store with a cup in hand but saying nothing.

U. S. Courts have repeatedly ruled that begging is protected by the First Amendment's free speech provisions. On August 14, 2013, the U. S. Court of Appeals struck down a Grand Rapids, Michigan, anti-begging law on free speech grounds. An Arcata, California, law banning panhandling within twenty feet of stores was struck down on similar grounds in 2012.

In Baltimore, Maryland, several non-profits have been working with the "squeegee kids" to get them off the streets instead of the police having to enforce the law and have the teens arrested.

== Beggar characteristics ==
According to a 2025 study, begging appears to follow rational economic models. Economist who tracked hundreds of panhandlers at Metrorail stations in Washington, DC, found "consistent with a simple model of profit-maximizing panhandling... that panhandlers solicit more actively when they compete, when they have more human capital, and when passersby are more numerous and responsive to solicitation."

=== Use of funds ===
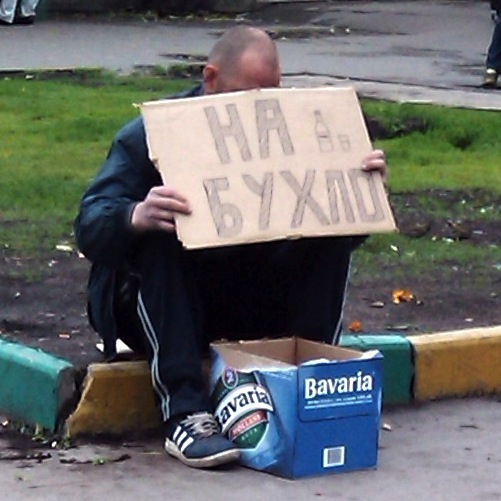
A man on the street of Moscow asks for money for alcoholic drinks.

A 2002 study of 54 panhandlers in Toronto reported that of a median monthly income of C$638 – those interviewed spent a median of $200 on food and $192 on alcohol, tobacco and illegal drugs. The Fraser Institute criticized this study, citing problems with potential exclusion of lucrative forms of begging and the unreliability of reports from the panhandlers who were polled in the study.

In North America, panhandling money is widely reported to support substance abuse and other addictions. For example, outreach workers in downtown Winnipeg, Manitoba, Canada, surveyed that city's panhandling community and determined that approximately three-quarters use some of the donated money to buy tobacco products, while two-thirds buy solvents or alcohol.

Because of concerns that people begging on the street may use the money to support alcohol or drug abuse, some advise those wishing to give to beggars to give gift cards or vouchers for food or services, and not cash. Some shelters also offer business cards with information on the shelter's location and services, which can be given in lieu of cash.

=== Forced begging ===
In the situation of forced begging, the beggar does not keep the money they collect, and is instead forced to hand it over to the person who is exploiting them. Forced begging can take several forms. In some cases, children are abducted from their families by organized criminal groups to be used for begging, and in other cases, their parents rent them out to be used as beggars, or their own parents force them to beg. Well-meaning donors who give money to the beggars are unaware that they are helping perpetuate a cycle of exploitation and that the beggars do not get to use the money they collect.

In 2016, police in India estimated that as many as 300,000 children were victims of forced begging at the hands of human traffickers. In extreme cases, the children are mutilated to make them appear more sympathetic to passerby and in turn more likely to give them money.

Organized crime groups that traffic children for begging sometimes target religious shrines as sites to use their victims as beggars. In other cases, teachers at religious schools force students to beg instead of charging them tuition.

While people who are forced to beg fail to bring in as much money as expected to satisfy their trafficker, they can be subject to violence and abuse. Prosecution of traffickers for forced begging is rare, and can often last years.

== In fine art ==
There are many depictions of beggars in fine art.

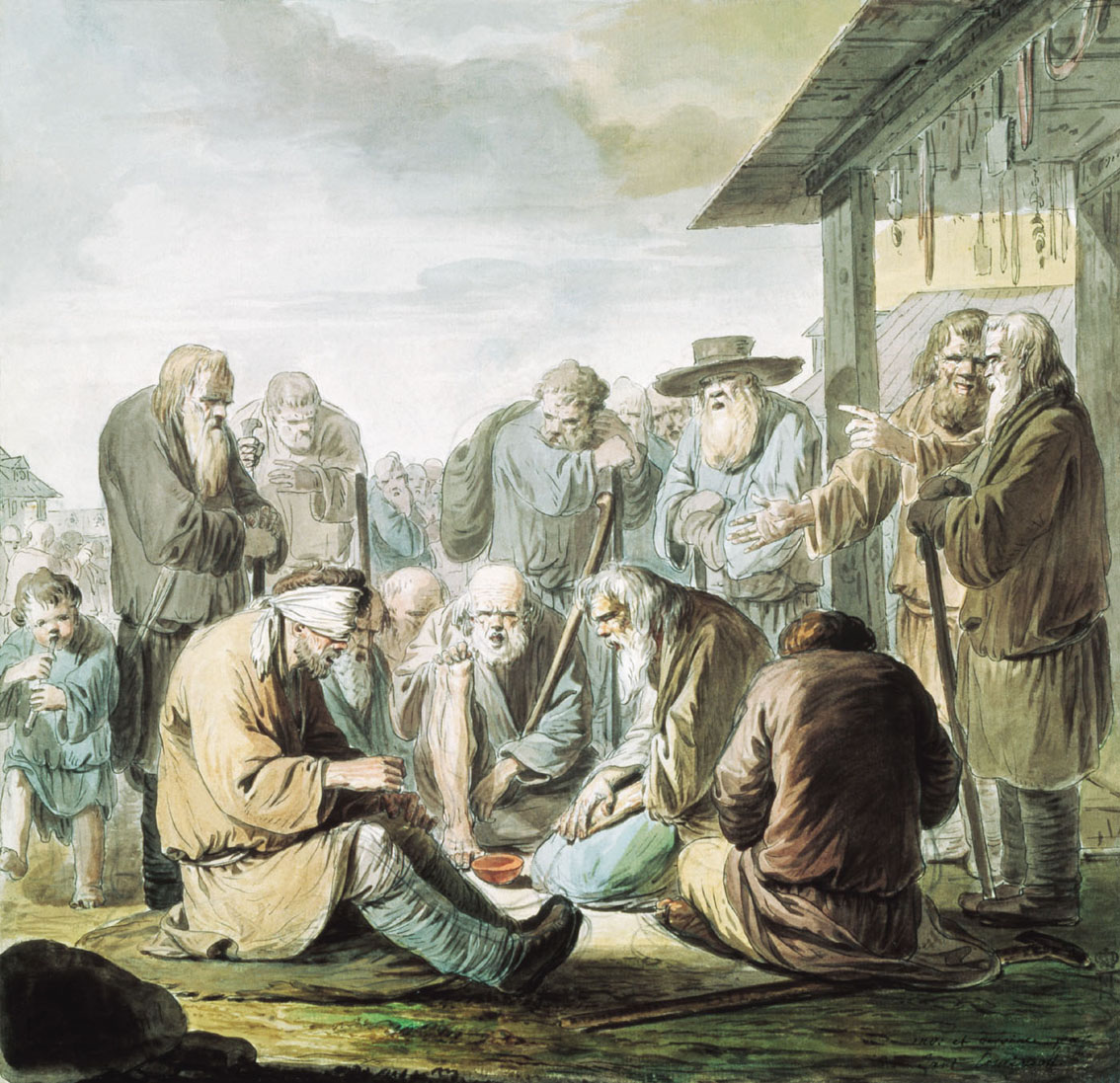
The Singing Beggars by Russian painter Ivan Yermenyov c. 1775

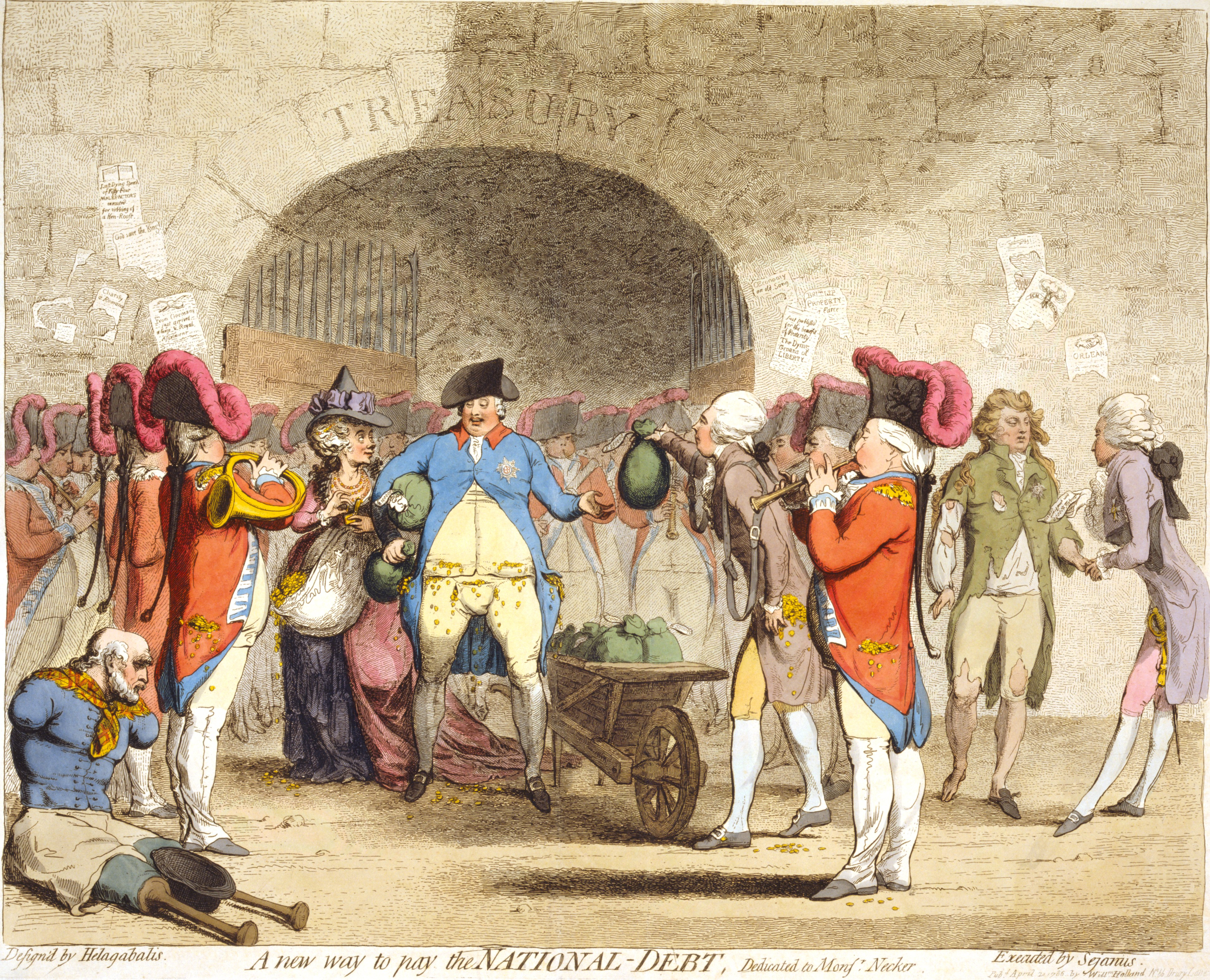
In a 1786 James Gillray caricature, the plentiful money bags handed to King George III are contrasted with the beggar whose legs and arms were amputated, in the left corner.

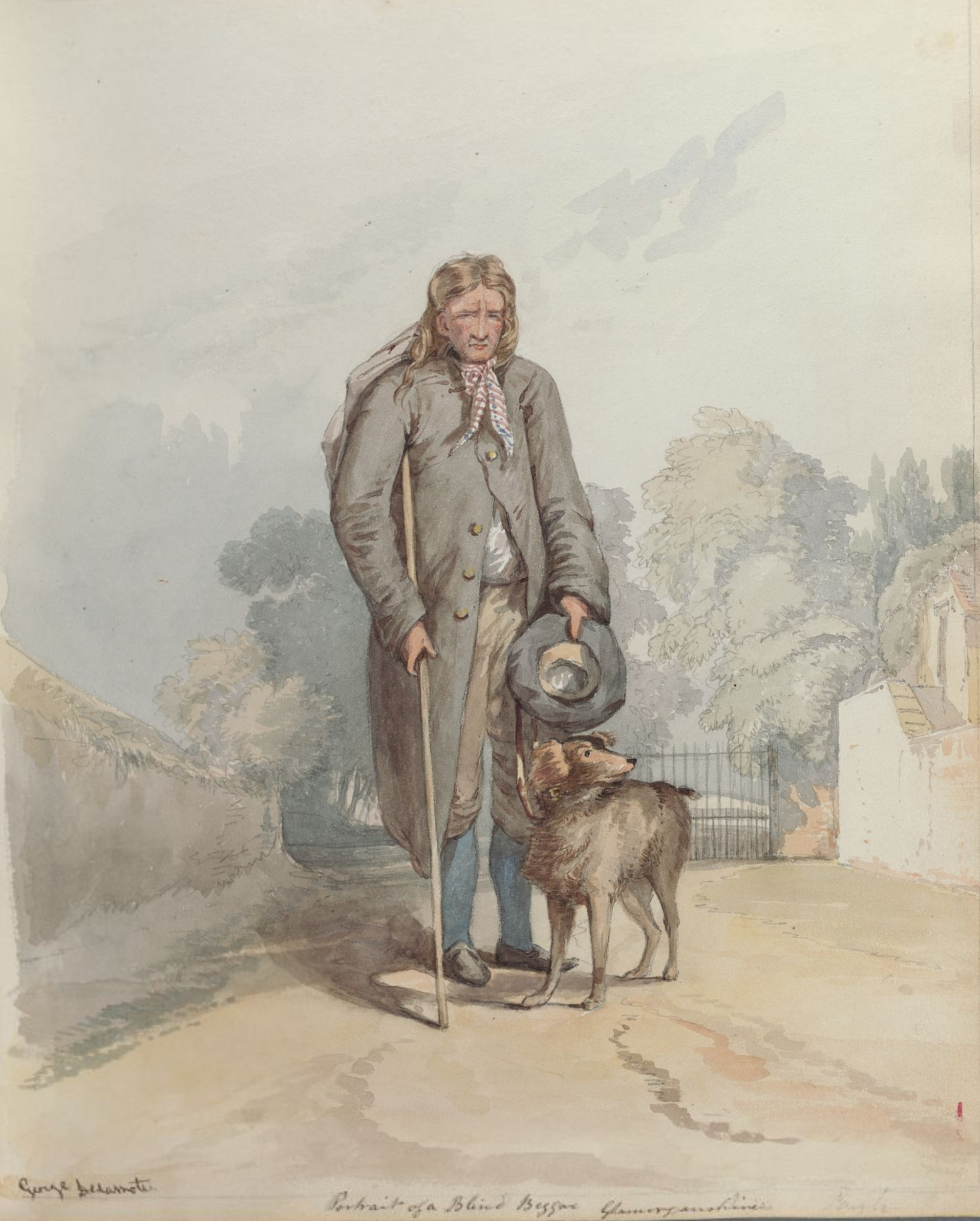
Portrait of a Blind Beggar, Glamorganshire, George Orleans Delamotte, 1818

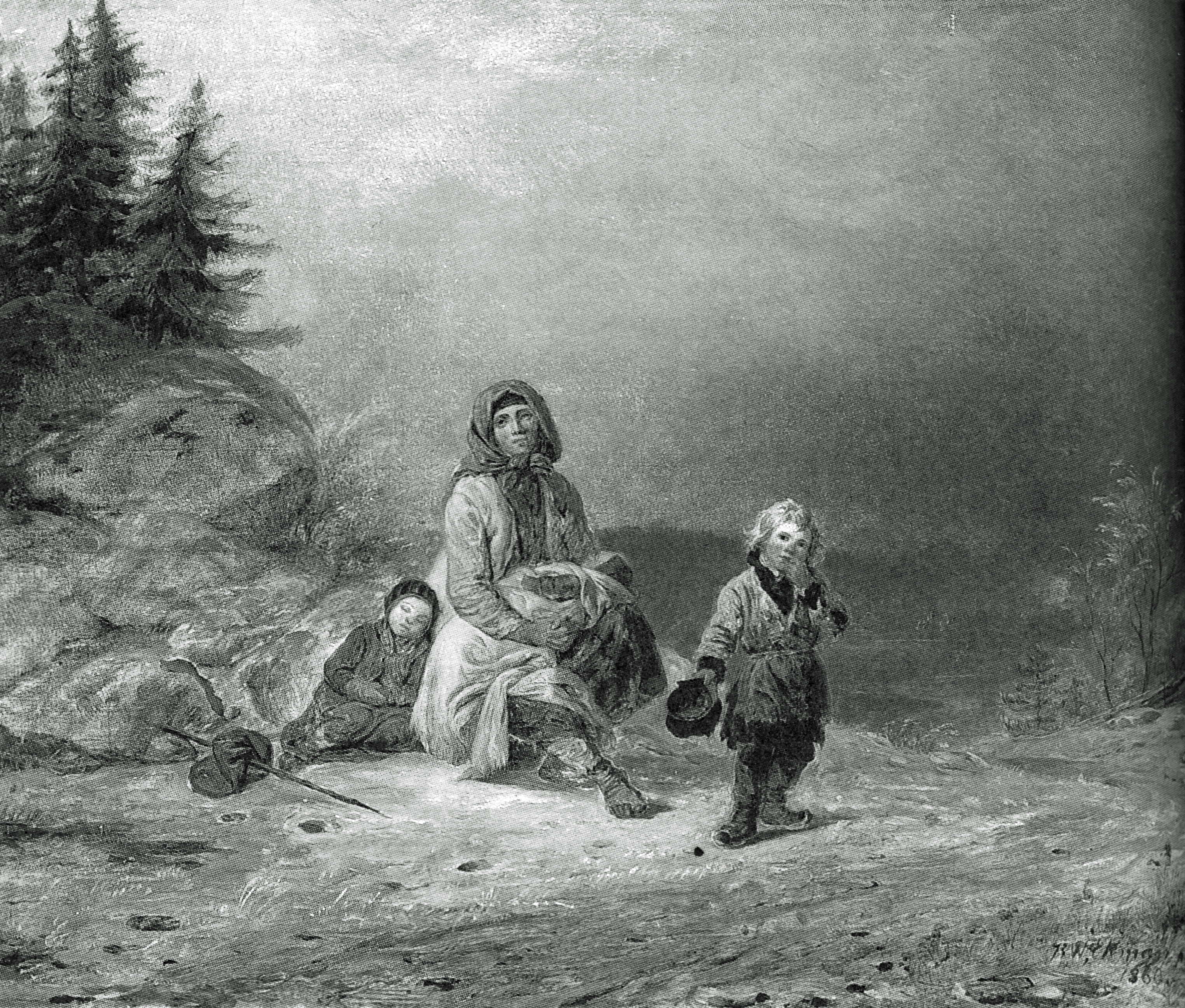
Beggar family at the road, by Robert Wilhelm Ekman, 1860

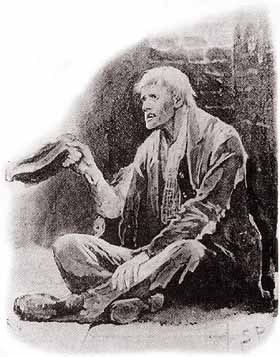
"The Man with the Twisted Lip", illustrated by Sidney Paget 1891, a beggar playing a major role in a Sherlock Holmes adventure

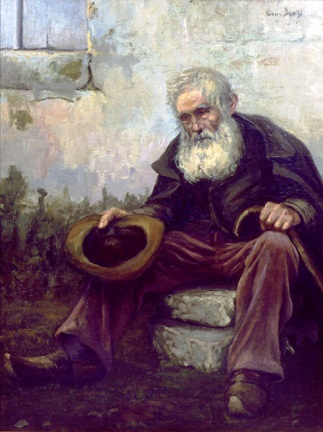
Louis Dewis, "The Old Beggar", Bordeaux, France, 1916

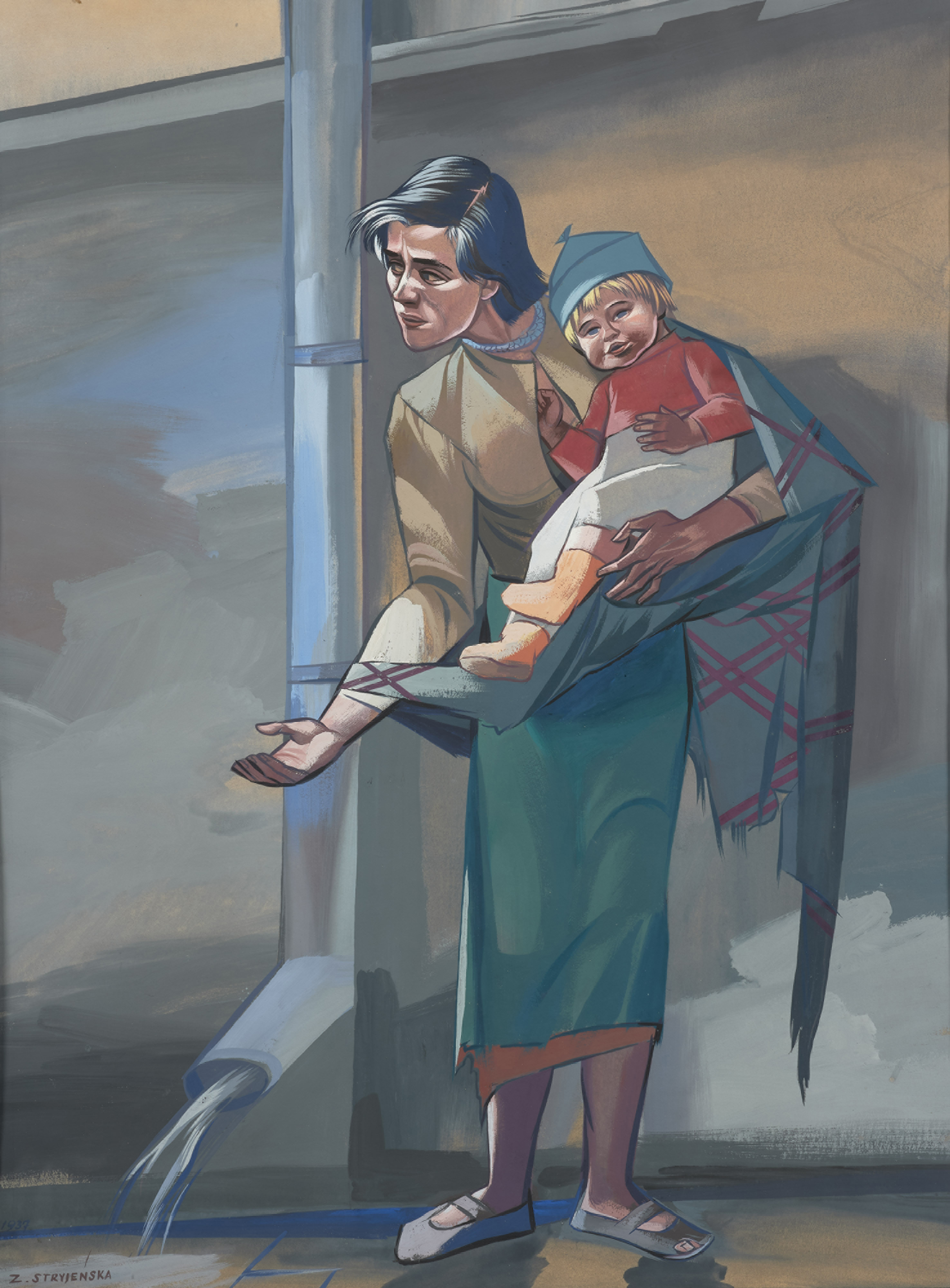
Beggar with Child, by Zofia Stryjeńska, 1937

== Notable beggars ==
- Gautama Buddha, the founder of Buddhism, accepted alms from people to survive
- Bampfylde Moore Carew, the self-styled "King of the Beggars"
- Qiao Feng, a fictional character in Jin Yong's wuxia Demi-Gods and Semi-Devils
- Hong Qigong, a fictional character in Jin Yong's wuxia Legend of the Condor Heroes
- So Chan, a Chinese folk hero of Drunken Fist
- Diogenes of Sinope, a Greek philosopher
- Dobri Dobrev, a Bulgarian ascetic and philanthropist
- Gallicina, the mendicant Darotti is accused of murdering in Susan Palwick's novel, The Necessary Beggar (2005)
- Nicholas Jennings, characterized as a rogue, in Thomas Harman's A Caveat for Common Cursitors
- Lazarus, a Biblical character described in the Gospel of Luke, in the parable of the rich man and Lazarus (also called the Dives and Lazarus or Lazarus and Dives)
- "The Man with the Twisted Lip", the titular character of Sir Arthur Conan Doyle's eponymous Sherlock Holmes short story
- Gavroche Thenardier, a fictional character in Victor Hugo's novel Les Misérables
- Wu Xun, was a Chinese wandering beggar and educational reformer
- Zhu Yuanzhang, the founder of the Ming Dynasty

== See also ==
- Begging behavior in animals
- Begging letter
- Belisarius
- Busking
- Child Begging
- Fundraising
- Garbage picking
- Mendicant Orders
- Street fundraising
