= Shelter (Palwick novel) =

Shelter is a 2007 science fiction novel by Susan Palwick. It was first published by Tor Books.

== Synopsis ==
Shelter follows three characters — Meredith Walford, Roberta Danton, and an artificial intelligence called "House" — through a twenty-year interval as the world is affected by climate change, mind uploading, pandemic-induced depopulation, and the pathologizing of altruism.

== Reception ==
Publishers Weekly called the book "inflated" and "sprawling", with "stereotypical" characters and a plot that "sputters and fizzles".

Jo Walton lauded it as "a shining example of what science fiction can be when it tries" and "very well worth [a reader's] attention", with "solidly drawn characters" and a "world [that] feels very real"; however, she faulted the novel for depicting Gaianism as having replaced Christianity as the dominant religion in the United States, which she found "weird and unconvincing".

Conversely, James Nicoll stated that he "didn't even like" the novel, despite praising Palwick's skill as a writer, and being intrigued by the concept of an America where "excessive altruism is considered the sort of medical condition that justifies involuntary treatment". Nicoll particularly criticized Palwick's description of a post-pandemic Africa as a "ghost continent". As well, he felt that, given the number of characters who are substantially worse off for having interacted with Meredith, the world may have been a better place had she not survived the pandemic; he did, however, concede that Meredith "actually understands and feels quite guilty about the fact that she has badly hurt a lot of people."
