= Ivan Yermenyov =

Russian painter

- Born: 1767; Saint Petersburg, Russian Empire
- Died: c. 1797
- Known for: Painting
- Notable work: Beggars
- Patrons: Paul I of Russia

Ivan Alexeyevich Yermenyov (Russian: Иван Алексеевич Ерменёв; 1746–1797?) was a Russian painter.

== Biography ==
Ivan Yermenyov was born in 1746 within the city of St. Petersburg, which was then part of the Russian Empire. He was the son of a court groom, and was playmates with the then Grand Duke Paul.

In 1767 he graduated from the Imperial Academy of Arts. However, he did not receive a diploma, only the lowest certificate of the 4th degree. During his time at the academy, he studied in architectural classes under Jean-Baptiste Vallin de la Mothe and Alexander Kokorinov, and painting classes under Stefano Torelli. In 1774, he was sponsored by the Grand Duke Paul, and was sent to the Kingdom of France to see the techniques of art there at the end of 1774.

His date of death is uncertain, but believed to be sometime after 1797.

== Works ==
The most notable work of the artist is a series of eight watercolors known as "Beggars".

== Gallery ==
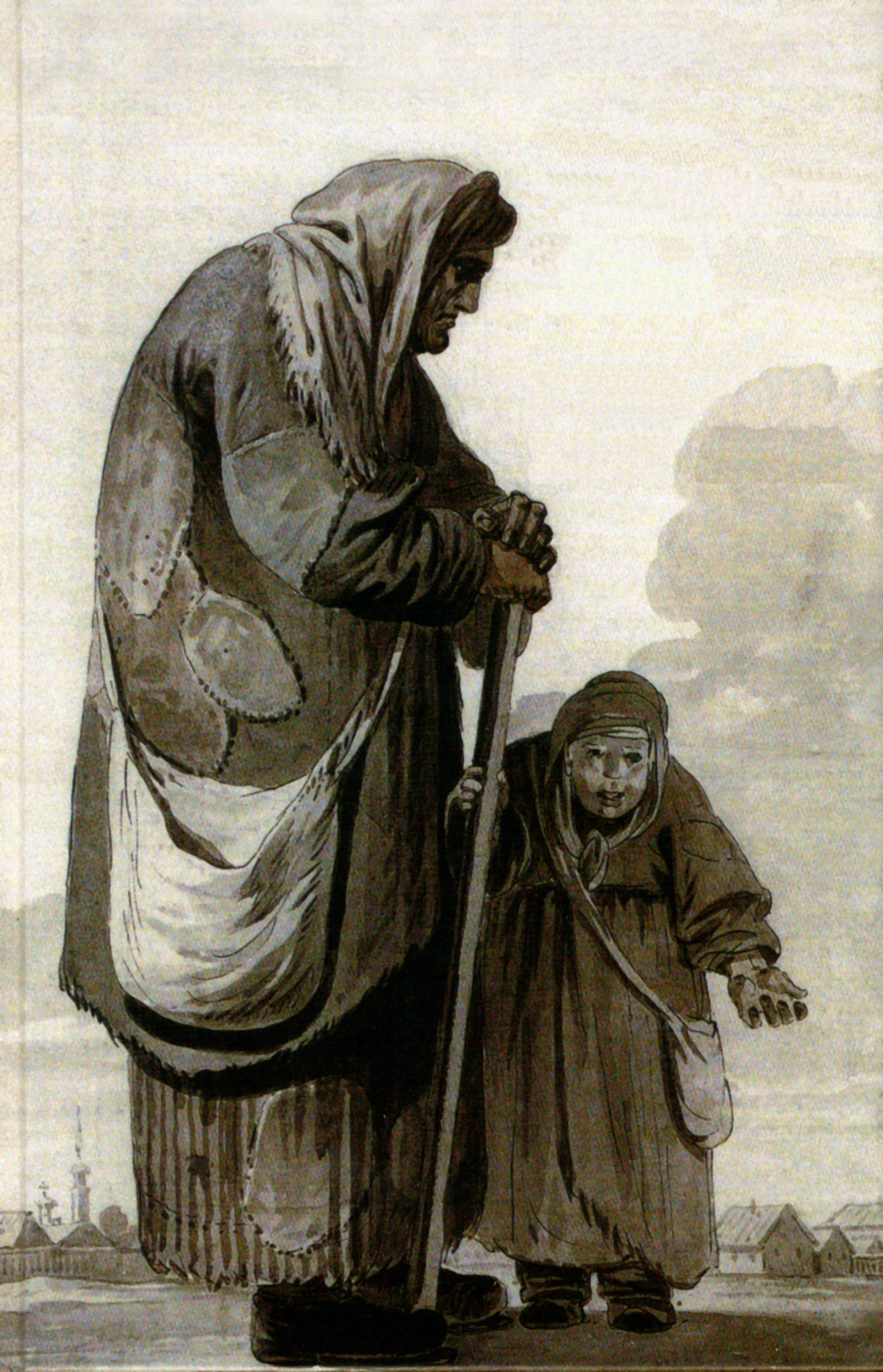

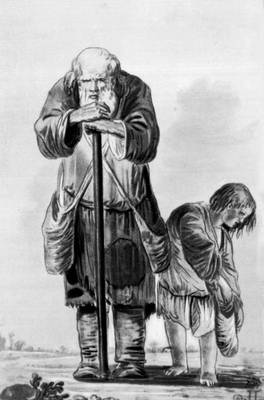

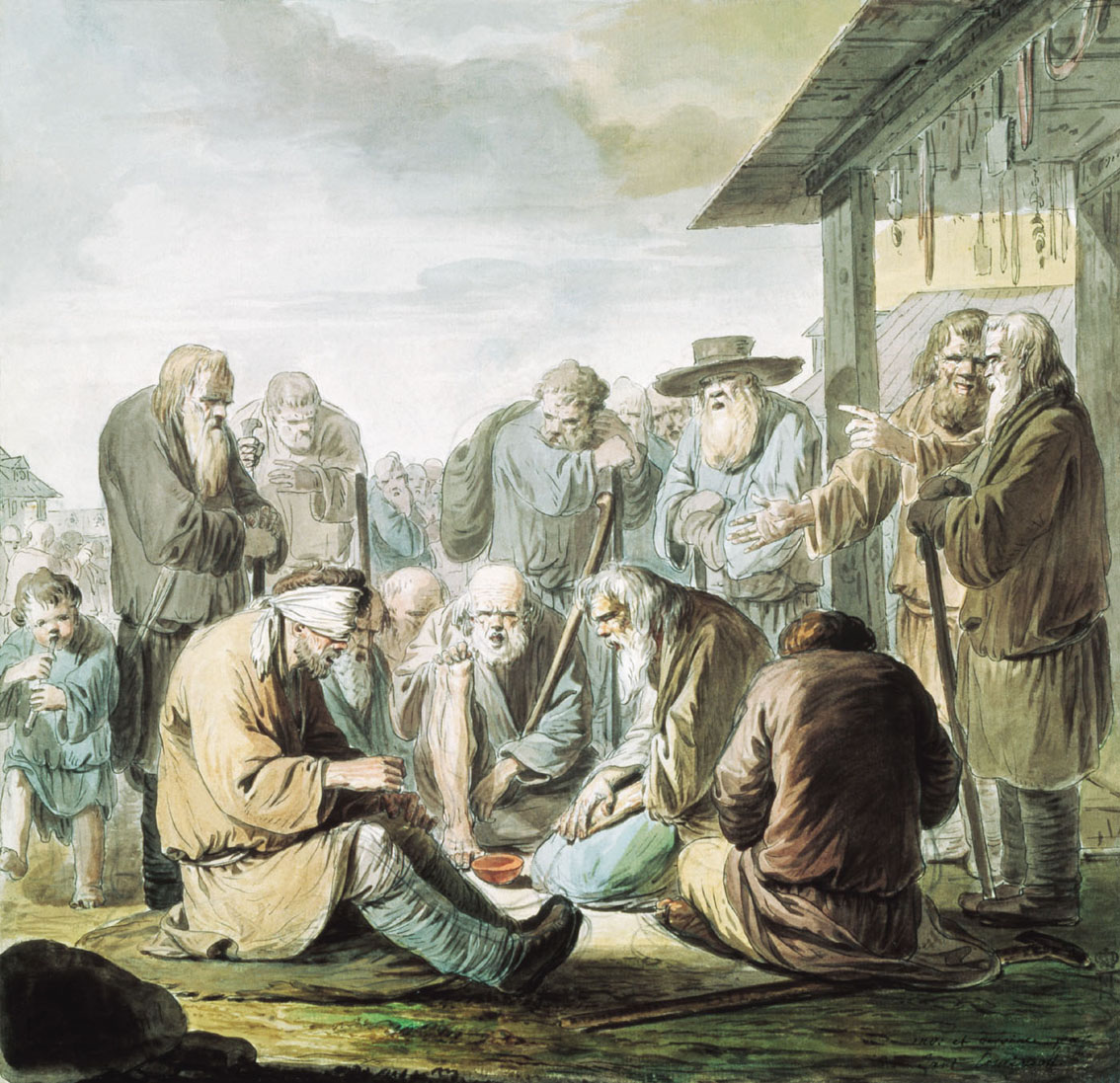
