= Stodderkonge =

"Beggar king", an official supervising beggars

A Stodderkonge ("beggar king" or "vagrant king") was an official in Denmark and Norway during the 16th to 19th centuries who was appointed to supervise the beggars within a town or city quarter. Only beggars with begging permits were allowed to beg and it was the Stodderkonge's responsibility to ensure that those without a permit were chased out of town or placed to work in the prison.

These 'beggar kings' were sometimes unpopular, as beggars were considered to be scroungers. In addition, there were examples of beggar kings who, together with the strongest of the beggars in one area, formed a band that kept other beggars out. The beggars in the band paid the beggar king their income in return for not being expelled.

The duties of the beggar king were later transferred to the police department itself, and the special function of the beggar king lapsed in most places from the late 18th century onwards.

In recent times, the word has taken on a new meaning, in that among the Danish vagabonds each year, a beggar king is chosen in connection with the Egeskov Market. One of the duties of the beggar king is to enact justice among the vagabonds and settle disputes.
