= The Necessary Beggar =

2005 novel by Susan Palwick

- Author: Susan Palwick
- Cover artist: Stephan Martiniere
- Language: English
- Genre: Science fiction, Speculative fiction
- Publisher: Tor Books
- Publication date: October 1, 2005
- Publication place: United States
- Pages: 320 pages
- ISBN: 978-0765310972

The Necessary Beggar is an adult science fiction novel written by Susan Palwick. Published on October 1, 2005, by Tor Books, it is the author's second novel. The book received the Alex Award in 2006 and was nominated for the Mythopoeic Fantasy Award in 2007.

== Plot ==
The Necessary Beggar tells the story of alleged murderer Darroti and his family after he is exiled from the city of Lémabantunk in Gandiffri, a paradisaical land built on the central idea of community. Murder is the sole unforgivable crime in this world, and as Darroti is accused of murdering a mendicant (a holy beggar), his crimes are considered particularly egregious. Darroti's family follows him through the glowing doorway that leads to the randomly selected realm of his exile. They emerge at the entrance of an American refugee camp. Unable to speak the language or explain their origins, the family is prohibited from being officially admitted into the country but impossible to deport. The situation is made worse by the heightened xenophobia present in this year 2022 version of America.

Faced with the guilt of his family's exile, Darroti commits suicide to relieve his loved ones of his burden. Rather than be reincarnated in a new form as he would have been in his homeland, he becomes a ghost. To his dismay, his death throws his father into depression and embitters his other family members. He attempts to provide explanation by entering his father's dreams, but his communications are interpreted as nightmares.

Lisa and Stan, camp volunteers and evangelists, help the family adapt to the new culture. Zamatryna, one of Darroti's nieces, is the quickest to adapt thanks to her high intelligence. When a bomb planted by an anti-immigration group explodes in the camp, Lisa helps the family escape under the guise of death. She allows them to live in the home inherited from her mother with the loose promise of payback at a later date.

Zamatryna continues to flourish in school, convinced that education is the only way to make her family's life easier, while the adults acquire work. She meets a boy named Jerry who slowly convinces her to consider her own desires and open up to those who wish to know her. The final push is made by Darroti when he manipulates the dreams of the more susceptible Jerry. Through Jerry, the family discovers that Darroti didn't murder the mendicant; she was in fact his lover, and under the impression that Darroti had been unfaithful, killed herself. With the truth now known, Darroti's spirit is returned to Lémabantunk. Zama and Jerry marry so that she may gain citizenship and sponsor her family.

== Characters ==
- Darroti - Timbor's youngest child. Restless and impulsive, he was never quite as comfortable with life in Lémabantunk as the other members of the family. His displeasure with his place in life was expressed by excessive spending and alcoholism. It is when he locks himself in a friend's apartment to detox for his lover that she misinterprets his act of love as infidelity.
- Zamatryna - Eroloit and Harani's daughter. She arrives in the United States as a child and is unable to recall much of Lémabantunk. In addition to being highly intelligent, she assimilates to the new culture with the most ease. This results in the burden of the family's future being placed on her shoulders. Zama also carries a beetle into the U.S. which continually traces an X, the symbol of silence in Lémabantunk, which causes her to hide its existence. This beetle is the "murdered" mendicant in her reincarnated form.
- Timbor - the family's patriarch and the father of Eroloit, Darroti, and Macsofo. Their mother, Frella, died before the events of the story took place. In his move from Lémabantunk to America, Timbor transitions from carpet merchant to taxi driver. He is the only character to form a bond with Stan.
- Macsofo - the family member who harbors the most resentment towards Darroti and the situation that his alleged crime has put them in. He becomes short-tempered and verbally abusive to the point that his wife leaves the family home and takes the children with her.
- Gallicina - the mendicant Darroti is accused of murdering. It is unusual that she decides to become a mendicant, because it's normally a rite of passage reserved for men. In addition to being part of a protected class as a mendicant, she comes from a prestigious family which makes for a large class discrepancy between her and Darroti.
- Lisa's - Stan's wife. Her main occupation is helping Stan to grow the congregation of the small church that he operates from home. She is respectful of the family's culture and makes no overt attempts at converting them to Christianity. She served time in prison long ago.
- Stan - the pastor of a small, struggling church. He makes a concentrated effort to convert the family and considers the expression of their religion to be blasphemous. His portrayal of Christianity frightens the family making his efforts unsuccessful.

== Reception ==
Publishers Weekly called the novel "a sharp meditation on refugees and displaced persons and a tragicomedy of cultural differences."
