= Susan Palwick =

American writer and professor emerita of English

- Palwick at Wiscon 30 (2006)
- Born: 1960 (age 65–66); New York City, U.S.
- Education: Princeton University; Yale University
- Occupation: Writer
- Writing career
- Notable awards: Crawford Award (1993); Alex Award (2006)

Susan Palwick (born 1960 in New York City) is an American writer and associate professor emerita of English at the University of Nevada, Reno. She began her professional career by publishing "The Woman Who Saved the World" for Isaac Asimov's Science Fiction Magazine in 1985.

Raised in northern New Jersey, Palwick attended Princeton University, where she studied fiction writing with novelist Stephen Koch, and she holds a doctoral degree from Yale. In the 1980s, she was an editor of The Little Magazine and then helped found The New York Review of Science Fiction, to which she contributed several reviews and essays. Although she is not a prolific author, Palwick's work has received multiple awards, including the Rhysling Award (in 1986) for her poem "The Neighbor's Wife". She won the Crawford Award for best first novel with Flying in Place in 1993, and the Alex Award in 2006 for her second novel, The Necessary Beggar. Her third novel, Shelter, was published by Tor in 2007. Another book, The Fate of Mice (a collection of short stories), has also been published by Tachyon Publications.

Susan Palwick is a practicing Episcopalian and lay preacher. For many years, she wrote a column for the Church Health Center's website on faith and health, HopeandHealing.org. As of 2019, she worked as a hospital chaplain in Reno.

== Awards ==
| Year | Nominee | Award | | Result | Ref |
|---|---|---|---|---|---|
| 1986 | "The Neighbor's Wife" | Rhysling Award | Short Poem | Won | |
| 1987 | "Elephant | Theodore Sturgeon Award | — | Shortlisted | |
| 1993 | Flying in Place | Crawford Award | — | Won | |
| 1993 | Flying in Place | John W. Campbell Award Award | — | Honorable Mention | |
| 1993 | Flying in Place | Locus Award | First Novel | Nominated | |
| 1993 | Flying in Place | Locus Award | Fantasy Novel | Nominated | |
| 2006 | The Necessary Beggar | Alex Award | — | Won | |
| 2007 | The Necessary Beggar | Mythopoeic Award | Adult Literature | Shortlisted | |
| 2015 | "Windows" | Asimov's Readers' Poll | Short Story | Shortlisted | |
| 2020 | All Worlds Are Real | Philip K. Dick Award | — | Shortlisted | |
| 2023 | "Sparrows" | Asimov's Readers' Poll | Short Story | Shortlisted | |

== Bibliography ==
=== Novels ===
- —— (1992). Flying in Place (hardcover ed.). Tor Books. pp. 1–179. ISBN 9780312851835.
- —— (2005). The Necessary Beggar (hardcover ed.). Tor Books. pp. 1–320. ISBN 9780765310972.
- —— (2007). Shelter (paperback ed.). Tor Books. pp. 1–576. ISBN 9780312866020.
- —— (2013). Mending the Moon (hardcover ed.). Tor Books. pp. 1–336. ISBN 9780765327581.

=== Collections ===
- —— (2007). The Fate of Mice (paperback ed.). Tachyon Publications. pp. 1–218. ISBN 9781892391421.
- —— (2019). All Worlds Are Real (paperback ed.). Fairwood Press LLC. pp. 1–322. ISBN 9781933846842.

=== Short fiction ===
| Year | Title | First published | Notes |
|---|---|---|---|
| 1985 | "The Woman Who Saved the World" | —— (May 1985). "The Woman Who Saved the World". Asimov's Science Fiction. | |
| 1996 | "GI Jesus" | —— (1996). Hayden, Patrick Nielsen (ed.). "GI Jesus". Starlight (1). | |
| 1997 | "Aïda in the Park" | —— (April 1997). Kushner, Ellen; Sherman, Delia; Keller, Donald G. (eds.). "Aïda in the Park". The Horns of Elfland. Roc Books. | |
| 2000 | "Wood and Water" | —— (February 2000). "Wood and Water". F&SF. | |
| 2000 | "Going After Bobo" | —— (May 2000). "Going After Bobo". Asimov's Science Fiction (May 2000). | |
| 2001 | "Gestella" | —— (2001). "Gestella". Starlight (3). | |
| 2013 | "Homecoming" | —— (July 10, 2013). Datlow, Ellen (ed.). "Homecoming". Tor.com. | |
| 2013 | "Hhasalin" | —— (September–October 2003). "Hhasalin". F&SF. | |
| 2014 | "Windows" | —— (September 2014). "Windows". Asimov's Science Fiction. 38 (9): 73–77. | |
| 2018 | "Recoveries" | —— (June 20, 2018). Datlow, Ellen (ed.). "Recoveries". Tor.com. | |
| 2022 | "The Long View" | —— (April 27, 2022). Datlow, Ellen (ed.). "The Long View". Tor.com. | |

=== Poetry Collections ===
- —— (2012). Brief Visits: Sonnets from a Volunteer Chaplain (paperback 1st ed.). Huntsville: Texas Review Press. ISBN 9781933896885.
