= 1991 Ottawa municipal election =

Election in Ontario, Canada

1991 Ottawa mayoral election
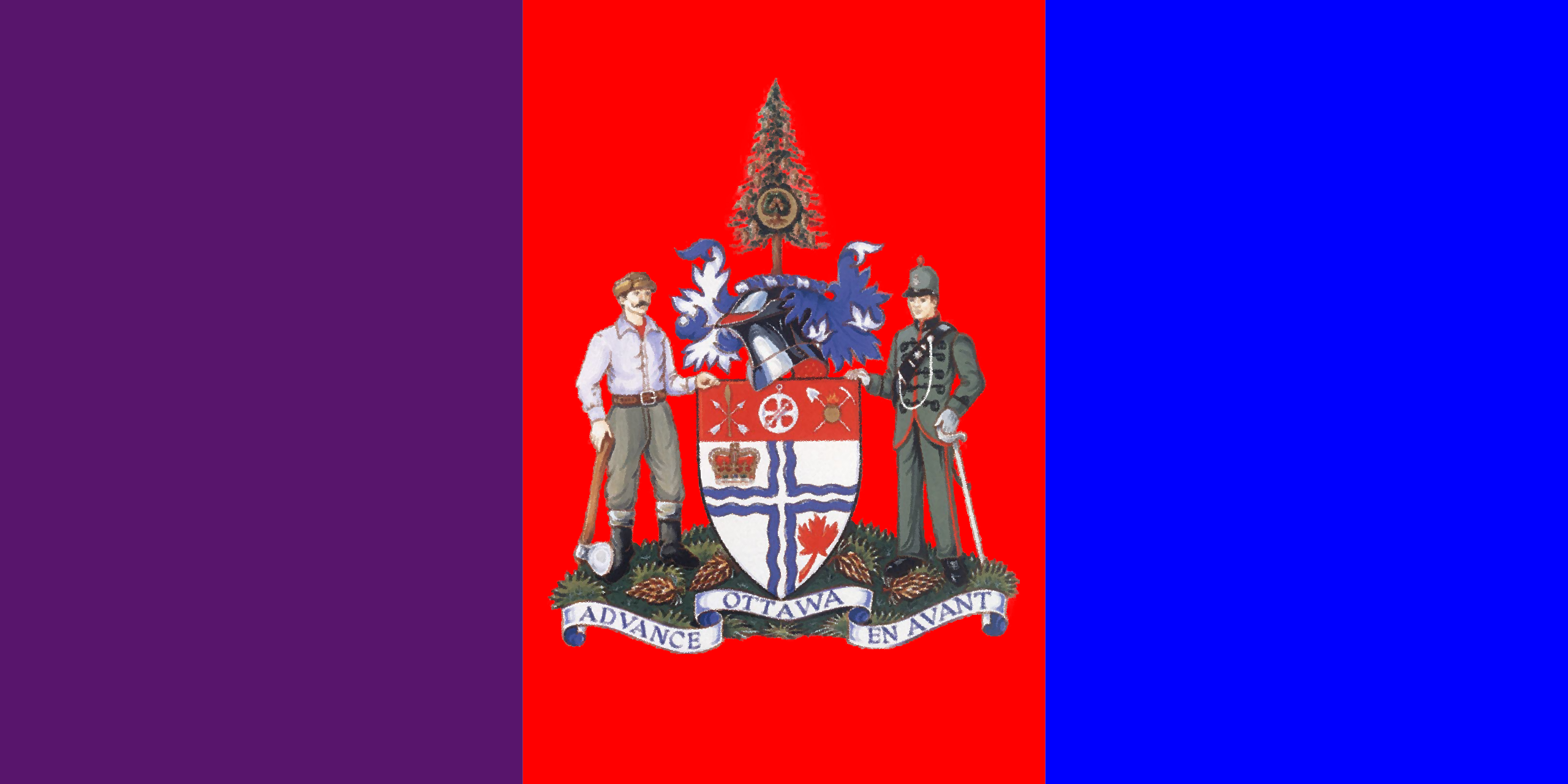
- November 12, 1991
| Candidate | Jacquelin Holzman | Nancy Smith | Marc Laviolette |
| Popular vote | 38,725 | 35,525 | 21,101 |
| Percentage | 39.61% | 36.34% | 21.58% |
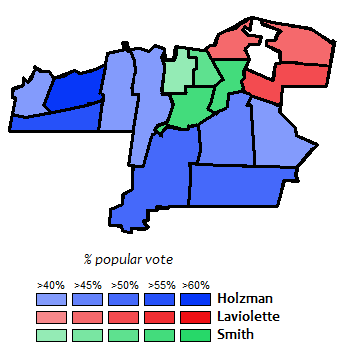
- Results by ward
Mayor before election
Marc Laviolette
Elected mayor
Jacquelin Holzman

The city of Ottawa, Canada held municipal elections on November 12, 1991.

Right wing Britannia Ward councillor Jacquelin Holzman defeated left wing St. George's councillor Nancy Smith and mayor Marc Laviolette. Holzman defeated Smith by just 3,022 votes. She ran on a platform to "keep a lid on city taxes".

Despite the eventual closeness of the result, and the polarization of the candidates, pundits lamented that the electorate was not interested in the election, as the candidates had not inspired the voters who were more concerned with "national issues like the constitution and the economy".

After the election, Liberal MP Mac Harb (who supported Holzman) admitted to "quietly encourag[ing]" Laviolette to enter the race to split the vote, because he "couldn't stomach (the thought of) Smith's left wing social agenda" winning.

== Mayor ==
| Candidate | Votes | % |
|---|---|---|
| Jacquelin Holzman | 38,725 | 39.61 |
| Nancy Smith | 35,525 | 36.34 |
| Marc Laviolette (X) | 21,101 | 21.58 |
| Michael Bartholomew | 2,417 | 2.47 |

=== Results by ward ===
Holzman's victory was propelled by winning the city's suburban wards, with her best ward being Richmond, which she had represented on council. Smith won the city's four urban wards, doing her best in St. George's, which she had represented on council. Laviolette won the city's two Francophone-influenced eastern wards.

| Ward | Bartholomew | Holzman | Laviolette | Smith |
| By-Rideau (1) | 145 | 1,558 | 3,731 | 2,763 |
| St. George's (2) | 102 | 1,367 | 1,036 | 3,401 |
| Overbrook-Forbes (3) | 156 | 1,076 | 2,736 | 1,425 |
| Wellington (4) | 109 | 1,292 | 758 | 2,431 |
| Capital (5) | 268 | 2,235 | 611 | 3,934 |
| Dalhousie (6) | 235 | 1,810 | 1,201 | 2,329 |
| Elmdale (7) | 143 | 2,906 | 1,339 | 2,835 |
| Carlington-Westboro (Queensboro) (8) | 180 | 2,519 | 1,276 | 2,159 |
| Richmond (9) | 119 | 5,469 | 787 | 2,433 |
| Britannia (10) | 175 | 2,411 | 1,023 | 2,054 |
| Carleton (11) | 170 | 3,574 | 910 | 1,836 |
| Canterbury (12) | 175 | 2,894 | 2,022 | 1,973 |
| Alta Vista (13) | 181 | 3,860 | 1,664 | 2,835 |
| Billings (14) | 112 | 2,432 | 1,002 | 1,136 |
| River (15) | 147 | 3,322 | 1,005 | 1,981 |

== City council ==
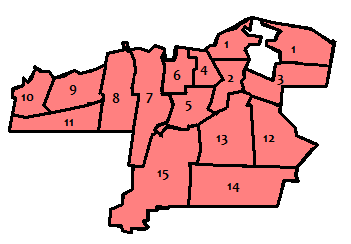
Map of Ottawa's Wards used in this election: 1. By-Rideau Ward; 2. St. George's Ward; 3. Overbrook-Forbes Ward; 4. Wellington Ward; 5. Capital Ward; 6. Dalhousie Ward; 7. Elmdale Ward; 8. Carlington-Westboro Ward; 9. Richmond Ward; 10. Britannia Ward; 11. Carleton Ward; 12. Canterbury Ward; 13. Alta Vista Ward; 14. Billings Ward; 15. Riverside Ward.

Alta Vista Ward
| Candidate | Votes | % |
|---|---|---|
| Peter Hume | 4,660 | 55.80 |
| Stephen Amesse | 2,827 | 33.85 |
| Rebecca Liff | 865 | 10.36 |

Billings Ward
| Candidate | Votes | % |
|---|---|---|
| Joan O'Neill (X) | Acclaimed | |

Britannia Ward
| Candidate | Votes | % |
|---|---|---|
| Jill Brown | 1,859 | 33.13 |
| Gregory Ross | 1,558 | 27.77 |
| Geoffrey Sharpe | 831 | 14.81 |
| Jim Jones (X) | 665 | 11.85 |
| Clarence S. Dungey | 273 | 4.87 |
| Randy McCooeye | 214 | 3.81 |
| Andy Sammon | 211 | 3.76 |

By-Rideau Ward
| Candidate | Votes | % |
|---|---|---|
| Richard Cannings | 3,657 | 45.41 |
| Pierre Bourque (X) | 2,461 | 30.56 |
| Maurice Pagé | 1,717 | 21.32 |
| Richard Beaudry | 218 | 2.71 |

Capital Ward
| Candidate | Votes | % |
|---|---|---|
| Jim Watson | 4,123 | 58.40 |
| Lynn Smyth (X) | 1,817 | 25.74 |
| Michael Lynch | 638 | 9.04 |
| Frank De Jong | 482 | 6.83 |

Canterbury Ward
| Candidate | Votes | % |
|---|---|---|
| Jack MacKinnon | 1,530 | 22.37 |
| Ed Concordia | 1,435 | 20.98 |
| Mireille Landry-Kennedy | 1,132 | 16.55 |
| Ernie Lauzon | 1,041 | 15.22 |
| Douglas Sears | 943 | 13.78 |
| Carl Langroix | 340 | 4.97 |
| Elaine Lindsay | 288 | 4.21 |
| Garry J. Fischer | 132 | 1.93 |

Carleton Ward
| Candidate | Votes | % |
|---|---|---|
| Tim Kehoe (X) | 3,442 | 54.93 |
| Jim Bonner | 2,824 | 45.07 |

Carlington-Westboro Ward
| Candidate | Votes | % |
|---|---|---|
| Mark Maloney (X) | 5,011 | 81.85 |
| Lynda Flowers | 1,111 | 18.15 |

Dalhousie Ward
| Candidate | Votes | % |
|---|---|---|
| Peter Harris | 2,807 | 48.89 |
| Elisabeth Arnold | 2,602 | 45.32 |
| Andy Haydon, Jr. | 333 | 5.80 |

Elmdale Ward
| Candidate | Votes | % |
|---|---|---|
| Joan Wong | 3,383 | 47.60 |
| Jamie Fisher (X) | 3,194 | 44.94 |
| Steve Rimek | 530 | 7.46 |

Overbrook-Forbes Ward
| Candidate | Votes | % |
|---|---|---|
| Jacques Legendre | 1,945 | 36.56 |
| George Kelly (X) | 1,758 | 33.05 |
| Eve Elliott | 918 | 17.26 |
| Michael Green | 699 | 13.14 |

Richmond Ward
| Candidate | Votes | % |
|---|---|---|
| Alex Cullen | 3,268 | 37.91 |
| Ron Kolbus | 2,922 | 33.90 |
| Daniel Stringer | 2,430 | 28.19 |

Riverside Ward
| Candidate | Votes | % |
|---|---|---|
| George Brown (X) | 4,140 | 67.88 |
| John Ross | 1,959 | 32.12 |

St. George's Ward
| Candidate | Votes | % |
|---|---|---|
| Nancy Mitchell | 2,499 | 42.86 |
| Gordon Brownlee | 938 | 16.09 |
| Ed Barter | 921 | 15.79 |
| Geoff Nimmo | 780 | 13.38 |
| Maurice Dumoulin | 543 | 9.31 |
| Paul Kerston | 114 | 1.96 |
| George Ibrahim | 36 | 0.62 |

Wellington Ward
| Candidate | Votes | % |
|---|---|---|
| Diane Holmes (X) | 3,579 | 78.09 |
| Keith Shirreffs | 709 | 15.47 |
| M. Ross Taylor | 295 | 6.44 |

== Ottawa Board of Education Trustees ==
| Zone 1 (Vanier, Rockcliffe Park, By-Rideau, St. George's, Overbrook-Forbes) 3 to be elected (98% of polls reporting) | Vote | % |
|---|---|---|
| Jane Dobell (X) | 5,175 | |
| Cynthia Bled (X) | 4,294 | |
| Harriet Lang (X) | 3,927 | |
| Debbie Morey | 2,546 | |
| Donna Silver | 2,047 | |
| Jeannine Denis-Ladouceur | 1,733 | |

| Zone 2 (Capital, Wellington) 2 to be elected | Vote | % |
|---|---|---|
| Anne Scotton (X) | 5,928 | 44.33 |
| Brian McGarry (X) | 5,737 | 42.90 |
| Rick Alexanderson | 1,708 | 12.77 |

| Zone 3 (Dalhousie, Riverside, Elmdale) 4 to be elected (98% of polls reporting) | Vote | % |
|---|---|---|
| Marian Lothian (X) | 6,720 | |
| Mary Lou Fleming (X) | 5,891 | |
| Elda M. Allen (X) | 5,843 | |
| Ted Best (X) | 3,806 | |
| Walter Robinson | 3,644 | |
| William J. Taylor | 3,253 | |
| Bill Pugsley | 3,253 | |
| John Dodson | 2,402 | |

| Zone 4 (Britannia, Richmond) 2 to be elected (95% of polls reporting) | Vote | % |
|---|---|---|
| Margaret Lange (X) | 4,977 | |
| Bill Gowling (X) | 3,376 | |
| Sandra Bertrand | 2,976 | |
| Sandra R. Goldstein | 2,351 | |
| Irma Cohen | 1,752 | |
| Christopher Assad | 688 | |
| Ed Halla | 408 | |

| Zone 5 (Carleton, Carlington-Westboro) 3 to be elected | Vote | % |
|---|---|---|
| Brian Mackey (X) | 5,235 | 27.15 |
| Kathy Yach (X) | 4,161 | 21.58 |
| Linda Hunter (X) | 4,018 | 20.83 |
| Shawn Marmer | 3,126 | 16.21 |
| John M. Wright | 2,742 | 14.22 |

| Zone 6 (Alta Vista, Billings, Canterbury) 4 to be elected (99% of polls reporting) | Vote | % |
|---|---|---|
| Margaret Woodley | 6,607 | |
| John Sutherland (X) | 6,216 | |
| Marjorie Loughrey (X) | 6,210 | |
| Russ Jackson (X) | 6,115 | |
| Sue Mack | 5,047 | |
| Roy Bushfield (X) | 4,453 | |
| Wayne Mannion | 1,271 | |
| Henry Assad | 1,111 | |
