= Mac Harb =

Canadian politician

The Honourable Mac Harb

Canadian Senator from Ontario
- In office September 9, 2003 – August 26, 2013
- Appointed by: Jean Chrétien

Member of Parliament for Ottawa Centre
- In office November 21, 1988 – September 8, 2003
- Preceded by: Michael Cassidy
- Succeeded by: Ed Broadbent

Personal details
- Born: November 10, 1953 (age 72) Chaat, Lebanon
- Party: Independent (May 10, 2013-August 26, 2013); Liberal Party of Canada (September 9, 2003-May 9, 2013)
- Occupation: Politician, engineer, college teacher

Mac Harb (Arabic: ماك هارب; born November 10, 1953) is a former Canadian politician, who served successively in local Ottawa positions, as a Member of the House of Commons, and as a Senator for Ontario. He resigned his seat as Senator in 2013 amidst the Canadian Senate expenses scandal.

== Life and career ==
Harb, was born in Chaat, Lebanon, and emigrated to Canada to study at the University of Ottawa in 1973. He subsequently worked as an engineer at Northern Telecom and taught at Algonquin College in Ottawa. Harb was elected to Ottawa City Council in 1985 and served as deputy mayor in 1987 and 1988.

He was first elected to the House of Commons of Canada in the 1988 federal election as the Liberal Member of Parliament (MP) for Ottawa Centre. He supported Jean Chrétien's bid to succeed John Turner as leader of the Liberal Party in 1990 and remained a Chrétien loyalist throughout his career as an MP.

In September 2003, Harb was appointed to the Senate of Canada on Chrétien's recommendation.

In March 2009, Harb attempted to introduce a bill that would have limited the East Coast seal hunt to only those with aboriginal treaty rights. No senator seconded his motion to introduce the bill, something that other senators could not recall happening in over two decades. He also attempted to introduce a bill in June 2011 that would outlaw commercial seal hunting, and had introduced a third bill against the seal hunt in May 2012. PETA subsequently honoured him as their "Canadian Person of the Year".

== Local Ottawa politics ==
After the 1991 Ottawa municipal election, Harb, who was a Liberal MP and had supported fiscally conservative, pro-business candidate Jacquelin Holzman, admitted to "quietly encourag[ing]" Marc Laviolette to enter the race to split the vote, because he "couldn't stomach Smith's left-wing social agenda" and the thought of Nancy Smith winning.

== Senate expense scandal ==
On December 6, 2012, Harb was named in relation to the Canadian Senate expenses scandal due to expenses for a property in Pembroke, Ontario. In May 2013, the Senate Internal Economy Committee found that Harb had incorrectly claimed $51,482.92 of living and travel expenses and ordered him to repay it, which was done by July 5, 2013. The committee had earlier advised Harb to repay $231,000 of claimed expenses dating back to 2005 to avoid an extensive audit into his finances. Harb stated that his repayment was done "under protest" since he intended to challenge the validity of the committee's findings in the Ontario Divisional Court. On August 26, 2013, he repaid a further $180,166.17, for a total reimbursement of $231,649.07, after which he resigned his Senate seat. In February 2014, Harb was charged with fraud and breach of trust in connection with these expense claims. Those charges were later withdrawn by the Crown in May 2016, after the acquittal of Senator Mike Duffy on his own expense-related criminal charges.
