= Stéphanie Plante =

Canadian politician (born 1979)

- Incumbent
- Assumed office November 15, 2022
- Preceded by: Mathieu Fleury
- Constituency: Rideau-Vanier Ward

Personal details
- Born: July 1979 (age 47) Tecumseh, Ontario
- Spouse(s): Orest Zakydalsky; David Moncur (div.)
- Children: 1
- Education: University of Windsor

Stéphanie Plante (born July 1979) is a Canadian politician. She is currently the city councillor for Rideau-Vanier Ward on Ottawa City Council. She was first elected in the 2022 Ottawa municipal election.

== Early life ==
Plante was born in Tecumseh, Ontario, the daughter of a Swiss mother and a Quebecois father.

Plante attended the University of Windsor, where she received a bachelor's and master's degree in political science. While attending the university, she did an internship with Liberal Member of Parliament Herb Gray, resulting in a move to Ottawa in 2004, first settling in Vanier. After moving to Ottawa, she worked for Elections Canada, and taught municipal governance at the University of Ottawa. In 2020, as a member of the Sandy Hill Community Association, Plante began a successful campaign to rename a neighbourhood park after local artist Annie Pootoogook who had drowned in 2016.

In 2017, she was a gestational surrogate for a gay couple, who now live in Spain.

== Career ==
Rideau-Vanier Ward's councillor Mathieu Fleury announced he was not running for re-election in the 2022 Ottawa municipal election, leaving the seat open. Plante decided to run for the seat, citing working for "every level of government, [being] a volunteer in the community, and [knowing] the issues and how the system works". In the campaign, Plante won the endorsement of former Liberal MPP Madeleine Meilleur and former mayor Jacquelin Holzman. Her main priorities in the election were improving health-care options and attracting new doctors to the ward, by having the city consult with physicians to see how to make the community attractive, opposing more homeless shelters, promotion and protection of the ByWard Market, more affordable housing and making the ward's neighbourhoods safer. In the election, Plante won the ward by just 323 votes, with 37% of the vote, defeating fellow University of Ottawa professor Laura Shantz.

Following her election, Plante was named vice-chair of the Built Heritage Committee and was named to the Community Services Committee, the Emergency Preparedness and Protective Services Committee, to the Ottawa Community Housing Corporation, and the Shaw Centre Board of Directors.

In August 2025, council voted 16–8 to reprimand Plante following an integrity commissioner report that found she had "harassed and intimidated residents using memes and emojis" during a 2024 debate on social media over a plan to house asylum seekers. Plante supported the plan, which would involve building newcomer reception centres in tent-like facilities, as she believed they would alleviate the strain on the city's current shelters. Plante defended her support on social media, but it was found that she had "contravened the code of conduct" in her responses to opponents. Her posts included using a meme which stated "Behold, a man has arrived to share his manly view" and the use of the thinking face emoji. Plante defended her conduct by suggesting that she did not use "abusive language", used "no threats, no insults, no profanity, nothing that meets the ordinary threshold of abuse, bullying, [or] intimidation". While council voted to reprimand Plante, it did not agree to dock her pay, which had been recommended in the report.

== Electoral record ==
2022 Ottawa City Council election: Rideau-Vanier Ward
Candidate	Popular vote			Expenditures
Candidate	Votes	%	±%	Expenditures
Stéphanie Plante	4,621	37.15	–	$27,931.57
Laura Shantz	4,298	34.55	–	$33,925.70
Julie Fiala	704	5.66	–	$2,474.75
Alex Osorio	671	5.39	–	$2,802.40
Jwane Izzetpanah	564	4.53	–	N/A
Tyler Cybulski	514	4.13	–	$1,301.77
Patrick Auguste	330	2.65	–	$5,038.93
Kim Leclerc	296	2.38	–	$3,954.47
Burthomley Douzable	266	2.14	–	$9,520.25
Hicham Boutaleb	176	1.41	–	$600.00
Total valid votes	12,440	96.78		
Total rejected, unmarked and declined votes	414	3.22		
Turnout	12,854	37.18	-0.36	
Eligible voters	34,574			
Note: Candidate campaign colours are based on the prominent colour used in campaign items (signs, literature, etc.) and are used as a visual differentiation between candidates.
