= Panhandling =

Panhandling may refer to:

- Aggressive panhandling
- Begging

== See also ==
- BEG (disambiguation)
- Mendicant, mendicant orders may authorize "begging" in some societies
- Salient (geography) or panhandle
