= Walter A. Scheiber =

American lawyer

- Born: Walter Abbe Scheiber; January 31, 1922; New York, New York, U.S.
- Died: October 8, 2014 (aged 92); Gaithersburg, Maryland, U.S.
- Known for: First executive director of the Metropolitan Washington Council of Governments
- Spouse: Barbara Gair Scheiber (1922-2021)

Walter A. Scheiber (January 31, 1922 – October 8, 2014) played an influential role in the development of regional government in the United States, as the first executive director of the Metropolitan Washington Council of Governments (1966-1991). During his leadership of the council, he led a number of cooperative regional initiatives on issues including air and water pollution, housing and cooperative purchasing; his advocacy to Congress helped support the creation of the Metro transit system in the Washington, D.C. area. The Washingtonian called him "the primary architect of regional planning and cooperation in Washington." On his retirement in 1991, a Washington Post editorial referred to him as a "'consummate professional, a superb diplomat,'" who was "held in the highest regard by professional colleagues across the country." He played a key role in founding the National Association of Regional Councils (NARC) and, having spent a decade before joining MWCOG as a city manager, was very active in the International City and County Management Association (ICMA).

== Early life ==
Scheiber was born in New York, New York, the oldest of three children of Israel Ben Scheiber, an attorney and labor arbitrator, and Augusta Abramson Scheiber, a concert pianist. He attended New York's High School of Music & Art and attended Swarthmore College from 1941 to 1944, where he majored in political science; he was awarded a bachelor's degree in political science as part of the combined class of 1944-46.

In 1944, Scheiber enlisted in the U.S. Army. As a Technical Sergeant, he flew 35 bombing missions as a radio operator and turret gunner on a B24 crew. Following his discharge he enrolled at Columbia University School of Law, receiving his L.L.B. in 1947.

Scheiber married Barbara Gair Scheiber in 1948. They have four children.

== Career ==
=== City management ===
Scheiber left the private practice of law to pursue a Masters in Public Administration at the University of Pennsylvania's Fels Institute of Government. In 1955 he became City Manager of Grove City, Pennsylvania for three years. He then moved to Rockville, Maryland where he worked as City Manager from 1958-1964. While Rockville City Manager, Scheiber served as the first president of the Maryland City Management Association, from 1960 to 1962. From 1964 to 1966, he worked as Vice President of DANAC, a real estate development company.

=== Regional government ===
In 1966, Scheiber was hired as the first Executive Director of the Metropolitan Washington Council of Governments (MWCOG). The organization had begun in 1957 as a rudimentary consortium of city and county leaders in Washington, D.C. and the surrounding areas of Maryland and Virginia. At the time of his hiring, Congress had just passed an amendment to the Housing and Urban Development Act of 1954, Section 701G, authorizing two-to-one matching funding for regional government councils. Over the next ten years, the number of Councils of Government, or COGs, grew from about 50 nationwide to nearly 500.

Under Scheiber's leadership, the Council staff provided testimony before Congress in favor of the Air Pollution Control Act (1970) and the Safe Streets Act (1970). The fields of air pollution control and water pollution amelioration became a major area of activity for the organization, as it brought together interested parties to accomplish the cleanup of the Potomac and Anacostia Rivers. Scheiber's advocacy to Congress helped to secure substantial additional Federal funding for the construction of the Metrorail mass-transit system.

A Washington Post article appearing at his retirement characterized Scheiber as "using a low-key, behind-the-scenes approach that encouraged area officials to use COG… to iron out differences and pool resources." "He created a climate where the jurisdictions knew they had to work together," according to David Robertson, the executive director of MWCOG from 2002 to 2012.

Scheiber secured funding for the first national conference of COGs, held in 1967, which led to the formation of the National Association of Regional Councils (NARC). He served as the first president of NARC, and later as president of the ICMA (1982).

Another initiative he undertook affected the participation of minorities in the fields of city management and regional government. In the mid-1970s, Scheiber approached the Department of Housing and Urban Development, along with Mark Keane, then executive director of the ICMA. Noting the growing number of African Americans achieving local elective offices, they persuaded HUD to allocate part of its Section 701g funding for financial support to African American students to receive graduate degrees in city administration. The program, which ran in Washington D.C., Atlanta, Dallas, Denver and San Francisco, has allowed thousands of minority students to enter the field.

=== Awards ===
Scheiber received the Winston Churchill Fellowship of the English Speaking Union in 1973. He was named a "Washingtonian of the Year" in 1974, and was selected as the outstanding local government career official in the United States and Canada in 1976 by the honorary society of Lambda Alpha.

== Retirement and legacy ==
After retiring from MWCOG, Scheiber served on the Montgomery County Ethics Commission (Chair, 2000), and chaired the transition team for Doug Duncan on Duncan's election as Executive of Montgomery County, Maryland in 1994.

His efforts led to the purchase of land and the construction of a permanent home for MWCOG, co-owned with the ICMA at 777 N. Capitol Street in Washington, D.C.

Each year, the National Association of Regional Councils bestows the Walter Scheiber Leadership Award on an executive director whose work has significantly affected the local, state and national level.

== Writing by Walter A. Scheiber ==
Civics, Commerce, and Community: The History of the Greater Washington Board of Trade, 1889-1989, with Jessica I. Elfenbein, Howard Gillette, and William H. Becker. Dubuque, IA: Kendall/Hunt Publishing Company, 1989.

"The Regional Council Director: Roles and Responsibilities." Public Management (International City Managers Association) vol. 68, no. 10 (October 1986): 2-4.

"Locally, Uncertain Success." Op-Ed in the Washington Post, January 1, 1985.

"The Area Heads into a Year of Recovery." Op-Ed in the Washington Post, January 1, 1984.

"In the New Year, Government Needs Good Business." Op-Ed in the Washington Post, December 27, 1981.

"A Metropolitan View." EPA Journal (United States Environmental Protection Agency) vol. 5, no. 26 (May 1979): 26-27.

"A New Day for the Handicapped," with Barbara Scheiber. Public Management, vol. 60, no. 1 (January 1978).

"The ICMA Code of Ethics." Public Management vol. 57, no. 6 (June 1975): 15-16.

"Local Government from the British Experience." HUD Challenge (U.S. Department of Housing and Urban Development) vol. V, no. 7 (July 1974).

"British Local Government: A Quiet Revolution." Public Management vol. 57, no. 6 (January 1974): 14-16.

"Washington's Regional Development." Records of the Columbia Historical Society, Washington, D.C. (Historical Society of Washington, D.C.) vol. 49 (1973/1974), 595-603.

"Regionalism: Its Implications for the Urban Manager." Public Administration Review (American Society for Public Administration) vol. XXXI, no. 1 (January/Feb 1971): 42-46.

"Councils of Governments: An Assessment." Public Management vol. 52, no. 4 (April 1970): 24-25.

"Evolution of a COG: Tackling the Tough Jobs." Public Management vol. 51 no. 1 (1969): 10-12.

"Currents and Soundings: From the Professional Stream" with David Mars and Jerzy Hauptmann. Public Administration Review vol. 27, No. 3 (September 1967): 252-261.

"Evolving a Policy Process for a Metropolitan Region." Public Administration Review, 1967.

"A Council of Governments …provides the practical structure for an orderly approach to metropolitan programs in the complex Washington, D.C., area." American City, April 1967.

"701 to the Rescue." American City, April 1961, 91-92.

"Rockville Plans for 1980." Maryland Municipal News (Maryland Municipal League) vol. 13, no. 5 (May 1960): 5.
