= Pierre Bourque (journalist) =

Canadian racing driver (1958–2021)

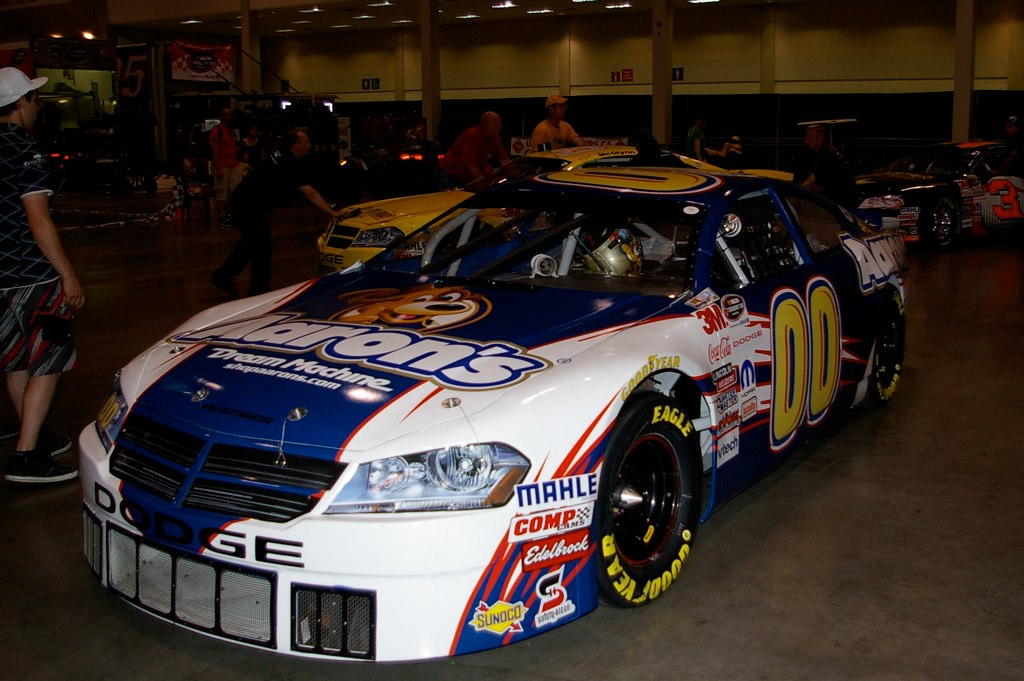
- Bourque's 2010 NASCAR Canadian Tire Series car

Ottawa City Councillor for By-Rideau Ward
- In office March 4, 1991 – December 1, 1991
- Preceded by: Marc Laviolette
- Succeeded by: Richard Cannings

Personal details
- Born: October 7, 1958 Ottawa
- Died: August 28, 2021 (aged 62)
- Profession: Journalist, race car driver

NASCAR FedEx Freight Truck Series career
- 2 races run over 2 years
- Best finish: 101st (2009)
- First race: 2009 Power Stroke Diesel 200 (IRP)
- Last race: 2009 Lucas Oil 200 (Iowa)
Wins	Top tens	Poles
0	0	0

NASCAR Canada Series career
- 33 races run over 6 years
- 2011 position: 28th
- Best finish: 15th (2010)
- First race: 2006 Griddly Headz 100 (Edmonton)
- Last race: 2011 Wild Wing 300 (Barrie)
Wins	Top tens	Poles
0	4	0
- Statistics up to date as of June 17, 2012.

André Pierre Bourque Jr. (October 7, 1958 – August 28, 2021) was a race car driver, developer, journalist, broadcaster and former politician in Ottawa, Ontario, and operated the online news aggregator site Bourque Newswatch (Newswatch).

Bourque was born at the Ottawa General Hospital in 1958, the son of Pierre Bourque (Sr.) and Barbara McNeil. He was the grandson of E. A. Bourque, Ottawa's first francophone mayor.

== Politics ==
Following a ten-year career as a race car driver, and a brief apprenticeship with his father's land development business, Bourque was appointed to Ottawa City Council and the Regional Municipality of Ottawa-Carleton in March 1991 to fill a vacancy after Marc Laviolette became mayor. Bourque was appointed following a council vote, defeating 17 other candidates, including community activists Maurice Pagé and Richard Cannings. Bourque was supported by the "pro-developer" bloc on council, and was opposed by the council's left wing, who coalesced behind Pagé. Bourque's stay on council was short lived, however, and he was defeated by Cannings in the municipal election that November. While on council, he opposed "all big projects", including bringing in a Triple-A baseball team and improving Lansdowne Park. He also opposed all tax increases, and called for the demolition of some heritage buildings in his ward such as the Daly Building. He had near-perfect attendance in both committee and council meetings.

Two years later, Bourque ran for Parliament in the 1993 Canadian election as a Liberal candidate in the Montreal riding of Rosemont, and lost to Bloc Québécois candidate Benoît Tremblay.

Bourque ran for Ottawa city council again in 1994, in the new Bruyère-Strathcona Ward but was defeated by Stéphane Émard-Chabot. At this point in his career, he was vice president of his father's company, Bourque, Pierre & Fils. He ran on a platform of safety, improving street lighting and basic services, and called for the removal of traffic barriers in the Byward Market. He also wanted to "control taxes by cutting frivolous expenditures". Despite his campaign of fiscal restraint, Bourque was embroiled in a scandal during the campaign as he owed $1.1 million to creditors, after his father promised to repay some of his debts, but went to other debts instead.

== Journalism ==
In 2001, the Ryerson Review of Journalism (RRJ) criticized Bourque and Newswatch. RRJ said Bourque had not written some of his books but only acted as a researcher. In addition, many of Newswatch's breaking stories had often been inaccurate. RRJ also reported that, despite Bourque's web traffic claims, a random sample indicated that Canadian Internet users had not visited the Newswatch site and that no major Canadian journalist used Newswatch as a source.

Newswatch has also been criticized for allowing advertisers to purchase headlines and to "torque" them to highlight a positive news story about itself or a negative story about an opponent.

Bourque was a fill-in host and contributor to radio talk shows on 580 CFRA.

== Racing driver ==
Bourque was race car driver in the NASCAR Busch East Series and NASCAR Canadian Tire Series, competing from 2007 to 2011.

== Motorsports career results ==
=== NASCAR ===
(key) (Bold – Pole position awarded by qualifying time. Italics – Pole position earned by points standings or practice time. * – Most laps led.)

==== Nationwide Series ====
NASCAR Nationwide Series results
Year	Team	No.	Make	1	2	3	4	5	6	7	8	9	10	11	12	13	14	15	16	17	18	19	20	21	22	23	24	25	26	27	28	29	30	31	32	33	34	35	NNSC	Pts	Ref
2010	Specialty Racing	61	Ford	DAY	CAL	LVS	BRI	NSH	PHO	TEX	TAL	RCH	DAR	DOV	CLT	NSH	KEN	ROA	NHA	DAY	CHI	GTY	IRP	IOW	GLN	MCH	BRI	CGV; DNQ	ATL	RCH	DOV	KAN	CAL	CLT	GTY	TEX	PHO	HOM	153th	-	

==== Camping World Truck Series ====
NASCAR Camping World Truck Series results
Year	Team	No.	Make	1	2	3	4	5	6	7	8	9	10	11	12	13	14	15	16	17	18	19	20	21	22	23	24	25	NCWTC	Pts	Ref
2007	Fast Track Racing	71	Chevy	DAY	CAL	ATL	MAR	KAN	CLT	MFD	DOV	TEX	MCH	MLW	MEM	KEN	IRP; 36	NSH	BRI	GTW	NHA	LVS	TAL	MAR	ATL	TEX	PHO	HOM	115th	55	
2009	Fast Track Racing	48	Chevy	DAY	CAL	ATL	MAR	KAN	CLT	DOV	TEX	MCH	MLW	MEM	KEN	IRP	NSH	BRI	CHI	IOW; 29	GTW	NHA	LVS	MAR	TAL	TEX	PHO	HOM	101st	76	

=== Rolex Sports Car Series ===
==== Grand Touring ====
(key) Bold – Pole Position. (Overall Finish/Class Finish).

Grand-Am Rolex Sports Car Series GT results
Year	Team	No.	Engine	Chassis	1	2	3	4	5	6	7	8	9	10	11	12	13	14	Pos	Pts	Ref
2007	The Racer's Group	67	Pontiac 5.0L V8	Porsche GT3 Cup	DAY (28/12)	MEX	HOM	VIR	LGA	WGL	MOH	DAY	IOW	BAR	MON	WGL	INF	MIL	119th	19	

== Personal life ==
Bourque was married to Kristine Haselsteiner and had two children.

== Death ==
Bourque died of a heart attack in 2021.
