= Richard Cannings =

Richard Cannings may refer to:

- Richard Cannings (British Columbia politician), Canadian federal Member of Parliament from British Columbia,
- Richard Cannings (Ontario politician), former city councillor in Ottawa
