= Mathieu Fleury =

Canadian politician

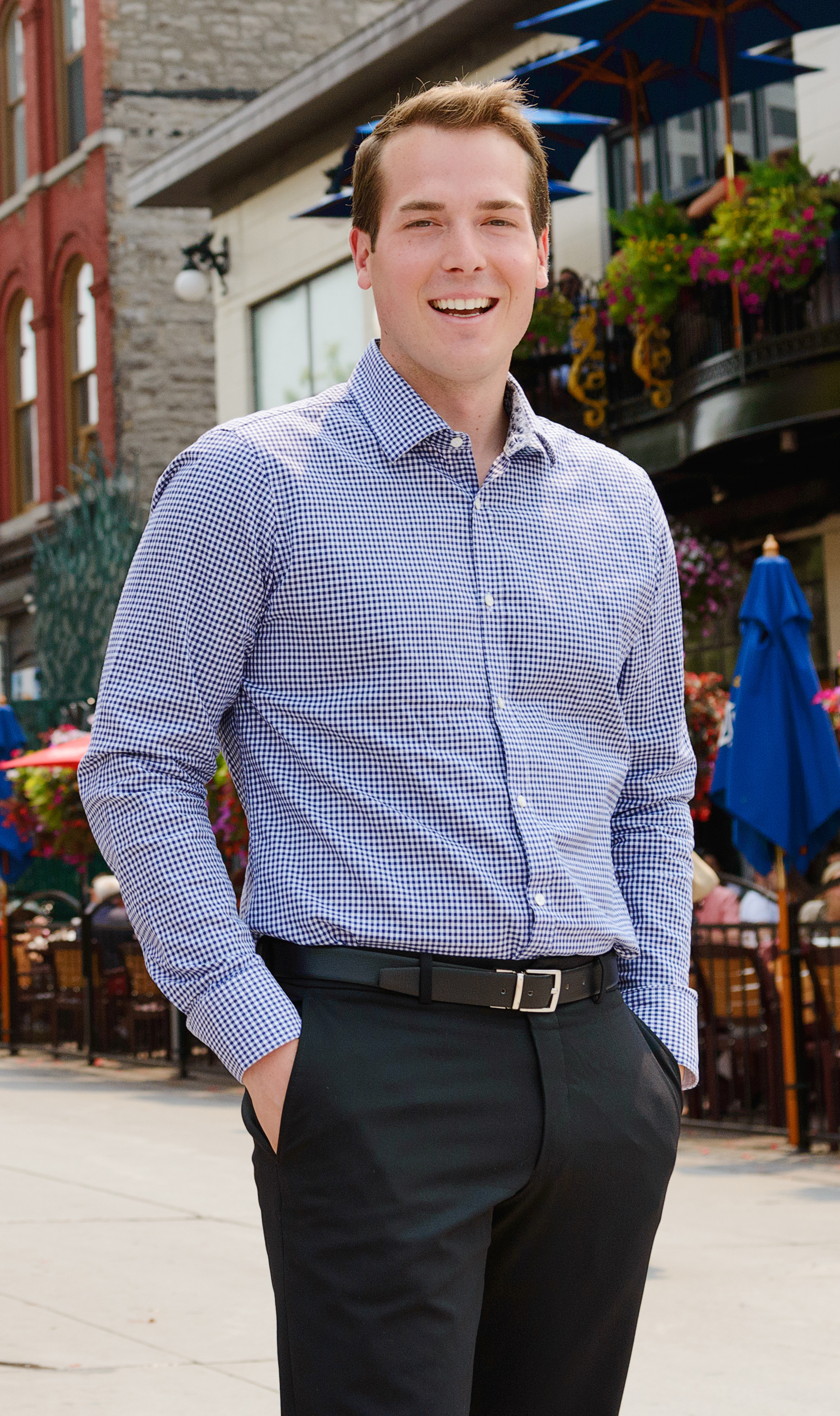
- Fleury in 2014

Ottawa City Councillor
- In office December 1, 2010 – November 15, 2022
- Preceded by: Georges Bédard
- Succeeded by: Stéphanie Plante
- Constituency: Rideau-Vanier Ward

CEPEO Trustee
- Incumbent
- Assumed office November 15, 2026
- Preceded by: Sonia Boudreault
- Constituency: Zone 10

Personal details
- Born: September 26, 1985 (age 41) Ottawa, Ontario
- Spouse: Lai Hoang

Mathieu Fleury (born September 26, 1985 in Ottawa, Ontario) is the former Ottawa City Councillor of Rideau-Vanier Ward. He won the ward in the 2010 Ottawa municipal election, defeating the incumbent Georges Bédard in a narrow contest, the youngest City Councillor to be elected at that time. He was re-elected as the councillor in the 2014 and 2018 Ottawa municipal elections. He indicated in early 2022 that he would not seek re-election in the 2022 municipal elections.

He was the recipient of the 2023 Bernard Grandmaitre award from ACFO Ottawa and L'Ordre de la Pléiade "Chevalier" 2023.

== Early life and education ==
Fleury was born in Ottawa and raised in Sandy Hill and Lowertown neighbourhoods.

He attended Francojeunesse and Franco-Cité School in Ottawa, and later attended the University of Ottawa.

== Municipal career ==
Fleury was the chair of the Ottawa Community Housing Board, the Ottawa Sports Commissioner, a member of the city of Ottawa's Transportation Committee and the Community and Protective Services Committee.

During his career, Fleury lobbied for infrastructure improvements, including the Adawe Bridge, the reconstruction of Sussex Drive, Rideau Street Reconstruction and Montreal Road development. He supported the city of Ottawa's move to become a bilingual city. Fleury has also lobbied for the increasing of "safe supply" of narcotics, which he claims to prevent overdosing and drug-associated crime.

Following his term in office, Fleury worked as the interim executive director of J.W. MacIntosh Community Support Services in Williamsburg, Ontario, an organization that provides housing and community support services.

On August 28, 2023, it was announced by Cornwall, Ontario, Mayor Justin Towndale, that Fleury would serve as the city's new chief administrative officer (CAO) for a period of 5 years.

On October 9, 2024, Katherine Wells, director of government relations and corporate priorities for the City of Cornwall, released a brief statement to the media that the city had "parted ways" with Fleury.

In March 2026, new figures from Ontario’s Sunshine List (which tracks public sector salaries), indicated that Mathieu Fleury received some $229,464.90 in 2025 from the City of Cornwall although not reported as working for the municipality since leaving City Hall in October 2024. Even without an additional $2,154.57 reported as benefits, this put Fleury ahead of all other City of Cornwall workers in 2025.

== Personal life ==
Fleury is married to his wife Lai.

He has made political donations to several Liberal politicians in the past, including Madeleine Meilleur, Mona Fortier and Nathalie Des Rosiers.
