= Georges Bédard =

Canadian politician

Ottawa City Councillor
- In office 1974–1980
- Preceded by: Jules Morin
- Succeeded by: Nancy Smith and Marc Laviolette
- Constituency: By-St. George's Ward
- In office 2003–2010
- Preceded by: Madeleine Meilleur
- Succeeded by: Mathieu Fleury
- Constituency: Rideau-Vanier Ward

Personal details
- Born: 1945 (age 80–81) Ottawa
- Spouse: Louise

Georges A. Bédard (born 1945 in Ottawa, Ontario) is a former member of Ottawa City Council representing the ward of By-St. George's from 1974 to 1980 and Rideau-Vanier from 2003 to 2010.

Born and raised in the area, Bédard currently lives in Sandy Hill. He attended Carleton University, where he obtained a degree in political science. He first became involved in local politics in the successful effort to block the construction of the King Edward Expressway. He was first elected to city council at a young age in 1974 and served on the council until 1980. During this period he was best known for his efforts at preserving heritage structures. Upon leaving the council he became president of the Heritage Canada Foundation. He is also among the founders of the Franco-Ontarian Festival, and of Ottawa's Pollution Probe. He later joined the federal civil service serving as a land claims negotiator. He also had a number of other duties including serving as president of Ottawa's Tulip Festival. In the 2003 Ottawa election he returned to Ottawa's city council, replacing Madeleine Meilleur who had become a member of the provincial legislature. Meilleur endorsed Bédard's return to city council and he elected with 42% of the vote with his closest rival getting 27%.

He was re-elected in the 2006 Ottawa election with 47% of the vote to his closest, Bruce McConville, 45%, the narrowest margin of victory of any of the incumbent councillors. He lost the 2010 Ottawa election to Mathieu Fleury.

== Homelessness ==
In July, 2006 Bédard became vocal about the concentration of services offered to homeless people in Ottawa. Bédard has been critical of adding to the six shelters which are located in his Rideau-Vanier ward, arguing that concentrating homeless services in one spot ghettoizes the area and makes it harder for people to escape poverty and homelessness. City Council has passed Bédard's motion on having an interim moratorium on creating any more special needs housing in Rideau-Vanier until zoning review is completed. The review resulted in new zoning rules that limited the number of shelters per ward, allowed shelters in other parts of the city where they were not allowed before, and prohibited shelters and social services from residential zones. . This meshed with Bédard's earlier study, which limited group homes to 10 persons or less and allowed them in all residential areas.

Bedard was also successful in preventing the opening of new nightclubs, bars and pubs in his ward, and has tried unsuccessfully to get some of the area's bus shelters removed, saying that drug dealers and panhandlers use them.

== Anti-noise by-law ==
In February 2010, Bédard proposed a by-law to city council which would allow the city to fine people $300 for engaging "in loud, boisterous, threatening, abusive, insulting or indecent language" or becoming "a nuisance to the general public using the highway or to adjacent property owners". The proposed by-law is aimed specifically at the Byward Market which is within Bédard's ward. The proposed by-law came under attack by the Ottawa Panhandlers Union, whose spokesman say the proposed by-law is unconstitutional. The Canadian Civil Liberties Association also opposed the proposed by-law.

Preceded by Madeleine Meilleur	City councillors from Rideau-Vanier Ward; 2003-2010	Succeeded by Mathieu Fleury
Preceded by Jules Morin	City councillors from By-St. George's Ward; 1974-1980	Succeeded by Ward abolished. See Nancy Smith and Marc Laviolette
