= John Prystanski =

Canadian city councillor

John Prystanski is a former city councillor in Winnipeg, Manitoba, Canada. He represented the north-end ward of Point Douglas from 1989 to 2002.

== City councillor ==
=== 1989-1995 ===
Prystanski was first elected to the Winnipeg City Council in the 1989 municipal election, defeating incumbent councillor Terry Wachniak. He was still in his mid-20s at the time of his first election, and worked with the City of Winnipeg streets and transportation department.

He was on the right wing of council. He was appointed to the board of the Winnipeg Enterprises Corp. shortly after the election. Re-elected in 1992, he was chosen over Glen Murray the following year to serve on Winnipeg's safe city committee. Some women's groups expressed concern that he was not sufficiently sensitive to their concerns. He also chaired an ad hoc committee that sought to win tax credits for Winnipeg residents who renovate older homes.

Prystanski was appointed to the Planning and Community Services Committee in 1993. The following month, he and Glen Murray were the only two councillors to vote against spending $30,000 on a bid for the 1995 Grey Cup.

Prystanski represented one of Winnipeg's lowest-income areas. In 1993, he called for a crackdown on prostitution through traffic restrictions and greater lighting. On another occasion, he described Winnipeg's licensing system as ineffective in cracking down on underage drinkers. He helped establish the Westland Foundation in 1994, with the intent of providing funding for inner-city projects. He supported the maintenance of historical sites in his ward, and angrily rejected Al Golden's suggestion that Point Douglas was too dangerous for municipal heritage projects. Prystanski also supported community policing, and threatened a crackdown on local flea markets in 1995.

Prystanski supported efforts to keep the Winnipeg Jets hockey team in Winnipeg, and was an early backer of a new arena proposal from the Manitoba Entertainment Complex in 1994-95. In August 1995, he supported a proposed municipal reform to give the Mayor of Winnipeg the ability to cast an extra tie-breaking vote on council. He opposed extending municipal benefits to the partners of same-sex couples in 1994.

Prystanski became a member of the Manitoba Métis Federation in 1994, citing his mother's heritage in a Métis family in Ste. Rose du Lac. He described himself as having no party affiliation in a 1995 interview.

=== 1995-2002 ===
Prystanski endorsed the mayoral candidacy of Peter Kaufmann in the 1995 municipal election, who finished a surprisingly strong second against incumbent Susan Thompson, while Prystanski was easily re-elected in his own ward. He was chosen as deputy speaker of council shortly after the election.

When the City of Winnipeg began looking for a new police chief in late 1995, Prystanski argued that the successful candidate should be committed to community policing and have good relations with visible minority communities. In April 1996, he supported the contracting-out of transit services for persons with disabilities.

Prystanski remained involved with several initiatives intended to address the poverty and challenging living conditions of his ward. He supported unsuccessful efforts to introduce a strict youth curfew. In June 1996, he asked federal Justice Minister Allan Rock to introduce legislation allowing drivers to lose their cars if caught soliciting for prostitution. This plan was rejected in a 1997 municipal report, but was implemented by the provincial government in 1999. In 1998, he supported a plan to ban squeegee kids from Winnipeg's streets.

Some regarded Prystanski's voting record as inappropriate for the representative of a low-income ward, and he was opposed by an ad hoc citizens' group called "It's Our City" in the 1998 election. He was also targeted by the Canadian Union of Public Employees. He was nonetheless re-elected, with a narrow victory over rival candidate Pauline Riley. He again endorsed the mayoral candidacy of Peter Kaufmann, who was narrowly defeated by Glen Murray.

Prystanski sought re-election as Deputy Speaker when council reconvened, but was defeated by Harry Lazarenko. He was subsequently appointed to the Property and Development Committee. In 1999, he led a task force that examined a spate of arsons within his ward. In 2000, he voted in favour of a motion for municipal term limits.

In 2000, Prystanski launched a motorcycle refinishing and parts business called The Chrome Pit. He was later criticized by the media and other councillors for devoting more time to his business than to his duties as a councillor. A 2002 article in the Winnipeg Free Press indicated that he was often late or absent from council and committee meetings, and rarely turned up at his municipal office. Soon after the article was published, Prystanski indicated that he would not be a candidate in the next election.

He later supported MaryAnn Mihychuk in a 2004 mayoral by-election.

=== After Politics ===
After Prystanski’s final term ended as a city councillor, he went into private practice as a lawyer. In 2019, he was hired by an anonymous citizens group which uncovered a high-profile theft ring within the City of Winnipeg’s Building Inspectors. The group provided an in-depth report of its findings to the City of Winnipeg. Followed by a Human Resources internal investigation; eight city employees were terminated and an additional seven received suspensions.
