= Rawlson King =

Canadian politician

Ottawa City Councillor
- Incumbent
- Assumed office April 16, 2019
- Preceded by: Tobi Nussbaum
- Constituency: Rideau-Rockcliffe Ward

Personal details
- Born: Toronto, Ontario, Canada
- Spouse: Linda Grussani

Rawlson O'Neil King is a Canadian politician, who was elected to Ottawa City Council in a by-election on April 15, 2019 and re-elected October 24, 2022. King is the city's first-ever Black Canadian city councillor.

== Background ==
King was born and raised in Toronto and educated at Bayview Glen School. His parents were teachers from Saint Vincent and the Grenadines, and his father was born in Aruba. King holds both a combined bachelor of journalism with legal studies and a M.A. in communication from Carleton University.

King served as president of the Overbrook Community Association, a board member at the Rideau-Rockcliffe Community Resource Centre, and co-chair of the Ottawa Police Service Community Equity Council before his election to Council. He won a United Way Ottawa Community Builder of the Year Award in 2018.

== Politics ==
King succeeded Tobi Nussbaum as councillor for Rideau-Rockcliffe Ward in the 2019 Rideau-Rockcliffe municipal by-election. King had previously run in Rideau-Rockcliffe in the 2010 municipal election and ran for a trustee seat on the Ottawa-Carleton District School Board in the 2018 municipal election. He was unsuccessful on both occasions.

In his successful by-election bid, King was endorsed by a number of high-profile progressives in Ottawa. Once elected, King identified his priorities as developing a poverty reduction strategy for impoverished neighbourhoods; working to improve roads, public transit and social services; and improving the relationship of people of colour with the police.

During his first term, King served as Chair of the Built Heritage Sub-Committee and on the Standing Committee on Environmental Protection, Water and Waste Management. He also served on the boards of Crime Prevention Ottawa, Ottawa Community Housing Corporation, Ottawa Community Lands Development Corporation and Quartier Vanier BIA. He was formerly on the Ottawa Police Services Board, before resigning in protest following the removal of board chair Diane Deans in the wake of Ottawa "Freedom Convoy".

To advance anti-racism and race relations initiatives in 2020, King was appointed Council Liaison for Anti-Racism and Ethnocultural Relations Initiatives, where he was successful in establishing an anti-racism office and the city's first anti-racism strategy.

He was re-elected in a landslide victory in 2022 with over 80 percent of the popular vote in a four-person field and a 72 percent margin of victory.

During his second term, King was appointed Chair of the Built Heritage Committee and served on the Finance and Corporate Services Committee, Environment and Climate Change Committee, and the Community Services Committee. He was also appointed to the boards of Ottawa Public Health, the Ottawa Public Library and Quartier Vanier BIA. King was also reappointed Council Liaison for the City’s Anti-Racism and Ethnocultural Relations Initiatives, leading the implementation of the City of Ottawa's Anti-Racism Strategy.

King endorsed Yasir Naqvi in his candidacy for leader of the Ontario Liberal Party in the 2023 Ontario Liberal Party leadership election.

== Electoral record ==
=== 2022 Ottawa municipal election ===
2022 Ottawa municipal election: Rideau—Rockcliffe
Candidate	Popular vote			Expenditures
Candidate	Votes	%	±%	Expenditures
Rawlson King (X)	8,481	80.14	+61.78	$23,200
Clayton Fitzsimmons	859	8.12		$650
Peter Jan Karwacki	716	6.77	+6.19	$178.54
Peter Zanette	527	4.98		$131.01
Total valid votes	10,583	94.36		
Total rejected, unmarked and declined votes	633	5.64		
Turnout	11,216	39.74	+2.59	
Eligible voters	28,220			
Note: Candidate campaign colours are based on the prominent colour used in campaign items (signs, literature, etc.) and are used as a visual differentiation between candidates.

=== 2019 Rideau-Rockcliffe by-election ===
Rideau-Rockcliffe (Ward 13)
Candidate	Votes	%
Rawlson King	1,529	18.36
Jamie Kwong	1,406	16.88
Penny Thompson	851	10.22
Marc Dorgeville	794	9.53
Sheila Perry	742	8.91
Maurice Lamirande	708	8.5
Johan Hamels	665	7.98
Kasia Adamiec	507	6.09
Chris Penton	441	5.29
Oriana Ngabirano	247	2.97
Patrick Mayangi	135	1.62
Miklos Horvath	89	1.07
Peter Heyck	58	0.7
Peter Jan Karwacki	48	0.58
Jerry Kovacs	46	0.55
Idris Ben-Tahir	35	0.42
Bruce A. Faulkner	29	0.35

=== 2018 Ottawa municipal election ===
Ottawa-Carleton District School Board (Zone 12)
Candidate	Votes	%
Sandra Schwartz (X)	7,265	74.31
Rawlson King	2,511	25.69

=== 2010 Ottawa municipal election ===
Rideau-Rockcliffe (Ward 13)
Candidate	Votes	%
Peter D. Clark	2,722	25.84
Maurice Lamirande	1,835	17.42
Sheila Perry	1,709	16.22
Bruce Poulin	1,695	16.09
Richard Cannings	1,333	12.65
Corry Burke	438	4.16
Rawlson King	380	3.61
Pierre Maheu	224	2.13
Harley Collison	129	1.22
James Parker	69	0.66
