= Stéphane Émard-Chabot =

Canadian politician

Ottawa City Councillor for Bruyère-Strathcona Ward
- In office 1994–2000
- Preceded by: Richard Cannings; Nancy Mitchell
- Succeeded by: Madeleine Meilleur

Personal details
- Born: Ottawa, Ontario
- Occupation: Lawyer

Stéphane Émard-Chabot is a former Ottawa city councillor who has served as assistant dean of the University of Ottawa law school since 2001. A native of Sandy Hill, he has a B.Comm and law degree from Ottawa and a degree from École Supérieure de Commerce de Paris. After obtaining his degree he became a professor at La Cité collégiale and also head of the Action Sandy Hill community group.

He was elected to city council in 1994 at age 28. Openly gay, one of the first issues the city council faced was whether to recognize Gay Pride Day. Mayor Jacquelin Holzman pushed through a compromise that recognized a generic "Pride Day", much to the displeasure of Émard-Chabot and other councillors. One of the most left wing city councillors, he supported legalizing prostitution. He also led the effort to scrap a municipal bylaw that forced stores to close at 6 p.m. He chose not to run for reelection in 2000, joining a private law firm and opening a boutique on Sussex Drive in Ottawa with his boyfriend. He closed the store three years later.

He was also appointed as chair of the board of directors of the Ottawa Community Housing Corporation in 2000 after leaving politics, but was fired from this position, along with the rest of the board, after a 2004 dispute with city council.

In addition to his work at the University of Ottawa, he has worked with local media (CBC, Radio-Canada and the French-language paper Le Droit) as a municipal affairs columnist.
