= Nancy Smith (politician) =

Canadian politician (born c. 1946)

Nancy Smith (born c. 1946) is a former Ottawa City Councillor. She represented St. George's Ward between 1980 and 1991.

Prior to being elected, Smith served in both Federal and Provincial Public Services for ten years. She has a Bachelor of Arts in Sociology and Psychology from Dalhousie University, and a Master of Arts in Sociology from Carleton University. Whilst on the council, she was seen as being left wing. She ran for mayor in 1991, losing to Jacquelin Holzman by just over 3,000 votes. After the election, Liberal MP Mac Harb (who supported Holzman) admitted to "quietly encourag[ing]" incumbent mayor Marc Laviolette to enter the race to split the vote, because he "couldn't stomach (the thought of) Smith's left wing social agenda" winning.

Since her defeat, Smith has served as the chair of the Ontario Housing Corporation, served on the Ontario Municipal Board, was an associate for MAXGROUP Associates, and since 1999 she has owned her own consulting business.
