= Tobi Nussbaum =

Ottawa City Councillor
- In office December 1, 2014 – January 26, 2019
- Preceded by: Peter Clark
- Succeeded by: Rawlson King
- Constituency: Rideau-Rockcliffe Ward

Personal details
- Born: 1969 (age 56–57)
- Profession: diplomat

Tobias "Tobi" Nussbaum (born c. 1969) is the chief executive officer of the National Capital Commission, a federal crown corporation that acts as the long-term planner of federal lands and principal steward of nationally significant public places, amounting to 12 percent of the landmass of the National Capital Region and including Gatineau Park, the Greenbelt and Canada's Official Residences. Prior to taking up his post, he was a City Councillor for Rideau-Rockcliffe Ward in Ottawa, Ontario from 2014 to 2019. Nussbaum spent more than a decade as a diplomat in Global Affairs Canada, including postings to the United Nations in New York City during Canada's last term on the Security Council and the World Trade Organization in Geneva.

== Early life and education ==
Nussbaum grew up in Toronto, attending North Toronto Collegiate Institute. He earned an undergraduate degree at Queen's University, and graduated with an LL.B. from the University of Victoria. He holds a Master of Public Administration from the Kennedy School of Government at Harvard. Nussbaum also studied at the University of Freiburg and Utrecht University. He speaks English, French and German.

== Career ==
Nussbaum joined the Department of Foreign Affairs and International Trade in 1996, working on international environmental law files in the Department's Legal Bureau and then international trade issues before moving to New York to join Canada's United Nations Security Council team in 1999. He then worked as Chief of Staff to Robert Fowler, Canada's Sherpa to the 2002 G7 Summit in Kananaskis, Alberta. After his posting to Geneva at the Canadian Mission to the World Trade Organization, Nussbaum returned to Ottawa in 2005 to work as Director of US Relations, then Director General of the Corporate Secretariat at Global Affairs Canada before moving to the Privy Council Office as Director of Social Development Policy. In 2010, he was appointed Director General of Strategic Policy at the then Canadian International Development Agency (since merged with Global Affairs Canada). In that position he was responsible for the agency's policy development and research work, economic analysis and international strategy, including policy engagement with multilateral organizations and other donors. He co-chaired the International Network on Conflict-Affected and Fragile States (INCAF) housed at the OECD.

In 2014, Nussbaum took a leave of absence from the Canadian Foreign Service to run against Peter Clark, the incumbent Councillor for Rideau-Rockcliffe Ward, whom he beat, attaining almost 50 percent of the vote. In December 2014, Nussbaum was the only freshman Councillor to be appointed as a Committee Chair. He ran for re-election in the 2018 Ottawa Municipal Election and won with over 80 percent of the vote, before leaving to head up the National Capital Commission.

== Personal life ==
Nussbaum is married to Dr. Elizabeth Muggah, past President of the Ontario College of Family Physicians and an Ottawa-based Family Doctor and University of Ottawa Associate Professor. They have two daughters.

== Election results ==
=== 2014 Ottawa Municipal Election ===
Council candidate	Vote	%
Tobi Nussbaum	4,846	47.19
Peter D. Clark (X)	1,871	18.22
Sheila Perry	1,423	13.86
Penny Thompson	994	9.68
Jevone Nicholas	846	8.24
Cam Holmstrom	290	2.82

=== 2018 Ottawa Municipal Election ===
Rideau-Rockcliffe (Ward 13)	Vote	%
Tobi Nussbaum (X)	7,334	80.52
Peter Heyck	1,774	19.48
