= By-Rideau Ward =

By-Rideau
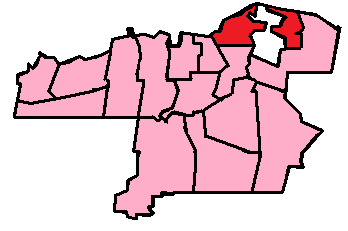
- Location within Ottawa (1980–1991)
- Country: Canada
- Province: Ontario
- City: Ottawa

Government
  - Councillor: Marc Laviolette (1980–1991); Pierre Bourque (1991); Richard Cannings (1991–1994)

Population 1976 Canadian census
  - Total: 21,956

By-Rideau Ward was an electoral ward that was represented on Ottawa City Council from 1980 to 1994.

The ward was created when the city added four more seats to council, necessitating ward boundaries being redrawn in 1979. It was carved out of parts of By-St. George's Ward and Rideau Ward. It consisted of that part of the city north of Rideau Street and Montreal Road, east of the Rideau Canal and west of the eastern limit of the Rockcliffe Airport and Brittany Drive. For the 1991 election, the ward's eastern boundary was extended eastward to the city limits (Blair Road).

The ward contained the neighbourhoods of Lowertown, New Edinburgh, Manor Park, and Lindenlea. During the boundary change process, By-St. George's alderman Georges Bédard believed the Byward Market (located in Lowertown) should have been excluded from the new ward, and added to St. George's Ward.

From 1980 to 1991, the ward was represented by Marc Laviolette. He represented the ward until his appointment as Mayor of Ottawa in February 1991. Pierre Bourque was then appointed on March 4 to fill the seat for the remainder of the term. Richard Cannings represented the ward from 1991 until it was redistributed in 1994.

The ward was abolished prior to the 1994 election when city council was reduced in size by 5 seats. Lowertown became part of Ward 5 (later renamed Bruyère-Strathcona Ward), while the rest of the ward became part of Ward 4 (later renamed Rideau Ward).

== Demographics ==
At its creation, the ward had a population of 21,965. 46.2 per cent of the population was Francophone, the highest proportion in the city. The ward also had a sizable population of senior citizens at 16.6 per cent. By the 1991 election, the Francophone population had dropped to 31 per cent.

== Elections ==
=== 1980 ===
The candidates in the 1980 election were Marc Laviolette, 29, a commerce teacher at École secondaire publique De La Salle living in Lowertown west, and Bruce Grant, 39, a civil engineer-turned-businessman from New Edinburgh, who owned a retail business in the Byward Market. Laviolette was the head of the Lowertown Citizen's Group, while Grant was the president of the New Edinburgh Community Association, the president of the Market Association and member of the Rideau Centre Project Advisory group. Grant had previously run in the 1978 election in Rideau Ward, where he lost to Rhéal Robert.

Main issues in the 1980 election included "safeguarding the interests of the established communities against the intrusion of regional road networks", such as the extension of the Vanier arterial through New Edinburgh, and the proposed St. Patrick-Beechwood-Hemlock arterial, which threatened to cut through Lowertown. The Vanier arterial was the most discussed issue in an all-candidates debate. It was a proposed extension of the Vanier Parkway through New Edinburgh to connect it to the Macdonald-Cartier Bridge, and was scheduled to be completed for 1983. "Debate on land use in [the] Byward Market", and traffic issues, especially in Lowertown west were also issues, as was the construction of the Rideau Centre which threatened to divert traffic into the Byward Market.

Laviolette opposed urban renewal in Lowertown west, having seen its effects in Lowertown East, and supported efforts to preserve Lowertown, and preventing more traffic into the neighbourhood. He supported development of Rideau Street and the Byward Market, and the proposed Rideau Centre project, as long as it didn't add traffic to the streets around it. He opposed the "intrusion of arterial roads in residential communities", but couldn't see how he could stop the construction of the Vanier arterial through New Edinburgh, though he supported an environmental study to determine the impact it would have on the community.

Grant supported helping the city attract more industry, and prioritized maintaining the stability of established communities. He also generally opposed the Vanier arterial, and opposed plans to create arterial roads out of local streets. He supported the construction of the Rideau Centre in an effort to "bring more people downtown".

Results

The results saw a fairly close race between the two candidates, with Laviolette buoyed by the ward's large Francophone population, especially in his home neighbourhood of Lowertown. Grant won most of the polls in the rest of the ward, including his home neighbourhood of New Edinburgh.

Candidate	Votes	%
Marc Laviolette	3,590	53.69
Bruce Grant	3,096	46.31
Turnout	6,686	38.30
Eligible voters	17,456	

=== 1982 ===
In 1982, Laviolette was challenged by Pierre Labelle, 34, co-owner of a real estate firm on Dalhousie Street. Laviolette campaigned on keeping tax increases under inflation, reconstructing MacKay Street, establishing a daycare for Francophones in Lowertown, and alternate winter parking. Labelle ran on the need for a "businessman to sell our community needs and projects (on council)". He opposed infill development, and supported re-zoning large lots to reduce the number of buildings. He also opposed a plan to upgrade traffic lanes in New Edinburgh, which he believed necessitating houses being torn down. He also believed prostitution was a problem in the ward, and also supported more parking in the Byward Market.

Results

Despite being outspent, Laviolette defeated Labelle by 9 points. Labelle blamed his loss on "voter apathy and anti-business sentiment".

Candidate	Votes	%
Marc Laviolette	4,466	54.53
Pierre Labelle	3,724	45.47

=== 1985 ===
In 1985, Laviolette, who had now moved to Manor Park, was challenged by Wayne MacKinnon, 39, a social worker for the Regional Municipality of Ottawa-Carleton, a member of mayor Marion Dewar's advisory committee on visible minorities, and chairman of the police community relations committee on visible minorities.

Issues in the ward included affordable housing, and house flipping. Prostitution and the planned extension of the Vanier Parkway continued to be issues. Laviolette ran on more affordable housing, and what he called "sane density", as well as stricter measures against prostitution, plus improved services for Francophones, more senior citizens' housing and a focus on traffic, parking and development concerns in the Byward Market. MacKinnon ran on financial responsibility and accountability at city hall, affordable housing, and old-age homes, increased opportunities for visible minorities, women and the disability in municipal administration.

Results

Laviolette was easily re-elected. His campaign had been concerned that inclement weather would help MacKinnon.

Candidate	Votes	%
Marc Laviolette	4,343	72.61
Wayne MacKinnon	1,638	27.39

=== 1988 ===
Laviolette was challenged at the last minute by Richard Beaudry, 42, a political writer with The National Capital News, The Downtowner and The Entertainers, and Les McAfee, 37, a public relations consultant with (and founder) of EGALE. Both of his opponents promised to be a "full-time alderman" in contrast to Laviolette, who was still working part-time as a teacher.

Issues in the ward continued to consist of prostitution in Lowertown, as well as the presence of "vagrants". House flipping also continued to be an issue, as well as heavy truck traffic on King Edward Avenue and Dalhousie, and how much development would be allowed in the Byward Market. Laviolette indicated his priorities were "traffic and development", suggesting he supported 'proper' development. McAfee ran on a platform of more affordable housing for low and moderate income people, and protection of neighbourhoods from being overdeveloped. He also wanted to make opportunities for people on welfare to work for the city, more affordable housing, more buses, and fixing potholes.

Results

Laviolette was easily re-elected, who stated "[w]e worked hard and we blitzed. We did not take (the race) for granted".

Candidate	Votes	%
Marc Laviolette	4,395	78.11
Les MacAfee	872	15.50
Richard Beaudry	360	6.40

=== 1991 ===
Laviolette was appointed as Mayor of Ottawa in February 1991, to replace Jim Durrell, who had become the president of the Ottawa Senators. Following Laviolette's appointment, city council elected Pierre Bourque, 32, a former race car driver and vice president of a real estate development firm, to represent the ward. The election took four ballots to select Bourque, who beat community activist, typesetter and graphic artist, Maurice Pagé, on the final ballot, 7–6. Bourque's election was seen as "restoring the left-right balance" on council following Durrell's departure. The council's "pro-development" bloc supported Bourque, while the council's left wing supported Pagé. Richard Cannings, president of Heritage Ottawa, and former television journalist was eliminated on the penultimate ballot.

Bourque, Pagé, 51, and Cannings, 48 all ran for the seat in the 1991 municipal election, held in November. Richard Beaudry also ran again.

Bourque ran on opposing all tax increases, and on fiscal management. He called for the demolition of the Daly Building in the ward, and the fire-damaged block at the corner of Clarence and Dalhousie. He believed the city should focus primarily on basic services, like roads, sidewalks, parks and buss passes, as well as public safety. Cannings campaigned on his background of championing heritage issues, such as the "Save the Byward Market campaign", his efforts to protect the Daly Building and Aberdeen Pavilion from destruction, and his opposition to extending the Vanier Parkway. Pagé cited traffic on King Edward as a major issue, and opposed extending the Vanier Parkway as well. He supported building a bridge over the Ottawa River at Orleans and banning truck traffic through the ward. He also supported the redevelopment of Rideau Street. Beaudry ran on being 'a representative voice on council' for those who have experienced poverty and welfare like himself. He ran on more affordable housing, and believed public works programs should be used to get people off welfare.

Results

On election day, Cannings defeated Bourque by a "healthy margin", and claimed to be "the first ... anglophone (to win) this ward since Confederation".

Candidate	Votes	%
Richard Cannings	3,657	45.41
Pierre Bourque	2,461	30.56
Maurice Pagé	1,717	21.32
Richard Beaudry	218	2.71
