= Aggressive panhandling =

Legal term for unlawful forms of public begging

Aggressive panhandling is a legal term in some countries and jurisdictions, such as the United States, for unlawful forms of public begging. Proponents of such legislation advocate placing limits on these activities. Some opponents believe statutes prohibiting aggressive panhandling are part of the "criminalization of homelessness" and argue that such laws are discriminatory or unevenly enforced.

== Description ==
In legal and law enforcement contexts, aggressive panhandling is defined by the coercive or intimidating conduct accompanying the solicitation, rather than the request itself. Municipal ordinances generally classify behaviors such as intentionally touching the solicited person, blocking their path, following them after a refusal, or using threatening and abusive language as aggressive panhandling.

== Aggressive panhandling as a social problem ==
Helen Hershkoff claims legal restrictions on panhandlers' activities are "unconstitutionally vague, overbroad and deprive the homeless of their right to free speech".

Conversely, Roger Conner asserts that

"Aggressive begging is not common panhandling. It is uncommon panhandling, a type of harassment bordering on extortion that is practiced by a minority of street people."

== Aggressive panhandling in US law ==
The definition of aggressive panhandling is given by city and county ordinances as well as state statutes.

For example, according to the Bloomington, Indiana website, panhandling is "a growing social and public safety concern faced by cities of all sizes, including Bloomington. Many panhandlers passively ask for money or hold a sign. Others are much more aggressive, making noise, sometimes repeated demands and choose to solicit in places that are particularly intimidating such as near automated teller machines, in a restroom or near your car. This is considered aggressive panhandling and in Indiana it is against the law."

Constitutional lawyers, including but not limited to the American Civil Liberties Union, have secured a series of court decisions confirming their view that the First Amendment of the United States Constitution protects activities which some local ordinances have attempted to proscribe as illegal panhandling. In response, many jurisdictions have responded by narrowing the definition of illegal panhandling. The generally accepted terminology is to denominate such activity as aggressive panhandling.

Restrictions defining solicitation or panhandling as aggressive regard both manner and context. A typical ordinance is one from Longview, Washington:

9.23.030 Place of panhandling – Violation. It shall be unlawful for any person to panhandle when the person solicited is in any of the following places within the city limits of Longview, Washington:

1. At any bus stop; or
2. In any public transportation vehicle or facility; or
3. In any vehicle on a street or on a driveway providing ingress or egress to a street where such driveway is open to the general public; or
4. Within 50 feet of any automated teller machine (ATM); or
5. On private property, unless the panhandler is in physical possession of written permission from the owner or lawful occupant thereof. (Ord. 3051 § 2, 2008).

9.23.040 Manner of panhandling – Violation. It shall be unlawful for any person to panhandle in any of the following manners:

1. By intentionally coming within three feet of the person solicited, unless that person has indicated that he or she does wish to make a donation; or
2. By intentionally obstructing the path of the person or vehicle of the person solicited; or
3. By intentionally obstructing the passage through the entrance or exit of any building; or
4. By soliciting anyone under the age of 16; or
5. By following a person who walks away from the panhandler, if the panhandler’s conduct is intended to or is reasonably likely to intimidate the person being solicited into responding affirmatively to the solicitation; or
6. By using profane or abusive language, either during the solicitation or following a refusal. (Ord. 3051 § 2, 2008).

== Panhandling restrictions ==
=== Canada ===
The province of Ontario introduced its Safe Streets Act in 1999 to restrict specific kinds of begging, particularly certain narrowly defined cases of "aggressive" or abusive panhandling. In 2001 this law survived a court challenge under the Canadian Charter of Rights and Freedoms. The law was further upheld by the Court of Appeal for Ontario in January 2007.

=== France ===
By law n° 2003-239 of 18 March 2003, "aggressive begging" (mendicité agressive), i. e. soliciting others to hand over of money, valuables or any property on a public thoroughfare in a group in an aggressive manner, or with the threat of a dangerous animal, is punished by up to six months' imprisonment and by a fine up to €3750.

=== Norway ===
Since 2006, begging or panhandling is no longer a criminal offense in Norway. Annoying and aggressive begging may, under certain circumstances, be subject to provisions regarding refusal, removal, and expulsion as stipulated in section 7 of the Police Act, as well as various provisions in the Penal Code: disturbing the peace (§350), reckless behavior (§390a), coercion (§222), threats (§227), and fraud (§270).

=== Poland ===
Code of petty offences in Article 58 § 2. Who begs in public in a pressing or fraudulently, shall be punishable by detention or restriction of liberty.

=== South Africa ===
Begging on street corners is illegal in South Africa although not enforced.

=== United Kingdom ===
Although begging is illegal, it does not carry a jail sentence/punishment under the Vagrancy Act 1824. However, individual aggressive beggars may be subject to court injunction and jail.

=== United States ===
In 2004, the city of Orlando, Florida, passed an ordinance (Orlando Municipal Code section 43.86) requiring panhandlers to obtain a permit from the municipal police department. The ordinance further makes it a crime to panhandle in the commercial core of downtown Orlando, as well as within 50 feet of any bank or automated teller machine. It is also considered a crime in Orlando for panhandlers to make false or untrue statements, or to disguise themselves, to solicit money, and to use money obtained for a claim of a specific purpose (e.g. food or bus fare) to be spent on anything else (e.g. cigarettes or alcoholic beverages). This section was repealed in 2017.

In Baltimore, Maryland, several non-profits have been working with the "squeegee kids" to get them off the streets instead of the police having to enforce the law and have the teens arrested.
