= Rideau-Vanier Ward =

Rideau-Vanier
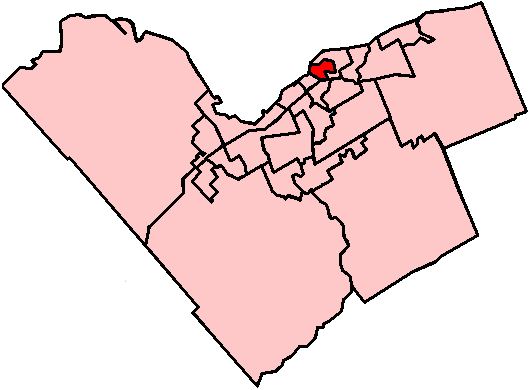
- Location within Ottawa
- Coordinates: 45°26′N 75°41′W
- Country: Canada
- Province: Ontario
- City: Ottawa

Government
  - Councillor: Stéphanie Plante

Population (2016)Canada 2016 Census
  - Total: 39,045

Languages (2016)
  - English: 53.5%
  - French: 30.2%
  - Arabic: 2.4%
  - Spanish: 2.0%
  - Mandarin: 1.3%

Rideau-Vanier Ward is a ward in the city of Ottawa, designated as Ward 12 and represented on Ottawa City Council. It was originally created in 1994 as a Ward for the Regional Council of the Regional Municipality of Ottawa-Carleton.

The ward covers the neighbourhoods of Lower Town, Sandy Hill and Vanier, and contains the University of Ottawa and the ByWard Market.

Prior to Ottawa's amalgamation in 2001, the ward covered the entire former city of Vanier as well as Ottawa's Bruyère-Strathcona Ward on regional council. Bruyère-Strathcona was created in 1994 from parts of By-Rideau Ward and St. George's Ward and was initially named Ward 5 until 1995 when it was given the Bruyère-Strathcona name.

By-St. George's Ward covered this area (not including Vanier, which was a separate city) from 1972 to 1980. By-St. George's was created from the merging of By Ward and St. George's Ward, and was abolished when it was split into St. George's Ward and By-Rideau Ward in 1980.

== Councillors ==
By-St. George's Ward (Created from By Ward and St. George's Ward)
Council	Aldermen	
1973-74	Jules Morin	
1975-76	Georges Bédard	
1977-78	Georges Bédard	
1978-80	Georges Bédard	
Ward abolished into By-Rideau Ward and St. George's Ward
Council	City Councillor (Bruyère-Strathcona Ward)	Regional Councillor (Rideau-Vanier Ward)
1994-97	Stéphane Émard-Chabot	Madeleine Meilleur
1997-00	Stéphane Émard-Chabot	Madeleine Meilleur
Rideau-Vanier Ward
Council	City Councillor	
2001-03	Madeleine Meilleur	
2003-06	Georges Bédard	
2006-10	Georges Bédard	
2010-14	Mathieu Fleury	
2014-18	Mathieu Fleury	
2018-22	Mathieu Fleury	
2022-26	Stéphanie Plante	

== Neighbourhoods ==
- ByWard Market
- Lowertown
- Sandy Hill
- Vanier

== Election results ==
=== 1972 Ottawa municipal election ===
By-St. George's Ward
Candidate	Votes	%
Jules Morin	2,383	38.15
Georges Bedard	1,479	23.68
Gerard Levesque	1,209	19.36
Bernard Wood	1,175	18.81

=== 1974 Ottawa municipal election ===
By-St. George's Ward
Candidate	Votes	%
Georges Bedard	2,456	40.05
Jules Morin	1,938	31.60
Gerard Levesque	1,292	21.07
Sam McLean	446	7.27

=== 1976 Ottawa municipal election ===
By-St. George's Ward
Candidate	Votes	%
Georges Bedard	3,785	84.51
Mauril Bélanger	694	15.49

=== 1978 Ottawa municipal election ===
By-St. George's Ward
Candidate	Votes	%
Georges Bedard	3,319	49.83
Marcel Louzon	2,687	40.35
Clotide Berube	654	654

=== 1994 elections ===
1994 Ottawa municipal election: Ward 5 (city council)
Candidate	Votes	%
Stéphane Émard-Chabot	2754	49.01
Pierre Bourque	1549	27.57
Eliseo Temprano	1149	20.45
Joseph Costisella	167	2.97

1994 Ottawa-Carleton Regional Municipality elections: Ward 12 (regional council)
Candidate	Votes	%
Madeleine Meilleur	7,702	78.94
Laurie Gourlay	2,055	21.06

=== 1997 elections ===
1997 Ottawa municipal election: Bruyère-Strathcona Ward (city council)
Candidate	Votes	%
Stéphane Émard-Chabot	3218	82.64
Allan Brian Shields	371	9.53
Steven Merritt	305	7.83

1997 Ottawa-Carleton Regional Municipality elections: Rideau-Vanier Ward (regional council)
Candidate	Votes	%
Madeleine Meilleur	5228	71.06
Alain Miguelez	1823	24.78
Jude Antonin	306	4.16

=== 2000 Ottawa municipal election ===
Candidate	Votes	%
Madeleine Meilleur	Acclaimed	

=== 2003 Ottawa municipal election ===
Candidate	Votes	%
Georges Bédard	3,631	41.52
Bruce McConville	2,355	26.93
Angela Rickman	1,829	20.91
Giacomo Vigna	582	6.66
Abdillahi Omar Bouh	211	2.41
Natasha Duckworth	137	2.41

=== 2006 Ottawa municipal election ===
Candidate	Votes	%
Georges Bédard	5685	46.72
Bruce McConville	5482	45.06
Krista Driscoll	1000	8.22

=== 2010 Ottawa municipal election ===
Candidate	Votes	%
Mathieu Fleury	4708	45.69
Georges Bédard	4620	44.84
Andrew Nellis	462	4.48
Sriyan Pinnawala	299	2.90
Marc Imbeault	215	2.09

=== 2014 Ottawa municipal election ===
City council
Candidate	Vote	%
Mathieu Fleury	5,526	51.54
Marc Aubin	3,571	33.31
Catherine Fortin LeFaivre	1,362	12.70
David-George Oldham	102	0.95
George Atanga	81	0.76
Marc Vinette	79	0.74

Ottawa mayor (Ward results)
Candidate	Vote	%
Jim Watson	8,136	80.63
Mike Maguire	1,041	10.32
Rebecca Pyrah	246	2.44
Michael St. Arnaud	211	2.09
Anwar Syed	162	1.61
Darren W. Wood	105	1.04
Bernard Couchman	100	0.99
Robert White	89	0.88

=== 2018 Ottawa municipal election ===
City council
Candidate	Vote	%
Mathieu Fleury	7,302	68.08
Thierry Harris	3,050	28.44
Matt Lowe	285	2.66
Salar Changiz	88	0.82

=== 2022 Ottawa municipal election ===
City council
Candidate	Vote	%
Stéphanie Plante	4,621	37.15
Laura Shantz	4,298	34.55
Julie Fiala	704	5.66
Alex Osorio	671	5.39
Jwane Izzetpanah	564	4.53
Tyler Cybulski	514	4.13
Patrick Auguste	330	2.65
Kim Leclerc	296	2.38
Burthomley Douzable	266	2.14
Hicham Boutaleb	176	1.41

=== 2026 Ottawa municipal election ===
2026 Ottawa municipal election: Rideau-Vanier
Candidate	Popular vote			Expenditures
Candidate	Votes	%	±%	Expenditures
Stéphanie Plante (X)	6,194	53.75		
Lyra Evans	3,791	32.90		
Julie Fiala Chartrand	565	4.90		
Brian Paquette	449	3.90		
Michael Karl Sewanaku	309	2.68		
Eric Smith	216	1.87		
Total valid votes	11,920			
Total rejected, unmarked and declined votes				
Turnout		28.57		
Eligible voters	41,716			
Note: Candidate campaign colours are based on the prominent colour used in campaign items (signs, literature, etc.) and are used as a visual differentiation between candidates.
