= Safe Streets Act =

Ontario law

The Safe Streets Act, 1999 (French: Loi de 1999 sur la sécurité dans les rues; SSA) is a statute in the province of Ontario, Canada. The act prohibits aggressive solicitation of persons in certain public places. It also prohibits the disposal of "certain dangerous things" such as used condoms, hypodermic needles and broken glass in outdoor public places. It also amends the Highway Traffic Act to regulate certain activities on roadways. The act was enacted by the Progressive Conservative government of Mike Harris and received royal assent on December 14, 1999.

The act was created in response to what was seen as the growing problem of squeegee kids on the streets. By 1999, it was very common to see squeegee kids on some of the busiest intersections where they would solicit motorists for spare change.

The act was initially affirmed by the Ontario Court of Appeal on a constitutional challenge after the Ontario Superior Court also upheld its validity in 2005. The Supreme Court of Canada denied an application for review in 2007.

In 2004, the province of British Columbia passed its own version of the Safe Streets Act, substantially a word-for-word copy of the Ontario version.

== Criticism ==
The act has been criticized by many anti-poverty groups such as OCAP (Ontario Coalition Against Poverty) for being too strict and too vague in how it defines aggressive panhandling. The bill states that "aggressive manner" means "a manner that is likely to cause a reasonable person to be concerned for his or her safety or security." This could mean almost anything as different people have different standards for when their own safety has been compromised. The act has also been criticized by The Homeless Hub, which argues that it is bad policy and practice for reasons including that issuing tickets to homeless people is a counter-productive way of dealing with a poverty issue, as homeless persons cannot pay SSA fines, and that the Safe Streets Act is not cost-effective.

The act was protested by a group of one hundred homeless in May 2006 in Ottawa who mostly identified themselves as anarchists. The march and protest was organized by the Ottawa Panhandlers' Union, a local branch of the Ottawa-Outaouais Industrial Workers of the World.

== See also ==
- Residential Tenancies Act (Ontario)
