= Jacques Legendre (Canadian politician) =

Canadian politician

Jacques Legendre is a former Ottawa City Councillor and Ottawa-Carleton Regional Councillor. He represented the Rideau-Rockcliffe Ward on regional council from 1994 until amalgamation in 2001 and continued to serve the ward on city council until 2011. He also represented Overbrook-Forbes Ward on city council from 1991 to 1994. Legendre moved to Ottawa as a teenager in 1955 he attended the University of Ottawa before leaving for McGill University in Montreal where he obtained a PhD in physics. He returned to the capital to work for the National Research Council.

A well known volunteer and activist Legendre was elected to Ottawa city council in 1991, defeating longtime city councillor George Kelly in surprise upset. The main issue in the election was the creation of a new baseball stadium in the ward. Kelly had pushed through the project, but Legendre complained that residents were not consulted and that the stadium would cause traffic and noise problems for the area. Once elected, however, Legendre failed to get the city out of the contract with the stadium developer. He was more successful in his campaign to fund a new community centre - the St Laurent Complex - and to have the St Laurent branch of the Ottawa Public Library be relocated to become part of the new community centre. As a member of the Ottawa Public Library Board he persuaded the Board to purchase a new vehicle for its "Bookmobile" service rather than scrap the service which was then provided by an aging vehicle.

In 1994 he ran for a position on the council of the Regional Municipality of Ottawa-Carleton. He was again challenged by Kelly, and also by the unsuccessful provincial NDP candidate Joan Gullen and local activist Julie Taub. On Regional Council he became a prominent member of the Police Services Board frequently challenging the chief of police.

With the creation of the new city of Ottawa in 2000 Legendre faced a bitter election battle with city council member Richard Cannings. On city council he continued his role scrutinizing the police and was a major proponent of making the city officially bilingual. In the 2003 Ottawa election he easily won election against two largely unknown opponents. However after the election controversy developed as Legendre was not given a position on the Police Services Board.

In 2005, Legendre was not among the nine councillors supporting the adoption of a compromise pesticide bylaw. He preferred to keep the pressure on at the next municipal election. He was also an opponent to the city's cancelled north-south O-Train light-rail line expansion which would have been completed in 2009.

Legendre did not run for re-election in 2010.

Preceded by Richard Cannings (Rideau Ward)	City councillors from Rideau-Rockcliffe Ward; 2000-2010	Succeeded by Peter D. Clark
Preceded by George Kelly	City councillors from Overbrook-Forbes Ward; 1991-1994	Succeeded by Ward abolished. See Richard Cannings
