= Ottawa Panhandlers' Union =

Canadian union for street people

- Founded: 2003
- Location: Canada
- Affiliations: Industrial Workers of the World

The Ottawa Panhandlers' Union (French: Syndicat des clochards d'Ottawa) was a union for panhandlers, the homeless and others formed in Ottawa, Canada in early 2003. It was a shop of the Industrial Workers of the World (IWW), Ottawa-Outaouais General Membership Branch. The union fought systematic oppression faced by street people in Ottawa; this includes the homeless, panhandlers, buskers, and people with who are part of the street. Andrew Nellis was spokesperson for this union from roughly 2005 until his resignation in April 2011. The next spokesperson was Karen Crossman.

The union adopted 'Working For Change' as its official motto.

== Structure and character ==
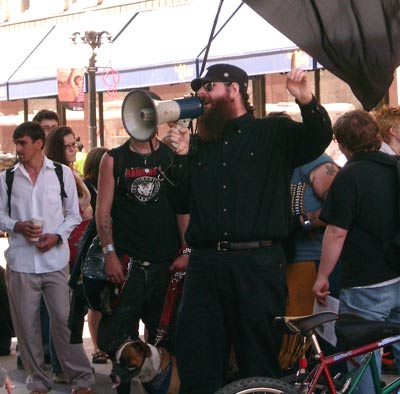
Andrew Nellis at the May 1, 2006 May Day march in Ottawa.

The organization was largely a collaborative effort by lead organizer, IWW delegate and spokesperson Karen Crossman, and other long time anti-poverty Ottawa activists.

Some of the main pieces of legislation which motivated activists to form the Panhandler's Union was the Safe Streets Act and a piece of legislation dubbed Brian's Law which was eventually found to be unconstitutional as it was used to pick up homeless people up off the street and put them in jail or mental institutions without due process. Other pieces of legislation objected to include the Vending on Highways Law, passed by Ottawa City Hall. Aside from one of its members, the panhandlers' union dues were paid for by the Industrial Workers of the World through donations and various organized events.

The Panhandlers' Union was not a conventional labour union in that its members performed their labour in non-traditional ways. This led to ridicule of the union, including an article in the Ottawa Citizen that asked if the panhandlers were fighting for "wider sidewalks?" The newspaper granted the union a chance to respond with their own op-ed piece, and their editorial, "Why Panhandlers Need a Union", was published on March 20, 2006. In May 2007, the union and its organizer Andrew Nellis were featured in a multi-page article in the Ottawa City Journal. The newspaper also interviewed panhandlers and the executive director of the Bank Street Business Improvement Area.

The union met once a month at a drop-in centre in the ByWard Market area of Ottawa. The meetings were open to anyone who interested in becoming a member. The standard IWW rules of membership were followed. Non-members could sign up on the spot to become card-carrying members of the IWW. The meetings operated under Rusty's Rules of Order and voting was based on a consensus system.

== History of union events ==
The union had meetings with panhandlers once a month. Additionally, the union held demonstrations, primarily in the summer when there is a peak in panhandling activity. Since its formation the union has also held an annual May Day event in Ottawa. The earliest action the Panhandlers' Union participated in was the Homeless Action Strike in the summer of 2004. The strike was organized by a group of poverty activists. People were encouraged to pitch a tent on City Hall property with the intent of bringing attention to the issue of homelessness. The camp was originally set up on the Laurier St. entrance to city hall but was later moved to the Elgin St. entrance at the Human Rights Monument.

On May 1, 2006, the Panhandlers' Union organized a May Day protest to shut down Rideau Street, and succeeded for more than one hour. The action targeted the Rideau Centre because of alleged incidents of violence against the homeless by mall security, two of which resulted in litigation. These alleged incidents included attacks against members of the union. Rideau Centre eventually settled the suit. The direct action also targeted the Safe Streets Act, which the Panhandlers' Union had criticized for being legislation which 'unfairly targets the poor. The action also targeted a by-law passed by Ottawa City Hall which outlawed selling newspapers on street corners. On the same day, Union members occupied the Elgin Street Police Station in Ottawa.

In 2007, a coalition of businesses, social service providers, downtown residents and police launched a campaign urging an economic boycott of panhandlers. The union's 2007 May Day event targeted the Bank Street Business Improvement Area, which the organizers felt was complicit in targeting Union members and lobbying City Hall for legislation they wished to see pass. A rally was held outside of the BIA offices, with speeches on the issue of panhandling and poverty in Ottawa. Emotions were high during the protest because of recent comments made by Mayor Larry O'Brien comparing panhandlers to pigeons. The response by the union was to egg the offices of the Bank Street BIA. Organizers of the event said this was done because it's the exact behaviour to be expected of pigeons.

== Complaint against City of Ottawa ==
The union prepared a complaint to the Canadian Human Rights Commission against the City of Ottawa in January 2009 after the latter erected a wrought iron fence to prevent union members from sleeping beneath an underpass. The fence was installed on the recommendation of the city's transportation committee in order to improve safety on the underpass, though Nellis argued that it in fact threatened the safety and security of those union members in Ottawa who relied upon its shelter in the winter.

Nellis revealed in a statement at an Ottawa City Council meeting that a settlement had been made between the city and the OPU. There is a non-disclosure agreement in place so the exact details of the agreement are unknown.

== Andrew Nellis ==
One of the original organizers of the OPU, Andrew Nellis was active with the union between 2005 and 2011. He was the spokesperson for the union for much of that time, which involved him meeting with Ottawa police and city councillors.

Nellis was arrested on April 30, 2008, the day before the annual May Day march by the IWW and Ottawa Panhandlers Union. He was allegedly caught by police trying to cut a lock on a gate in the pedestrian underpass close to the Rideau Centre. The gate had been recently put up by the City of Ottawa to prevent homeless people from sitting or sleeping under the bridge. Nellis was first held at the Elgin police station, where he was offered a deal to be released on bail with certain conditions. He refused these conditions, and was transferred to Innes Road two days later. During his time in jail, he began organizing his fellow inmates because of the poor conditions of the jail. This led to a front page article in the Ottawa Citizen about the Innes Road jail.

When Nellis appeared in court on Elgin Street on May 1, 2008 a group of concerned citizens entered the court and chanted "Andrew Nellis under attack. What do we do? Stand up, fight back!" The group was made up of OPW Union members, the homeless, Wobblies, members of People's Global Action Bloc Ottawa, and other Ottawa anarchists and activists. Nellis was released from jail 5 days later. The charges against him were later dropped by the Crown Attorney.

Nellis ran in the 2010 Ottawa municipal election for Ottawa City Council in the Rideau-Vanier Ward. Nellis finished in 3rd with 462 votes.

He is no longer spokesperson for the OPU and is pursuing a career as a tarot card reader. He has since started Street Labourers of Windsor (SLOW) which is an IWW-affiliated union including panhandlers, buskers, street people and the homeless in Windsor, Ontario.
