= Richard Cannings (Ontario politician) =

Ontario politician

Ottawa City Councillor for By-Rideau Ward
- In office 1991–2000
- Preceded by: Pierre Bourque
- Succeeded by: Jacques Legendre and Madeleine Meilleur (ward redistributed between Rideau-Rockcliffe and Rideau-Vanier)

Personal details
- Party: Liberal
- Spouse: Julie Van Dusen

Richard Cannings (born c. 1943) is a former Ottawa City Councillor, who served on council from 1991 to 2000. He represented By-Rideau Ward from 1991 to 1994 and then Rideau Ward until 2000.

Cannings, who grew up in Montreal, received a Bachelor of Arts degree from Bishop's University and a Bachelor of Education from Dalhousie University. He was a teacher in Nova Scotia and Quebec. In 1973, Cannings was the Quebec City Bureau Chief for CFCF-TV. In 1977 he later became press secretary for federal cabinet minister Hon. André Ouellette. In 1980 he became press secretary for consumer and corporate affairs.

In 1985 Cannings co-founded with Grant Hooker, the protest group- called Save the Byward Market. Its sole purpose was to stop the erection of a 17-floor hotel which would have put the Market in shade. Cannings has been credited with playing a major role in preventing major developments that would have harmed the heritage environment.

In 1986, Cannings received a degree in history of art and architecture from Carleton University. He served as president of Heritage Ottawa from 1988 to 1991.

While on council, he worked on such issues as the Vanier Parkway Extension, the Kettle Island Bridge Proposal and The Task Force On Prostitution.

On September 10, 2010, he announced his candidacy for councillor of Rideau-Rockcliffe Ward in the October 25 municipal election.
