= Squeegee man =

Occupation

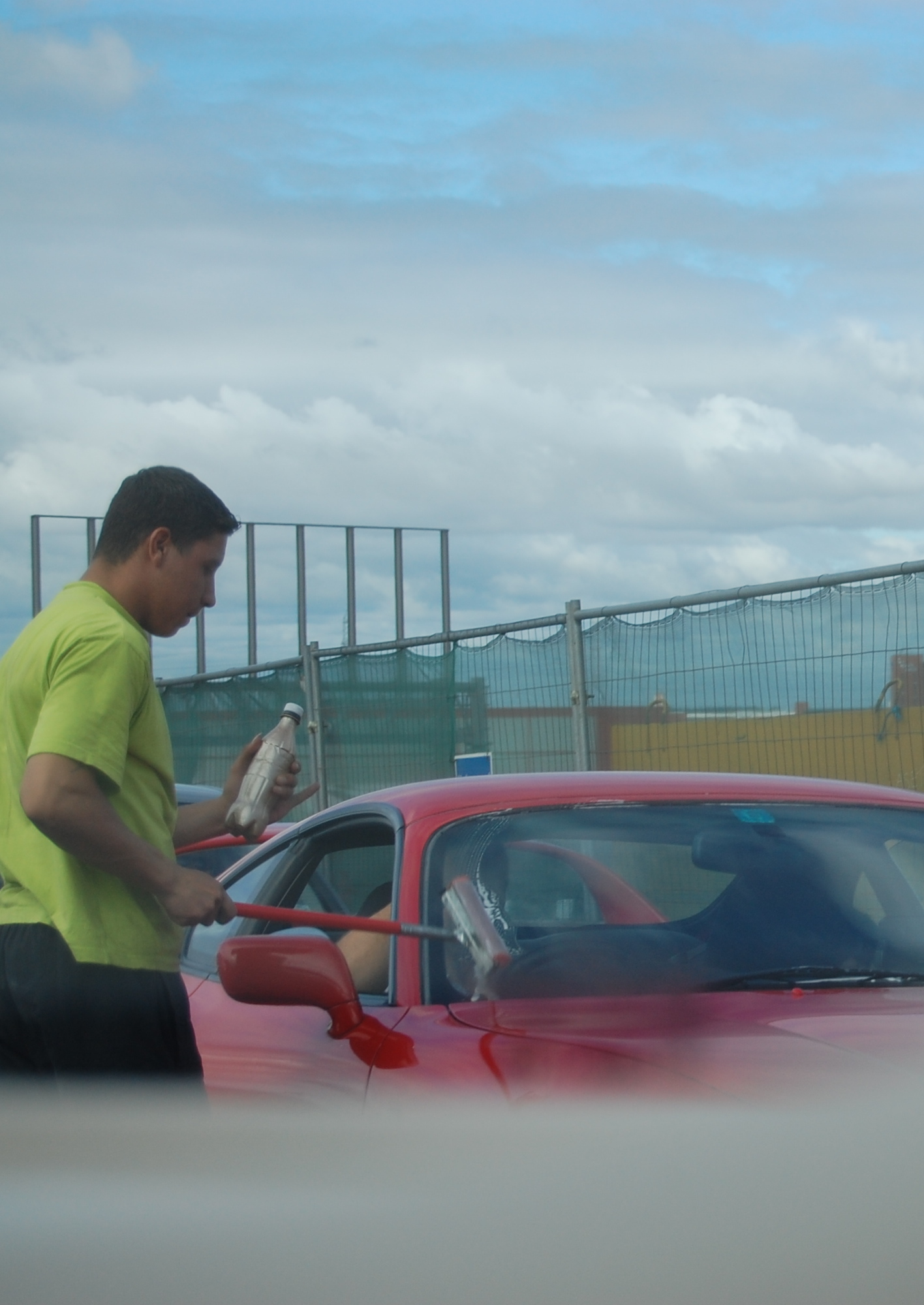
Squeegee man in Dublin, Ireland.

A squeegee man is a person who, using a washcloth, windshield washing fluid or water, and squeegee, wipes and cleans windshields of cars stopped in traffic in exchange for money. If the squeegee man starts to clean a driver's windshield without consent, this may be an example of acting as an officious intermeddler, a person who confers a benefit upon another without their consent and subsequently demands payment to which they are not legally entitled. Some jurisdictions tolerate the practice, but others view it as begging and use legal penalties to deter it.

== Terminology ==
These individuals may also be called squeegee woman, squeegee kid (Canada), squeegee boy (Baltimore), squeegee punk (Montreal), squeegee merchant (London), squeegee guy or squeegee bandit.

== By country ==
=== Canada ===
In Toronto, Vancouver, Calgary, and Winnipeg, they are known as squeegee kids and they are mostly tolerated, since they are considered to be working for money, rather than begging. In Montreal, they are often called squeegee punks, in reference to their appearance, or simply squeegees. In 1999, the Ontario government passed the Safe Streets Act, outlawing squeegee kids and aggressive public begging. The Government of British Columbia has adopted a word for word version of the Ontario Safe Street Act. Squeegee kids have become scarce in Toronto, Ontario and Vancouver, BC, as police frequently stop them and check their identities for outstanding arrest warrants.

In 2011, then Deputy Mayor of Toronto Doug Holyday told the Toronto Sun that there was the will in council to step up action against panhandlers, including squeegee kids; the proposition was mocked by some media, given the previous efforts, and the suggestion that the homeless would have to pay fines.

=== New Zealand ===
In New Zealand, window washing mostly occurs in Auckland, particularly Manukau. Window washers are considered "dangerous" and "frustrating" by drivers and Manukau Police. In 2017, the activity was outlawed by the Land Transport Amendment Act. The law's effectiveness has been questioned, as five years after it was enacted, the 2157 people that had been caught window washing were generally not deterred, and only six had paid fines.

=== United Kingdom ===
Londoners, and perhaps others, extend the appellation to include those who roam in the midst of stopped traffic to not only wash windscreens, but also hawk items such as roses and newspapers. For this reason, they are sometimes called squeegee merchants.

=== United States ===
In New York City in the 1980s, the usual procedure would involve groups of squeegee men surrounding cars stopped in traffic. Although some merely provided a service, in other cases the windshield-washing would be carried out without asking, often perfunctorily, and with subsequent demands for money, sometimes with added threats of smashing the car's windshield. Upon his election, mayor Rudy Giuliani famously sought to remove squeegee men from the streets as part of his quality-of-life campaign, claiming that their near-ubiquitous presence created an environment of disorder that encouraged more serious crime to flourish. Squeegee men disappeared from city streets during Giuliani's mayoralty and did not reappear in significant numbers. In his book Leadership, Giuliani explained that his method of removing the squeegee men from the street involved arresting them. Patrolmen who first made the arrests saw that the squeegee men were released immediately, because according to the New York penal code at the time, cleaning someone's windshield was not illegal. Giuliani told the officers that if they saw any more squeegee men they should simply arrest them for jaywalking.

Squeegee men (or "squeegee boys" for younger examples) remain prevalent in Baltimore, Maryland.

== See also ==
- Crossing sweeper
- S.P.I.T.: Squeegee Punks in Traffic
