= Madeleine Meilleur =

Canadian politician (born 1948)

The Honourable Madeleine Meilleur ECO

Ontario MPP
- In office 2003–2016
- Preceded by: Claudette Boyer
- Succeeded by: Nathalie Des Rosiers
- Constituency: Ottawa—Vanier

Ottawa City Councillor
- In office 2001–2003
- Preceded by: Stéphane Émard-Chabot
- Succeeded by: Georges Bédard
- Constituency: Rideau-Vanier Ward

Vanier City Councillor
- In office 1991–1994
- Preceded by: Marc Grandmaître
- Succeeded by: Robert Crête
- Constituency: William D'Aoust Ward

Ottawa-Carleton Regional Councillor
- In office 1991–2000
- Preceded by: Guy Cousineau
- Succeeded by: Position abolished
- Constituency: Vanier (1991-1994); Rideau-Vanier Ward (1994-2000)

Personal details
- Born: November 22, 1948 (age 78) Kiamika, Quebec, Canada
- Party: Liberal
- Occupation: Registered Nurse, Lawyer

Madeleine Meilleur (born November 22, 1948) is a Canadian nurse, lawyer and former politician in Ontario, Canada. She was a Liberal member of the Legislative Assembly of Ontario from 2003 to 2016. She represented the riding of Ottawa—Vanier. She was a cabinet minister in the governments of Dalton McGuinty and Kathleen Wynne.

In May 2017, she was nominated by Prime Minister Justin Trudeau to become Canada's next Official Languages Commissioner. Her appointment had to be approved by the House of Commons and Senate to become official. On June 7, 2017, she withdrew her name from consideration due to controversy around her selection.

== Background ==
Meilleur was born in the Quebec community of Kiamika. She is both a registered nurse and a lawyer, specializing in labour and employment law and has served on the Ottawa-Carleton Regional District Health Council, the Champlain District Health Council, the Ottawa-Carleton Children's Aid Society and the Vanier Housing Corporation.

== Municipal politics ==
Meilleur was elected to the city of Vanier's municipal council in 1991, and also served as a council member in the Regional Municipality of Ottawa-Carleton (which included members from Vanier and other local municipalities). In 2000, she was acclaimed as a city councillor in the newly amalgamated city of Ottawa. During her time in municipal government, Meilleur represented the council on the French-Language Services Advisory Committee. She received the United Way's Community Builder's Award in 2001.

== Provincial politics ==
=== McGuinty government ===
In the 2003 provincial election, Meilleur was elected in the riding of Ottawa—Vanier as the Liberal Party candidate.

The Liberal party won the election, and Meilleur was appointed Minister of Culture with responsibility for Francophone Affairs on October 23, 2003. In November 2003, Meilleur announced that provincial grants would be made available to libraries in rural communities. In April 2004, she announced the extension of demolition controls on heritage buildings. In 2008, she became the province's first cabinet minister ever to attend an international summit of La Francophonie.

On April 5, 2006, Meilleur was appointed Minister of Community and Social Services. She was reelected to her Ottawa—Vanier riding in the 2007 provincial election.

After she was re-elected in the 2011 provincial election, she was appointed Minister of Community Safety and Correctional Services.

=== Wynne government ===
When Kathleen Wynne took over as Premier in 2013, Meilleur continued in her position as Minister of Community Safety and Correctional Services. She was re-elected in the 2014 provincial election. On June 24, 2014 she was appointed Attorney General of Ontario, the first francophone to hold the position.

In 2016, she was criticized over her initial refusal and subsequent delay in releasing the Special Investigations Unit's report on the police shooting of Andrew Loku.

On June 9, 2016, Meilleur announced her retirement after 25 years in politics. Her resignation from the legislature coincided with a June 2016 cabinet shuffle.

=== Cabinet positions ===
Wynne ministry, Province of Ontario (2013–2018)
Cabinet post (1)
Predecessor	Office	Successor
John Gerretsen	Attorney General; 2014–2016; Also responsible for Francophone Affairs	Yasir Naqvi
McGuinty ministry, Province of Ontario (2003–2013)
Cabinet posts (3)
Predecessor	Office	Successor
Jim Bradley	Minister of Community Safety and Correctional Services; 2013–2014; Also Responsible for Francophone Affairs	Yasir Naqvi
Sandra Pupatello	Minister of Community and Social Services; 2006–2011	John Milloy
David Tsubouchi	Minister of Culture; 2003–2006; Also Responsible for Francophone Affairs	Caroline Di Cocco

== Commissioner of Official Languages ==
Meilleur was nominated to become the Commissioner of Official Language by the federal government on May 15, 2017. Her appointment was challenged as failing to be sufficiently non-partisan due to Meilleur's links to the ruling Liberal Party of Canada. She withdrew her name from consideration on June 7, 2017. In the end, this position was filled by Raymond Théberge.

== Electoral record ==
2014 Ontario general election: Ottawa—Vanier
Party	Candidate	Votes	%	±%
Liberal	Madeleine Meilleur	21,810	55.55	+4.04
Progressive Conservative	Martin Forget	8,750	22.29	–1.16
New Democratic	Hervé Ngamby	5,228	13.32	–6.29
Green	Dave Bagler	3,144	8.01	+3.49
Libertarian	Phillip Richard	329	0.84	–
Total valid votes		39,261	98.70	
Total rejected, unmarked and declined ballots		517	1.30	+0.88
Turnout		39,778	48.86	+2.05
Eligible voters		81,412		
Liberal hold		Swing		+2.60
Source: Elections Ontario

2011 Ontario general election
Party	Candidate	Votes	%	±%
Liberal	Madeleine Meilleur	19,615	51.4	
Progressive Conservative	Fred Sherman	8,931	23.4	
New Democratic	Paul Étienne Laliberté-Tipple	7,525	19.7	
Green	Dave Bagler	1,719	4.5	
Family Coalition	Emmanuel Houle	352	0.9	
Total valid votes		38,142	100.0	

2007 Ontario general election
Party	Candidate	Votes	%	±%
Liberal	Madeleine Meilleur	20,951	50.8	-1.7
Progressive Conservative	Bruce Poulin	9,169	22.2	-4.0
New Democratic	Ric Dagenais	6,144	14.9	-0.8
Green	Leonard Poole	4,287	10.4	+5.9
Family Coalition	Frank Cioppa	400	1.0	
Independent	Robert Larter	256	0.6	
Total valid votes		38,142	100.0	

2003 Ontario general election
Party	Candidate	Votes	%	±%
Liberal	Madeleine Meilleur	22,188	53.5	+0.5
Progressive Conservative	Maurice Lamirande	10,878	26.2	-5.6
New Democratic	Joseph Zebrowski	6,507	15.7	+5.2
Green	Raphael Thierrin	1,876	4.5	+2.1
Total valid votes		41,449	100.0	
