= Marc Laviolette =

Canadian politician

54th Mayor of Ottawa
- In office 18 February 1991 – December 1991
- Preceded by: Jim Durrell
- Succeeded by: Jacquelin Holzman

Ottawa City Councillor
- In office 1980 – February 1991
- Preceded by: Georges Bédard (By-St. George's) & Rhéal Robert (Rideau)
- Succeeded by: Pierre Bourque
- Constituency: By-Rideau Ward

Marc Laviolette (born c. 1951 in Ottawa, Ontario) was Mayor of Ottawa for much of 1991. He was declared Mayor on 18 February 1991 after Jim Durrell resigned to become president of the fledgling Ottawa Senators ice hockey team. Laviolette had been an alderman for the city's By/Rideau ward since 1980.

He sought a second term as Mayor but was defeated by Jacquelin Holzman in the general city elections in late 1991. He later worked at Lower Town's École secondaire publique De La Salle as an education counsellor. He was also a teacher at De La Salle earlier in his career.
