= Jacquelin Holzman =

Canadian politician

55th Mayor of Ottawa
- In office 1991–1997
- Preceded by: Marc Laviolette
- Succeeded by: Jim Watson

Ottawa City Councillor
- In office 1982–1991
- Preceded by: Donald Bartlett Reid
- Succeeded by: Alex Cullen
- Constituency: Richmond Ward

Personal details
- Born: Jacquelin Feldman; 1935 Ottawa
- Party: Conservative
- Spouse(s): John Stephen Holzman (1954-1979; divorced); John Rutherford (m. 1987)

Jacquelin Holzman (born 1935) is a Canadian politician who served as the 55th mayor of Ottawa, Ontario, Canada, from 1991 to 1997. Before that, she was an Ottawa city councillor from 1982 to 1991.

== Early life and advocacy ==
Holzman was born in Ottawa, Ontario to parents Sally Feldman and Israel Feldman. She has one sister, Evelyn Greenberg.

Holzman was an advocate for multiple causes before she became a politician. In the 1950s, Holzman joined the National Council of Jewish Women. She also became an advocate for people with disabilities, focusing her efforts on affordable housing and employment opportunities for people with disabilities. In this capacity Holzman was involved in founding Ottawa's Tamir Foundation as well as the Salus Corporation for supportive and rehabilitative housing.

== City council ==
Backed by "several prominent Conservatives", Holzman was elected to Ottawa city council in 1982 representing the Richmond Ward (now Bay Ward), defeating future mayor Bob Chiarelli. Shortly after her re-election to a second term, Ottawa Citizen citizen staff writer Jacquie Miller described Holzman as "probably the most fiscally conservative councillor" during her first term, and contrasted her with councillors who were less sympathetic to large building development projects.

Acclaimed in the 1985 election, she soon ran into controversy in her second term over an expansion to the Carlingwood Shopping Centre. Holzman supported the expansion but many of her constituents were opposed. In the 1988 Ottawa municipal election, she faced a strong challenge from Alex Cullen, but was re-elected with more than 50% of the vote.

== Mayor of Ottawa ==
Throughout her time in city council, Holzman was a close ally of mayor Jim Durrell. When Durrell did not run for re-election, Holzman ran against left-leaning councillor Nancy Smith. Holzman ran on a pro-development and tax cut platform and defeated Smith and interim mayor Marc Laviolette. Holzman was the first Jewish woman to be mayor of Ottawa.

During Holzman's first term, she advocated in favour of the Charlottetown Accords, and worked to increase Ottawa's international status. In 1993 she represented Ottawa in Kyoto at the Third Capitals of the World Conference, and in the same month she led a trade mission to Taiwan to promote Taiwanese investment and tourism in Ottawa. She also supported Taiwan establishing a diplomatic office in Ottawa. Despite Holzman's reputation for fiscal conservatism, future Ottawa Mayor Jim Watson (then a newly elected city councillor) was described in The Canadian Encyclopedia as "a thorn in the side of then mayor Jacquelin Holzman over several expenditures he wouldn't support" because of his own reluctance to approve expenses.

In the 1994 mayoral election she faced a number of challengers. One major debate during her second term regarded the mayor's desire to build the unity tower which had been approved for the then-new Ottawa City Hall. In November 1996 she announced that she would not run for re-election. She was expected to face a difficult election against city councillor Jim Watson, who succeeded her as mayor.

== Post-mayoral work ==
The same year that she retired from political life, Holzman became the chair of the Ottawa Congress Centre, a position which she held for several years.

In 1998, Holzman was awarded an honorary doctorate from the University of Ottawa. She also received a diagnosis in 1998 of breast cancer. Even though she was no longer mayor, Holzman held a press conference and shared the diagnosis with the public to encourage people to seek out mammograms, which made prominent news in outlets like the Ottawa Citizen. She subsequently became an advocate for causes related to breast cancer.

In 2002 Holzman became chair of the Ottawa Hospital Research Institute. In 2007, she was appointed to the board of the National Capital Commission. Holzman is also a co-founder of the group Compassionate Ottawa, which advocates for palliative care and end-of-life options in Ottawa.

A proposal in February 2020 sought to name the pedestrian bridge crossing Highway 417 at Harmer Street in Ottawa's Kitchissippi Ward the "Jackie Holzman Bridge". The motion passed, and the bridge opened in September 2020.

== Honours ==
- Honorary Doctorate, University of Ottawa (1998)
- Lifetime Achievement Award Recipient, Volunteer Ottawa (2020)
